= 2020–2022 Malaysian political crisis =

Political crisis in Malaysia

- Date: 22 February 2020 – 24 November 2022
- Location: Malaysia
- Also known as: Sheraton Move (Malay: Langkah Sheraton)
- Cause: Political infighting and party switching within Pakatan Harapan and Perikatan Nasional leading to inability to form a stable majority government in the Dewan Rakyat; Prime Minister Mahathir Mohamad's refusal to set a date for the transition of power to his designated successor, Anwar Ibrahim; Intention to establish an ethnic Malay-centric coalition government; Political impact of the COVID-19 pandemic (from March 2020) and 2021 state of emergency
- Participants: Members of the Dewan Rakyat, 14th Malaysian Parliament; Yang di-Pertuan Agong Al-Sultan Abdullah Ri'ayatuddin Al-Mustafa Billah Shah
- Outcome: Formation of Anwar Ibrahim cabinet, after collapse of 2 successive governments and a snap general election: Resignation of Prime Minister Mahathir Mohamad; Collapse of Pakatan Harapan coalition government as Parti Pribumi Bersatu Malaysia and some members of Parti Keadilan Rakyat withdraw; Appointment of Muhyiddin Yassin as the 8th Prime Minister; Perikatan Nasional replaces Pakatan Harapan as the coalition government; Resignation of Perikatan Nasional Cabinet and Prime Minister Muhyiddin Yassin; Appointment of Ismail Sabri Yaakob as the 9th Prime Minister; Amendment to the Constitution of Malaysia to restrict party switching; Calling of 2022 snap election; Hung parliament for the first time in Malaysian history; Appointment of Anwar Ibrahim as the 10th Prime Minister

The 2020–2022 Malaysian political crisis was triggered after several Members of Parliament (MPs) of the 14th Malaysian Parliament changed party support, leading to the loss of a parliamentary majority, the collapse of two successive coalition governments and the resignation of two Prime Ministers. The political crisis culminated in a 2022 snap general election and the eventual formation of a coalition government. The crisis ended in 2022 at the federal level but continued until 2023 in the state of Sabah in what became known as the Kinabalu Move.

In February 2020, a development commonly referred to as the Sheraton Move, saw the fall of the ruling Pakatan Harapan (PH) coalition government and the resignation of Prime Minister Mahathir Mohamad after 22 months in office. They were replaced by the Perikatan Nasional (PN) coalition government, led by Prime Minister Muhyiddin Yassin. Political instability persisted after these changes throughout 2020 and into 2021, exacerbated by the COVID-19 pandemic. This culminated in the resignation of Muhyiddin and his cabinet in August 2021, after 17 months in power. A few days later, Ismail Sabri Yaakob was appointed as the ninth prime minister to replace Muhyiddin. The crisis triggered several early state elections and a 2022 snap general election.

The crisis began with divisions within the ruling Pakatan Harapan coalition. Some sources indicate that this developed in part due to Prime Minister Mahathir Mohamad's efforts to manage the transition of power to his designated successor, Anwar Ibrahim, as had been agreed upon before the 2018 general election. Several MPs began discussions about forming a new government by claiming majority support in the Dewan Rakyat, the lower chamber of the bicameral Parliament of Malaysia, without a general election.

This was achieved through the withdrawal of the Parti Pribumi BERSATU Malaysia (BERSATU) from the Pakatan Harapan coalition and the support of several MPs from the Parti Keadilan Rakyat (PKR), led by its deputy president Azmin Ali, who left the party. Prime Minister Mahathir then resigned, creating a power vacuum.

Malaysia's monarch, the Yang di-Pertuan Agong Abdullah of Pahang, met with all MPs and political party leaders to assess their support for a new prime minister. He ultimately appointed the president of BERSATU, Muhyiddin Yassin, as the eighth prime minister. Muhyiddin then declared his coalition government as Perikatan Nasional.

Four states — Johor, Malacca, Perak and Kedah — also experienced changes in their respective state governments as Perikatan Nasional gained majorities in the separate state legislative assemblies. The Sabah State Legislative Assembly was dissolved, triggering the 2020 Sabah state election. Perikatan Nasional won the election and formed the state government with Barisan Nasional and United Sabah Party under the Gabungan Rakyat Sabah (GRS) coalition.

Political instability continued after the government change. Opposition leader Anwar Ibrahim announced in September 2020 that he had obtained majority support to form a new government, though this did not materialise. Malaysia declared a State of Emergency in January 2021 amid the worsening COVID-19 pandemic, which contributed to further instability within the Perikatan Nasional coalition in mid-2021. After a lengthy suspension, parliament temporarily reconvened but debates over the emergency measures were blocked and the session was suspended again when COVID-19 cases were detected in the building. Opposition MPs attempted to enter parliament on 2 August 2021 after the State of Emergency was lifted, but were prevented from doing so by police. After losing majority support and unsuccessful attempts to regain it, Prime Minister Muhyiddin and his cabinet resigned on 16 August 2021.

Four days later, UMNO's Vice President Ismail Sabri Yaakob was appointed prime minister by the Yang di-Pertuan Agong after receiving support from the most MPs. Ismail Sabri's government signed a Memorandum of Understanding (MOU) with Pakatan Harapan in an attempt to ensure greater political stability. In 2021 and 2022, instability in state legislative assemblies triggered further elections in Malacca and Johor. The crisis culminated in an early general election in 2022, which resulted in a hung parliament; Anwar Ibrahim was subsequently appointed as prime minister to lead a coalition government.

== Background and key people ==
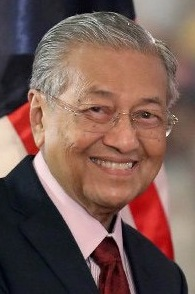
Mahathir Mohamad, the 4th and 7th Prime Minister

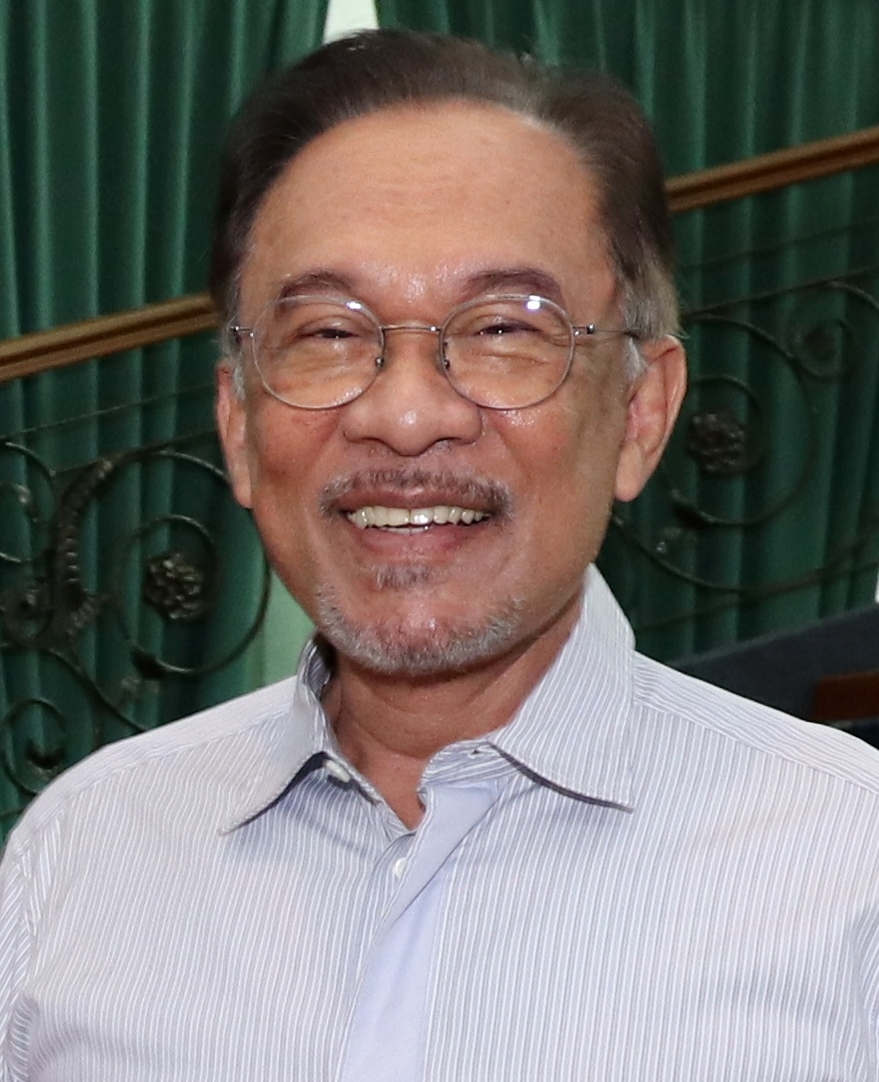
Anwar Ibrahim, the president of PKR and the 10th Prime Minister

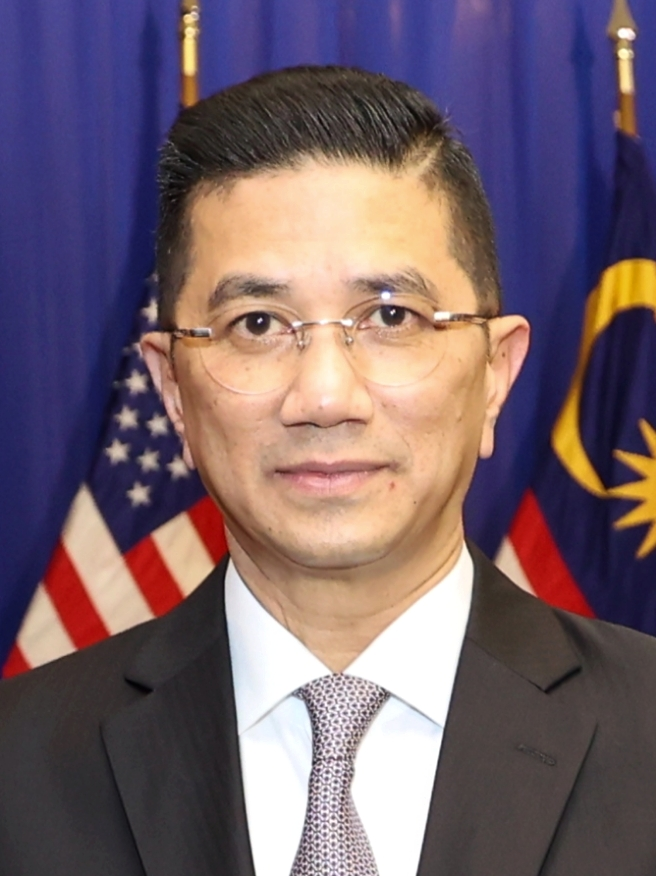
Azmin Ali, former deputy president of PKR

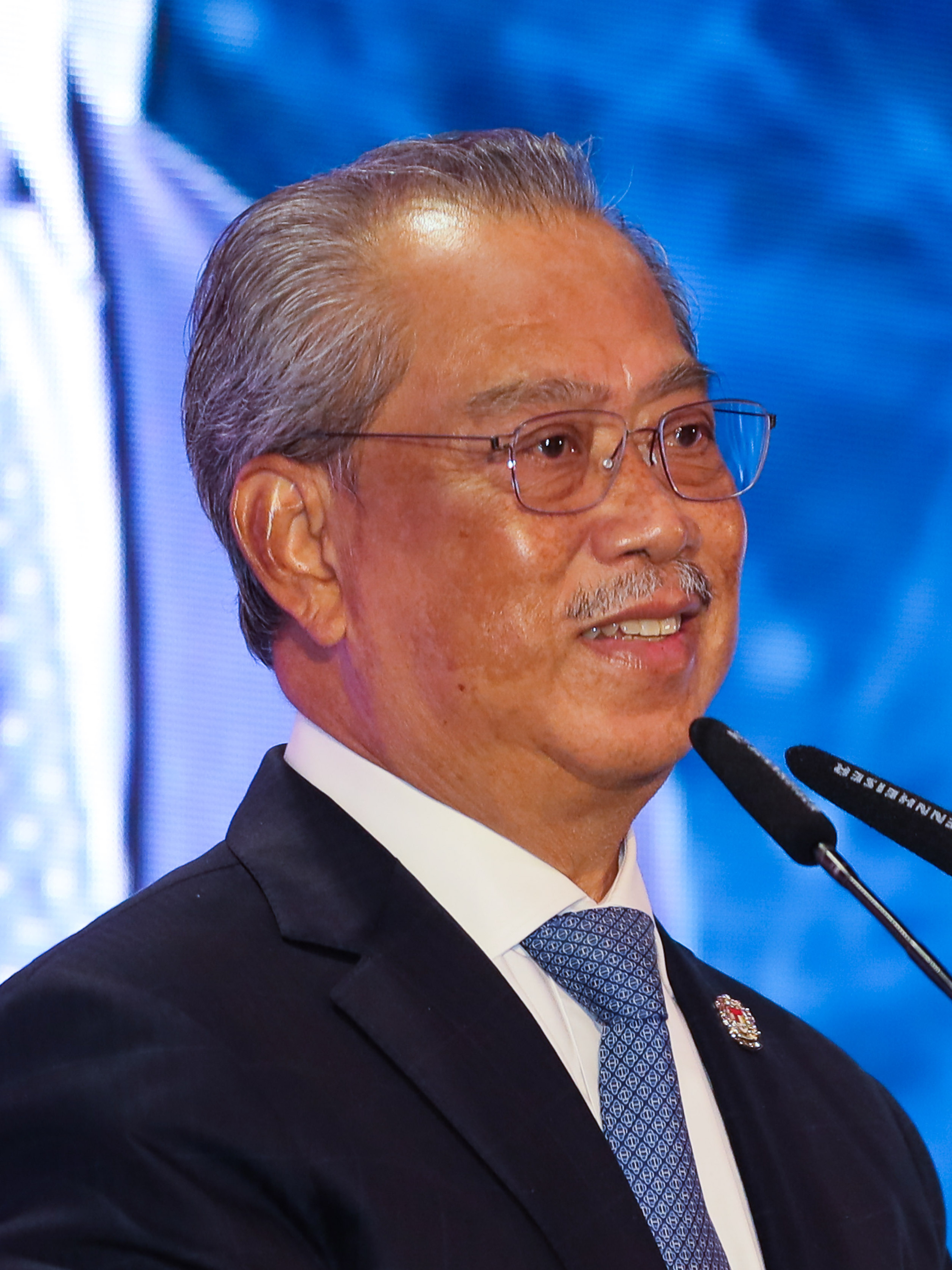
Muhyiddin Yassin, the 8th Prime Minister

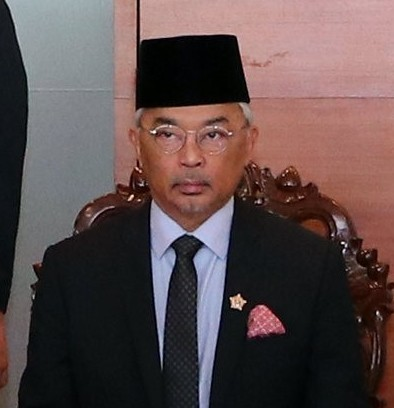
Sultan Abdullah, 16th King of Malaysia

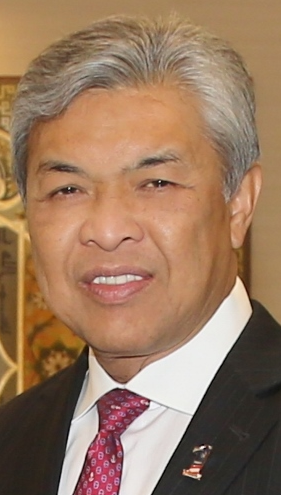
Ahmad Zahid Hamidi, the President of UMNO

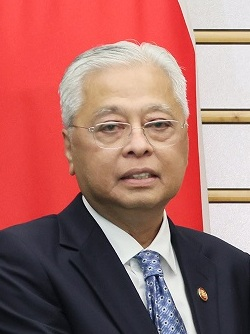
Ismail Sabri Yaakob, the 9th Prime Minister

Pakatan Harapan (PH) is a coalition of four political parties: Parti Keadilan Rakyat (PKR), Parti Pribumi BERSATU Malaysia (BERSATU), Parti Amanah Negara (AMANAH) and Democratic Action Party (DAP). It was established in 2015 and won the 2018 general election, defeating the ruling Barisan Nasional (BN) coalition government. BN had been in power at the federal level for almost 60 years, marking the first transfer of power to a different political coalition since Malaysia gained independence. Mahathir Mohamad, then chairman of BERSATU and leader of Pakatan Harapan, was elected as the seventh Prime Minister of Malaysia, making him the world's oldest prime minister at age 92. Mahathir had previously served as Malaysia's fourth prime minister from 1981 to 2003 under the United Malays National Organisation (UMNO), a component party of BN. He left UMNO in 2016 and founded BERSATU to oppose the sixth prime minister, Najib Razak, following the 1MDB scandal.

In the 2018 election, Mahathir reconciled with his former political rival Anwar Ibrahim, leader of PKR. Anwar had served as Mahathir's deputy prime minister from 1993 to 1998 before he was dismissed and imprisoned under corruption charges. Anwar was later imprisoned again in 2014 under sodomy charges but was granted a royal pardon in 2018 by the 15th Yang di-Pertuan Agong, Muhammad V of Kelantan. Mahathir had promised to transfer the position of prime minister to Anwar after two years, but the handover did not occur as initially planned.

Azmin Ali, the deputy president of PKR, had previously served as Anwar's private secretary from 1993 to 1998. He joined PKR after leaving Mahathir's UMNO in the late 1990s. Azmin was appointed by the Sultan of Selangor, Sharafuddin of Selangor, as Menteri Besar of Selangor, following a political manoeuvre known as the Kajang Move in 2014. After the 2018 general election, he joined Mahathir's cabinet as the Minister of Economic Affairs. Tensions arose between Azmin and Anwar, which came to the fore during PKR's national congress in December 2019, where remarks about "treachery" were made, which were perceived by some as being aimed at Azmin.

Muhyiddin Yassin is the president and a founding member of BERSATU. He was previously the deputy president of UMNO and served as the deputy prime minister from 2009 until 2015 under Najib Razak. He was dismissed from his position after criticising Najib over the 1MDB scandal and was later expelled from UMNO in 2016. After the 2018 election, Muhyiddin was appointed as the Minister of Home Affairs.

Ismail Sabri Yaakob is a senior politician in UMNO and a member of the BN coalition. After BN's loss in the 2018 general election, he served as Leader of the Opposition.

Ahmad Zahid Hamidi is the president of UMNO, having assumed the position in 2018. He served as the Deputy Prime Minister from 2015 to 2018 under Najib Razak, following the expulsion of Muhyiddin from UMNO.

The Yang di-Pertuan Agong, Malaysia's constitutional monarch, holds the prerogative to appoint the prime minister based on parliamentary support, under Article 43 of the Malaysian Constitution. The position of Yang di-Pertuan Agong rotates every five years among the nine Malay rulers. The then Yang di-Pertuan Agong was Abdullah of Pahang, who ascended the throne in 2019.

=== COVID-19 pandemic ===
The global COVID-19 pandemic spread to Malaysia in late January 2020. The first major local outbreak occurred at a Tablighi Jamaat religious event in Kuala Lumpur in late February 2020. As the pandemic emerged as a global crisis by March 2020, including in Malaysia, it has had major economic, social and political impacts.

== 2020 ==
=== February: Sheraton Move, fall of Pakatan Harapan government ===
==== 21-22 February ====
The presidential council of Pakatan Harapan held a late-night meeting to discuss the leadership transition from Prime Minister Mahathir Mohamad to Anwar Ibrahim, who had been referred to as the "Prime Minister-in-waiting" following Pakatan Harapan's 2018 election victory. During the meeting, Anwar reportedly agreed to allow Mahathir to determine the timing of his resignation, with a potential transition after the APEC Malaysia 2020 summit scheduled for November. Multiple sources indicated that the meeting included discussions that were described as tense, particularly surrounding the timeline of Mahathir's departure.

In May, an audio recording of the meeting was leaked, in which BERSATU Youth chief Syed Saddiq Syed Abdul Rahman and PKR deputy president Azmin Ali reportedly expressed concerns that Mahathir might be perceived as a "lame-duck prime minister" if a fixed timeline was established. Some members of PKR expressed support for Anwar to assume the role of prime minister within the originally discussed timeframe of two years following the coalition's electoral win on 9 May 2018.

According to a Reuters report, Mahathir had considered forming a unity government involving various political parties, including accepting former members of UMNO into BERSATU and engaging with opposition parties such as PAS. This move was interpreted by some as an effort to expand political support and provide flexibility regarding the leadership transition. Reports suggest that the growing calls for a definitive timeline led to accelerated political developments, culminating in key events on 23 February.

==== 23 February ====
On 23 February 2020, several political parties held extraordinary meetings: BERSATU at its headquarters at Menara Yayasan Selangor in Petaling Jaya, Muafakat Nasional pact of UMNO and Parti Islam Se-Malaysia (PAS) had a retreat in Janda Baik, Pahang, UMNO's supreme council at Putra World Trade Centre (PWTC), and Gabungan Parti Sarawak (GPS)'s members of the parliament (MPs) in Kuala Lumpur.

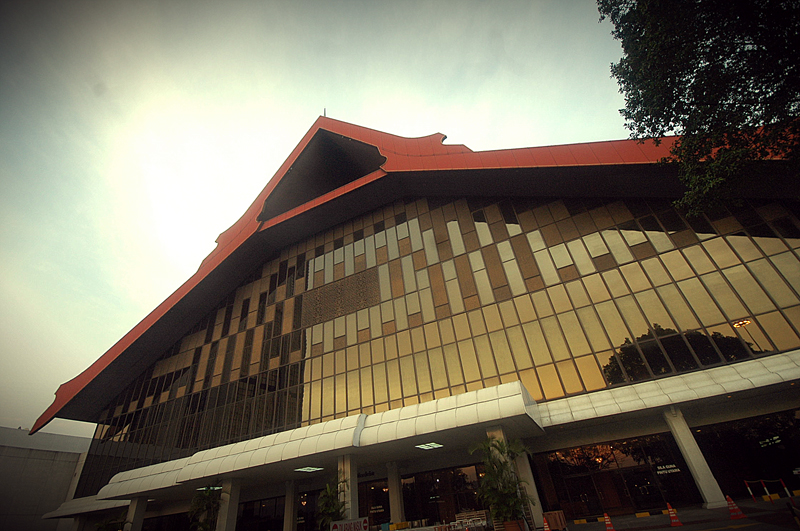
The Putra World Trade Center building where UMNO's supreme council had held their meeting.

Azmin Ali, the deputy president of PKR and the Minister of Economic Affairs, also held a meeting with several lawmakers from the party and twenty others at Sheraton Hotel in Petaling Jaya, amidst rumours that the formation of a new governing coalition was being undertaken. The event was widely reported on local media as Langkah Sheraton or the Sheraton Move.

Azmin and his faction in PKR went to the Istana Negara in the evening to seek an audience with the Yang di-Pertuan Agong. Leaders from five other political parties; BERSATU's Muhyiddin Yassin, also the Minister of Home Affairs, UMNO's Ahmad Zahid Hamidi, PAS's Hadi Awang, GPS's Abang Johari Openg and Parti Warisan Sabah (Warisan)'s Shafie Apdal were also in attendance. It was speculated that the leaders were there to brief the Agong about the recent political development; the formation of a new coalition government and to declare their support for a new prime minister, effectively blocking PKR's president Anwar Ibrahim from the position. After the meeting, several opposition party leaders, including UMNO's Ismail Sabri Yaakob and PAS's Hadi Awang, joined Azmin's supporters at Sheraton Hotel.

In a Facebook Live broadcast of a night prayer session at Anwar's residence, Anwar said that someone had informed him that a "treachery" was committed involving "former friends from BERSATU and a small group from PKR". Later, Azmin, in a statement, claimed that his action was to protect Mahathir, who was forced to choose a date for the transition of power during Pakatan Harapan presidential meeting on 21 February. The statutory declaration (SD) presented to the Agong was to cement support for Mahathir, not to elect a new prime minister. He further said that the real traitor was the faction that tried to usurp Mahathir.

==== 24 February ====
In the morning of 24 February 2020, Anwar Ibrahim; the deputy prime minister, Wan Azizah Ismail, also Anwar's wife; the president of Amanah, Mat Sabu; and the secretary general of DAP, Lim Guan Eng, met Mahathir at his residence to seek clarification regarding the incident. Anwar later stated that he was satisfied with the meeting outcome, as Mahathir had clarified that he had nothing to do with the pact to make a new coalition government.

PKR held a press conference at 2 pm where its general secretary, Saifuddin Nasution Ismail, announced that Azmin and the Minister of Housing and Local Government, Zuraida Kamaruddin, also the vice president of PKR, had been dismissed by the party. Saifuddin explained that they were expelled due to their actions on 23 February which was against the party's principle regarding the position of prime minister. Azmin later announced that he would be forming an independent bloc at the parliament along with Zuraida and other nine MPs. They had decided to exit the party following his expulsion.

In the afternoon of 24 February, the prime minister's office confirmed that Mahathir had submitted his resignation to the Agong. Half an hour later, he also announced his resignation from his position as chairman of BERSATU after Muhyiddin declared the party's withdrawal from Pakatan Harapan coalition. The Agong tried to convince Mahathir against resigning, but the latter insisted. The Agong then accepted his resignation and appointed him as the interim prime minister until a new prime minister is chosen. The Cabinet of Malaysia was dissolved, per Article 43(5) of the Constitution of Malaysia. Pakatan Harapan lost its majority in the parliament after BERSATU and Azmin Ali-led faction of eleven MPs withdrew from the coalition at 2 pm. A representative of the palace then announced that the Agong would interview all 221 MPs, excluding Mahathir, to weigh their support for prime minister candidates. The interview sessions were held on 25 and 26 February, with 90 MPs on the former and 131 MPs on the latter.

At 9 pm, BERSATU leaders held an emergency meeting at its headquarters to discuss the party's future direction. Members of BERSATU rejected Mahathir's resignation as the party's chairman and pledged their support for him to be the prime minister. The party's secretary-general Marzuki Yahya said that the BERSATU's supreme council members were unanimous in their support for Mahathir.

==== 25 February ====
On 25 February, Agong summoned 90 MPs to have an audience with the Yang di-Pertuan Agong. Starting from 2:30 pm, the Agong spent two to three minutes interviewing each MPs. Following the first round of interviews, UMNO and PAS revealed that they have withdrawn their earlier support for Mahathir to remain as prime minister, and had instead called for parliament dissolution. It was previously reported that as all political factions voiced their support for Mahathir, he was about to establish a "unity government" that the two parties did not agree with. Annuar Musa, UMNO's secretary-general, said the basis of negotiations with Mahathir was that UMNO and PAS would lend their support to form an alternative coalition without DAP. Therefore, both PAS and UMNO declared their support for a snap election instead. Takiyuddin Hassan confirmed the would-be coalition would have been called Perikatan Nasional.

An emergency Pakatan Harapan presidential council meeting was held at PKR's headquarters in Petaling Jaya at night. Pakatan Harapan parties; DAP, PKR and Amanah invited Mahathir to the meeting in order to restore the previous government but Mahathir did not attend the joint meeting.

Later on 3 February 2021, Mahathir claimed that when the Pakatan Harapan MPs made their statutory declaration in front of the Agong, they did not name him as their candidate. Anwar had convinced PH MPs that he had sufficient support from Sabah and Sarawak MPs and PH MPs to have a majority to become prime minister. Mahathir said that "only DAP, Amanah, and his faction of his PKR" supported Anwar. Anwar had 92 supporters while Mahathir had 62. "When Muhyiddin was named Prime Minister he did not have majority support. But upon his appointment he was able to offer places in his cabinet to the members who supported me. They crossed over and Muhyiddin achieved a majority of two", Mahathir wrote on his blog.

==== 26 February ====
Interim Prime Minister Mahathir addressed the nation at 4.45 pm on the political situation. He began his speech by apologising to Malaysians for the current impasse before confirming speculation that he wanted to form a unity government, saying the new administration would focus on national interests instead of political parties. Mahathir denied allegations of being obsessed with power, and reiterated his refusal to work with UMNO. Mahathir made no mention of Anwar Ibrahim or the agreement to pass the leadership baton to Anwar as agreed during 21 February meeting. Mahathir instead said the decision was up to the Dewan Rakyat.

Pakatan Harapan announced that they were nominating PKR president Anwar Ibrahim as prime minister following the previous night's meeting, despite publicly declaring support for Mahathir earlier, following Mahathir's televised speech. DAP lawmakers said Pakatan Harapan decided against a non-partisan "Mahathir government" as this would not be beholden to any party or coalition, which would give Mahathir free rein to do as he wanted.

==== 27 February ====
In the morning of 27 February, Mahathir once again went to the palace for an audience with the Agong. The contents of this meeting remain unknown, although it was alleged to have been a discussion on the formation of a new cabinet. In the afternoon, the secretary general of BERSATU, Marzuki Yahya, confirmed that Mahathir had withdrawn his resignation as the chairman of BERSATU. In an unrelated press conference on the evening of 27 February, Mahathir revealed that the Agong "[could not] find anyone with a distinct majority" to be elected as the prime minister and that a special session of parliament would be held on 2 March to address the predicament. If all else failed, he hinted that there would be a snap election.

==== 28 February ====
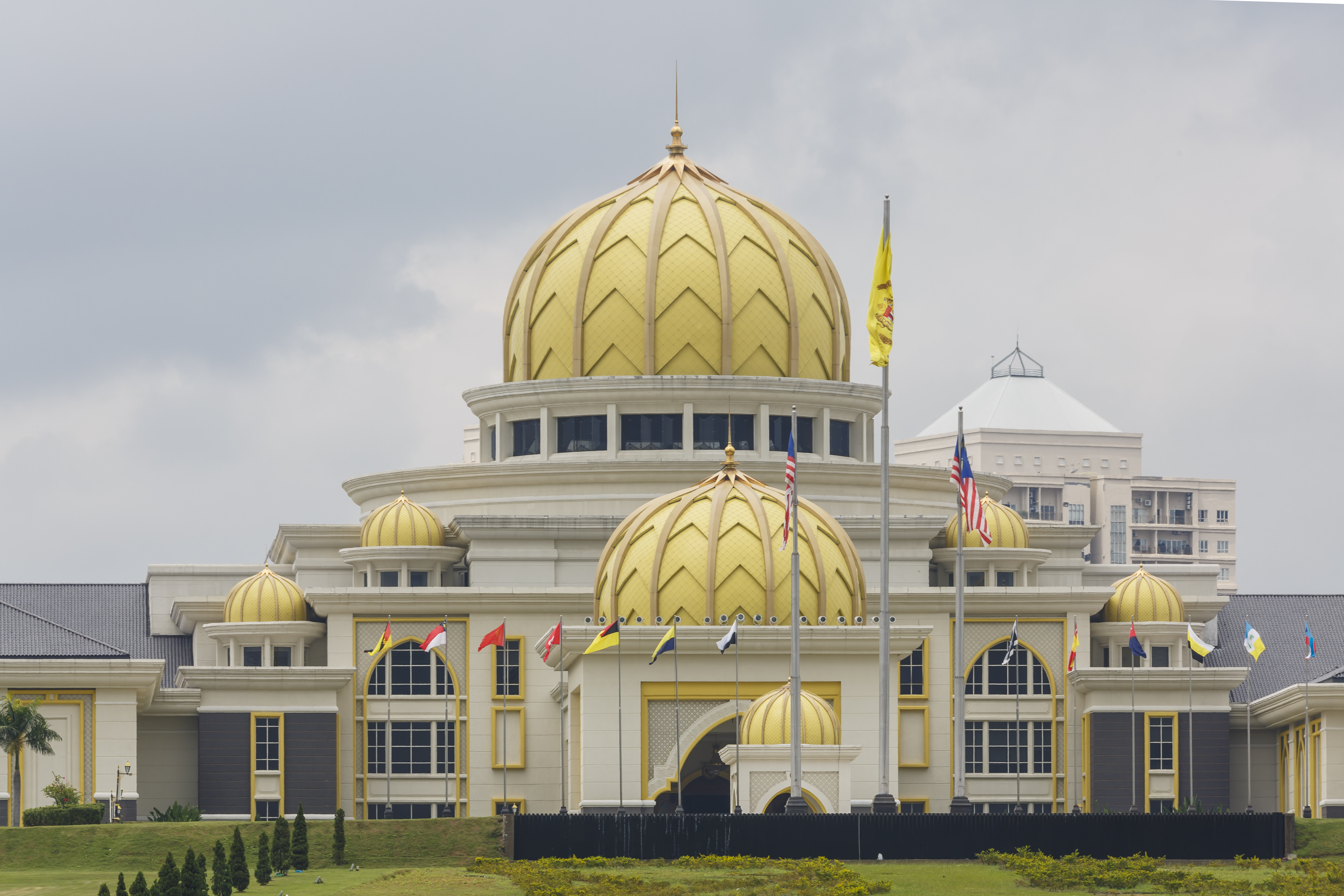
Istana Negara, the official residence of the Yang di-Pertuan Agong

A special Conference of Rulers meeting was held on the morning of 28 February at the Istana Negara to discuss the current political climate in the country, with all state rulers or their crown princes in attendance. They were also joined by General Affendi Buang, the Chief of Defence Forces, and Abdul Hamid Bador, the Inspector-General of Police.

Mohamad Ariff Md Yusof, the speaker of the Dewan Rakyat, contradicted Mahathir's previous announcement regarding the special sitting of the parliament. Ariff said that he had received a letter from Mahathir stating that the government agreed for a sitting to be called on 2 March but it did not adhere to parliamentary Standing Orders. In the evening, the palace released a statement saying that the Yang di-Pertuan Agong would call the leaders of political parties who have members in the parliament for an audience, to allow them to nominate their candidates for the position of prime minister to break the impasse. It also confirmed that the Agong had not found a candidate who had the confidence of the majority of the MPs to form a new government.

BERSATU then released a statement announcing their support for the party's president, Muhyiddin Yassin as the 8th Prime Minister, backed by the 26 BERSATU MPs and 10 others led by Azmin. Further 60 MPs from UMNO, PAS, Malaysian Chinese Association (MCA) and Malaysian Indian Congress (MIC) also announced their support for Muhyiddin. All the Muafakat Nasional MPs had also signed the new statutory declarations proposing Muhyiddin to be the next prime minister. Muhyiddin Yassin's aide also confirmed that Azmin Ali and 10 other former PKR MPs have officially joined BERSATU. However, BERSATU Supreme Council member Kadir Jasin claimed he was never invited for a discussion or informed about Muhyiddin's nomination.

==== 29 February ====
BERSATU Youth chief Syed Saddiq Syed Abdul Rahman declared that he would never work with those involved in corruption to form a government, referring to UMNO. BERSATU's youth wing Armada also posted a statement to say that it would continue to back the party's supreme council's decision in its meeting on 24 February to support Mahathir as prime minister, suggesting a split within BERSATU over Mahathir and Muhyiddin's candidacy.

In the morning of 29 February, the Pakatan Harapan presidential council held a meeting to discuss the political situation. They then announced their full support for Mahathir as the 8th Prime Minister, thus reversing the coalition's nomination of PKR president Anwar Ibrahim for prime minister. Following the announcement, Mahathir expressed confidence that he had the majority support to form the government and could be appointed as the prime minister for the third time after receiving assent from the Yang di-Pertuan Agong. In the afternoon, Anwar, as a representative of Pakatan Harapan went to Istana Negara to inform the Agong of the nomination changes.

Meanwhile, BERSATU's Muhyiddin Yassin and his allies including party leaders from UMNO, PAS, Gabungan Parti Sarawak (GPS), Parti Bersatu Rakyat Sabah (PBRS), and Homeland Solidarity Party (STAR) had an audience with the Agong. He also announced that his coalition consisting of BERSATU, UMNO, PAS, PBRS, GPS, and STAR would be called Perikatan Nasional. The new coalition claimed that they had majority support in parliament to elect a prime minister and to form a government.

Meanwhile, in Sarawak, Chong Chieng Jen who is vice-chairperson of DAP as well as chairman of DAP Sarawak, said they were willing to make concessions and work together with the GPS state government. The main purpose for this was to preserve the PH federal government. Chief Minister, Abang Abdul Rahman Johari Abang Openg snubbed Chong's peace gestures to the state coalition, recalling past remarks by DAP secretary-general Lim Guan Eng, that Sarawak would go bankrupt in the next three years. PKR announced that GPS MP Richard Riot Jaem had defected to join the party. However, he denied the allegation, stating that he was still a member of the GPS component party, Sarawak United Peoples' Party (SUPP), and had merely voiced out his support for Mahathir.

In the evening, the royal palace released a statement announcing that Muhyiddin, in the Yang di-Pertuan Agong's judgment, is likely to command the confidence of the majority of the MPs and was to be appointed as the 8th Prime Minister of Malaysia. The swearing-in ceremony would be held in the morning of 1 March in the Istana Negara.

Late that night, Mahathir, in a final attempt to challenge Muhyiddin's appointment, published a list of 115 Members of Parliament whom he claimed was supported him and enclosed the list with a letter to be delivered to the Agong following a Pakatan Harapan meeting. Notable MPs who were in the list are Mahathir, his son Mukhriz Mahathir and 4 other BERSATU MPs, members of Warisan, Jeffrey Kitingan of STAR, Maximus Ongkili of Gabungan BERSATU Sabah (GBS), Baru Bian and Jonathan Yasin who were previously in Azmin's bloc. However, the list was disputable as some MPs had denied backing Mahathir and some were ambiguous about their allegiance. Shamrahayu Abd Aziz, an academic and an expert on the constitution stated that any statutory declaration signed after the Agong's announcement would not make a difference, and the legal way to challenge Muhyiddin's appointment was through a vote of non-confidence in the Dewan Rakyat.

=== March: New prime minister, Perikatan Nasional inception, coronavirus pandemic ===
Minutes before the swearing ceremony of Muhyiddin, Mahathir said in a press conference that the Istana Negara had refused to grant him an audience to prove that Pakatan Harapan commanded the support of the majority of the Dewan Rakyat. He expressed disappointment towards Muhyiddin, who he alleged had been working on forming a government without Pakatan Harapan "for a long time". Mahathir also revealed that the confusion over the status of his chairmanship of BERSATU allowed Muhyiddin to appoint himself as the chairman, which he claimed was an illegal move.

Muhyiddin Yassin was sworn in as the eighth prime minister in front of the Agong at the Istana Negara on the morning of 1 March 2020.

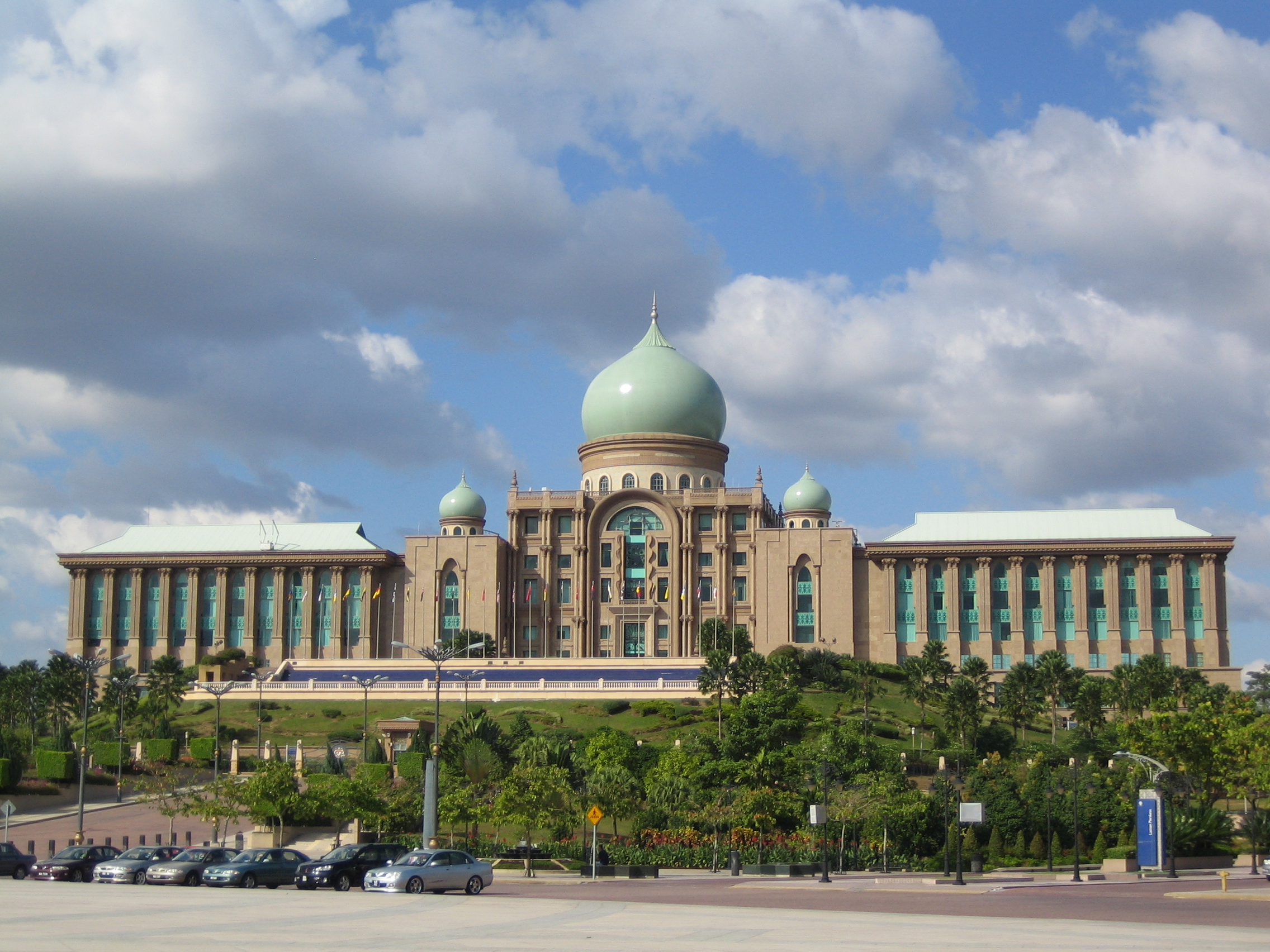
Perdana Putra in Putrajaya.

On the morning of 2 March, Muhyiddin arrived at the Perdana Putra, to begin his official duties as the prime minister. Muhyiddin held meetings with Chief Secretary Mohd Zuki Ali, General Affendi Buang, the Chief of Defence Forces, and Abdul Hamid Bador, the Inspector-General of Police. Later that night, Muhyiddin addressed the nation in his first televised message as the prime minister. In his address, he told the nation that he had no prior intention to become the prime minister and denied being a traitor but due to the political turmoil in the country, he stepped up in order to avoid prolonging the crisis further. He also reassured that he will only choose individuals who are clean, virtuous and of high calibre to be in his cabinet. Before ending his message, he thanked former prime minister Mahathir for his service to the country.

Within weeks of Muhyiddin becoming prime minister, the COVID-19 pandemic emerged as a serious crisis both in the country and globally. A Tablighi Jamaat religious event in Kuala Lumpur that took place during the political crisis had been a superspreading event, where the outbreak rapidly spread across the country. The political instability at the time was thought to have hampered the country's ability to respond. Muhyiddin announced that international borders would close and announced a strict Movement Control Order, putting the country into lockdown from 18 March.

On 4 March, the Speaker of the Dewan Rakyat, Mohamad Ariff Md Yusof announced that the Dewan Rakyat sitting which was originally scheduled to start on 9 March would be postponed to 18 May at the direction of Muhyiddin. The action was taken to allow the new prime minister to form his cabinet and for the newly appointed ministers to familiarise themselves with their ministry before the parliament sitting. However, PKR MP Wong Chen criticised Muhyiddin's move in delaying the opening of parliament, saying that it [was] a clear sign of weakness as he [was] unable to form a cabinet in a swift manner.

Muhyiddin on 10 March announced a Perikatan Nasional (PN) cabinet that he had picked from a mix of seasoned politicians, technocrats, stalwarts and close allies as ministers. However, this cabinet excluded the deputy prime minister position, which was instead replaced with 4 senior ministers for the first time.

=== May–July: Parliamentary sittings ===
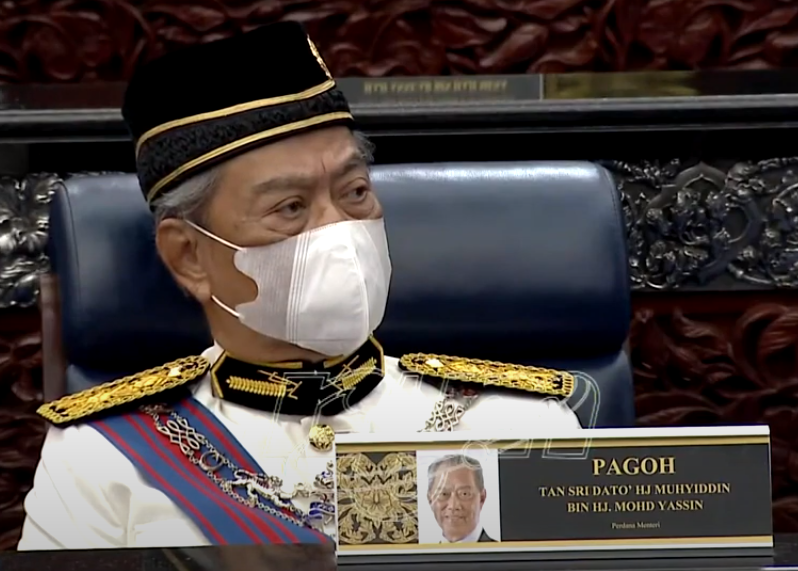
Prime Minister Muhyiddin Yassin in Parliament on 18 May 2020, when it reconvened without a vote of confidence to establish his legitimacy.

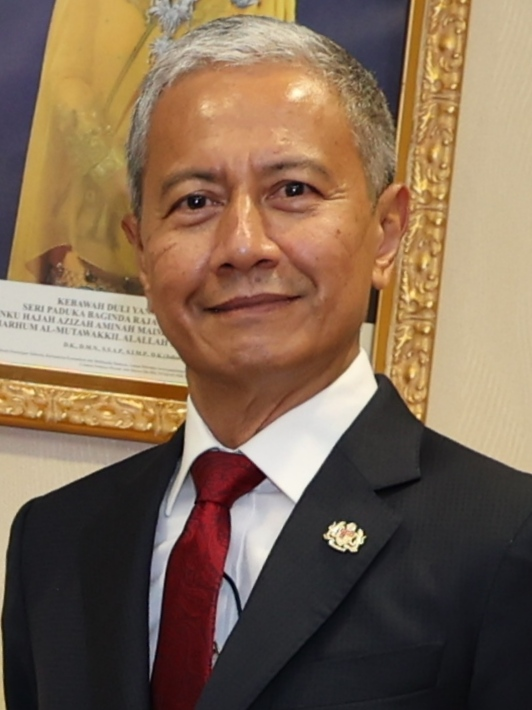
Azhar Azizan Harun was controversially appointed the new speaker of the Dewan Rakyat without a vote in July 2020.

In a Facebook Live session on 7 May, Anwar Ibrahim announced that he would be the new Leader of the Opposition for Pakatan Harapan in the new session of Parliament.

Speaker Mohamad Ariff announced on 7 May that he had received a letter on 1 May from Warisan leader Shafie Apdal seeking to table a motion of confidence in Dr Mahathir to show that he could command a majority in the Dewan Rakyat. The Speaker replied in a letter to Shafie that it was not in line with Article 43 of the Federal Constitution because it questioned the power of the Yang di-Pertuan Agong to appoint the prime minister. Mahathir sought a motion of no confidence against Muhyiddin as prime minister through a letter addressed to Ariff on 4 May. On 8 May, the Speaker accepted Dr Mahathir's motion and it would be debated when Parliament resumed on 18 May.

The speaker announced on 13 May that on the directions of the government, the parliament sitting on 18 May would only convene for the opening speech by the Agong initiating the new session, with no meeting after the speech. This meant that Mahathir's no confidence motion would not be debated as initially planned. Secretary to the Dewan Rakyat, Riduan Rahmat who was appointed on 22 February two days before the Sheraton Move, was demoted to Dewan Negara management secretary on 14 May. A source alleged that the secretary had attempted to keep the motion of no-confidence against Muhyiddin by Mahathir and Shafie a secret, leading to his demotion. In response, both Mahathir and Shafie along with Pakatan Harapan leaders condemned the move in a joint statement and accused the Perikatan Nasional government of being afraid to face the opposition in parliament.

The Agong addressed the political crisis by recounting that he tried to convince then-PM Mahathir not to resign but had no choice but to accept it as the latter insisted on resigning. The Agong ended his speech by calling on politicians not to drag the country into any further political crisis when there was already a COVID-19 pandemic crisis. The new seating arrangement in the Dewan Rakyat suggested that the Perikatan government had 113 seats in the Dewan Rakyat, after Masir Kujat of Parti Sarawak BERSATU (PSB) clarified that he was not supporting the government, and remained as opposition in federal and state levels. In a press conference attended by Mahathir, Shafie Apdal, Mukhriz Mahathir, Lim Guan Eng and Mat Sabu following the parliamentary seating, Mahathir insisted that BERSATU was still a component of Pakatan Harapan as its Supreme Council never decided to exit the coalition. In a leaked audio tape of the supreme council meeting in February, Muhyiddin had allegedly given Mahathir a week to decide on the party's direction as its chairman. "But before the one-week period, he took action as if he was not in PH. This goes against the party constitution and (any) approval by BERSATU (sic) Supreme Council," said Mahathir. Notably, neither Anwar nor any representatives of PKR attended the press conference.

Mahathir Mohamad, Mukhriz Mahathir, Syed Saddiq Syed Abdul Rahman, Maszlee Malik and Amiruddin Hamzah were expelled from BERSATU on 28 May. They decried the move as illegal and reflective of Muhyiddin's insecurities and dictatorial leadership. In a joint statement, they disputed the interpretation of their decision not to join Muhyiddin's government benches in Parliament as joining another party, which resulted in an automatic revocation of membership, according to the BERSATU party constitution. However, Muhyiddin defended the move and insisted that the five members who were sacked as having breached the party constitution by sitting with the opposition in Parliament.

Speaker Mohamad Ariff was removed from his position on the next parliamentary sitting on 13 July by a margin of two votes, 111 to 109 and was controversially replaced by recently resigned Electoral Commission (EC) chairman, Azhar Azizan Harun as the new speaker. Azhar's appointment took place amidst a shouting match between Pakatan Harapan and Perikatan Nasional MPs, after he was sworn in without a voting session by lawmakers, similar to the removal the incumbent Speaker. However, in his press conference with the media later, Azhar insisted that his appointment was legitimate, saying that there was no need for a voting session in the Lower House, as there was only one nominee. The Deputy Speaker, Nga Kor Ming announced his resignation in solidarity with Speaker Ariff. With the resignation of Nga, Prime Minister Muhyiddin announced Azalina Othman Said would replace Nga, making her the first female Deputy Speaker.

=== September–December: Elections in Sabah, Anwar Ibrahim's bid for premiership ===
On 23 September, at an afternoon press conference, Anwar Ibrahim, Leader of the Opposition, Pakatan Harapan (PH) coalition and People's Justice Party (PKR), announced and claimed that he had commanded a "strong, formidable, convincing majority" and further claimed that the Perikatan Nasional (PN) federal administration led by Prime Minister Muhyiddin Yassin "has fallen". However, Anwar also revealed that his planned audience with the Agong earlier on 22 September had been postponed due to the hospitalisation of the Agong to receive treatment for food poisoning and a sports injury at the National Heart Institute (IJN) on 21 September. When Anwar Ibrahim met the Agong on 13 October, he presented the number of 120 MPs to the Agong but did not submit the names of all the MPs supporting him.

The Sabah state election took place on 26 September, which led to a Gabungan Rakyat Sabah victory, supported by Perikatan Nasional, Barisan Nasional, major independent local parties and independent politician. After calls to allow postal voting or stop the election were dismissed over concerns on the spread of COVID-19, the vote was held in-person with certain Standard Operating Procedures (SOPs). The election led to a major COVID-19 outbreak in Sabah which later spread to other states across the country.

By-elections in the Bugaya constituency in Sabah and the Gerik constituency in Perak were both suspended at the request of Prime Minister Muhyiddin in December 2020 by invoking states of emergency over rising COVID-19 cases. Bugaya was thought to be the epicentre of the third wave of COVID-19 in Sabah. Muhyiddin had requested a nationwide state of emergency, but this was rejected by the Agong.

== 2021 ==
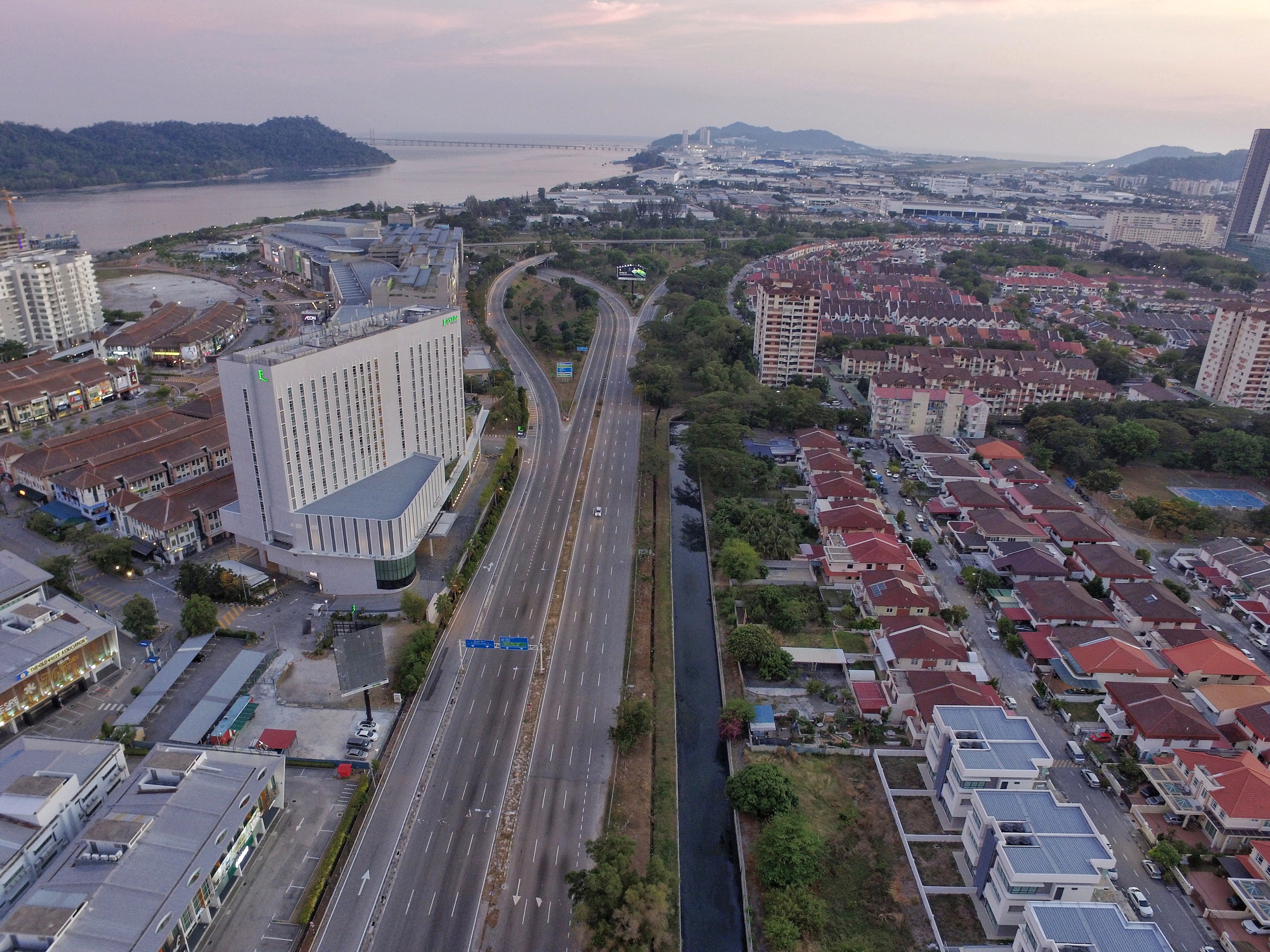
The extension of the Movement Control Order, enacted by the government in response to the COVID-19 pandemic, became a topic of contention within Perikatan Nasional in 2021.

=== January: Minority government, emergency declaration ===
On 13 December 2020, UMNO veteran Tengku Razaleigh Hamzah held a joint press conference with his longtime rival Mahathir Mohamad, where he publicly declared his rejection of the 2021 budget tabled by Muhyiddin. Both men also declared the PN government illegitimate. Razaleigh did not attend the subsequent budget vote held on 14 December, which was won by the government with 111 ayes against 108 nays.

With growing dissatisfaction within the party ranks over a number of issues, MPs from UMNO began to publicly call for withdrawal from the PN coalition government. Minister of Federal Territories Annuar Musa, who was firm in his stance of "no Anwar, no DAP" with regards to political cooperation, was sacked on 5 January 2021 as Barisan Nasional Secretary General. Annuar's successor Ahmad Maslan publicly called for a general election and labeled ongoing court cases against leading UMNO figures as "cruel". Annuar himself later alleged in a press conference that a number of UMNO MPs backed by UMNO President Ahmad Zahid Hamidi were planning on leaving Perikatan Nasional to form a coalition government with DAP and possibly other PH component parties. The statement was denied by both former Prime Minister Najib Razak and DAP Secretary-General Lim Guan Eng.

Machang MP Ahmad Jazlan Yaakub held a press conference to personally and publicly announce his withdrawal of support for the PN government and resignation as Chairman of the Malaysian Palm Oil Board (MPOB). Jazlan cited BERSATU's repeated attempts to "bully" UMNO as the primary reason for withdrawing support. This resulted in a further collapse of the PN administration led by Prime Minister Muhyiddin Yassin, at this point commanding the support of only 110 out of 220 MPs in the Dewan Rakyat, Parliament.

On 12 January, the Yang di-Pertuan Agong consented to a national emergency proclamation under Article 150 of the Malaysian Constitution to contain the COVID-19 pandemic, effective from 12 January 2021 to 1 August 2021. With the proclamation, parliament was officially suspended and no snap elections could be held. Mohamed Nazri Abdul Aziz held a press conference on the same day to publicly and personally announce his withdrawal of support, declaring he was no longer aligned with PN as an MP, although his coalition was, further reducing Muhyiddin Yassin's majority to only 109 out of 220 MPs. His withdrawal of support is the third one from his coalition after the withdrawals of support of Tengku Razaleigh Hamzah (Gua Musang MP) and Ahmad Jazlan Yaakub (Machang MP). Nazri told the press that the proclamation was only further evidence that Muhyiddin was unable to prove he commands majority support in parliament if a confidence motion was held.

On 18 January, Khairuddin Abu Hassan sued Muhyiddin and his administration over the latter's announcement of a nationwide state of emergency. Khairuddin believed that what Muhyiddin was unlawful and unconstitutional, since Muhyiddin had already lost the majority needed to hold government.

On 23 January, opposition leader Anwar Ibrahim said 115 MPs were against the proclamation of the emergency. Media reports had previously claimed that many MPs had submitted an appeal letter to the King to end the state of emergency imposed on 13 January to fight COVID-19. The opposition claimed the prime minister's move was only to hold on to power, with Parliament suspended.

=== February–July: Royal consent for parliament, more crossovers ===
The Malaysian Houses of Parliament in Kuala Lumpur, which hosts the Dewan Rakyat

On 24 February, King Abdullah consented for parliament to reconvene during the emergency period after an audience with President of the Dewan Negara Rais Yatim and Speaker of the Dewan Rakyat Azhar Azizan Harun, but left it to the Prime Minister to set a date.

On 28 February, rumours were rife that two Pakatan Harapan (PH) and People's Justice Party (PKR) MPs, Tebrau MP Steven Choong and Julau MP Larry Sng would become independents and declare support for the ruling Perikatan Nasional (PN) coalition to provide it with a majority in the Dewan Rakyat, where it only had the support of 109 MPs out of 111 needed for a majority. In the afternoon on the same day, Julau MP Larry Sng confirmed the rumours and signed statutory declarations (SDs) in support of PN with Choong, handing them to Prime Minister Muhyiddin. PN thus regained majority support after the withdrawals of three BN MPs in January, whereas the opposition was once again reduce to a minority in the Dewan Rakyat.

On 4 March, UMNO announced its support for PN only remained until the dissolution of Parliament, whereby it would withdraw its support after.

On 13 March, PH and PKR Kuala Langat MP and vice-president of PKR Xavier Jayakumar Arulanandam announced his departure from PKR and resignation as PKR Vice-president, crossing over to support the PN led by Muhyiddin Yassin, becoming the third Opposition MP to do so in less than a month after Larry and Steven, as well as strengthening the majority support of PN in the Dewan Rakyat, PN had the support of 112 MPs following his crossover. Parliament carried on being closed after the government decided not to reconvene due to the COVID-19 pandemic. However, the reason was not accepted by the Opposition, leading them to form a Committee for Ending the Emergency Declaration and to launch a petition to appeal for an end to the state of emergency.

On 4 June, Minister in the Prime Minister's Department (Parliament and Law) Takiyuddin Hassan announced that the government was studying ways to reconvene Parliament by holding hybrid sessions virtually and physically to divide the MPs into two groups to attend virtual and physical sessions.

On 7 June, a loyalist of former Prime Minister Mahathir, who strongly opposed the Muhyiddin government, Khairuddin Abu Hassan revealed that the Agong had invited the heads of the major political parties to listen to their views on the current issues ranging from politics, the economy, the COVID-19 pandemic from 9 to 15 June 2021. The invitees included the Prime Minister, Chairman of PN, President of BERSATU Muhyiddin Yassin, Leader of the Opposition, Chairman of PH and President of PKR Anwar Ibrahim, Deputy Chairman of PH, Secretary-General of DAP Lim Guan Eng, former prime minister and Chairman of PEJUANG Mahathir Mohamad, Special Envoy of the Prime Minister to Middle East and President of PAS Abdul Hadi Awang, and former deputy prime minister, Chairman of BN and President of UMNO Ahmad Zahid Hamidi.

On 15 June, Prime Minister Muhyiddin announced that Parliament might be reconvened in September or October 2021 during the third phase of the National Recovery Plan through a televised address. On 16 June 2021, King Abdullah held a special meeting of the Conference of Rulers (COR) at Istana Negara involving rulers of nine states to discuss the views of the invitees of the audiences and issued a statement that the COR agreed that Parliament should be reconvened as soon as possible, and that the Emergency declaration should not be extended and instead be lifted on 1 August 2021. On 20 June 2021, Prime Minister Muhyiddin claimed that a committee consisting of Government and Opposition MPs was formed to look into every aspect of the reconvening of Parliament to avoid any issues. On 21 June 2021, BN Chairman and UMNO President Ahmad Zahid warned the PN government against treason and disrespect towards the royal institution and gave it a 14-day deadline to reconvene Parliament. He also announced that the Supreme Council of UMNO would meet to discuss the next course of action if their requests and warnings were not fulfilled by the deadline.

On 2 July, Mohamed Nazri Abdul Aziz claimed that he has returned to support Prime Minister Muhyiddin and withdrew his withdrawal of support declared on 12 January in the same year. His return of support further strengthened the PN government by increasing its majority in Parliament of 112 MPs to 113 MPs.

On 5 July, on the deadline set by UMNO, the Prime Minister's Office (PMO) announced that the Parliament would finally reconvene with two special sessions of Dewan Rakyat from 26 July to 2 August for five days and of Dewan Negara from 3 to 5 August for three days. The PN government also advised the MPs to seize this opportunity to help the government in containing the COVID-19 pandemic by expressing their views and suggestions. However, on 7 July 2021, Pakatan Harapan (PH) presidential council urged the PN government to extend the five-day special Dewan Rakyat session as it was too short to discuss key issues that have been highlighted by the Yang di-Pertuan Agong and regretted that the PN government only intended to provide an explanation on the National Recovery Plan (NRP) without any debate, while the Emergency proclamation and Emergency Ordinance would only be tabled and not discussed or decided.

=== July: Political instability increases ===
On 7 July, a minor Cabinet reshuffle aimed at distributing more powers and positions to UMNO took place by promoting two UMNO Cabinet members, namely Ismail Sabri Yaakob from Senior Minister (Security) to the 13th Deputy Prime Minister and Hishammuddin Hussein, Minister of Foreign Affairs to Senior Minister (Security). It was seen as a gesture to ease the tensions between UMNO and PN as well as to persuade UMNO, which has been unsatisfied with PN due to the unequal distribution of powers and positions, to retain their support for Muhyiddin as PM and PN as government.

However, on 8 July 2021, after a UMNO supreme council meeting had been held, BN Chairman and UMNO President Ahmad Zahid addressed the media virtually and announced that UMNO would officially withdraw support for PM Muhyiddin with immediate effect. He cited the government's failure to contain the COVID-19 pandemic, dissatisfaction with the economic response and the extension of the Movement Control Order. He also called for the appointment of a new prime minister who would concentrate on containing the COVID-19 pandemic, before the next election immediately after the nation achieves herd immunity against COVID-19 through the vaccination programme. Later that day, the Attorney General of Malaysia Idrus Harun said that Muhyiddin and his Cabinet could still exercise power as there was no clear evidence to show that the team had lost the majority of lawmakers. In addition, BERSATU's information chief Wan Saiful Wan Jan rejected accusations by Ahmad Zahid that the Government failed.

On 10 July, UMNO's vice-president and newly appointed Deputy Prime Minister Ismail Sabri Yaakob said the majority of UMNO's supreme council disagreed with Ahmad Zahid's directive to withdraw support for Muhyiddin at this point amid the current pandemic as it was not a "reasonable move", and that efforts should be focused on helping people during these times instead of politicking. Although UMNO decided earlier in a 2020 meeting to withdraw support for Perikatan Nasional, the decision did not have to be carried out now, saying that this had to be done at the right time. Four days later, the Cabinet including all nine ministers from UMNO agreed to support Muhyiddin as prime minister to lead Malaysia out of the crisis.

Parliament reconvened on 26 July for the first time in 2021, for a special five-day session. The Agong requested that State of Emergency measures be discussed in Parliament; the government stated no other issues were to be debated. The session was chaotic; no debate or vote was held on COVID-19 emergency measures and opposition leader Anwar Ibrahim and former Prime Minister Mahathir accused the government of not fulfilling the Agong's request. Prime Minister Muhyiddin also left early, which incensed the opposition. Delays occurred when positive COVID-19 cases were detected among parliamentarians.

Law Minister Takiyuddin Hassan also told Parliament on 26 July that the State of Emergency had been annulled on 21 July. On 29 July, the Yang di-Pertuan Agong released a rare rebuke criticising the government, and singled out Takiyuddin in particular, accusing him of misleading Parliament on the revocation of the state of emergency which he had not approved. The palace said that the Agong was "amat dukacita" (deeply disappointed), and said Takiyuddin and Attorney-General Idrus Harun did not fulfil their promise to the Yang di-Pertuan Agong to have the State of Emergency debated. Opposition Leader Anwar Ibrahim read the Agong's statement aloud in Parliament, accusing the Muhyiddin cabinet of "violat[ing] the constitution and insult[ing] the royal institution" and filed a no-confidence motion against Muhyiddin. Deputy Speaker Mohd Rashid Hasnon dismissed the Agong's letter as a "media statement". Other opposition lawmakers shouted "treason" and "resign" as Anwar read the Agong's statement.

The special parliamentary session was suspended on 31 July when 11 positive COVID-19 cases were detected among its members. The opposition criticised this, accusing the government of further delaying parliamentary debate.

On 31 July, hundreds of protesters attempted to gather in Merdeka Square, Kuala Lumpur, calling for the resignation of Prime Minister Muhyiddin Yassin over his and the Malaysian government's handling of the COVID-19 pandemic.

=== August: Fall of Perikatan Nasional government, new prime minister ===
After the nationwide State of Emergency ended, a new one was declared in Sarawak starting from 2 August, delaying the Sarawak state election to February 2022 which would have otherwise occurred in 2021.

On 2 August, opposition MPs attempted to enter parliament in defiance of the session's suspension over COVID-19 cases detected in the building, but were blocked by police. They instead gathered in protest at Merdeka Square and called for Prime Minister Muhyiddin to resign. Anwar Ibrahim and Mahathir Mohamad were both in attendance. Anwar had been quoted saying that Muhyiddin's government had lost its majority support and called for its resignation. They had attempted to march to the parliament from Merdeka Square, until they were blocked by the Federal Reserve Unit (FRU), who are usually called to handle riots. Afterwards, the MPs dispersed peacefully, and police indicated that the lawmakers would be summoned for questioning.

On 3 August, the President of UMNO Ahmad Zahid Hamidi along with 10 other UMNO MPs held a press conference announcing the withdrawal of UMNO's support for Muhyiddin as prime minister.

Following the announcement of UMNO's withdrawal, two UMNO cabinet ministers - Minister of Energy and Natural Resources Shamsul Anuar Nasarah and Minister of Higher Education Noraini Ahmad - resigned from their posts on 3 August and 6 August respectively, citing loyalty to the party.

On 4 August, Prime Minister Muhyiddin Yassin and the Perikatan Nasional government held a special address to the nation alongside the Deputy Prime Minister and Vice President of UMNO Ismail Sabri Yaakob, whereby he announced that he would not resign, and that he would table a motion of confidence to establish the legitimacy of his position in the Dewan Rakyat in September. He also added that the Yang di-Pertuan Agong had sent him a letter regarding 8 UMNO lawmakers' request to withdraw support for Muhyiddin, and that Muhyiddin must resign should he lose the majority support in parliament. A few other PN MPs stated that Muhyiddin still possessed a majority in parliament. Pakatan Harapan MPs rejected the claims, maintaining that Muhyiddin and the Cabinet should resign. They also added that the motion should be tabled before 9 August to end the issue of the prime minister's legitimacy. Several parties also emphasised an immediate tabling of the confidence motion.

Following Ismail Sabri's support for Muhyiddin, this started a split in the party as some UMNO MPs continued their support for Muhyiddin while some MPs joined Ahmad Zahid Hamidi in withdrawing their support for Muhyiddin. The support totalled up to 31 Barisan Nasional members.

On 9 August, UMNO's website displayed documents of UMNO president Ahmad Zahid Hamidi, of whom presented a list of 14 UMNO MPs to the Yang di-Pertuan Agong, to inform the King of their signed statutory declarations dated 29 July to 3 August to withdraw support for Prime Minister Muhyiddin Yassin. The list includes the 11 MPs that held the press conference on 3 August, former Minister of Energy and Natural Resources Shamsul Anuar Nasarah, and both Sabah UMNO MPs Bung Moktar Radin and Mohamad Alamin.

By 9 August, 15 UMNO MPs had withdrawn their support for Muhyiddin as prime minister.

For Muhyiddin as Prime Minister
Against Muhyiddin as Prime Minister

List of UMNO MPs
No.	Seat	Member of Parliament	Current Positions in Cabinet / Government / Organisation	Current Positions in UMNO
P001	(Perlis) Padang Besar	Zahidi Zainul Abidin	Deputy Minister of Communications and Multimedia	Supreme Council Member
P003	(Perlis) Arau	Shahidan Kassim	1Malaysia People's Housing Programme Chairman; National Housing Corporation Chairman	
P007	(Kedah) Padang Terap	Mahdzir Khalid	Tenaga Nasional Chairman	Vice-president
P016	(Kedah) Baling	Abdul Azeez Abdul Rahim		Supreme Council Member
P026	(Kelantan) Ketereh	Annuar Musa	Minister of Federal Territories	Supreme Council Member
P029	(Kelantan) Machang	Ahmad Jazlan Yaakub	Malaysian Palm Oil Board Chairman (resigned)	Kelantan State Chairman; Supreme Council Member
P032	(Kelantan) Gua Musang	Tengku Razaleigh Hamzah		Chairman of Advisor Council
P033	(Terengganu) Besut	Idris Jusoh	Federal Land Development Authority Chairman	
P041	(Penang) Kepala Batas	Reezal Merican Naina Merican	Minister of Youth and Sports	Supreme Council Member
P055	(Perak) Lenggong	Shamsul Anuar Nasarah	Minister of Energy and Natural Resources (resigned)	Supreme Council Member
P061	(Perak) Padang Rengas	Mohamed Nazri Abdul Aziz		
P067	(Perak) Kuala Kangsar	Mastura Mohd Yazid	Deputy Minister in the Prime Minister's Department (Special Functions)	
P069	(Perak) Parit	Mohd Nizar Zakaria	National Population and Family Development Board Chairman	
P073	(Perak) Pasir Salak	Tajuddin Abdul Rahman	Prasarana Malaysia Chairman (resigned)	Supreme Council Member
P075	(Perak) Bagan Datuk	Ahmad Zahid Hamidi		President
P078	(Pahang) Cameron Highlands	Ramli Mohd Nor	Amanah Raya Berhad Chairman	
P079	(Pahang) Lipis	Abdul Rahman Mohamad	Deputy Minister of Rural Development I	Supreme Council Member
P081	(Pahang) Jerantut	Ahmad Nazlan Idris	Malaysian Rubber Board Chairman (resigned)	
P084	(Pahang) Paya Besar	Mohd Shahar Abdullah	Deputy Minister of Finance II	
P085	(Pahang) Pekan	Mohd Najib Abdul Razak		
P086	(Pahang) Maran	Ismail Abdul Muttalib	Deputy Minister of Housing and Local Government	
P087	(Pahang) Kuala Krau	Ismail Mohamed Said	Deputy Minister of Home Affairs I	
P090	(Pahang) Bera	Ismail Sabri Yaakob	Deputy Prime Minister; Minister of Defence	Vice-president
P091	(Pahang) Rompin	Hasan Arifin	Water Asset Management Company Chairman	
P095	(Selangor) Tanjong Karang	Noh Omar	Perbadanan Usahawan Nasional Berhad Chairman	Selangor State Chairman; Supreme Council Member
P125	Putrajaya	Tengku Adnan Tengku Mansor		Treasurer-General
P126	(Negeri Sembilan) Jelebu	Jalaluddin Alias	UDA Holdings Berhad Chairman	Supreme Council Member
P127	(Negeri Sembilan) Jempol	Mohd Salim Shariff	Rubber Industry Smallholders Development Authority Chairman	
P131	(Negeri Sembilan) Rembau	Khairy Jamaluddin	Minister of Science, Technology and Innovation; Coordinating Minister of the National COVID-19 Immunization Program	
P139	(Malacca) Jasin	Ahmad Hamzah	Deputy Minister of Agriculture and Food Industries I	
P147	(Johor) Parit Sulong	Noraini Ahmad	Minister of Higher Education (resigned)	Deputy President; Women Chief
P153	(Johor) Sembrong	Hishammuddin Hussein	Senior Minister (Security); Minister of Foreign Affairs	
P155	(Johor) Tenggara	Adham Baba	Minister of Health	
P156	(Johor) Kota Tinggi	Halimah Mohamed Sadique	Minister of National Unity	
P157	(Johor) Pengerang	Azalina Othman Said	Deputy Speaker of the Dewan Rakyat	Supreme Council Member
P164	(Johor) Pontian	Ahmad Maslan		Secretary-General; Supreme Council Member
P176	(Sabah) Kimanis	Mohamad Alamin	Intellectual Property Corporation of Malaysia Chairman	
P187	(Sabah) Kinabatangan	Bung Moktar Radin	First Deputy Chief Minister of Sabah	Sabah State Chairman; Supreme Council Member

For	Against	Total
23	15	38

On 11 August, top leaders in the ruling Perikatan Nasional coalition flocked to the Perdana Putra Complex to attend a political meeting with Prime Minister Muhyiddin Yassin.

On 12 August, Minister of Communications and Multimedia Saifuddin Abdullah announced that the confidence motion would be held on 7 September. In addition, Johor Sultan Ibrahim Iskandar said he would not hesitate to dissolve the Johor State Legislative Assembly if politicians continued to struggle for power and destabilise the state.

On 13 August in a televised address, Muhyiddin offered a series of major concessions to opposition parties, including opposition leader Anwar, in an attempt to form a unity government ahead of an expected vote of confidence scheduled for September. These included a constitutional amendment to introduce two-term limits for the Prime Minister, equal financial allocation for all MPs, greater resources for the Leader of the Opposition, introducing an anti-party hopping bill in Parliament, balanced parliamentary committees, allowing 18-year-olds to vote, and a general election by July 2022, among others. These were unanimously rejected by all opposition parties, who characterised the proposal as corruption and reiterated calls for Muhyiddin to resign.

On 15 August, Mohd Redzuan Md Yusof, the Minister in the Prime Minister's Department (Special Functions) said that Prime Minister Muhyiddin Yassin would announce his resignation the following day. On August 17, the Muhyiddin cabinet was dissolved after the ministers handed in their resignation to His Majesty the Yang Di-Pertuan Agong, with Muhyiddin remaining as caretaker prime minister until a new leader was appointed. Muhyiddin admitted he had lost majority support in a televised address, and said that he would not "conspire with kleptocrats, or interfere with the judiciary or turn his back on the Constitution to stay in power". The Palace also announced that an election would not be held due to the ongoing pandemic, and that the Agong would once again appoint the next premier.

On 17 August, the Yang di-Pertuan Agong again met with MPs, asking them to send him their choice for next prime minister via fax, email or WhatsApp by 4pm on 18 August. Political leaders met with MPs in an attempt to gain supporters. Local media reported Ismail Sabri Yaakob, Anwar Ibrahim, Tengku Razaleigh Hamzah and Shafie Apdal were in the running. In addition, the Yang di-Pertuan Agong made it clear to parties that a new form of politics that brings peace and harmony was needed, with all parties reaching a consensus towards that.

According to reports the following day, UMNO nominated Ismail Sabri Yaakob as their candidate for prime minister and was supported by PAS and BERSATU, with Anwar Ibrahim nominated by the Pakatan Harapan coalition and supported by its component parties. UMNO initially suggested 3 potential PM candidates — Ahmad Zahid Hamidi, Mohamad Hasan and Ismail Sabri Yaakob. However, Zahid withdrew himself and Mohamad was ineligible as a non-MP. This automatically paved the way for Ismail Sabri. It was also reported that an UMNO MP did not support Sabri, which was revealed to be Tengku Razaleigh Hamzah. Meanwhile, the Yang di-Pertuan Agong called for a meeting two days later with all state rulers and asked that a confidence motion be tabled to confirm the majority.

On 19 August, meetings began with the Yang di-Pertuan Agong to verify support of Members of Parliarment (MP) who nominated Ismail Sabri as a candidate. Istana Negara received nominations for the future prime minister from 220 members of the Dewan Rakyat, each through a statutory declaration on 18 August 2021. From the declaration letters, a total of 114 members of the Dewan Rakyat nominated Ismail Sabri, a sufficient majority to form the government. Following that, the Yang di-Pertuan Agong agreed to grant an audience with the 114 members of the Dewan Rakyat to confirm their trust in Ismail Sabri who was nominated to be appointed as the next prime minister. Subsequently, Perikatan Nasional chairperson Muhyiddin affirmed support for Ismail Sabri provided the Cabinet did not include MPs facing criminal charges. An online petition opposing Ismail Sabri's appointment gained over 200,000 signatures within the first 8 hours, and subsequently garnered more than 350,000 signatures.

On 20 August, the Yang di-Pertuan Agong named UMNO's vice president, Ismail Sabri Yaakob as the nation's 9th Prime Minister in accordance with Article 40(2)(a) and Article 43(2)(a) of the Federal Constitution after being satisfied that he commanded the confidence of the majority in Parliament.

Ismail Sabri was formally appointed and sworn in as the ninth prime minister of Malaysia in front of the Yang di-Pertuan Agong at the Istana Negara on the afternoon of 21 August 2021. Ismail Sabri formed his new cabinet after getting approval from the Yang di-Pertuan Agong following a meeting on 26 August at the Istana Abdulaziz in Pahang, Kuantan. The Prime Minister's Office replied to the media that the cabinet list would be announced at 11am the next day and the swearing-in of all ministers would be done on 30 August 2021. When the new cabinet was announced, it consisted of ministers mostly retained from the Muhyiddin cabinet with some minor changes.

Opposition parties criticised the newly formed cabinet. The leader of the opposition, Anwar Ibrahim described it as a "recycled cabinet" of Muhyiddin's government, and stated that a majority of the people were disappointed with the new cabinet ministers as they had failed to fulfil their previous duties during the PN administration, and that the new cabinet could not bring in confidence among domestic and foreign investors. DAP's secretary-general, Lim Guan Eng questioned the competency of the new cabinet line-up unveiled by the Prime Minister.

Deputy Minister for Education II Mohamad Alamin could not attend the swearing-in ceremony due to being infected with COVID-19, nor did Ismail Sabri or Minister for Entrepreneurship Development and Cooperative Noh Omar due to them self-quarantining after being in contact with undisclosed COVID-19 infected contacts.

=== September: Reconvening of parliament, MoU on bipartisan cooperation ===
On 10 September 2021, the cabinet agreed to implement key reforms like an Anti-Party Hopping Bill, equal membership in parliamentary committees, consulting on every Bill, having the Opposition Leader the same amenities as a cabinet minister, limiting a prime minister's term to 10 years and speeding up an amendment for 18-year-olds to vote and stand in elections. The following day, the opposition indicated its willingness to accept the deal in the interest of the country.

On 12 September 2021, the government led by Prime Minister Ismail Sabri Yaakob and opposition led by Leader of the Opposition Anwar Ibrahim agreed to sign a Memorandum of Understanding (MoU) on bipartisan cooperation and proposed reforms for greater political cooperation and stability during the COVID-19 pandemic. The MoU was signed the following day with elections not expected before 31 July 2022. Media commentary noted the significant milestone for Malaysian politics, given bipartisan cooperation has not occurred in the history of the country.

=== October–December: Elections in Malacca and Sarawak ===
The Malacca State Legislative Assembly was dissolved on 4 October when four members withdrew support for Chief Minister Sulaiman Md Ali, triggering the 2021 Malacca state election. The government announced it would seek expert advice over whether the election can be held safely given the ongoing COVID-19 pandemic, or whether a state-wide state of emergency could be introduced to postpone it. The state election was carried out 20 November 2021 with strict Standard Operating Procedures, where Barisan Nasional won with a two-thirds majority of 21 seats in the Malacca State Legislative Assembly.

On 3 November 2021, Istana Negara announced that Yang di-Pertuan Agong Al-Sultan Abdullah Ri'ayatuddin Al-Mustafa Billah Shah consented to lift the state of emergency, thus the Sarawak State Legislative Assembly dissolved automatically and the state election was to be held within 60 days to elect a new state government. On 18 December 2021, GPS won with a two-thirds majority, winning 76 of 82 contested seats in the Sarawak State Legislative Assembly.

== 2022 ==
=== January–March: Elections in Johor ===
The snap election was called prematurely after the government led by Menteri Besar Hasni Mohammad had lost a simple majority in the legislature, being left with a minority government of just 28 seats, above one seat against the 27 seats of the opposition following the death of Kempas assemblyman and former Menteri Besar Osman Sapian on 21 December 2021 before the dissolution. The Sultan of Johor, Sultan Ibrahim Ismail consented to the dissolution of the Johor State Legislative Assembly on 22 January 2022, paving the way for state polls within 60 days.

On 12 March, Barisan Nasional (BN) continued its landslide winning streak in recent state elections, winning 40 seats and a two-thirds majority. Pakatan Harapan (PH) suffered heavy losses, winning only 12 seats. Perikatan Nasional (PN) won just 3 seats. The Malaysian United Democratic Alliance (MUDA) won 1 seat in its election debut.

=== April–July: UMNO leadership crisis ===
On 24 June, Pasir Salak MP Tajuddin Abdul Rahman was removed from UMNO supreme council. After his removal decision, Tajuddin accepted the decision and held a press conference to reveal the UMNO leadership crisis, which includes that UMNO was going to split between two camps, which are Zahid's camp and Ismail's camp; UMNO President, Zahid Hamidi's attempt to become PM and SD declaration for Anwar to become PM that happened during 2020 and 2021. Tajuddin also asked for Zahid's resignation as UMNO President for good because Zahid is currently facing a corruption trial in court.

=== August–November: Constitutional amendment and general election ===
A constitutional amendment was passed, which prohibits members of parliament from switching political parties. Several UMNO lawmakers began calling for a snap election before the end of 2022 to resolve ongoing infighting in the party and obtain a stronger mandate, with the UMNO Supreme Council agreeing to this by the end of September. On 10 October 2022, Ismail Sabri announced that the 14th Parliament had been dissolved to pave way for the upcoming 15th general election, which would be held within 60 days.

On 20 October, the Election Commission revealed the polling date for the 15th general election set on 19 November.

On 19 November, for the first time in Malaysian history, the results of the 2022 election resulted in a hung Parliament whereby no alliance had gained enough seats to form the next government. While the far-right, Islamist Malaysian Islamic Party won the most number of seats for a single party in the election, the Pakatan Harapan coalition led by Anwar Ibrahim won the highest number of seats for a coalition in the Dewan Rakyat, but former Prime Minister Muhyiddin Yassin and leader of the Perikatan Nasional coalition claimed to have a sufficient majority to be appointed as prime minister. Negotiations between party members and party leaders are taking place to determine if there is a single leader who can command the confidence of a majority of MPs, for subsequent appointment as the 10th Prime Minister of Malaysia. The Yang di-Pertuan Agong, Al-Sultan Abdullah, gave all party leaders and coalition leaders a deadline of 2 pm on Monday, 21 November 2022 MST, to submit the name of their preferred candidate for prime minister, to the Speaker of the Dewan Rakyat. The deadline was further extended by 24 hours until Tuesday, 22 November 2022. Barisan Nasional announced on Tuesday, 22 November that they will not support either PH or PN in the formation of the federal government.

The royal palace stated that after the Yang di-Pertuan Agong reviewed the nominations for prime minister, he found that "no member of parliament has the majority support to be appointed prime minister", so the Yang di-Pertuan Agong summoned Anwar and Muhyiddin to meet him. After the meeting, Muhyiddin said that the Yang di-Pertuan Agong proposed a unity government between Pakatan Harapan and Perikatan National, but Muhyiddin rejected it as Perikatan National "will not cooperate" with Pakatan Harapan. Instead, PN met some members of BN at St Regis Hotel. Meanwhile, Anwar acknowledged that the prime minister had yet to be determined, while stating that "given time, I think we will secure a simple majority".

On 23 November, the Yang di-Pertuan Agong met with BN and GPS leaders in the royal palace. After discontent from Sarawak over GPS working with PN, GPS stated that it was up to the Yang di-Pertuan Agong to appoint the Prime Minister; while Parti Warisan voiced support for a government with PH and BN. GRS leader Hajiji Noor stated that GRS would abide by the Yang di-Pertuan Agong's wishes on forming a new government, including if a unity government is formed. On 24 November, Ahmad Maslan of UMNO stated that the party's supreme council has agreed to follow the wishes of the Yang di-Pertuan Agong for BN to join a unity government which is not led by PN. Considering these final decisions, PH chairman Anwar Ibrahim finally was sworn in as Malaysia's 10th Prime Minister at 5 pm MST on 24 November 2022, by the Yang di-Pertuan Agong, Al-Sultan Abdullah.

== Impact ==
=== Parliament ===
List of seats that changed allegiance in the Dewan Rakyat
No.	Seat	Member	Previous Party (GE14 Result)	Previous Party (before February 2020)	Current Party (as of May 2023)
P001	(Perlis) Padang Besar	Zahidi Zainul Abidin	Barisan Nasional (UMNO)	Barisan Nasional (UMNO)	Pakatan Harapan (PKR)
P003	(Perlis) Arau	Shahidan Kassim	Barisan Nasional (UMNO)	Barisan Nasional (UMNO)	Perikatan Nasional (PAS)
P004	(Kedah) Langkawi	Mahathir Mohamad	Pakatan Harapan (BERSATU)	Pakatan Harapan (BERSATU)	Gerakan Tanah Air (PUTRA)
P005	(Kedah) Jerlun	Mukhriz Mahathir	Pakatan Harapan (BERSATU)	Pakatan Harapan (BERSATU)	Gerakan Tanah Air (Pejuang)
P006	(Kedah) Kubang Pasu	Amiruddin Hamzah	Pakatan Harapan (BERSATU)	Pakatan Harapan (BERSATU)	Gerakan Tanah Air (Pejuang)
P019	(Kelantan) Tumpat	Che Abdullah Mat Nawi	PAS	PAS	Barisan Nasional (UMNO)
P026	(Kelantan) Ketereh	Annuar Musa	Barisan Nasional (UMNO)	Barisan Nasional (UMNO)	Perikatan Nasional (PAS)
P027	(Kelantan) Tanah Merah	Ikmal Hisham	Barisan Nasional (UMNO)	Pakatan Harapan (BERSATU)	Perikatan Nasional (BERSATU)
P030	(Kelantan) Jeli	Mustapa Mohamed	Barisan Nasional (UMNO)	Pakatan Harapan (BERSATU)	Perikatan Nasional (BERSATU)
P035	(Terengganu) Kuala Nerus	Khairuddin Razali	PAS	PAS	Barisan Nasional (UMNO)
P038	Hulu Terengganu	Rosol Wahid	Barisan Nasional (UMNO)	Pakatan Harapan (BERSATU)	Perikatan Nasional (BERSATU)
P042	(Penang) Tasek Gelugor	Shabudin Yahaya	Barisan Nasional (UMNO)	Pakatan Harapan (BERSATU)	Perikatan Nasional (BERSATU)
P047	(Penang) Nibong Tebal	Mansor Othman	Pakatan Harapan (PKR)	Pakatan Harapan (PKR)	Perikatan Nasional (BERSATU)
P056	(Perak) Larut	Hamzah Zainudin	Barisan Nasional (UMNO)	Pakatan Harapan (BERSATU)	Perikatan Nasional (BERSATU)
P058	(Perak) Bagan Serai	Azmi Ghazali	Barisan Nasional (UMNO)	Pakatan Harapan (BERSATU)	Perikatan Nasional (BERSATU)
P059	(Perak) Bukit Gantang	Syed Abu Hussin Hafiz	Barisan Nasional (UMNO)	Independent	Perikatan Nasional (BERSATU)
P063	(Perak) Tambun	Ahmad Faizal Azumu	Pakatan Harapan (BERSATU)	Pakatan Harapan (BERSATU)	Perikatan Nasional (BERSATU)
P082	(Pahang) Indera Mahkota	Saifuddin Abdullah	Pakatan Harapan (PKR)	Pakatan Harapan (PKR)	Perikatan Nasional (BERSATU)
P086	(Pahang) Maran	Ismail Muttalib	Barisan Nasional (UMNO)	Barisan Nasional (UMNO)	Perikatan Nasional (PAS)
P092	(Selangor) Sabak Bernam	Fasiah Fakeh	Barisan Nasional (UMNO)	Pakatan Harapan (BERSATU)	Perikatan Nasional (BERSATU)
P093	(Selangor) Sungai Besar	Muslimin Yahaya	Pakatan Harapan (BERSATU)	Pakatan Harapan (BERSATU)	Perikatan Nasional (BERSATU)
P095	(Selangor) Tanjong Karang	Noh Omar	Barisan Nasional (UMNO)	Barisan Nasional (UMNO)	Perikatan Nasional (PAS)
P098	(Selangor) Gombak	Azmin Ali	Pakatan Harapan (PKR)	Pakatan Harapan (PKR)	Perikatan Nasional (BERSATU)
P099	(Selangor) Ampang	Zuraida Kamaruddin	Pakatan Harapan (PKR)	Pakatan Harapan (PKR)	PBM
P112	(Selangor) Kuala Langat	Xavier Jayakumar Arulanandam	Pakatan Harapan (PKR)	Pakatan Harapan (PKR)	PBM
P115	(Kuala Lumpur) Batu	P. Prabakaran	Independent	Pakatan Harapan (PKR)	Pakatan Harapan (PKR)
P119	(Kuala Lumpur) Titiwangsa	Rina Harun	Pakatan Harapan (BERSATU)	Pakatan Harapan (BERSATU)	Perikatan Nasional (BERSATU)
P124	(Kuala Lumpur) Bandar Tun Razak	Kamarudin Jaffar	Pakatan Harapan (PKR)	Pakatan Harapan (PKR)	Perikatan Nasional (BERSATU)
P129	(Negeri Sembilan) Kuala Pilah	Eddin Syazlee Shith	Pakatan Harapan (BERSATU)	Pakatan Harapan (BERSATU)	Perikatan Nasional (BERSATU)
P134	(Malacca) Masjid Tanah	Ermieyati Samsudin	Barisan Nasional (UMNO)	Pakatan Harapan (BERSATU)	Perikatan Nasional (BERSATU)
P135	(Malacca) Alor Gajah	Redzuan Yusof	Pakatan Harapan (BERSATU)	Pakatan Harapan (BERSATU)	Perikatan Nasional (BERSATU)
P140	(Johor) Segamat	Edmund Santhara	Pakatan Harapan (PKR)	Pakatan Harapan (PKR)	PBM
P143	(Johor) Pagoh	Muhyiddin Yassin	Pakatan Harapan (BERSATU)	Pakatan Harapan (BERSATU)	Perikatan Nasional (BERSATU)
P146	(Johor) Muar	Syed Saddiq Syed Abdul Rahman	Pakatan Harapan (BERSATU)	Pakatan Harapan (BERSATU)	MUDA
P149	(Johor) Sri Gading	Shahruddin Md Salleh	Pakatan Harapan (BERSATU)	Pakatan Harapan (BERSATU)	Gerakan Tanah Air (Pejuang)
P150	(Johor) Batu Pahat	Rashid Hasnon	Pakatan Harapan (PKR)	Pakatan Harapan (PKR)	Perikatan Nasional (BERSATU)
P151	(Johor) Simpang Renggam	Maszlee Malik	Pakatan Harapan (BERSATU)	Pakatan Harapan (BERSATU)	Pakatan Harapan (PKR)
P154	(Johor) Mersing	Abdul Latiff Ahmad	Barisan Nasional (UMNO)	Pakatan Harapan (BERSATU)	Perikatan Nasional (BERSATU)
P158	(Johor) Tebrau	Steven Choong Shiau Yoon	Pakatan Harapan (PKR)	Pakatan Harapan (PKR)	PBM
P166	Labuan	Rozman Isli	Barisan Nasional (UMNO)	Warisan	Warisan
P167	(Sabah) Kudat	Abdul Rahim Bakri	Barisan Nasional (UMNO)	Pakatan Harapan (BERSATU)	Gabungan Rakyat Sabah (Direct members)
P168	(Sabah) Kota Marudu	Maximus Ongkili	Barisan Nasional (PBS)	PBS	Gabungan Rakyat Sabah (PBS)
P170	(Sabah) Tuaran	Wilfred Madius Tangau	Barisan Nasional (UPKO)	UPKO	Pakatan Harapan (UPKO)
P177	(Sabah) Beaufort	Azizah Dun	Barisan Nasional (UMNO)	Pakatan Harapan (BERSATU)	Gabungan Rakyat Sabah (Direct members)
P178	(Sabah) Sipitang	Yamani Musa	Barisan Nasional (UMNO)	Pakatan Harapan (BERSATU)	Gabungan Rakyat Sabah (Direct members)
P179	(Sabah) Ranau	Jonathan Yasin	Pakatan Harapan (PKR)	Pakatan Harapan (PKR)	Gabungan Rakyat Sabah (Direct members)
P180	(Sabah) Keningau	Jeffrey Kitingan	STAR	STAR	Gabungan Rakyat Sabah (STAR)
P182	(Sabah) Pensiangan	Arthur Joseph Kurup	Barisan Nasional (PBRS)	PBRS	Barisan Nasional (PBRS)
P183	(Sabah) Beluran	Ronald Kiandee	Barisan Nasional (UMNO)	Pakatan Harapan (BERSATU)	Perikatan Nasional (BERSATU Sabah)
P184	(Sabah) Libaran	Zakaria Edris	Barisan Nasional (UMNO)	Pakatan Harapan (BERSATU)	Gabungan Rakyat Sabah (Direct members)
P188	(Sabah) Lahad Datu	Mohammadin Ketapi	Warisan	Warisan	PBM
P193	(Sarawak) Santubong	Wan Junaidi Tuanku Jaafar	Barisan Nasional (PBB)	Gabungan Parti Sarawak (PBB)	Gabungan Parti Sarawak (PBB)
P194	(Sarawak) Petra Jaya	Fadillah Yusof	Barisan Nasional (PBB)	Gabungan Parti Sarawak (PBB)	Gabungan Parti Sarawak (PBB)
P197	(Sarawak) Kota Samarahan	Rubiah Wang	Barisan Nasional (PBB)	Gabungan Parti Sarawak (PBB)	Gabungan Parti Sarawak (PBB)
P198	(Sarawak) Puncak Borneo	Willie Mongin	Pakatan Harapan (PKR)	Pakatan Harapan (PKR)	Gabungan Parti Sarawak (PBB)
P199	(Sarawak) Serian	Richard Riot Jaem	Barisan Nasional (SUPP)	Gabungan Parti Sarawak (SUPP)	Gabungan Parti Sarawak (SUPP)
P200	(Sarawak) Batang Sadong	Nancy Shukri	Barisan Nasional (PBB)	Gabungan Parti Sarawak (PBB)	Gabungan Parti Sarawak (PBB)
P201	(Sarawak) Batang Lupar	Rohani Abdul Karim	Barisan Nasional (PBB)	Gabungan Parti Sarawak (PBB)	Gabungan Parti Sarawak (PBB)
P202	(Sarawak) Sri Aman	Masir Kujat	Barisan Nasional (PRS)	PSB	Independent
P203	(Sarawak) Lubok Antu	Jugah Muyang	Independent	Pakatan Harapan (PKR)	Perikatan Nasional (BERSATU)
P204	(Sarawak) Betong	Robert Lawson Chuat Vincent Entering	Barisan Nasional (PBB)	Gabungan Parti Sarawak (PBB)	Gabungan Parti Sarawak (PBB)
P205	(Sarawak) Saratok	Ali Biju	Pakatan Harapan (PKR)	Pakatan Harapan (PKR)	Perikatan Nasional (BERSATU)
P206	(Sarawak) Tanjong Manis	Yusuf Abd. Wahab	Barisan Nasional (PBB)	Gabungan Parti Sarawak (PBB)	Gabungan Parti Sarawak (PBB)
P207	(Sarawak) Igan	Ahmad Johnie Zawawi	Barisan Nasional (PBB)	Gabungan Parti Sarawak (PBB)	Gabungan Parti Sarawak (PBB)
P209	(Sarawak) Julau	Larry Sng	Independent	Pakatan Harapan (PKR)	PBM
P210	(Sarawak) Kanowit	Aaron Ago Dagang	Barisan Nasional (PRS)	Gabungan Parti Sarawak (PRS)	Gabungan Parti Sarawak (PRS)
P213	(Sarawak) Mukah	Hanifah Hajar Taib	Barisan Nasional (PBB)	Gabungan Parti Sarawak (PBB)	Gabungan Parti Sarawak (PBB)
P214	(Sarawak) Selangau	Baru Bian	Pakatan Harapan (PKR)	Pakatan Harapan (PKR)	PSB
P215	(Sarawak) Kapit	Alexander Nanta Linggi	Barisan Nasional (PBB)	Gabungan Parti Sarawak (PBB)	Gabungan Parti Sarawak (PBB)
P216	(Sarawak) Hulu Rajang	Wilson Ugak Kumbong	Barisan Nasional (PRS)	Gabungan Parti Sarawak (PRS)	Gabungan Parti Sarawak (PRS)
P217	(Sarawak) Bintulu	Tiong King Sing	Barisan Nasional (PDP)	Gabungan Parti Sarawak (PDP)	Gabungan Parti Sarawak (PDP)
P218	(Sarawak) Sibuti	Lukanisman Awang Sauni	Barisan Nasional (PBB)	Gabungan Parti Sarawak (PBB)	Gabungan Parti Sarawak (PBB)
P220	(Sarawak) Baram	Anyi Ngau	Barisan Nasional (PDP)	Gabungan Parti Sarawak (PDP)	Gabungan Parti Sarawak (PDP)
P221	(Sarawak) Limbang	Hasbi Habibollah	Barisan Nasional (PBB)	Gabungan Parti Sarawak (PBB)	Gabungan Parti Sarawak (PBB)
P222	(Sarawak) Lawas	Henry Sum Agong	Barisan Nasional (PBB)	Gabungan Parti Sarawak (PBB)	Gabungan Parti Sarawak (PBB)

The Deputy Works Minister Shahruddin Md Salleh of BERSATU resigned from his ministerial position on 4 June, calling his decision to join the Perikatan Nasional government "incorrect" and adding that he should have considered his constituents who "voted for Pakatan Harapan" in 2018. On 19 July, his BERSATU membership was terminated because he issued a notice to change the position of his seat in the Dewan Rakyat from the government bloc to the opposition bloc.

On 5 June, Member of Parliament (MP) for Lubok Antu, Jugah Muyang resigned from the PKR, a component party of the Pakatan Harapan (PH) opposition coalition, and pledged support for the ruling Perikatan Nasional (PN) coalition. Therefore, the number of the Opposition MPs dropped from 109 to 108. The next day, Jugah and Independent MP, Syed Abu Husin Hafiz, MP for Bukit Gantang visited Seri Perdana, the official residence of the prime minister to hand over their support letters to Muhyiddin, with Syed joining BERSATU as well. Also present were BERSATU MPs Senior Minister for Economy and Minister of International Trade and Industry, Azmin Ali and Deputy Minister of Energy and Natural Resources Ali Biju. It was also reported that Jugah was convinced by Azmin to support the ruling PN coalition to empower its administration.

On 2 November 2020, Maszlee Malik left PEJUANG and became an independent in support for Pakatan Harapan. His decision to leave PEJUANG was based on factual findings through field studies and detailed surveys of the aspirations and wishes of the majority of the people. Later, he officially became a member of Parti Keadilan Rakyat (PKR) party.

On 30 October 2021, Mohammadin Ketapi left WARISAN and became an independent in support for GRS Later, he officially became a member of Malaysian United Indigenous Party (BERSATU) party on 26 November 2021.

On 8 January 2022, Larry Sng was elected president of PBM and Steven Choong became PBM senior vice-president.

On 14 March 2022, Khairuddin Razali left PAS. He declined to disclose the reasons for his stance, other than insisting that he would be an independent Member of Parliament. On 20 March 2022, Khairuddin was firm in his stand and insisted that he would not join UMNO following his recent exit from PAS.

On 30 March 2022, Masir Kujat quit PSB. He said the decision to leave PSB was made after holding discussions with grassroots supporters in his constituency as well as several other factors such as the country's political instability which affected the well-being of the people. He pledged his full support to the leadership of the then prime minister, Ismail Sabri Yaakob.

On 26 May 2022, Zuraida Kamaruddin quit BERSATU to join PBM. She met with Prime Minister Ismail Sabri Yaakob to discuss her resignation from the Cabinet and continued supporting Ismail's government, in line with PBM's stand.

On 7 August 2022, Willie Mongin left BERSATU and joined PBB.

On 1 November 2022, Jugah Muyang joined BERSATU.

On 3 November 2022, Che Abdullah Mat Nawi joined UMNO to compete in Tumpat Parliament. Earlier, Che Abdullah's nomination to compete in Tumpat Parliament was not approved by the PAS Shura Ulama Council. Khairuddin Aman Razali also joined UMNO to defend his parliamentary seat. Shahidan Kassim joined PAS after BN dropped him as a candidate. Ismail Muttalib defended his seat in the 15th general election under PN.

=== Federal level ===
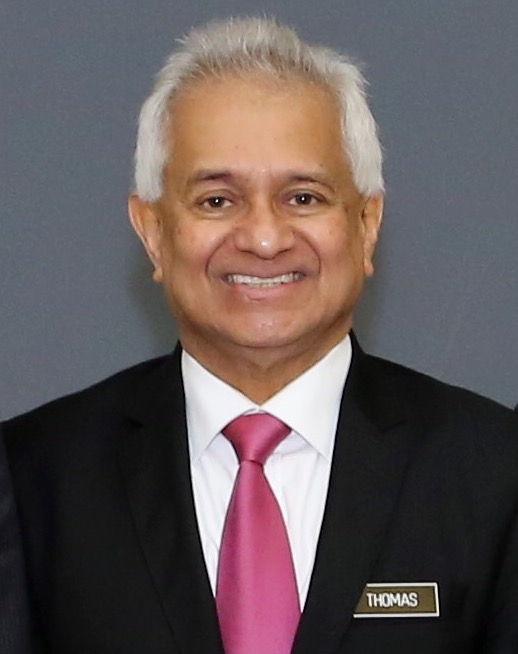
Tommy Thomas, the former Attorney General of Malaysia.

On 28 February, the Attorney General Tommy Thomas submitted his resignation letter to the interim Prime Minister Mahathir but no reason was given. It came after he was heavily criticised for his decision not to pursue a case against twelve Indian individuals including two state lawmakers who were accused of having connection with Liberation Tigers of Tamil Eelam (LTTE), which was listed as a terrorist organisation in Malaysia. He later told the media that he was a political appointee and as Mahathir resigned as the prime minister, it was best for him to tender his resignation as well.

On 2 March, the chief commissioner of the Malaysian Anti-Corruption Commission (MACC), Latheefa Koya tendered her resignation from the post. She stated that she wasn't pressured into doing so and that she wanted to return to her practice as a human rights advocate. The deputy chief commissioner of operations, Azam Baki, was appointed as the new chief commissioner on 9 March 2020.

=== State level ===
==== Selangor ====
List of seats that changed allegiance in Selangor
No.	Seat	Member	Previous Party	Previous Party (as of December 2021)	Current Party (as of August 2022)
N02	Sabak	Ahmad Mustain Othman	Pakatan Harapan (Amanah)	Pakatan Harapan (PKR)	Pakatan Harapan (PKR)
N07	Batang Kali	Harumaini Omar	Pakatan Harapan (BERSATU)	Pejuang	Gerakan Tanah Air (Pejuang)
N12	Jeram	Mohd Shaid Rosli	Pakatan Harapan (BERSATU)	Pejuang	Gerakan Tanah Air (Pejuang)
N13	Kuang	Sallehudin Amiruddin	Pakatan Harapan (BERSATU)	Pejuang	Gerakan Tanah Air (Pejuang)
N17	Gombak Setia	Hilman Idham	Pakatan Harapan (PKR)	Perikatan Nasional (BERSATU)	Perikatan Nasional (BERSATU)
N19	Bukit Antarabangsa	Azmin Ali	Pakatan Harapan (PKR)	Perikatan Nasional (BERSATU)	Perikatan Nasional (BERSATU)
N20	Lembah Jaya	Haniza Talha	Pakatan Harapan (PKR)	Perikatan Nasional (BERSATU)	PBM
N22	Teratai	Lai Wai Chong	Pakatan Harapan (DAP)	Independent	Warisan
N42	Meru	Mohd. Fakhrulrazi Mohd Mokhtar	Pakatan Harapan (Amanah)	Pakatan Harapan (PKR)	Pakatan Harapan (PKR)
N43	Sementa	Daroyah Alwi	Pakatan Harapan (PKR)	Perikatan Nasional (BERSATU)	PBM
N44	Selat Klang	Abdul Rashid	Pakatan Harapan (BERSATU)	Perikatan Nasional (BERSATU)	Perikatan Nasional (BERSATU)
N55	Dengkil	Adhif Abdullah	Pakatan Harapan (BERSATU)	Perikatan Nasional (BERSATU)	Perikatan Nasional (BERSATU)

The Menteri Besar of Selangor, Amirudin Shari called for a meeting with all Parti Keadilan Rakyat (PKR) members of the legislative assembly (ADUNs) at his official residence on the morning of 24 February 2020. Amirudin is a member of PKR and was recommended by Azmin Ali for the Menteri Besar post when he was listed as a minister in the Prime Minister's cabinet. He was generally regarded as a key lieutenant in Azmin's faction of the party.

On the morning of 25 February 2020, Amirudin sought an audience with the Sultan of Selangor, Sharafuddin of Selangor. He was also joined by Amanah's Selangor chairman, Izham Hashim and DAP's Selangor chairman, Gobind Singh Deo. The Sultan was satisfied with their explanation that the political development in federal level will not affect the incumbent Pakatan Harapan coalition in government of Selangor and consented for it to operate as usual.

On 5 March 2020, Amirudin announced a purge of BERSATU leaders and members from all positions of the state administration.

On 13 June 2020 Dr Daroyah Alwi, Deputy Speaker & EXCO, announced that she had quit the PKR party and became an independent assemblyman in support of the Perikatan Nasional coalition. She came out on the grounds that he had "lost confidence in the President (Anwar Ibrahim) and his harpist leadership of the idealism of the struggle". On 29 June, PKR Women's chief & EXCO, Hanizah Talha was sacked from PKR, stripping her from Selangor State Executive Council position. She has described PKR's decision to sack her from the party as an "act of revenge". Ahmad Mustain Othman, Sabak assemblyman, was sacked from Amanah on 28 July, for allegedly breaching party disciplinary rules.

On 8 August 2020, Jeram assemblyman announced his exit from PPBM. He said he will now be an independent who will back former PPBM chairman Dr Mahathir Mohamad. Shaid also claimed his exit will be followed by the majority of the PPBM Kuala Selangor division members, including various heads of branches.

On 16 November 2020, Meru assemblyman announced his exit from Amanah and join PKR. Sabak assemblyman also join PKR after being fired from Amanah.

On 8 January 2022, Daroyah Alwi and Hanizah Talha join PBM. Daroyah Alwi said she was attracted to join PBM because the party had a clear direction and goal of the struggle.

On 23 January 2022, Teratai assemblymen Lai Wai Chong join WARISAN.

==== Johor ====
List of seats that changed allegiance in Johor
No.	Seat	Member	Previous Party (GE14 Result)	Previous Party (before February 2020)	Current Party (as of 22 January 2022)	Current Party (as of October 2022)
N03	Pemanis	Chong Fat Full	Pakatan Harapan (PKR)	Pakatan Harapan (PKR)	Perikatan Nasional (BERSATU)	Perikatan Nasional (BERSATU)
N05	Tenang	Solihan Badri	Pakatan Harapan (BERSATU)	Pakatan Harapan (BERSATU)	Perikatan Nasional (BERSATU)	Perikatan Nasional (BERSATU)
N07	Bukit Kepong	Sahruddin Jamal	Pakatan Harapan (BERSATU)	Pakatan Harapan (BERSATU)	Perikatan Nasional (BERSATU)	Perikatan Nasional (BERSATU)
N08	Bukit Pasir	Najib Lep	PAS	PAS	Perikatan Nasional (PAS)	Barisan Nasional (UMNO)
N09	Gambir	Muhyiddin Yassin	Pakatan Harapan (BERSATU)	Pakatan Harapan (BERSATU)	Perikatan Nasional (BERSATU)	Perikatan Nasional (BERSATU)
N11	Serom	Faizul Amri Adnan	Pakatan Harapan (Amanah)	Pakatan Harapan (Amanah)	Pakatan Harapan (PKR)	Pakatan Harapan (PKR)
N24	Senggarang	Khairuddin A. Rahim	Pakatan Harapan (Amanah)	Pakatan Harapan (Amanah)	Pakatan Harapan (PKR)	Pakatan Harapan (PKR)
N29	Mahkota	Muhamad Said Jonit	Pakatan Harapan (Amanah)	Pakatan Harapan (Amanah)	Pakatan Harapan (PKR)	Pakatan Harapan (PKR)
N32	Endau	Alwiyah Talib	Barisan Nasional (UMNO)	Pakatan Harapan (BERSATU)	Perikatan Nasional (BERSATU)	Perikatan Nasional (BERSATU)
N36	Sedili	Rasman Ithnain	Barisan Nasional (UMNO)	Pakatan Harapan (BERSATU)	Perikatan Nasional (BERSATU)	Perikatan Nasional (BERSATU)
N37	Johor Lama	Rosleli Jahari	Barisan Nasional (UMNO)	Pakatan Harapan (BERSATU)	Perikatan Nasional (BERSATU)	Barisan Nasional (UMNO)
N41	Puteri Wangsa	Mazlan Bujang	Pakatan Harapan (BERSATU)	Pakatan Harapan (BERSATU)	Perikatan Nasional (BERSATU)	Independent
N43	Permas	Che Zakaria Mohd Salleh	Pakatan Harapan (BERSATU)	Pakatan Harapan (BERSATU)	Perikatan Nasional (BERSATU)	Pakatan Harapan (Amanah)
N44	Larkin	Izhar Ahmad	Pakatan Harapan (BERSATU)	Pakatan Harapan (BERSATU)	Perikatan Nasional (BERSATU)	Barisan Nasional (UMNO)
N47	Kempas	Osman Sapian	Pakatan Harapan (BERSATU)	Pakatan Harapan (BERSATU)	Perikatan Nasional (BERSATU)	Perikatan Nasional (BERSATU)
N50	Bukit Permai	Tosrin Jarvanthi	Pakatan Harapan (BERSATU)	Pakatan Harapan (BERSATU)	Perikatan Nasional (BERSATU)	Perikatan Nasional (BERSATU)

The Sultan of Johor, Ibrahim Ismail of Johor ordered all 56 members of the legislative assembly to meet him on 26 February. The assembly session that was scheduled to be held on 5 March was postponed as a result. All the assemblypersons were asked to sign SD to state their preference whether to form a new coalition government or to allow Pakatan Harapan to continue governing the state.

On 27 February 2020, the private secretary to the Sultan, Jaba Mohd Noah, announced that a new coalition will govern the state after gaining a simple majority of 28 assemblymen against 26 who supported Pakatan Harapan. Two assemblymen, BERSATU's Mazlan Bujang and Amanah's Salahuddin Ayub failed to state their preference as they did not meet the Sultan as ordered. The new coalition was slated to consist of MLAs from BERSATU, UMNO, MIC, PAS and several others whose party allegiance were not mentioned. However, a day later Pakatan Harapan challenged the new coalition's claim of majority control and stated that it too had the support of 28 assemblymen, including Salahuddin Ayub and PKR assemblyman Chong Fat Full who was rumoured to have been one of 28 assemblymen that signed a SD in support of the new coalition. The new Menteri Besar of Johor, Hasni Mohammad from UMNO, was sworn in on the evening of 28 February in front of the Sultan at Istana Bukit Serene, Johor Bahru. On 4 March, PKR assemblyman from Pemanis, Chong Fat Full formally announced his exit from his party to become a Perikatan-friendly independent, thus resulting in Perikatan Nasional effectively controlling 29 seats in the state assembly against Harapan's 27.

On 14 May 2020, the Johor state assembly convened. Sultan Ibrahim Ismail addressed the assembly and called on politicians not to create a "virus" of divisiveness and discord that would infect the rest of the country in the midst of the COVID-19 pandemic. The Sultan also reminded all assemblymen to set a good example by maintaining decorum and discipline, in contrast to the disruptions in the Perak and Malacca assemblies earlier in the week. Earlier, on 11 May, Johor Pakatan Harapan announced that they cancelled a no confidence motion in the Menteri Besar in response to the Sultan's plea, and Speaker Suhaizan Kayat of Amanah remained in his position amid earlier reports of his removal by the Perikatan government. On 3 June, following new reports of Pakatan Harapan plotting to retake control of the state government, Sultan Ibrahim threatened to dissolve the assembly and hold a new election.

On 28 August 2020, Chong Fat Full joins BERSATU.

On 4 September 2020, Osman Sapian BERSATU membership has been voided with immediate effect after he was spotted stumping for Pejuang during the 2020 Slim by-election campaign period. However at same time BERSATU Secretary-General Hamzah Zainudin says, Osman Sapian still remains a member of BERSATU. He said for now, Osman would only be called to answer charges regarding allegations of helping the Independent candidate campaign in the recent Slim State Assembly (DUN) by-election (PRK), and no action has yet been taken. He died on 21 December 2021 at the age of 69 from the complications of the stroke he suffer earlier.

On 27 February 2021, three Amanah assemblyman from Senggarang, Serom, and Mahkota joined PKR.

After Osman Sapian died on 21 December 2021, speculation arises about Johor state election should be held due to government seats only 28 left while Pakatan Harapan seats 27 in the state assembly.

On 18 January 2022, Pakatan Harapan rejects Johor state elections and bargains on 'Stability Commitment'

On 22 January 2022, Menteri Besar of Johor Hasni Mohammad said Johor will see the implementation of State Elections in the near future. Sultan Ibrahim Ismail agreed to sign the dissolution letter of the Johor State Assembly effective today to make way for the State Election, to be held.

On 23 January 2022, Johor state assembly Speaker Suhaizan Kayat of Amanah signing the Letter and Proclamation of the dissolution of the Johor state assembly.

On 27 January 2022, Mazlan Bujang announced that he resigned as Division Chairman of BERSATU of Tebrau and himself as well as 23 Tebrau BERSATU branch chairmen and action committee members decided to leave the party and throw their support behind Barisan Nasional (BN) and the leadership of Menteri Besar of Johor Hasni Mohammad with immediate effect to "give way to a more stable political environment and for the betterment of the Johor people in general". He also claimed that he would carry on to serve the people without a political position and failure of the two previous Menteris Besar from Pakatan Harapan (PH) to lead the Johor state administration and the failure of both parties to nominate a better Johor Menteri Besar candidate as well as he felt disrespected of his removal as Johor BERSATU Chairman and did not send any representative to the meetings he had chaired even though Muhyiddin had signed his promotion letter as the reasons as well. Muhyiddin then lashed out at Mazlan by asking where is his honour and sarcastically asked him to bring 200000 members to leave BERSATU as well.

On 29 January 2022, Larkin assemblyman Izhar Ahmad quit BERSATU. He said one of the main reasons he resigned was that he had lost confidence in party president Muhyiddin Yassin. He will no longer contest in the Larkin state constituency or in any other constituency, however, will join UMNO.

On 27 February 2022, Najib Lep's membership in PAS was automatically revoked following his contest as an independent candidate in the seat in the Johor State Election. PAS deputy president Tuan Ibrahim Tuan Man said Najib's decision was against the party's directives and decisions. Najib Lep said PAS's decision to transfer him to another seat seemed to want to kill his political career even after showing excellent service as the party's sole elected representative for the past four years.

On 6 March 2022, Johor Lama assemblyman Rosleli Jahari said that he has left BERSATU and will be requesting to rejoin UMNO. Rosleli, who was not selected as a candidate to defend his seat, said that he has lost confidence in BERSATU, its president Muhyiddin Yassin and his administration.

On 12 March 2022, Barisan Nasional won a two-thirds majority of 40 seats in the Johor State Legislative Assembly.

On 14 March 2022, Speculation had spread regarding the appointment of the new Johor Menteri Besar after Barisan Nasional was declared the winner of the state election. The speculation followed the call by Benut assemblyman, Hasni Mohammad for BN to choose young people to lead Johor, even though he was previously appointed as the party's Menteri Besar candidate. Rumors are rife that there are other names who have also been nominated as the new Menteri Besar of Johor. Among them are the names Onn Hafiz Ghazi and Dr. Mohd. Puad Zarkashi.

On 15 March 2022, Onn Hafiz Ghazi was sworn as Menteri Besar Johor in on the evening of 28 February in front of the Sultan at Istana Bukit Serene, Johor Bahru.

On 18 October 2022, Najib Lep joined UMNO.

==== Malacca ====
List of seats that changed allegiance in Malacca before state election 2021
No.	Seat	Member	Previous Party	Previous Party (as of January 2021)	Current Party (as of February 2023)
N06	Rembia	Jailani Khamis	Pakatan Harapan (PKR)	Barisan Nasional (UMNO)	Barisan Nasional (UMNO)
N11	Sungai Udang	Idris Haron	Barisan Nasional (UMNO)	Barisan Nasional (UMNO)	Pakatan Harapan (PKR)
N12	Pantai Kundor	Nor Azman Hassan	Barisan Nasional (UMNO)	Barisan Nasional (UMNO)	Pakatan Harapan (Amanah)
N13	Paya Rumput	Rafiq Naizmohideen	Pakatan Harapan (BERSATU)	Perikatan Nasional (BERSATU)	Barisan Nasional (UMNO)
N15	Pengkalan Batu	Norhizam Baktee	Pakatan Harapan (DAP)	Independent	Independent
N23	Telok Mas	Effendi Ahmad	Pakatan Harapan (BERSATU)	Perikatan Nasional (BERSATU)	Pakatan Harapan (Amanah)

In Malacca, the legislative assembly was caught in a deadlock as both Pakatan Harapan and the opposition Barisan Nasional held 13 seats each after BERSATU left the then-ruling coalition. The Chief Minister of Malacca, Adly Zahari met the Yang di-Pertua Negeri of Malacca, Mohd Khalil Yaakob on 26 February to brief him on the current political situation. On 27 February, the state government announced in a press conference that they will preserve the status quo and will continue to operate as usual. However, the assembly session that was scheduled to be held on 6 March was postponed.

On 2 March 2020, Barisan Nasional's Malacca state chairman, Abdul Raouf Yusof attended a meeting with the Yang di-Pertua Negeri. In a press conference held in the evening, he confirmed that Pakatan Harapan had lost their majority in the legislative assembly and Perikatan Nasional will form a new government. The new coalition government had the support of 17 state assemblymen. On the same day, Adly Zahari met with the Yang di-Pertua Negeri and suggested that the state assembly be dissolved and to trigger a state election in accordance with Article 7 (4) of the state constitution, but Adly's suggestion was rejected.

On 3 March 2020, Adly held a press conference, in which he stated that he did not resign from his post. However, he was informed that he was no longer chief minister and was dismissed on the previous evening. The new chief minister of Malacca, Sulaiman Md Ali from UMNO was sworn in on the evening of 9 March 2020.

On 11 May 2020, the state assembly convened and the Perikatan administration moved a motion of no confidence in Speaker Omar Jaafar of PKR, which led to heated verbal exchanges and insults between both sides of the assembly. Example included PN Independent MP Norhizam Hassan Baktee shouting "babi" ("pig") repetitively to DAP representative Low Chee Leong in response to the latter's "pengkhianat" ("traitor") remark. The Speaker adjourned the sitting. Later, the assembly reconvened with only Perikatan assemblymen and declared Ab Rauf Yusoh of UMNO as the new Speaker. The ousted speaker said Malacca Pakatan Harapan is contesting the legality of the new Speaker's appointment.

On 2 January 2021, Muhammad Jailani Khamis joined UMNO.

On 4 October 2021, Four Malacca assemblymen declared that they have lost confidence in Chief Minister Sulaiman Md Ali's leadership. The assemblymen are former Malacca Chief Minister Idris Haron, Nor Azman Hassan, Norhizam Hassan Baktee and Noor Effandi Ahmad. Idris said the move was due to a series of decisions not implemented by the state government, which he added portrayed Malacca as a 'flip flop' state. State UMNO Liaison Committee chairman Ab Rauf Yusoh said the membership of Idris Haron and Nor Azman Hassan in UMNO was automatically dropped after being involved in the movement to overthrow the existing Malacca State Government. UMNO president Ahmad Zahid Hamidi proposed that the Malacca State Assembly be dissolved to make way for state elections to be held. The state elections will also give the people of the state the opportunity to elect a new government in the future.

On 5 October 2021, Idris Haron says Pakatan Harapan (PH) leaders should have the opportunity to take over the Malacca state government. The former Chief Minister said there was no need for the state election to be held as the 15th general election would be held in a year and a half. He said he personally rejected UMNO's proposal to hold a State Election (PRN) to resolve the state's political crisis. He, however, left the issue to the discretion of the Yang Dipertua Negeri, Mohd Ali Rustam to decide whether the State Legislative Assembly should be dissolved or elect a new Chief Minister from among the PH leaders. On the same day Malacca Assembly speaker disclosed that Malacca Chief Minister, Sulaiman Md Ali, took steps to dissolve the State Legislative Assembly starting 4 October 2021, in an effort to resolve the political crisis in the state. The dissolution of the Melaka state assembly was made after Sulaiman lost the majority of support, following the actions of four state assemblymen from the government bloc, withdrawing support for his leadership yesterday. The decision to dissolve the state assembly was made after the proposal submitted by Sulaiman received the approval of the Yang di-Pertua Negeri, Mohd Ali Rustam. In a separate press conference, PN Malacca chief Rafiq Naizmohideen announced immediate loss of Noor Effandi Ahmad's membership in BERSATU. The declaration was made due to his apparent cooperation with PH by being together with PH in a previous press conference on 4 October.

On 18 October 2021, Idris Haron, Nor Azman Hassan, Norhizam Hassan Baktee and Noor Effandi Ahmad join PH.Idris Haron join PKR and Nor Azman Hassan join Amanah.

On 20 November 2021, Barisan Nasional won a simple majority of 21 seats in the Malacca State Legislative Assembly.

On 21 November 2021, Melaka DAP chairman Tey Kok Kiew resigns. He took responsibility for the DAP's defeat of half of the eight state assembly seats contested in the election and he also apologized for PH's failure to form a state government.

On 26 November 2021, Melaka Perikatan Nasional and BERSATU chairman Mohd Rafiq Naizamohideen resigns. He said the decision was made to allow new leadership in the state BERSATU and PN in preparation for the 15th general election.

On 28 November 2021, BERSATU deputy president Ahmad Faizal Azumu said two BERSATU assemblymen continue to support the Malacca state government.

On 19 May 2022, Noor Effandi Ahmad join Amanah.

On 30 October 2022, Rafiq quits BERSATU. He was upset over seat distribution for the 15th general election. On 16 February 2023, Rafiq rejoin UMNO.

==== Kedah ====
List of seats that changed allegiance in Kedah
No.	Seat	Member	Previous Party (GE14 Result)	Previous Party (before February 2020)	Current Party (as of October 2022)
N01	Ayer Hangat	Juhari Bulat	Pakatan Harapan (BERSATU)	Pakatan Harapan (BERSATU)	Perikatan Nasional (BERSATU)
N02	Kuah	Firdaus Ahmad	Pakatan Harapan (BERSATU)	Pakatan Harapan (BERSATU)	Perikatan Nasional (BERSATU)
N05	Bukit Kayu Hitam	Halimaton Shaadiah	Pakatan Harapan (BERSATU)	Pakatan Harapan (BERSATU)	Perikatan Nasional (BERSATU)
N06	Jitra	Mukhriz Mahathir	Pakatan Harapan (BERSATU)	Pakatan Harapan (BERSATU)	Gerakan Tanah Air (Pejuang)
N14	Alor Mengkudu	Phahrolrazi Mohd Zawawi	Pakatan Harapan (Amanah)	Pakatan Harapan (Amanah)	Independent
N15	Anak Bukit	Amiruddin Hamzah	Pakatan Harapan (BERSATU)	Pakatan Harapan (BERSATU)	Gerakan Tanah Air (Pejuang)
N21	Guar Chempedak	Abdul Rahman Ismail	Barisan Nasional (UMNO)	Pakatan Harapan (BERSATU)	Perikatan Nasional (BERSATU)
N29	Sidam	Robert Ling Kui Ee	Pakatan Harapan (PKR)	Pakatan Harapan (PKR)	Perikatan Nasional (BERSATU)
N34	Lunas	Azman Nasruddin	Pakatan Harapan (PKR)	Pakatan Harapan (PKR)	Perikatan Nasional (BERSATU)

In Kedah, the Menteri Besar of Kedah, Mukhriz Mahathir sought an audience with the Sultan of Kedah, Sallehuddin of Kedah on the morning of 27 February. Mukhriz is the fifth child of Mahathir Mohamad, and a member of BERSATU, which had exited the incumbent coalition Pakatan Harapan. The Sultan consented to allowing Mukhriz to continue as the Menteri Besar after 19 Pakatan Harapan lawmakers announced their support for him despite the political situation at the federal level.

On 12 May, two PKR assemblymen representing Sidam and Lunas left the party citing lack of confidence in Anwar and an alleged purge of grassroots members aligned towards Azmin as their reasons, to become independents friendly towards Perikatan Nasional. Later in the day, Kedah state opposition leader Muhammad Sanusi Md Nor announced the formation of a new government with the support of 23 state assemblymen including the two ex-PKR members and four of six BERSATU assemblymen previously aligned with Pakatan Harapan.

On 13 May, Mukhriz appeared in a press conference with his exco members from Pakatan Harapan and insisted that his administration was still intact. He insisted that he will remain in control until the Kedah palace notifies him, or with a no confidence vote in the state assembly. Two days later, Kedah's assemblymen from both Pakatan Harapan and Perikatan Nasional were granted audience with the Sultan to resolve the issue. On 17 May, Mukhriz resigned, conceding that he had lost the confidence of the assembly. Muhammad Sanusi Md Nor of PAS was sworn in as the new Menteri Besar on the evening.

On 6 September, Azman Nasrudin and Robert Ling Kui Ee joined BERSATU.

On 30 October 2022 Phahrolrazi Mohd Zawawi was sacked from AMANAH, the component party of PH opposition coalition, he became an independent Kedah MLA, disqualifying him from holding the position as State Leader of the Opposition of Kedah, he was replaced with Johari Abdul, the Gurun MLA from another component party of PH, the People's Justice Party (PKR).

==== Perak ====
List of seats that changed allegiance in Perak
No.	Seat	Member	Previous Party (GE14 Result)	Previous Party (before February 2020)	Previous Party (as of February 2021)	Previous Party (as of March 2021)	Current Party (as of November 2022)
N08	Titi Serong	Hasnul Zulkarnain	Pakatan Harapan (Amanah)	Pakatan Harapan (Amanah)	Perikatan Nasional (BERSATU)	Independent	Independent
N09	Kuala Krau	Abdul Yunus	Pakatan Harapan (PKR)	Pakatan Harapan (PKR)	Perikatan Nasional (BERSATU)	Perikatan Nasional (BERSATU)	Perikatan Nasional (BERSATU)
N30	Buntong	Sivasubramaniam Athinarayanan	Pakatan Harapan (DAP)	Pakatan Harapan (DAP)	Perikatan Nasional (Gerakan)	Perikatan Nasional (BERSATU)	Perikatan Nasional (BERSATU)
N33	Tronoh	Yong Choo Kiong	Pakatan Harapan (DAP)	Pakatan Harapan (DAP)	Independent	Perikatan Nasional (BERSATU)	PBM
N41	Malim Nawar	Leong Cheok Keng	Pakatan Harapan (DAP)	Pakatan Harapan (DAP)	Independent	Independent	Warisan
N43	Tulang Sekah	Nolee Ashilin	Barisan Nasional (UMNO)	Pakatan Harapan (BERSATU)	Perikatan Nasional (BERSATU)	Perikatan Nasional (BERSATU)	Perikatan Nasional (BERSATU)
N47	Chenderiang	Ahmad Faizal Azumu	Pakatan Harapan (BERSATU)	Pakatan Harapan (BERSATU)	Perikatan Nasional (BERSATU)	Perikatan Nasional (BERSATU)	Perikatan Nasional (BERSATU)
N49	Sungai Manik	Zainol Fadzi	Barisan Nasional (UMNO)	Pakatan Harapan (BERSATU)	Perikatan Nasional (BERSATU)	Perikatan Nasional (BERSATU)	Perikatan Nasional (BERSATU)

On 27 February 2020, an UMNO representative from the opposition had an audience with the Sultan of Perak, Nazrin Shah of Perak and later revealed that the Sultan stated that any coalition which can prove that they have at least 30 seats in the state assembly will be able to form a government. The incumbent Menteri Besar of Perak, BERSATU's Ahmad Faizal Azumu then hinted that there will be a new state government, and articulated his hope that he would continue as Menteri Besar under the new government. On 3 March 2020, he informed the media that he had been ordered to see the Sultan at Istana Iskandariah in the afternoon.

In a press conference held on 9 March 2020, Faizal confirmed that a new state government made up of twenty five assemblymen from UMNO, three from PAS and four from BERSATU was being formed. He tendered his resignation on the next day to formalise the dissolution of the Perak State Executive Council. He was subsequently reappointed as the Menteri Besar of Perak by the Sultan and was sworn in on the evening on 13 March 2020.

On 12 May 2020, speaker of the Perak state legislative assembly Ngeh Koo Ham announced in a speech to the assembly that he would be resigning as speaker after an attempt by Menteri Besar Faizal to launch a motion of no-confidence against him. During the speech, he stated that attempts to replace him as speaker should not be done through threats, referencing Faizal's attempted motion of-no confidence against him. State government assemblymen had previously tried to persuade Ngeh to vacate the position before the state assembly convened.

On 26 July 2020, Buntong assemblymen, Sivasubramaniam Athinarayanan announced joining Gerakan after being sacked from DAP, however he joined BERSATU last December, but his membership was only reported 5 March 2021. Perak Gerakan chairman, See Tean Seng, said his party was not informed about the matter, either by BERSATU or Sivasubramaniam.

On 29 July 2020, Hasnul Zulkarnain joined BERSATU because of Prime Minister Muhyiddin Yassin's beliefs. However, on 23 March 2021 he was sacked from BERSATU due to his actions in supporting Perak UMNO chairman Saarani Mohamad as Perak Menteri Besar.

On 4 December 2020, Faizal lost a confidence vote, ending his term as Menteri Besar of Perak

On 5 December 2020, Faizal resigned as Menteri Besar of Perak.

On 10 December 2020, the new Menteri Besar of Perak, Saarani Mohammad from UMNO, was sworn in during the morning.

On 18 January 2021, Leong Cheok Keng was sacked by party DAP.

On 5 March 2021, Sivasubramaniam Athinarayanan and Paul Yong Choo Kiong join BERSATU.

On 8 January 2022, Sivasubramaniam Athinarayanan, Paul Yong Choo Kiong, and Leong Cheok Keng join PBM. Cheok Keng said he chose PBM because this party is truly a multi-racial party and not like other parties that claim to be multi-racial but only dominated by certain races.

On 23 January 2022, Menteri Besar of Perak Saarani Mohamad said There is no need to dissolve the state assembly because the state government has strong support including from the Pakatan Harapan. He said therefore it was different from the political situation in Johor with the government having a slim majority.

On 28 September 2022, Sivasubramaniam Athinarayanan rejoin BERSATU.

On 3 November 2022, Leong Cheok Keng announced that he had quit PBM and will participate in the 2022 Perak state election under WARISAN.

==== Penang ====
List of seats that changed allegiance in Penang
No.	Seat	Member	Previous Party	Current Party (as of July 2020)
N02	Bertam	Khaliq Mehtab Mohd Ishaq	Pakatan Harapan (BERSATU)	Perikatan Nasional (BERSATU)
N10	Seberang Jaya	Afif Bahardin	Pakatan Harapan (PKR)	Perikatan Nasional (BERSATU)
N21	Sungai Acheh	Zulkifli Ibrahim	Pakatan Harapan (PKR)	Perikatan Nasional (BERSATU)
N40	Telok Bahang	Zolkifly Md. Lazim	Pakatan Harapan (BERSATU)	Perikatan Nasional (BERSATU)

On 4 March, Afif Bahardin from PKR resigned from his position in Penang State Executive Council. He stated that he was pressured by the party's state and central leadership to resign from his post. Afif is a known supporter of Azmin Ali while the latter was still the party's deputy president. PKR's Norlela Ariffin was appointed as the new state councillor and was sworn in on 12 March in front of the Yang Dipertua Negeri, Abdul Rahman Abbas.

On 23 May, two BERSATU state representatives withdrew their support for the Harapan government of Penang following their appointments by the federal government to the Penang Regional Development Authority (under the Rural Development Ministry) and MARA's investment arm Mara Corp Sdn Bhd's board of advisors. On 28 May, Chief Minister Chow Kon Yeow announced that the state government will table a motion at the next state legislative assembly sitting to compel the two BERSATU representatives, along with Afif who was suspended from PKR on 3 May, to vacate their seats. At that time, Penang is the only state in Malaysia that has legislation which prohibits switching of parties for elected representatives under Section 14A of the Penang Constitution. The law also allows the assembly to declare the seats vacant via a motion carried by a majority of the House if the representatives do not resign. However, it is a controversial law and had been previously ruled as unconstitutional by the Federal Court in 1992.

On 24 June, Afif announced his departure from PKR and joined forces with BERSATU. On 4 July, Zulkifli Ibrahim was sacked from PKR. He declared that he is joining Perikatan Nasional on the same day. He insisted that the PKR disciplinary committee should have summoned him for investigations before making any decisions.

==== Sabah ====
List of seats that changed allegiance in Sabah before state election 2020
No.	Seat	Member	Previous Party (GE14 Result)	Previous Party (before February 2020)	Current Party (as of February 2023)
N03	Pitas	Bolkiah Ismail	Barisan Nasional (UMNO)	Warisan	Independent
N04	Matunggong	Julita Mojungki	Barisan Nasional (PBS)	PBS	Gabungan Rakyat Sabah (PBS)
N05	Tandek	Anita Baranting	Barisan Nasional (PBS)	Warisan	Gabungan Rakyat Sabah (STAR)
N06	Tempasuk	Musbah Jamli	Barisan Nasional (UMNO)	Warisan	Independent
N07	Kadamaian	Ewon Benedick	Barisan Nasional (UPKO)	UPKO	Pakatan Harapan (UPKO)
N08	Usukan	Japlin Akim	Barisan Nasional (UMNO)	Pakatan Harapan (BERSATU)	Gabungan Rakyat Sabah (GAGASAN)
N09	Tamparuli	Jahid Jahim	Barisan Nasional (PBS)	PBS	Gabungan Rakyat Sabah (PBS)
N10	Sulaman	Hajiji Noor	Barisan Nasional (UMNO)	Pakatan Harapan (BERSATU)	Gabungan Rakyat Sabah (GAGASAN)
N11	Kiulu	Joniston Bangkuai	Barisan Nasional (PBS)	PBS	Gabungan Rakyat Sabah (PBS)
N13	Inanam	Kenny Chua Teck Ho	Pakatan Harapan (PKR)	Pakatan Harapan (PKR)	Gabungan Rakyat Sabah (STAR)
N21	Kawang	Ghulam Haidar Khan Bahadar	Barisan Nasional (UMNO)	Pakatan Harapan (BERSATU)	Gabungan Rakyat Sabah (GAGASAN)
N24	Membakut	Mohd. Arifin Mohd. Arifr	Barisan Nasional (UMNO)	Pakatan Harapan (BERSATU)	Gabungan Rakyat Sabah (GAGASAN)
N25	Klias	Isnin Aliasnih	Barisan Nasional (UMNO)	Pakatan Harapan (BERSATU)	Gabungan Rakyat Sabah (GAGASAN)
N26	Kuala Penyu	Limus Jury	Barisan Nasional (UPKO)	UPKO	Gabungan Rakyat Sabah (GAGASAN)
N27	Lumadan	Matbali Musah	Barisan Nasional (UMNO)	Pakatan Harapan (BERSATU)	Gabungan Rakyat Sabah (GAGASAN)
N29	Kundasang	Joachim Gunsalam	Barisan Nasional (PBS)	PBS	Gabungan Rakyat Sabah (PBS)
N30	Karanaan	Masidi Manjun	Barisan Nasional (UMNO)	Pakatan Harapan (BERSATU)	Gabungan Rakyat Sabah (GAGASAN)
N31	Paginatan	Abidin Madingkir	Barisan Nasional (UPKO)	UPKO	Gabungan Rakyat Sabah (STAR)
N32	Tambunan	Jeffrey Kitingan	STAR	STAR	Gabungan Rakyat Sabah (STAR)
N33	Bingkor	Robert Tawik	STAR	STAR	Gabungan Rakyat Sabah (STAR)
N36	Kemabong	Jamawi Ja'afar	Barisan Nasional (UMNO)	Warisan	Barisan Nasional (UMNO)
N37	Sook	Ellron Alfred Angin	Barisan Nasional (PBRS)	STAR	Gabungan Rakyat Sabah (STAR)
N38	Nabawan	Bobbey Ah Fang Suan	Barisan Nasional (UPKO)	Pakatan Harapan (BERSATU)	Gabungan Rakyat Sabah (GAGASAN)
N39	Sugut	James Ratib	Barisan Nasional (UMNO)	UPKO	Gabungan Rakyat Sabah (GAGASAN)
N40	Labuk	Abd. Rahman Kongkawang	Barisan Nasional (PBS)	Warisan	Independent
N47	Kuamut	Masiung Banah	Barisan Nasional (UPKO)	Warisan	Gabungan Rakyat Sabah (GAGASAN)
N48	Sukau	Saddi Abdu Rahman	Barisan Nasional (UMNO)	Warisan	Independent
N55	Balung	Osman Jamal	Barisan Nasional (UMNO)	Warisan	Independent
N56	Apas	Nizam Abu Bakar Titingan	Barisan Nasional (UMNO)	Pakatan Harapan (BERSATU)	Gabungan Rakyat Sabah (GAGASAN)
N59	Tanjong Batu	Hamisah Samat	Barisan Nasional (UMNO)	Warisan	Independent
N60	Sebatik	Abd. Muis Picho	Barisan Nasional (UMNO)	Warisan	Gabungan Rakyat Sabah (GAGASAN)
-	Nominated member	Ronnie Loh Ee Eng	Pakatan Harapan (DAP)	Pakatan Harapan (DAP)	Independent
-	Nominated member	Jafari Waliam	Pakatan Harapan (PKR)	Pakatan Harapan (PKR)	Gabungan Rakyat Sabah (GAGASAN)
-	Nominated Member	Wilfred Madius Tangau	Barisan Nasional (UPKO)	UPKO	Pakatan Harapan (UPKO)

On 15 June 2020, two UPKO assemblymen representing Kuala Penyu and Sugut left the party citing Sabah state government is not in line with the Federal Government and become independents friendly towards Perikatan Nasional.

On 29 July 2020, former Sabah Chief Minister, Musa Aman claimed to have a simple majority to form a new PN government in Sabah. In a special afternoon press conference, he said, the new Perikatan Nasional coalition involved several parties, namely UMNO, Parti Pribumi BERSATU Malaysia (BERSATU), Parti Solidariti Tanah Airku (STAR) and Parti BERSATU Sabah (PBS). He also said the Minister of Home Affairs, Hamzah Zainudin and the Political Secretary to the Prime Minister paid a courtesy call on the Yang di-Pertua Negeri of Sabah, Tun Juhar Mahiruddin in the morning. Speculation rose in recent weeks that changes will take place in the Sabah government.

On 30 July 2020, Sabah Chief Minister Shafie Apdal said Sabah governor Juhar Mahiruddin has consented to the dissolution of the state assembly, paving the way for a snap election in the state. This follows claims by former chief minister Musa Aman who said that he had the numbers needed to form a new state government. The announcement also followed talk that Musa was heading to the state palace to be sworn in as chief minister today. Musa said yesterday that he had received statutory declarations from a number of assemblymen from various parties confirming their support for a new alliance he was leading. A total of 73 seats will be up for contest following the addition of 13 new seats endorsed in Parliament last year. He said he could seek the governor's consent to dissolve the state assembly as he was still chief minister.

Nominated Sabah assemblyman Ronnie Loh Ee Eng was sacked from DAP for supporting the Perikatan Nasional (PN) attempt to topple the Warisan-led Sabah government. Inanam assemblyman & Sabah PKR Vice Chairman, Kenny Chua Teck Ho were sacked from PKR for backing Musa. On 31 July, 5 assemblymen representing Tanjong Batu, Balung, Pitas, Kuamut, & Sebatik was sacked from Warisan. Loretto Padua, Warisan Secretary General says "In this case they are considered to have joined forces with Musa Aman and conspired to overthrow the Warisan government." Paginatan assemblyman & UPKO Vice President, Abidin Madingkir was sacked from UPKO for allegedly being involved with former Sabah chief minister Musa Aman to take over the state government.

On 16 August 2020, James Ratib joined UMNO.

On 2 September 2020, Abd. Muis Picho joined BERSATU.

On 26 September 2020, Perikatan Nasional won a simple majority of 38 seats in the Sabah State Legislative Assembly, and replacing the Warisan-led Sabah government with the Perikatan Nasional-led Sabah government. The new chief minister of Sabah is Hajiji Noor of BERSATU.

List of seats that changed allegiance in Sabah after state election 2020
No.	Seat	Member	Previous Party	Current Party (as of February 2023)
N03	Pitas	Ruddy Awah	Independent	Gabungan Rakyat Sabah (GAGASAN)
N06	Bandau	Wetrom Bahanda	Gabungan Rakyat Sabah (BERSATU Sabah)	KDM
N08	Pintasan	Fairuz Renddan	Gabungan Rakyat Sabah (BERSATU Sabah)	Gabungan Rakyat Sabah (GAGASAN)
N09	Tempasuk	Mohd Arsad Bistari	Barisan Nasional (UMNO)	Gabungan Rakyat Sabah (GAGASAN)
N11	Kadamaian	Ewon Benedick	UPKO	Pakatan Harapan (UPKO)
N12	Sulaman	Hajiji Noor	Gabungan Rakyat Sabah (BERSATU Sabah)	Gabungan Rakyat Sabah (PGRS)
N13	Pantai Dalit	Jasnih Daya	Barisan Nasional (UMNO)	Gabungan Rakyat Sabah (GAGASAN)
N23	Petagas	Awang Ahmad Sah Awang Shaari	Warisan	Gabungan Rakyat Sabah (GAGASAN)
N27	Limbahau	Juil Nuatim	Warisan	Independent
N28	Kawang	Ghulam Haidar Khan Bahadar	Gabungan Rakyat Sabah (BERSATU Sabah)	Gabungan Rakyat Sabah (GAGASAN)
N31	Membakut	Mohd. Arifin Mohd. Arif	Gabungan Rakyat Sabah (BERSATU Sabah)	Gabungan Rakyat Sabah (GAGASAN)
N32	Kilas	Isnin Aliasnih	Gabungan Rakyat Sabah (BERSATU Sabah)	Gabungan Rakyat Sabah (GAGASAN)
N33	Kuala Penyu	Limus Jury	Gabungan Rakyat Sabah (BERSATU Sabah)	Gabungan Rakyat Sabah (GAGASAN)
N35	Sindumin	Yusof Yacob	Warisan	Gabungan Rakyat Sabah (GAGASAN)
N37	Karanaan	Masidi Manjun	Gabungan Rakyat Sabah (BERSATU Sabah)	Gabungan Rakyat Sabah (GAGASAN)
N42	Melalap	Peter Anthony	Warisan	KDM
N43	Kemabong	Rubin Balang	Gabungan Rakyat Sabah (BERSATU Sabah)	Gabungan Rakyat Sabah (GAGASAN)
N46	Nabawan	Abdul Ghani Mohamed Yassin	Gabungan Rakyat Sabah (BERSATU Sabah)	Gabungan Rakyat Sabah (GAGASAN)
N48	Sugut	James Ratib	Barisan Nasional (UMNO)	Gabungan Rakyat Sabah (GAGASAN)
N49	Labuk	Samad Jambri	Gabungan Rakyat Sabah (BERSATU Sabah)	Gabungan Rakyat Sabah (GAGASAN)
N54	Karamunting	George Hiew Vun Zin	Warisan	Gabungan Rakyat Sabah (GAGASAN)
N55	Elopura	Calvin Chong	Pakatan Harapan (DAP)	Warisan
N61	Segama	Mohammadin Ketapi	Warisan	Barisan Nasional (UMNO)
N67	Balung	Hamid Awang	Barisan Nasional (UMNO)	Gabungan Rakyat Sabah (GAGASAN)
N68	Apas	Nizam Abu Bakar Titingan	Gabungan Rakyat Sabah (BERSATU Sabah)	Gabungan Rakyat Sabah (GAGASAN)
N69	Sri Tanjong	Justin Wong	Pakatan Harapan (DAP)	Warisan
N70	Kukusan	Rina Jainal	Warisan	PHRS
N73	Sebatik	Hassan A. Gani Pg. Amir	Warisan	Gabungan Rakyat Sabah (GAGASAN)
-	Nominated member	Amisah Yassin	Gabungan Rakyat Sabah (BERSATU Sabah)	Gabungan Rakyat Sabah (GAGASAN)
-	Nominated member	Jafari Waliam	Gabungan Rakyat Sabah (BERSATU Sabah)	Gabungan Rakyat Sabah (GAGASAN)

On 25 February 2021, Sebatik assemblyman, Hassan A. Gani Pg. Amir exited Warisan. The reason he left is because the party is no longer prioritizing the well-being of the people and only focused on politics. On 6 April 2021, he joined BERSATU.

On 10 March 2021, Pitas assemblyman, Ruddy Awah joined BERSATU.

On 3 October 2021, Sindumin assemblyman, Yusof Yacob exited Warisan. Yusof, who is also WARISAN's Information Chief, decided to leave the party due to be disappointed with WARISAN's struggle which is losing direction.

On 30 October 2021, Mohammadin Ketapi left WARISAN and became independent in support for GRS. He officially became a member of Malaysian United Indigenous Party (BERSATU) party on 26 November 2021. However, on 28 June 2022, he left BERSATU and became independent again in support for BN and GRS ruling coalitions after joining it only seven months prior.

On 28 December 2021, Limbahau assemblyman Juil Nuatim and Melalap assemblyman Peter Anthony left WARISAN and would be forming a new local political party based in Sabah that would align with the ruling GRS coalition on 28 January 2022.

On 20 January 2022, Elopura assemblyman Calvin Chong and Sri Tanjong assemblyman Justin Wong left DAP but carry on aligning themselves with the PH opposition coalition.

On 26 March 2022, Elopura assemblyman Calvin Chong and Sri Tanjong assemblyman Justin Wong join Warisan.

On 22 May 2022, Yusof Yacob confirmed his return to UMNO.

On 5 June 2022, Kukusan MLA Rina Jainal left WARISAN and joined PHRS on the same day.

On 28 August 2022, Segama MLA and Lahad Datu MP Mohamaddin Ketapi joined PBM.

On 21 October 2022, State Assistant Minister to the Chief Minister and Bandau MLA Wetrom Bahanda left BERSATU and joined KDM on the same day.

On 10 December 2022, The leadership of BERSATU Sabah announced its exit from the party and will form a new local party. BERSATU Sabah Chairman Hajiji Noor said the “unanimous decision” by BERSATU Sabah leaders to leave the party is based on the premise that the status quo is “no longer tenable”.

On 21 February 2023, Yusof Yacob, along with other 8 MLAs support Hajiji. At the same time, Yusof Yacob, James Ratib, Jasnih Daya, Arshad Bistari, Hamid Awang, Mohammad Mohamarin, Ben Chong and Norazlinah joined PGRS.

On 27 February 2023, Awang Ahmad Sah Awang Shaari left WARISAN and joined GAGASAN.

On 4 March 2023, Karamunting MLA George Hiew Vun Zin left WARISAN for GAGASAN.

On 21 May 2023, Juil Nuatim resigned from KDM and support GRS.

==== Negeri Sembilan ====
On 10 July, Rahang assemblyman, Mary Josephine, announced that she is quitting DAP, as well as resigning from all her positions in the political party. She said the decision was made after she could no longer face the challenges and pressures from the state DAP leadership. She added that she would continue to support Pakatan Harapan as an independent politician. She had since retracted her decision and rejoined the party on 20 July.

On 5 September 2021, a group of 4 PKR assemblypersons and other 11 PKR members representing state PKR declared their loss of faith in Negeri Sembilan MB, Aminuddin Harun, in his capacity as Negeri Sembilan PKR chief. Among the reasons cited was "failure to strengthen the party" and the risk of losing the next general election.

==== Kelantan & Terengganu ====
List of seats that changed allegiance in Kelantan
No.	Seat	Member	Previous Party (GE14 Result)	Previous Party (before February 2020)	Current Party (as of Jan 2021)
N37	Air Lanas	Mustapa Mohamed	Barisan Nasional (UMNO)	Pakatan Harapan (BERSATU)	Perikatan Nasional (BERSATU)

On 18 September 2018, Mustapa Mohamed quit UMNO and become an independent Member of Parliament and state assembly. He said the decision was made as he felt that the party's current direction is no longer in line with the political principles he upheld. On 27 October 2018 he joined BERSATU. Mustapa said he joined the party as he is confident that BERSATU would be able to serve his constituents better.

Perikatan Nasional and Barisan Nasional secured every seat in the Kelantan State Legislative Assembly, leaving it without an opposition.

UMNO Terengganu state chief Ahmad Said has claimed that there was no cooperation between the party and the PAS led Terengganu government, be it through PN or Muafakat Nasional pact set up before the crisis

On 22 January 2022, UMNO Kelantan state chief Ahmad Jazlan Yaakub said he decided to no longer be with PAS Kelantan through Muafakat Nasional (MN). UMNO made the decision following PAS Kelantan which is still cooperating with BERSATU and still chose the party to face the 15th General Election 15. PAS Kelantan state chief and Menteri Besar of Kelantan Ahmad Yakob said PAS Kelantan hopes that the relationship with UMNO will continue.

==== Perlis ====
List of seats that changed allegiance in Perlis
No.	Seat	Member	Previous Party (GE14 Result)	Previous Party (before February 2020)	Current Party (as of May 2020)
N12	Tambun Tulang	Ismail Kassim	Barisan Nasional (UMNO)	Pakatan Harapan (BERSATU)	Barisan Nasional (UMNO)

In the 2018 election, Ismail Kassim was nominated as a candidate for Menteri Besar by Perlis BN after retaining his seat but when the plan did not go through, he decided to quit UMNO to become first Perlis independent state assemblyman. He later applied to join People's Justice Party (PKR) instead but the application was never reported to be approved. Ismail finally announced he had joined Malaysian United Indigenous Party (BERSATU) in August 2019. However, the then secretary-general of BERSATU, Marzuki Yahya denied his participation after Marzuki claimed that he had never received the party's participation form from the Tambun Tulang assemblyman. He rejoin UMNO on 16 May 2020 after his application to join UMNO approved.

==== Sarawak ====
List of seats that changed allegiance in Sarawak
No.	Seat	Member	Previous Party	Current Party (as of July 2020)
N09	Padungan	Wong King Wei	Pakatan Harapan (DAP)	Independent
N11	Batu Lintang	See Chee How	Pakatan Harapan (PKR)	PSB
N39	Krian	Ali Biju	Pakatan Harapan (PKR)	Perikatan Nasional (BERSATU)
N81	Ba'kelalan	Baru Bian	Pakatan Harapan (PKR)	PSB

On 14 April 2020, Batu Lintang assemblyman See Chee How was sacked from PKR, leaving PKR with no representation in Sarawak State Legislative Assembly. On 27 July, Padungan assemblyman and Sarawak DAP vice-chairman Wong King Wei has announced his resignation from DAP with immediate effect, saying he was disillusioned with its direction and management. He claimed the party has deviated from the aims, objectives and struggle of the earlier days when he joined in 2006. With the assemblyman's resignation, PH lost its status as largest opposition party. Wong Soon Koh from PSB took over as opposition leader on 9 November 2020.

With the entry of Ali Biju on 23 August 2020, BERSATU/Perikatan Nasional was for the first time represented in the Assembly.

On 21 December, Julau MP Larry Sng stepped down as Sarawak PKR chairman. His reason for stepping down was to let a Dayak leader take over the post and lead the party in the Sarawak state election which is due in June next year.

Membership changes in the 18th Assembly
Seat	Before		Change		After		
Seat	Member	Party	Type	Date	Date	Member	Party
Dudong	Tiong Thai King	BN	Change of party			Tiong Thai King	PSB
Bawang Assan	Wong Soon Koh	BN	Change of party			Wong Soon Koh	PSB
Opar	Ranum Anak Mina	BN	Change of party	11 August 2016		Ranum Anak Mina	PSB
Engkilili	Johnical Rayong Ngipa	BN	Change of party	12 August 2016		Johnical Rayong Ngipa	PSB
Mambong	Jerip Susil	BN	Change of party	13 August 2016		Jerip Susil	PSB
Serembu	Miro Simuh	BN	Party membership within coalition	16 August 2016		Miro Simuh	BN–PBB
Bukit Semuja	John Ilus	BN	Party membership within coalition	16 August 2016		John Ilus	BN–PBB
Bekenu	Rosey Yunus	BN	Party membership within coalition	16 August 2016		Rosey Yunus	BN–PBB
Mulu	Gerawat Jala	BN	Party membership within coalition	16 August 2016		Gerawat Jala	BN–PBB
Batu Danau	Paulus Gumbang	BN	Party membership within coalition	16 August 2016		Paulus Gumbang	BN–PBB
Tanjong Datu	Adenan Satem	BN–PBB	Death	11 January 2017		Vacant	
Tanjong Datu	Vacant		By-election	18 February 2017		Jamilah Anu	BN–PBB
All BN members		BN	Departure from coalition and formation of new coalition	12 June 2018		All BN members	GPS
Mambong	Jerip Susil	PSB	Change of party	11 July 2019	24 October 2019	Jerip Susil	GPS–PBB
Pujut	Ting Tiong Choon	PH–DAP	Disqualification	11 February 2020		Vacant	
Krian	Ali Biju	PH–PKR	Departure from party	24 February 2020		Ali Biju	Independent
Ba'kelalan	Baru Bian	PH–PKR	Departure from party	24 February 2020		Baru Bian	Independent
Krian	Ali Biju	Independent	Party membership	28 February 2020		Ali Biju	PN–BERSATU
Batu Lintang	See Chee How	PH-PKR	Expulsion from party	14 April 2020		See Chee How	Independent
Ba'kelalan	Baru Bian	Independent	Party membership	30 May 2020		Baru Bian	PSB
Batu Lintang	See Chee How	Independent	Party membership	30 May 2020		See Chee How	PSB
Padungan	Wong King Wei	PH–DAP	Quit party	26 July 2020		Wong King Wei	Independent
Baleh	James Jemut Masing	GPS–PRS	Death	31 October 2021		Vacant	

List of seats that changed allegiance in Sarawak after election 2021
No.	Seat	Member	Previous Party	Current Party (as of August 2022)
N11	Batu Lintang	See Chee How	PSB	Independent

On 14 August 2022, Batu Lintang assemblyman See Chee How resigned from PSB. On 16 August 2022, See Chee How hold a press conference. He explained that he had wanted to leave PSB for a long time. His decision was not related to the provisions of the law prohibiting elected representatives from changing parties as approved in Parliament recently. Whether he wants to establish a new party or join another party, Chee How said, that matter is not in his plans at the moment.

=== Political parties ===
While leaving the headquarters after a meeting on 1 March 2020, members who were associated with the former deputy president Azmin Ali, such as the vice-president Tian Chua and the former party's youth wing deputy chief Afif Bahardin, was harassed and assaulted by PKR supporters. Both were accused of being "traitors". Police later revealed that one arrest had been made in relation to the incident involving Chua, with at least two reports were lodged.

A large number of grassroots members of PKR have left the party since the political crisis started. Three PKR Kelantan branch leaders announced that they were leaving the party on 26 February after Azmin and Zuraida Kamaruddin, the party's vice president, were sacked from their positions and expelled. Around 2,000 members from the Pasir Puteh branch left the party on 28 February, stating that they were disappointed with the party's leadership. 536 members from the Kota Raja branch also left the party on 1 March, citing that they no longer believed in the party's direction. On 2 March, around 400 members of PKR in Perak also left the party, arguing that the party had lost its focus on nation building and was only focused on the transition of power to the party's president, Anwar Ibrahim. This was later followed by the exit of 500 members from the Arau and Padang Besar branches on 15 March. They too cited that they had lost confidence with the party's leadership under Anwar.

On 17 May, PKR Srikandi Keadilan Chief, Nurainie Haziqah Shafii, exits the party. The decision was taken after she has lost confidence on the direction of PKR at this time. On 21 June, a further 50 Johor PKR women leader members exit the party after losing faith in the party's top leadership. The next day, 25 PKR grassroots leaders of the Saratok branch exit the party citing loss of confidence in the party as their reasons. On 27 June, 19 Jelebu branch PKR Committee members exit the party after claiming to have lost faith in the PKR leadership.

On 1 July, Terengganu PKR women chef, Sharifah Norhayati Syed Omar Alyahya exit PKR along with 131 other members. The decision was made after seeing injustice in the party's top leadership. On 11 July, almost 100 Anak Muda Keadilan (AMK) Port Dickson members exit PKR, paralyzing the AMK branch of Port Dickson. The action was taken as they believe the party was weakening and is unable to win seats in the next general election. On 15 July, Jempol PKR branch chief, Karip Mohd Salleh along with 25 other members exit party resulting in the dissolution of the branch is. The decision was made after each of them had lost faith in the party leadership in navigating the leadership ranks either at the federal or state levels. On 25 July 721 members of Parti Keadilan Rakyat (PKR) Tebrau Branch exit party after claiming to have lost faith in the party leadership.

=== Economy ===
Following the resignation of Mahathir Mohamad, Malaysia's stock market FTSE Bursa Malaysia KLCI on 24 February dropped to its lowest point since 2011. The Ringgit also weakened against US dollar, traded at 4.22, their lowest in months. However, the market bounced back on the next day, trading at 0.78% higher on mid-day.

The ringgit fell to a one-year low at the news of Muhyiddin Yassin's resignation, and the stock market slipped.

=== COVID-19 pandemic ===
Following significant increases in COVID-19 cases in the country originating from the Tablighi Jamaat gathering at "Masjid Jamek Sri Petaling" in Kuala Lumpur, attention has been directed at the failure of the leadership of the country preventing such large gatherings from being held and containing the spread of the cluster case.

Until 24 February, Malaysia was under a Pakatan Harapan (PH) government, which Ministry of Health under Dzulkefly Ahmad had collaborated with Director-General of Health Noor Hisham Abdullah to prepare for the intake of COVID-19 patients, and had overseen the first month of the outbreak since 25 January with low volumes of cases, primarily imported. The Tabligh gathering, held from 27 February to 1 March, occurred within a week after the start of a major political crisis, which saw the collapse of the PH government on 24 February as a result of the defection of the Malaysian United Indigenous Party (PPBM) from the PH coalition, and an absence of a government until the formation of an unelected Perikatan Nasional (PN) government comprising a coalition of Opposition parties on 29 February. The Health Ministry would not have a minister for over two weeks until the appointment of Adham Baba on 10 March, just as spikes in cases began to be reported.

Adham would later use the Tabligh cluster incident to attack the previous PH government. In a 18 April 2020 livestreamed video conference call with Ahmad Zahid Hamidi, President of United Malays National Organisation (UMNO) (a major component party in the PN government), Adham would accuse PH of failing to prevent the spread of the Tabligh cluster despite the absence of a functional government during the period, while erroneously referring to the gathering as having taken place for longer, between 27 February and 3 March, and claiming to have attended a World Health Organization (WHO) conference call with "500 countries" (which Adham later clarified to refer to "500 participants from all around the world"). Responding to Adham's accusation, Dzulkefly would rebuke Adham's politicisation of the health crisis, claimed that preparations have been made since December 2019, and suggested that prior knowledge of the gathering would more likely be known to the Minister of Home Affairs of the previous PH government, Muhyiddin Yassin, who at the time of the political crisis spearheaded a defection of PPBM from PH and has subsequently been appointed as the current Prime Minister for the PN government.

=== Monarchy ===
Media outlets have noted the considerable involvement of Abdullah of Pahang in the political crisis. The Monarchies of Malaysia generally have minimal involvement in the country's politics, and some commentary suggesting it may pave the way for Abdullah, or monarchy itself, to have greater political influence in future. The Guardian described Abdullah's appointment of Muhyiddin, overturning of the 2018 election result, in March 2020 as a "royal coup".

== See also ==
- Impact of the COVID-19 pandemic on politics in Malaysia
- 2025 Perlis political crisis
- 2026 Negeri Sembilan constitutional and political crisis
- 2023 Sabah political crisis
- 2021 Malaysian state of emergency
- 2009 Perak constitutional crisis
- 1987 Ming Court Affair
