= Gailan Ramiz =

Iraqi politician

Gailan Mahmoud Ramiz
- Born: 1 January 1933; Iraq
- Died: 26 April 2004 (aged 71); Baghdad, Iraq
- Occupation: Politician

Gailan Mahmoud Ramiz (1 January 1933 – 26 April 2004) was a prominent political scientist and politician from Iraq. He served as Iraqi ambassador in the UN and he is one of the few academicians to hold degrees from Harvard, Princeton and Oxford universities.

== Biography ==
He was born in Baghdad, Iraq, in the family of an Ottoman army officer, who served as a member of Baghdad parliament. He died in 2004 in a bomb explosion in Baghdad.

== Education ==
Gailan Ramiz was sent to school in Egypt, becoming part of the first generation of Iraqis to be educated abroad. In 1958 he received a Bachelor's degree in law at Princeton. He later received an MA from Harvard, and in 1973 a DPhil from Oxford.

== Professional career ==
In 1980 he was elected as the Chairman of the UN Special Committee on Enhancing the Effectiveness of the Principle of Non-Use of Force in International Relations. He taught political science at universities in Jordan, Malaysia and Iraq.

From 1993 to 2000, he was professor of international politics and diplomacy at IIUM.

Before his death in 2004 he served as professor of international relations at Baghdad University.

He was a regular commentator in the international media during the Iraqi war. His book "The political process and the future of the Muslim world" was published in Malaysia in 2000.
