= Shamrahayu A. Aziz =

Malaysian constitutional expert

Yang Berbahagia Profesor Datuk Dr. Shamrahayu A. Aziz PMW
- شمرحايو عبد العزيز
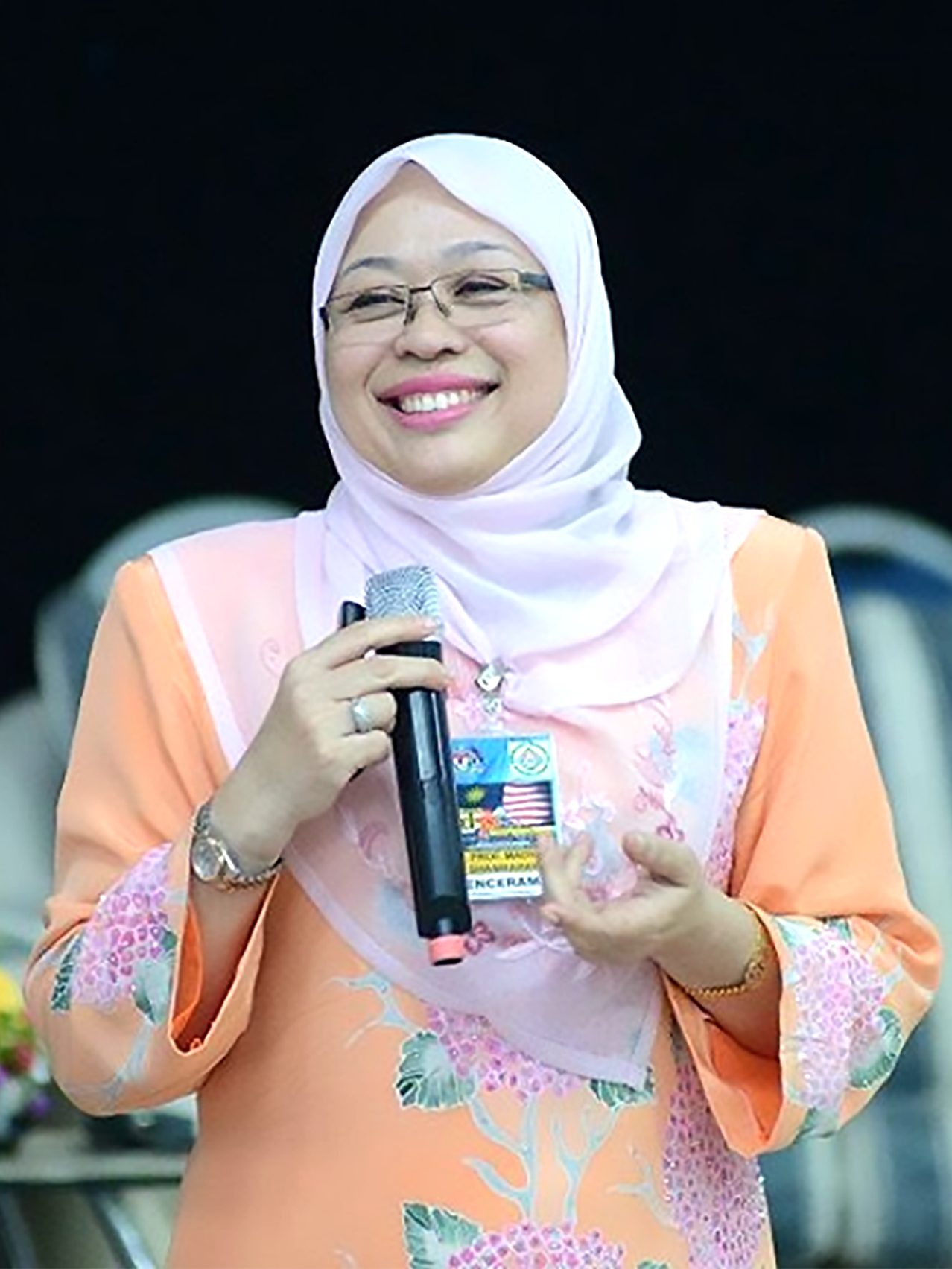
- Born: Shamrahayu binti A. Aziz; 5 June 1968 (age 58); Kelantan, Malaysia
- Education: Bachelor of Law(Hons.) - LL.B; Bachelor of Law Shariah (Hons.) LL.B_S; Master of Comparative Laws (MCL); Diploma in Shariah Legal Practice (DSLP); Doctor of Philosophy (Ph.D) in Law
- Alma mater: International Islamic University of Malaysia
- Occupation: Lecturer
- Notable work: Islam dalam Perlembagaan Persekutuan (2018); Issues in the Enforcement of Islamic Criminal Law in Malaysia (2011); Criminal Procedure in Syariah Courts (2011)
- Website: https://drshamrahayu.com

Shamrahayu binti A. Aziz (Jawi: شمرحايو بنت عبد العزيز; born 5 June 1968) is a law lecturer at the Ahmad Ibrahim Kulliyyah of Laws (AIKOL), International Islamic University of Malaysia (IIUM), Malaysia, and the incumbent Institution of the Malay Rulers Chair at Universiti Teknologi Mara (UiTM). She writes weekly as a columnist on the Malay daily newspaper, Berita Harian, as well as on her website. She does many research regarding Malaysian national affairs, the Malaysian Federal Constitution, Sharia law, and human rights. She is also a Principal Fellow at the Institute of Islamic Understanding Malaysia (IKIM).

== Personal life ==
Shamrahayu was born on 5 June 1968 in the state of Kelantan, Malaysia. At the age of 23, she resumed her studies at the International Islamic University of Malaysia in civil law and Sharia law. She later took a master's degree in comparative laws (MCL) at the same university in 1993.

In 1995, she began working as a lecturer at the Ahmad Ibrahim Kulliyyah of Laws, International Islamic University of Malaysia, where she began doing a lot of research and academic works regarding civic affairs, writing about the relation of etiquette and ethnics as well as civilisation.

She later got her Diploma in Shariah Legal Practise (DSLP) at the International Islamic University of Malaysia in 2001, and later received her Doctor of Philosophy (Ph.D.) in Law six years later.

== Career ==
Shamrahayu began working at the International Islamic University of Malaysia as a lecturer in 1995. She wrote many writings published in law journals, books, as well as newspapers and other types of media, where as of the year 2020, she has written over 500 articles and presented over 100 papers.

Among the books in which she wrote includes Islam dalam Perlembagaan Persekutuan (2018), Isu-Isu dalam Penguatkuasaan Undang-Undang Jenayah Islam (2016), Issues in the Enforcement of Islamic Criminal Law in Malaysia (2011), Polemik dalam Pindaan Bidang Kuasa Mahkamah Syariah (2016) and Criminal Procedure in Syariah Courts (2011). She also contributed to the writing of the book Kontrak Sosial: Perlembagaan Persekutuan Pengikat Jatidiri Bangsa Malaysia Merdeka (2014) that talks about the institution of the Federal Constitution of Malaysia, and has also edited three books including a compilation of the writings of the former Chief Justice of Malaysia, Tun Abdul Hamid Mohamad.

She's also a member of the National Shariah Law Technical Committee at the Prime Minister's Department in 2014.

=== Executive summary regarding Rome Statute for the Council of Rulers ===
On 2 April 2019, Shamrahayu, along with three other academicians, Universiti Teknologi Mara law professor Datuk Dr. Rahmat Mohamad and two Universiti Sains Islam Malaysia law lecturers Dr. Fareed Mohd Hassan, and Hisham Hanapi sought for audience with the Council of Rulers to present an executive summary regarding the Rome Statute of the International Criminal Court.

The research and presentation were both done confidentially, but was exposed by nine university students who condemned the move done by the four academicians to advise the Malay Rulers as Malaysia under the Pakatan Harapan government was in the motion to sign the controversial treaty.

Among the contents of the presentation included the explanation of the position of the Malay Rulers, especially the Yang di-Pertuan Agong or King of Malaysia, and their role and positions as heads of the states and the supreme head of the federation respectively which shall be affected upon the signing of the Rome Statute. When the treaty is signed, the agreement has to be taken without any exclusion or reservations, which would open to tainting the sovereignty of the Yang di-Pertuan Agong as the Commander-in-Chief of the Malaysian Armed Forces, by allowing him to be brought to the International Criminal Court.

The four academicians were mostly condemned by the government, including Port Dickson Member of Parliament and Parti Keadilan Rakyat (PKR) President, Dato' Seri Anwar Ibrahim who described the research and summary as a biased one. Deputy Minister of Education, Teo Nie Ching informed that the ministry shall discuss on the action to be taken against these four academicians, however, no action was taken after public condemnation.

On the following Saturday, Prime Minister Mahathir Mohamad informed that Malaysia has pulled away from signing the treaty.

== Honours ==
- Federal Territory (Malaysia)
  - Commander of the Order of the Territorial Crown (PMW) – Datuk (2021)

== See also ==
- Rome Statute of the International Criminal Court
