= Human rights in Muslim-majority countries =

Human rights in Muslim-majority countries have been a subject of controversy for many decades. International non-governmental organizations (INGOs) such as Amnesty International (AI), Human Rights Watch (HRW), and Freedom House (FH) consistently find human rights violations in Muslim-majority countries. Amongst the human rights issues that are frequently under the spotlight are LGBT rights, Workers' rights, the right to consensual sex outside of marriage, freedom of speech and political opinion. The issue of women's rights is also the subject of fierce debate.

When the United Nations adopted the Universal Declaration of Human Rights (UDHR) in 1948, Saudi Arabia refused to sign it as they were of the view that sharia law had already set out the rights of men and women, and that to sign the UDHR would be unnecessary. The adoption of the UDHR started a debate on human rights in the Islamic world. Following years of deliberation, the Organisation of the Islamic Conference (OIC) adopted the Cairo Declaration of Human Rights in Islam.

== Cairo Declaration of Human Rights in Islam ==
The CDHR was signed by member states of the OIC in 1990 at the 19th Conference of Foreign Ministers held in Cairo, Egypt. It was seen as the answer to the UDHR. In fact, the CDHR was "patterned after the UN-sponsored UDHR of 1948". The object of the CDHR was to "serve as a guide for member states on human rights issues." CDHR translated the Qur'anic teachings as follows: "All men are equal in terms of basic human dignity and basic obligations and responsibilities, without any discrimination on the basis of race, colour, language, belief, sex, religion, political affiliation, social status or other considerations. True religion is the guarantee for enhancing such dignity along the path to human integrity." On top of references to the Qur'an, the CDHR also referenced prophetic teachings and Islamic legal tradition.

While the CDHR can be seen as a significant human rights milestone for Muslim-majority countries, Western commentators have been critical of it. For one, it is a heavily qualified document. The CDHR is pre-empted by shariah law – "all rights and freedoms stipulated [in the Cairo Declaration] are subject to Islamic Shari'ah." In turn, though member countries appear to follow shariah law, these laws seem to be ignored altogether when it comes to "[repressing] their citizens using torture, and imprisonment without trial and disappearance." Abdullah al-Ahsan describes this as the Machiavellian attempt which is "turning out to be catastrophic in the Muslim world."

== Individual countries ==
=== Bahrain ===
The Kingdom of Bahrain has been addressed by the European Union regarding its human rights records several times in the past. After the last dialogue between EU and Bahrain held on 7 November 2019, the EU Special Representative for Human Rights conducted an early 2021 dialogue with Bahrain raising the issue of prison torture, repression of freedom of expression and association, and arbitrary detentions of Hassan Mushaima, Abdulhadi al-Khawaja, and Abduljalil al-Singace. The EU aimed at reversing the stated issues in early 2021 scheduled human rights dialogue with Bahrain.

=== Saudi Arabia ===
Saudi Arabia has been under the human rights spotlight for a number of decades, receiving increased attention from the early 1990s onwards. Much of the period between the 1940s to 1980s was characterized by Saudi Arabia's perceived passivity on the issue as well as its refusal to sign the UDHR. The period thereafter has seen a significant uptake on the matter. It all began with Saudi Arabia's handling of the Second Gulf War in 1991, which created much unhappiness and opposition amongst its citizens. Thereafter, a group of Saudi Arabian citizens attempted to establish a non-governmental human rights organization called the Committee for the Defence of Legitimate Rights ("CDLR"). Within weeks of its formation, Saudi Arabian authorities arrested many of its members and supporters. Following the release of its main founder and president Almasari, the committee was reformed in London where it received attention from human rights organisations worldwide. CDLR's work shed much-needed light on the human rights situation in Saudi Arabia that was previously clouded in secrecy.

The events which have followed since the early 1990s such as the end of the Cold War, the Gulf War and the 9/11 terrorist attacks on the United States of America, have further impacted the issue of human rights in Saudi Arabia, more so than any other country. Since these events, Saudi Arabia has steadily opened itself up to scrutiny by international agencies; they have also participated and engaged the human rights front more actively. The country has allowed visits from UN Special Rapporteurs and Working Groups. Saudi Arabia has also joined international human rights legal agreements, which means that the country is legally subject to Convention on the Elimination of All Forms of Racial Discrimination (CERD), the Convention on the Elimination of All Forms of Discrimination against Women (CEDAW), the Convention against Torture and Other Cruel, Inhuman or Degrading Treatment or Punishment (CAT) and the Convention on the Rights of the Child (CRC).

While some have lauded the progress made, others have remained highly critical of the country. In a 2013-human rights review of Saudi Arabia by CountryWatch, it is said that Saudi Arabia has a "poor record of human rights" with the country's law "not [providing] for the protection of many basic rights". The report goes on to detail the many shortcomings in the country such as corruption, lack of transparency, the presence of corporal punishments and the lack of separation between the three branches of the government (i.e. judicial, executive and legislative).

By 2017, Saudi Arabian authorities had intensified their efforts in cracking down against human rights activists. Many activists, including one who provided information to Amnesty International, have been detained or appeared in court for their work, an indication that Saudi Arabian authorities plan to continue their crackdown on peaceful opposition. Human rights activists disappear, are prosecuted, jailed, or forced into exile.

=== Pakistan ===
The human rights situation in Pakistan is generally regarded as poor by domestic and international observers. Initially, the 1973 Constitution twice enjoins "adequate provision shall be made for minorities" in its preamble, and the Fourth Amendment (1975) guaranteed at least six seats in the National Assembly would be held by minorities to safeguard their "legitimate interests". However, the human rights record of Pakistan declined under the dictatorship of the US-supported General Zia. General Zia introduced Sharia Law which led to Islamization of the country. The current regime in Pakistan has been responsible for torture, extrajudicial executions and other human rights violations. Forced conversion and Honor killings are also common in Pakistan. Freedom House has assessed Pakistan as "Partly Free" with a relatively low score of 37/100, indicating that it does not qualify as a "free democracy." This classification is based on a range of factors, including the military's influence, incidents involving Islamist militants, and constraints imposed on civil liberties.

=== Turkey ===
Despite the genocide committed at the beginning of the 20th century against 3 million local Christians and the expulsion of the Greeks from the Greek cities that the Turks conquered such as Antalya and Istanbul, Turkey is considered by many as being the exemplary country of the Muslim world where a satisfactory compromise is made between the values of Islamic and Western civilizations. One of the main reasons cited for Turkey's significant improvement in its human rights efforts over the past few decades is the country's push towards satisfying European Union pre-conditions for membership. In 2000, AI, on the back of visits made to the country to observe human rights practices, found that Turkey was demonstrating signs of greater transparency compared to other Muslim countries. In 2002, an AI report stated that the Turkish parliament passed three laws "…aimed at bringing Turkish law into line with European human rights standards." The same report further noted that "AI was given permission to open a branch in Turkey under the Law on Associations."

Some of the latest human rights steps taken by Turkey include "the fourth judicial reform package adopted in April, which strengthens the protection of fundamental rights, including freedom of expression and the fight against impunity for cases of torture and ill-treatment; the peace process which aims to end terrorism and violence in the Southeast of the country and pave the way for a solution to the Kurdish issue; the September 2013 democratisation package which sets out further reform, covering important issues such as the use of languages other than Turkish, and minority rights."

Further progress was also recorded on the women's rights front where Turkey was the first country to ratify the Council of Europe Convention against Domestic Violence. Also, in 2009, the Turkish government established a Parliamentary Committee on Equal Opportunities for Men and Women to look at reducing the inequality between the sexes.

Despite all these advancements, there are still many significant human rights issues troubling the country. In a 2013-human rights report by the United States Department of State, amongst the problems to receive significant criticism were government interference with freedom of expression and assembly, lack of transparency and independence of the judiciary and inadequate protection of vulnerable populations. Human Rights Watch has even gone as far as to declare that there has been a "human rights rollback" in the country. According to the report, this has taken place amidst the mass anti-government protests which took place in 2013. Under the current leadership of Recep Tayyip Erdoğan, the ruling party has become increasingly intolerant of "political opposition, public protest, and critical media".

The recent rise in Islamization under Recep Tayyip Erdoğan regime was exemplified when in early July 2020, the Council of State annulled the Cabinet's 1934 decision to establish the museum, revoking the monument's status, and a subsequent decree by Turkish president Recep Tayyip Erdoğan ordered the reclassification of Hagia Sophia as a mosque.

=== Iran ===
The Islamic Republic of Iran has one of the worst human rights records of any country in the world. Amongst the most serious human rights issues plaguing the republic are "the government’s manipulation of the electoral process, which severely limited citizens’ right to change their government peacefully through free and fair elections; restrictions on civil liberties, including the freedoms of assembly, speech, and press; and disregard for the physical integrity of persons whom it arbitrarily and unlawfully detained, tortured, or killed."

In 2014, Human Rights Watch reported that despite changes to the penal code, the death penalty was still liberally meted resulting in one of the highest rates of executions in the world. On top of that, security authorities have been repressing free speech and dissent. Many opposition parties, labour unions and student groups were banned and scores of political prisoners were still locked up.

The country has generally closed itself off to outside interference. The government has refused the request of the United Nations to have Special Rapporteur-Ahmed Shaheed report on the human rights situation in the country though they did, however, announce that two UN experts would be allowed to visit in 2015.

=== Qatar ===
==== FIFA 2022 ====
The talk of human rights in Qatar has surged after people started questioning how ethical the building of the stadiums for FIFA 2022 was. Questioning the statistics of the number of deaths of the migrant workers that worked in the stadiums. The death tolls of the Labour workers connected to the stadiums surpassed any other of any country that had hosted and prepared for the World Cup, that number being 6,500. The WHO also mentioned that 1,500 deaths per year is the average for a population of 2 million people. However, Qatar initiated new working standards for workers, including protection from heat stress, where workers are prohibited to work outside if the temperature surpasses 32 degrees.

==== Migrant rights ====
Racism toward immigrants in Qatar is prevalent and is shown in multiple ways. One way it is shown is by prioritizing the locals in the workplace over immigrants. Some of the domestic workers have spoken out on the mistreatment they’ve been through working for some Qatari families. A few instances include how cruel the working conditions are, the abuse they suffered, ranging from sexual, verbal and physical.

==== Freedom of speech ====
Qatar's freedom of speech is very restrictive. Expressing negative views or threats on the Emir or the country can get an individual fined or imprisoned. Two men were sentenced to life in prison for threatening the Emir on social media. Another individual was fined 100,000 QR for spreading false news.

== See also ==
- Women in Islam
- Arab Charter on Human Rights
- History of human rights in the early Islamic Caliphate
- Human rights in the Middle East
- Human rights in the Qur'anic texts
- Abduction of Syrian children and the role of Western charity organizations
