= Green Gown Awards =

Sustainability awards for institutions of higher education

- Awarded for: Excellence in sustainability efforts
- Country: United Kingdom
- First award: 2004

Highlights
- Most awards: International Islamic University Malaysia (international)
- Website: www.greengownawards.org

The Green Gown Awards are awards given to acknowledge institutions of higher education such as colleges and universities on their exceptional efforts towards sustainability, under the purview of the Environmental Association of Universities and Colleges (EAUC), with support from the United Nations Environment Programme (UNEP). The awards are referred to as the "highest recognition given to higher education institutions that carry out sustainability efforts" in reaching the United Nations (UN)'s Sustainable Development Goals.

The original awards, now the Green Gown Awards UK & Ireland, were given to institutions in United Kingdom and Ireland. This was later expanded with the Green Gown Awards Australasia in 2010 and the International Green Gown Awards from 2014. Among the most sought-after category is the Sustainability Institution of the Year.

== Background ==
The first Green Gown Awards were awarded by EAUC in 2004 to institutions of higher education in United Kingdom and Ireland. These first awards were made in six categories - Energy Efficiency, Sustainable Construction, Transport, Sustainable Procurement, Waste Management, and Water Efficiency, with the categories changing and expanding in later years.

There are two levels of acknowledgement in the awards: Winner (awarded to best institution within a category) and Highly Commended (sometimes awarded as an honourable mention).

In 2010, the awards expanded beyond United Kingdom and Ireland. The original awards programme in those two countries was renamed Green Gown Awards UK & Ireland and another programme was created for the Australasian region, Green Gown Awards Australasia. The awards were later expanded to French-speaking countries in 2014, as Les trophées des campus responsables.

The awards were further expanded to the rest of the world with the introduction of the International Green Gown Awards in 2014, with the first such awards being won by RMIT University (Australia) for the category Continuous Improvement: Institutional Change, Hull College (UK) for Social Responsibility, and Manchester Metropolitan University (UK) for Student Engagement.

Since 2019, the award categories have included Sustainability Institution of the Year, awarded to institutions who sustained a whole-institution commitment and delivered impact towards sustainability while being a sustainable organisation as a whole.

The International Green Gown Awards have had separate winners in each category for small and large institutions since 2020.

== Winners ==
=== International Green Gown Awards ===
The United Kingdom is the country with the most awards, totalling 15 awards from 12 institutions. The individual institution with the most wins is International Islamic University Malaysia, Malaysia with six awards, including four awards in one year in 2024, making it also the only institution to win more than two awards in the same year.

==== 2014 ====
Category	Winners
Continuous Improvement: Institutional Change	(Australia) RMIT University
Social Responsibility	(United Kingdom) Hull College
Student Engagement	(United Kingdom) Manchester Metropolitan University

==== 2015 ====
Category	Winners
Community Innovation	(United Kingdom) De Montfort University
Continuous Improvement: Institutional Change	(Canada) Université Laval
Student Engagement	(United Kingdom) Edinburgh College

==== 2016 ====
Category	Winners
Continuous Improvement: Institutional Change	(United Kingdom) University of West of England
Community	Fiji National University
Student Engagement	(United Kingdom) University of West of England, UWE and University of Bristol

==== 2017-2018 ====
Category	Winners
Community	(Australia) University of Tasmania
Continuous Improvement: Institutional Change	(United Kingdom) Canterbury Christ Church University
Student Engagement	(Japan) Chiba University

==== 2019 ====
Category	Winners
Benefitting Society	(New Zealand) Victoria University of Wellington
Student Engagement	(Uganda) Ndejje University
Sustainability Institution of the Year	(Canada) McGill University

==== 2020 ====
Category	Winners	
Benefitting Society	(United Kingdom) Ayrshire College	(Peru) Universidad San Ignacio de Loyola
Student Engagement	(Brazil) Facens University	(United Kingdom) University of Strathclyde
Sustainability Institution of the Year	International Islamic University Malaysia	(Peru) Universidad San Ignacio de Loyola

==== 2021 ====
Category	Winners	
Benefitting Society	(Brazil) Facens University Center	(China) The Chinese University of Hong Kong^{[a]}
Creating Impact	(Chile) Universidad Tecnológica Metropolitana	(Finland) Lappeenranta-Lahti University of Technology
Next Generation Learning and Skills	(Nigeria) Covenant University	(United Kingdom) University of Gloucestershire
Student Engagement	(Switzerland) oikos St Gallen	
Sustainability Institution of the Year	(France) Polytech Montpellier	(United Kingdom) Keele University

==== 2022 ====
Category	Winners	
Climate Action 2030	(Japan) Chiba University of Commerce	(Hungary) University of Sopron
Benefitting Society	(Philippines) De La Salle Lipa	(Australia) Deakin University
Creating Impact	(Australia) University of Technology, Sydney	
Next Generation Learning and Skills	(Australia) University of Technology, Sydney	
Student Engagement	(Malaysia) UCSI University	(Australia) University of Tasmania
Sustainability Institution of the Year	(Canada) Dawson College	

==== 2023 ====
Category	Winners	
Climate Action 2030	(United Kingdom) Borders College	
Benefitting Society	(Brazil) Centro Universitário Facens	International Islamic University Malaysia
Creating Impact	(Peru) Universidad San Ignacio de Loyola	
Diversity, Equity, and Inclusion in Sustainability	(India) Kalinga Institute of Social Sciences	(United Kingdom) University of West of England, Bristol
Nature Positive	(Colombia) Universidad del Norte	
Next Generation Learning and Skills	(India) St.Teresa's College	(Peru) Universidad San Ignacio de Loyola
Student Engagement	(Pakistan) The University of Faisalabad	(New Zealand) University of Otago, Te Whare Wānanga o Ōtākou
Sustainability Institution of the Year	(Republic of Ireland) University College Cork	

==== 2024 ====
Category	Winners	
Climate Action 2030	(Thailand) Asian Institute of Technology	(United Kingdom) The University of Manchester
Benefitting Society	(India) Amrita Vishwa Vidyapeetham	(Thailand) Siam University
Creating Impact	International Islamic University Malaysia	(Netherlands) Vrije Universiteit Amsterdam
Diversity, Equity, and Inclusion in Sustainability	International Islamic University Malaysia	(Australia) The University of Sydney
Nature Positive	(Italy) Collegio Borromeo	(Ethiopia) Haramaya University
Next Generation Learning and Skills	(United Kingdom) Glasgow Kelvin College	Singapore Management University
Student Engagement	International Islamic University Malaysia	(Canada) McGill University
Sustainability Institution of the Year	International Islamic University Malaysia	Singapore Management University

== Footnotes ==
- ^a Although the Chinese University of Hong Kong is located in Hong Kong, the award specifically noted the recipient country as China, not Hong Kong.
