= Abdul Rashid Moten =

Bangladeshi political scientist, academic, and author

Abdul Rashid Moten (born 20 February 1947) is a Bangladeshi political scientist, academic, and author on issues ranging from political science and its various aspects, Islamic methodology in political science, political movements in the Muslim world, and good governance from the Islamic perspective. According to WorldCat, he is the author of 42 works in 81 publications in 3 languages. His book Political Science: An Islamic Perspective is held by nearly 300 libraries.

== Biography ==
After completing his B.A. and M.A. in political science from the University of Dhaka, Moten completed a second M.A., in political theory, from Villanova University in the U.S., and his Ph.D. from the University of Alberta in Canada.

Moten started his career in 1972 at Chittagong University, Bangladesh. In 1976, he joined the University of Alberta as a lecturer in the Department of Political Science, followed by Bayero University in the Department of Political Science (1978–92). He finally joined International Islamic University Malaysia (1992–present), where he later became a professor in the Department of Political Science.

Moten was the editor of the journal Intellectual Discourse from 2001 to 2008, and is presently the editor of the journal International Journal of Islamic Thoughts (IJITs).

== Publications ==
He has written and edited numerous books and published many academic articles. A list of books by the author includes:

- Moten, Abdul Rashid (1988). Islam and Revolution: Contribution of Sayyid Mawdudi. Kano: Bureau for Islamic Propagation. OCLC 20321470.
- Molla, Rafiqul Islam; ——; Gusau, S.; Gwandu, A. A., eds. (1988). Frontiers and Mechanics of Islamic Economics. Sokoto: University of Sokoto. OCLC 956990962.
- ——; Bajulaiye-Shasi, M. O. K., eds. (1990). Nature and Methodology of Islamic Economics. Kano: Bayero University. ISBN 9789782035004.
- Alkali, Nura; Adamu, Adamu; Yadudu, Awwal; ——; Salihi, Haruna, eds. (1993). Islam in Africa: Proceedings of the Islam in Africa Conference. Ibadan: Spectrum Books. ISBN 9789782461230.
- —— (1996). Political Science: An Islamic Perspective. Macmillan. ISBN 978-0-333-64311-2.
- —— (2002). Revolution to Revolution: Jamā'at-e-Islāmī in the Politics of Pakistan. Kuala Lumpur: Islamic Book Trust. ISBN 9789839154429.
- ——; Salam, El-Fatih A. Abdel (2005). Glossary of Political Science Terms: Islamic and Western. Singapore: Thomson Learning. ISBN 978-981-254-529-9.
- ——; Islam, Syed Serajul (2005). Introduction to Political Science. Singapore: Thomson Learning. ISBN 978-981-254-531-2.
- Islam, Syed Serajul; —— (2005). Political Science: A Primer. Singapore: Thomson Learning. ISBN 978-981-254-530-5.
- ——; Noraini, Mohd. Noor (2007). Terrorism Democracy: The West & The Muslim World. Singapore: Thomson Learning. ISBN 9789814227131.
- —— (2008). Government and Politics in Malaysia. Singapore: Cengage Learning. ISBN 9789814239271.
- —— (2009). Writing Research Proposals & Theses: Substance, Structure and Style. Malaysia: Prentice Hall. ISBN 9789814239271.
