= Kulliyyah of Architecture and Environmental Design =

Architecture school of International Islamic University Malaysia

The Kulliyyah of Architecture and Environmental Design (KAED) is the architecture or 'built environment' faculty of International Islamic University Malaysia (IIUM). Established on 1 June 1996 to fill the need for Islamic professionals in the built environment, it is the eleventh Kulliyyah built in the university, and the third science-based faculty after Kulliyyah of Medicine and Kulliyyah of Engineering. Its current dean is Prof. Dr. Mansor Ibrahim.

== Academics ==
KAED, as it is generally known by the students and staff (who are known as KAEDians), began its first student intake into the Foundation programme in the IIUM Centre for Foundation Studies in Petaling Jaya, Selangor. From the first batch that involved a mere 70 students, KAED has expanded to accommodate 1,100 students in its six departments:

- Architecture
- Urban and Regional Planning
- Landscape Architecture
- Quantity Surveying
- Applied Arts and Design
- Building Technology and Engineering

Of the six departments, five are currently active in offering courses to undergraduate and postgraduate students. Classes are held in English as it is the official language of the university.

The programs offered by KAED include Bachelor of Architecture (LAM / PAM Part 2) (B.ARCH), Bachelor of Urban and Regional Planning (B.URP), Bachelor of Landscape Architecture (B.LA), Bachelor of Quantity Surveying (B.QS), B.Sc in Architectural Studies (LAM / PAM Part 1) (BSc. ARCH) and Bachelor of Applied Arts and Design (B.AAD). The first five programs have received accreditation from the country's Accreditation Council.

Since its establishment till the present year, KAED has produced 23 Bachelor graduates, 253 architects, 80 urban planners, 77 landscape architects, and 74 quantity surveyors.

The Centre for Built Environment (CBE) was established before the creation of KAED as consultants to the disciplines of Architecture, Urban and Regional Planning, Landscape Architecture, Quantity Surveying, Applied Arts and Design and Building Technology and Engineering.

== Student life ==
Societies active within KAED include the Social and Welfare Club, the ARCHIMIC, and the Alumni.

ARCHIMIC is the KAED student entity in which subsocieties, e.g., [http://archais.wix.com/archais the [[Architecture]] students society Arch@is]], the Urban and Regional Planning student society PLANMIC, the Landscape Architecture student society ArcLa and the Quantity Surveying students society QUEST, are active participants.

== Awards ==
KAED has won many awards, even while in its 'young' stage. This includes champion of the Bridge Design Competition 2003, Best Garden Award in the Mines Flower Fest 2006 and third place in the International Orchid Festival 2006.
