= Osman Bakar =

Malaysian philosopher

Yang Berbahagia Datuk Osman Bakar PJN DIMP
- عثمان بكر
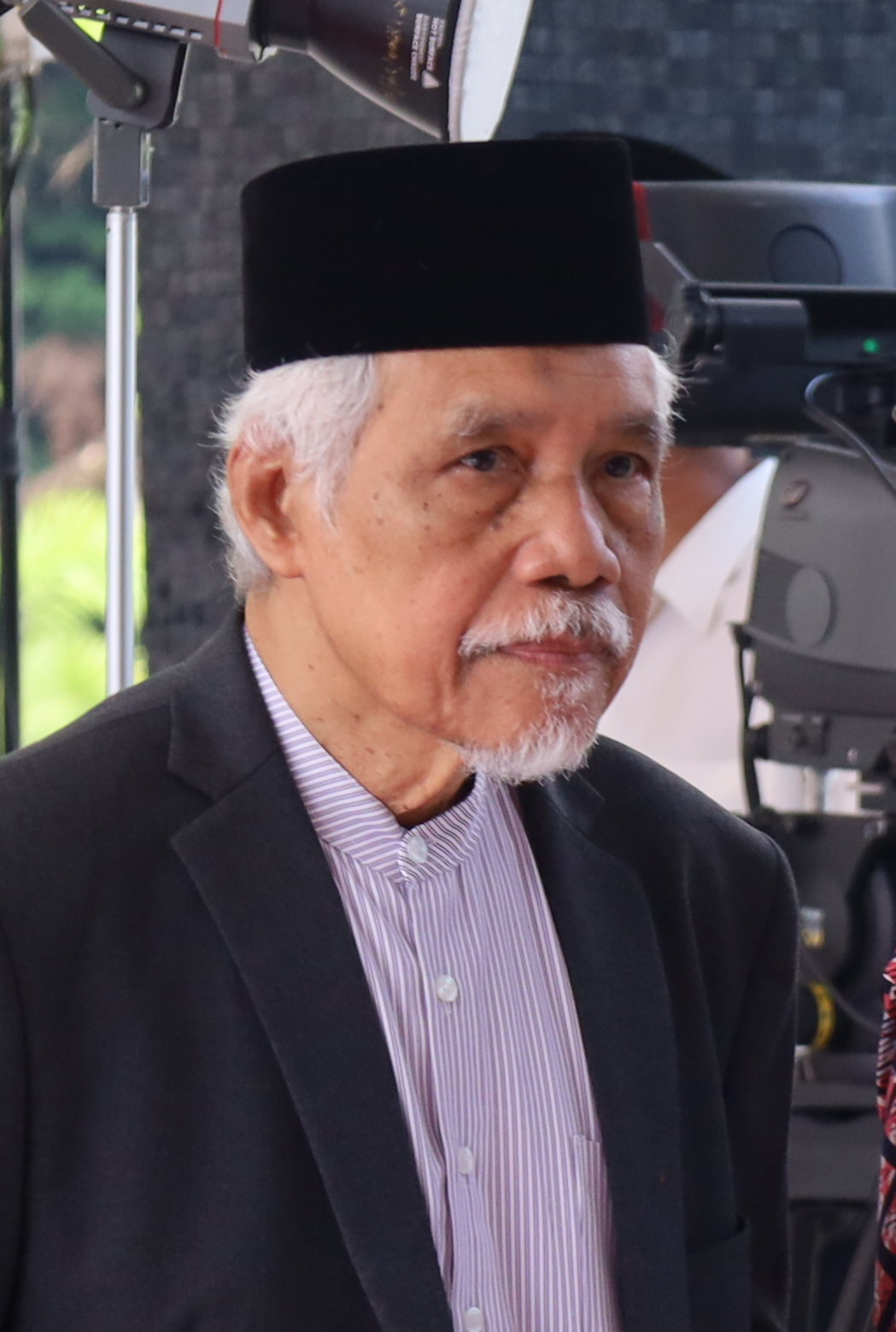
- Osman in 2025

Rector of the International Islamic University Malaysia
- Incumbent
- Assumed office 23 September 2024
- Constitutional Head: Tunku Azizah Aminah Maimunah Iskandariah
- Preceded by: Dzulkifli Abdul Razak

Personal details
- Born: 18 December 1946 (age 79) Temerloh, Pahang, Malaysia
- Education: University of London, Temple University

Academic background
- Influences: Al Ghazali, Seyyed Hossein Nasr

Academic work
- Era: Contemporary Islamic philosophy
- Main interests: Islamic Philosophy, Philosophy of Science, Islamic Science

Osman bin Bakar (born 18 December 1946) is a Malaysian philosopher. He is the current and 7th rector of International Islamic University Malaysia since 23 September 2024. He is an emeritus professor of philosophy at the University of Malaya, the Chair Professor and Director of Sultan Omar Ali Saifuddien Centre for Islamic Studies (SOASCIS), Universiti Brunei Darussalam and an Islamic philosopher. He is a fellow at the Center for Civilisational Dialogue in the University of Malaya and Doshisha University in Japan and a former President of the Islamic Academy of Sciences of Malaysia. He was the recipient of the honorary title "Dato" by the Sultan of Pahang in 1994 and "Datuk" by the King of Malaysia in 2000, and was included in the list of 500 most influential Muslims in the world several times.

== Biography ==
Born in 1946 in a small village close to the town of Temerloh in Malaysia's east coast state of Pahang, Osman Bakar attended his high school at Malay College Kuala Kangsar. In September 1967, he left Malaysia on a scholarship to study mathematics at the University of London, graduating with a Bachelor's degree in June 1970. He then returned to Malaysia to become a teacher in the Mathematics Department of the National University of Malaysia, Kuala Lumpur. Few months later, Osman returned to London to complete his postgraduate studies in Algebra at Bedford College, University of London. The next year, he earned a Master of Science degree. In the same year, Osman began his doctoral studies at the same college. However, he became very interested in religion and philosophy and began reading more books on Islamic thought and Western philosophy than algebra. He became particularly interested in the writings of the contemporary Iranian philosopher Seyyed Hossein Nasr, and medieval Islamic scholar Al-Ghazali. Eventually, he ended his doctoral studies in mathematics, returned to the National University of Malaysia in October 1973 and became a lecturer in the Mathematics Department.

Osman went to Temple University, Philadelphia in October 1981 to pursue his doctoral studies in Islamic philosophy of science under the tutelage of Seyyed Hossein Nasr. He wrote his dissertation on Islamic philosophy of science which was later published as Classification of Knowledge in Islam. He was promoted to Associate Professor in 1989 after receiving his PhD, and to Professor in 1992 as an expert in philosophy of science. From July to December 1992, he served as a Fulbright Visiting Scholar at the Department of History of Science of Harvard University where he conducted research on Mathematics in Muslim Culture. He was appointed the University of Malaya’s Deputy Vice Chancellor in 1995. In June 2000, however, he resigned from his post to take up a new position at Georgetown University, Washington, D.C., as Malaysia Chair of Islam in Southeast Asia.

== Influence ==
Osman has made major contributions in popularizing “Islamic science” and the intellectual discourse of “religion and science”, and has contributed to advancing cross-cultural studies, history and philosophy of science. His intellectual contributions made an impact in his own country, Malaysia, as well as in different parts of the Muslim world. He is the principal founder of the Islamic Academy of Science, which was founded in 1977. He served as its first Secretary-General (1977-1981), and later became the President (1987-1992). Among the aims of the Academy is to promote the study and research of "religion and science", particularly from an Islamic point of view. He was also the chief editor of the Academy's bilingual biannual journal Kesturi which he founded in 1991.

== Honours ==
- Malaysia
  - Commander of the Order of Meritorious Service (PJN) – Datuk (2000)
- Pahang
  - Knight Companion of the Order of the Crown of Pahang (DIMP) – Dato' (1994)

== Major works ==
Osman has authored eighteen books and more than three hundred articles. Some of his publications include:

=== As author ===
- Islamic Civilisation and The Modern World: Thematic Essays (2015).
- The History and Philosophy of Islamic Science. Islamic Texts Society, Cambridge (UK) 1999; 1991 edition published by Secretariat for Islamic Philosophy and Science, Science University of Penang and Nurin Enterprise, Kuala Lumpur under the title Tawhid and Science.
- Classification of Knowledge in Islam. Islamic Texts Society, Cambridge (UK) 1998; 1992 edition published by Institute for Policy Studies, Kuala Lumpur.
- Qur'anic Pictures of the Universe: The Scriptural Foundation of Islamic Cosmology (2018)

=== As editor ===
- Science, Technology, and Art in Human Civilizations (ed.) University of Malaya Press, Kuala Lumpur, 1992. (in Malay)
- Tawhid and Science (1991).
- Islam and Contemporary Scientific Thought (ed.) Islamic Academy of Science, Kuala Lumpur, 1989. (in Malay)
- Critique of Evolutionary Theory: A Collection of Essays (ed.) Islamic Academy of Science and Nurin Enterprise, Kuala Lumpur, 1987.
