= RHB Bank =

Malaysian bank

RHB Bank Berhad
- Formerly: Kwong Yik Bank Berhad
- Type: Publicly traded state-owned enterprise
- Traded as: MYX: 1066
- ISIN: MYL1066OO009
- Industry: Banking and finance
- Founded: 1997; 29 years ago following the merging of Kwong Yik Bank and DCB Bank. 1913; 113 years ago (as Kwong Yik Bank)
- Founder: Rashid Hussain
- Headquarters: Kuala Lumpur, Malaysia
- Number of locations: Malaysia - 234 branches
- Area served: Malaysia, Singapore, Brunei, Cambodia, Laos, Indonesia, Thailand
- Key people: Tan Sri Ahmad Badri Mohd Zahir, Chairman; Mohd Rashid Mohamad, Group Managing Director/Group CEO
- Products: Banking and financial services
- Revenue: ▼RM10.829 Billion (Fiscal Year Ended 31 December 2020)
- Operating income: ▲RM3.798 Billion (Fiscal Year Ended 31 December 2020)
- Net income: ▼RM2.039 Billion (Fiscal Year Ended 31 December 2020)
- Total assets: ▲RM271.149 Billion (Fiscal Year Ended 31 December 2020)
- Total equity: ▲RM27.056 Billion (Fiscal Year Ended 31 December 2020)
- Number of employees: 14,010 (As of May 2022)
- Parent: Employees Provident Fund
- Website: www.rhbgroup.com

RHB Bank Berhad (MYX: 1066) is a Malaysian bank based in Kuala Lumpur and founded in 1997. It is the fourth largest fully integrated financial services group in Malaysia. The company name RHB represents the initials of the founder, Rashid Hussain Berhad.

RHB Bank has over 200 branches in Malaysia and provides a range of banking products and services for individuals, small businesses and corporates. RHB Bank is one of the few banks in Malaysia that offers Islamic banking products and services. These products are offered through its subsidiary, RHB Islamic Bank Berhad. RHB Islamic Bank has a wide network of branches and ATMs in Malaysia and provides a range of banking products and services that are compliant with Shariah principles.

RHB Bank is listed on the Bursa Malaysia and has a market capitalisation of RM24.77 billion as of August 2022.

== History ==
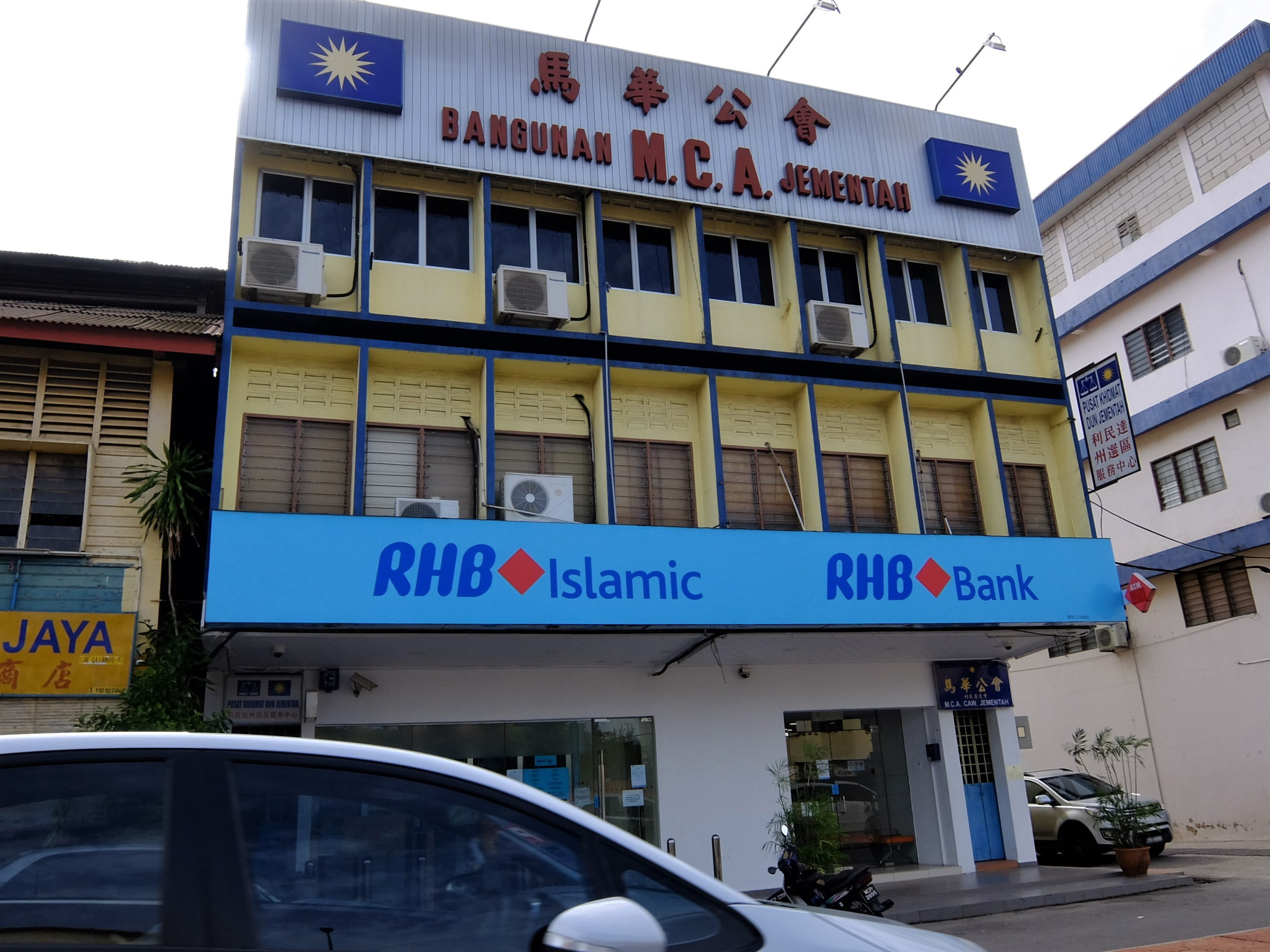
RHB Bank in Jementah, Johor

A wholly owned subsidiary of RHB Capital, RHB Bank Berhad is a result of three mergers –with Kwong Yik Bank Berhad in 1997, Sime Bank Berhad in 1999 and after pressure, Bank Utama (Malaysia) Berhad in 2003. Its key milestones through the mergers are as follows:

- Kwong Yik Bank Berhad was established in 1913 in Kuala Lumpur, making it Malaya's first local bank. Amongst the bank's co-founders were Chan Wing, Cheong Yoke Choy and Loke Yew. In 1997, Kwong Yik Bank Berhad merged with DCB Bank Berhad (Development & Commerce Bank, also known as D&C Bank), making it the country's biggest ever banking merger at that time.
- The United Malayan Banking Corporation Berhad ("UMBC") was set up in 1959 and subsequently became the first commercial bank to be established in independent Malaya when it was officially declared open in 1960.
- In 1996, UMBC became part of Sime Darby Berhad and was renamed Sime Bank Berhad. In 1999, it merged with RHB Bank and became part of RHB Banking Group.
- Bank Utama was incorporated in 1976. In 1998, Bank Utama merged its business operations with that of Kewangan Utama Berhad. In 2003, RHB Bank merged with Bank Utama.

In 2012, RHB Capital Berhad purchased 100% of OSK Investment Bank in a share swap agreement. In return, OSK received a 10.27% stake in the entire RHB group.

In 2013, RHB Banking Group celebrated RHB Bank's 100th Anniversary.

In 2016, RHB Bank Berhad assumed the listing status of RHB Capital Berhad as the financial holding company.

In 2017, a merger was proposed between RHB Bank and AmBank Group, but was scrapped as the parties failed to agree on mutually acceptable terms and conditions.
