= Ahmad Ibrahim Kulliyyah of Laws =

Coordinates: 3°15′05.9″N 101°44′16.5″E

Ahmad Ibrahim Kulliyyah of Laws (AIKOL) is the law faculty of International Islamic University Malaysia. Previously known as the Kulliyyah of Laws, it was renamed in 2000 in honour of its founder and ex-Dean, professor Ahmad Mohamed Ibrahim. Being the first faculty formed together with the university, it is now one of the largest law schools in Malaysia and has produced thousands of law graduates since 1983.

Classes are taught in English and Arabic. However, Bahasa Melayu is also taught to students to equip them with the understanding of legal jargons in the national language. The majority of the students are Malaysians.

== Courses offered ==
AIKOL offers a variety of courses ranging from LL.B (Honours), LL.B-S (Honours) for Shariah law students, MCL (Master of Comparative Laws) and up to PhD (Doctor of Philosophy). It also provides for programs for Diploma's in speciality areas. Under the Legal Profession Act 1976, a person awarded an LL.B (Honours) degree from AIKOL of IIUM is recognised as a 'qualified person' that may be admitted as an Advocate & Solicitor in the High Court, Malaysia, and is exempted from taking the Certificate of Legal Practice (Malaysia).

== Events ==
The Ahmad Ibrahim Memorial Lecture series is conducted annually by inviting experts and scholars to speak on diverse legal issues.

IIUM Mock Trial is an annual theatrical play conducted by the Law Society of AIKOL, traditionally held during the Convocation Week commonly known as Convest, at the AIKOL Moot Court or the IIUM Main Auditorium. Students reenact famous legal trials, with added dramatic elements like humour, suspense, horror and patriotism, as well as extensive stage props, costumes and gimmicks. Among the real cases that have been used in the past include Mona Fandey, Maria Hertogh, Botak Chin and Al-Ma'unah.

== Publications ==
The IIUM Law Journal is a peer-reviewed journal, published twice a year by AIKOL, with a mission of sharing ideas and information about legal developments relating to civil and Shariah laws.

The Law Majalla, started in 1985, is the first student-run law journal in Malaysia. The Law Society of AIKOL is also in charge of the student-run newsletter called The Lexicon.

== Notable alumni ==
=== Academia ===
- Shahab Ahmed, Associate Professor of Islamic Studies, Harvard University.

=== Executive ===
- Azalina Othman Said, Minister of Youth and Sports, Minister of Tourism, Minister in the Prime Minister's Department, Deputy Speaker of the Dewan Rakyat.
- Mastura Mohd Yazid, MP Kuala Kangsar, Perak and Deputy Minister in Prime Minister's Department (Special Functions).
- Mohamad Alamin, Deputy Minister of Education II.
- Mohamed Hanipa Maidin, MP Sepang, Selangor, Deputy Minister in the Prime Minister's Department (Law).
- Noriah Kasnon, MP Sungai Besar, Selangor and Deputy Minister of Women, Family and Community Development.
- Rosnah Shirlin, Head of Puteri UMNO Malaysia, Deputy Minister of Health, and Deputy Minister of Works.
- Shamsul Iskandar Md. Akin, MP Hang Tuah Jaya, Melaka and Deputy Minister of Primary Industry.
- Syed Saddiq Syed Abdul Rahman, MP Muar, Johor, Minister of Youth and Sports.

=== Government/Agency ===
- Dzulkifli Ahmad, Chief Commissioner, Malaysian Anti-Corruption Commission.
- Iskandar Ismail, CEO, Malaysia Competition Commission (MyCC).
- Marzuki Mohamad, Chairman, Institute for Youth Research Malaysia, and Principal Private Secretary to Prime Minister Muhyiddin Yassin.

=== Legal ===
- Cherno Jallow, Judge, Supreme Court of the Gambia, and Attorney General of the British Virgin Islands.
- Rohana Yusuf, President, Court of Appeal of Malaysia
- Hassan Saeed, Attorney-General of the Republic of Maldives.
- Husnu Al Suood, Attorney-General of the Republic of Maldives.
- Marie Saine-Firdaus, Attorney General of the Gambia.

=== Politics ===
- Amira Aisya, State Assemblyman, Puteri Wangsa, Johor.
- Irmohizam Ibrahim, MP Kuala Selangor, Selangor.
- Fong Po Kuan, MP Batu Gajah, Perak.
- Muhammad Faiz Fadzil, State Assemblyman Permatang Pasir, Pulau Pinang.
- Mohd Yusmadi Mohd Yusoff, MP Balik Pulau, Pulau Pinang and Senator.
- Mumtaz Md. Nawi, MP Kubang Kerian, State Assemblyman Demit, Kelantan, Senator.
- Terence Naidu, State Assemblyman Pasir Bedamar, Perak.
- Wong Kah Woh, State Assemblyman
- Muhammad Kamil Abdul Munim, Political Secretary to the Minister of Finance

=== Royalty ===
- HRH Tengku Amalin A'ishah Putri, Kelantanese Princess and Magistrate officer.

=== Miscellaneous ===
- Ismail Omar, Inspector General of Police, Royal Malaysian Police.
- Khalid Abu Bakar, Inspector General of Police, Royal Malaysian Police.

== Notable faculty members (current and former) ==
- Ahmad Mohamed Ibrahim, Attorney-General of Singapore and Dean of Faculty of Law, Universiti Malaya.
- Abdul Aziz Bari, Perak State Exco and constitutional scholar.
- Mohammad Hashim Kamali, internationally renowned Islamic jurist
- Rusni Hassan, member of Shariah Advisory Council, Bank Negara Malaysia.
- Shad Saleem Faruqi, constitutional scholar
- Zaleha Kamarudin, Rector of International Islamic University Malaysia.
