= Rashid Hussain =

Malaysian entrepreneur (born 1946)

Yang Berbahagia Tan Sri Dato' (Dr) Rashid Hussain PSM DSSA
- Born: Abdul Rashid Hussain; 7 November 1946 (age 79); Colony of Singapore
- Education: Raffles Institution
- Occupation: Entrepreneur
- Years active: 1971–present
- Title: President of International Islamic University Malaysia; Founder of RHB Group; Chairman of Tabung Haji
- Spouses: Sue Kuok (m. 1989, divorced) Hani Yang Mohd. Yatim (m. 2016)
- Children: 3

Tan Sri Dato' Abdul Rashid Hussain (born 1946 in Singapore) is the current President of International Islamic University Malaysia, the Chairman for Tabung Haji, and a Malaysian entrepreneur. He is the founder of the RHB Group.

== Career ==
In less than a decade, Rashid built a financial services conglomerate comprising a stockbroking firm, a commercial bank, a finance company and a merchant bank. He began his financial services career in 1971 with Strauss Turnbull in Britain and returned to Malaysia in 1975 to work in Bumiputra Merchant Bankers Berhad. He then left Bumiputra Merchant Bankers in 1983 to start Rashid Hussain Securities. Under his stewardship, RHB Securities became one of the leading stockbrokers in Malaysia.

In the mid-1990s, under Rashid Hussain's leadership, RHB Vision City was developed as a joint venture with Korean company Daewoo, which supplied all the construction know-how. The development was originally abandoned due to the 1997 Asian Financial Crisis, however, it was bought by Quill Retail Malls Sdn. Bhd. in 2007 for RM430 million. It is now fully complete and the development has been renamed Quill City.

He is known by some as "the most capable Malaysian-Muslim entrepreneur of his generation".

Rashid Hussain was the Chairman of Putrajaya Holdings Sdn Bhd from 1995 to 2000 and served as a board member and Chairman of the executive committee of Khazanah Nasional Berhad from 1994 to 1998.

In late 2023, Rashid Hussain came out of retirement to become the chairman of Tabung Haji. He previously served as a member of the Royal Commission of Inquiry in 2022, which examined the management and governance issues at Tabung Haji.

== Personal life ==
He married Sue Kuok, daughter of Robert Kuok, also known by her Muslim name Puan Sri Suraya Abdullah, in 1989. They have since divorced. He married Puan Sri Yang Amylia Hani in 2016, who holds a law degree and a fitness instructor license.

Hussain is the youngest son of Mohammed Hussain, who hailed from Penang and later moved to Singapore and developed a successful business there. His mother is of Malay and Arab descent.

== Honours ==
=== Honours of Malaysia ===
- Malaysia
  - Commander of the Order of Loyalty to the Crown of Malaysia (PSM) – Tan Sri (1993)
- Selangor
  - Knight Companion of the Order of Sultan Salahuddin Abdul Aziz Shah (DSSA) – Dato' (1991)

=== Honorary degrees ===
- Malaysia
  - Honorary Doctorate in Business from Wawasan Open University - (Dr.) (2019)
