= Solehah Yaacob =

Malaysian scholar of Arabic linguistics

Dr Solehah Yaacob
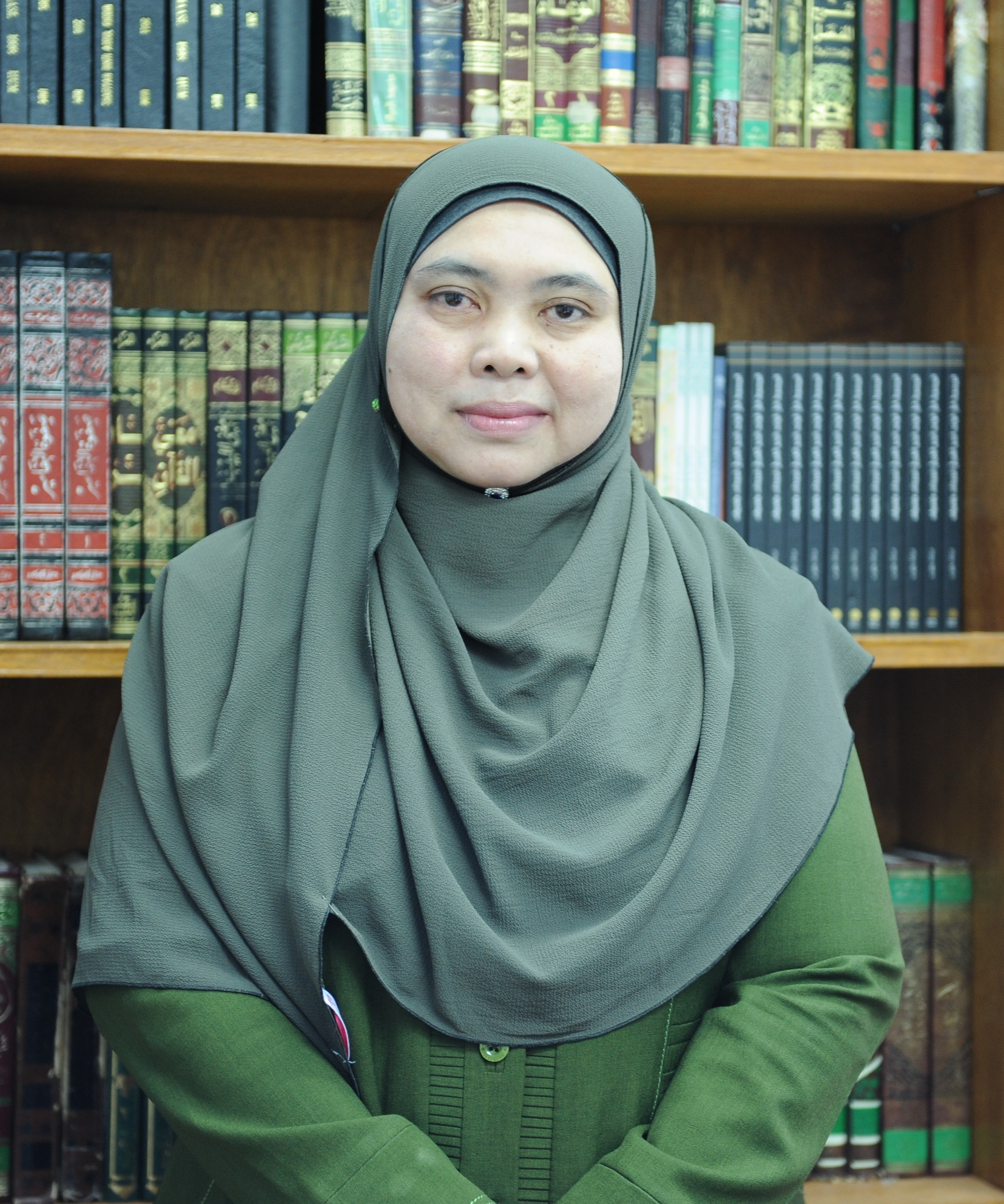
- Official portrait, 2018
- Born: Pasir Mas, Kelantan, Malaysia
- Occupations: Linguist, academic
- Known for: Scholarship in Arabic grammatical theory and historical linguistics
- Title: Professor of Arabic linguistics

Solehah Yaacob is a Malaysian linguist, academic and author who had served as Professor of Arabic linguistics at the International Islamic University Malaysia (IIUM) until April 2026. Recognised for her scholarly work on Arabic grammatical philosophy and the historical development of the language, she has contributed several studies examining the relationship between Arabic, civilisation and Islamic intellectual heritage. Her work is frequently associated with IIUM’s broader intellectual project of integrating Islamic values within contemporary academic disciplines.

Solehah Yaacob is widely known for a series of controversial pseudohistorical claims. Her claims include that ancient Malays could fly and taught the Chinese "flying kung fu", that ancient Romans have learned shipbuilding techniques from Malays, and that the abundance of iron ore in ancient Kedah resulted of meteor strikes. In August 2026, IIUM confirmed that it had terminated Solehah's employment with effect from 27 April and that she was no longer permitted to identify herself as a professor or claim any official affiliation with the university.

== Early life and education ==
Solehah was born in Pasir Mas, Kelantan and pursued all her tertiary education at IIUM. After completing a bachelor’s degree in the Arabic language and literature and a master’s degree in Teaching Arabic as a Second Language, she earned a PhD in Arabic linguistics. Her doctoral dissertation examined the historical evolution of the classical theory of ʿamal, a cornerstone of Arabic grammatical analysis.

== Academic career ==
Solehah began her career at IIUM in 1995 and later becoming full professor in 2020. At the Kulliyyah of Islamic Revealed Knowledge and Human Sciences, she taught courses on Arabic grammar, semantics, pragmatics, historical linguistics and comparative linguistic theory.

Solehah also works as the editor-in-chief of the Journal of Arabic Language Specialized Research (J-ALSR) and has overseen publications on contemporary and classical debates in Arabic linguistics. She has also collaborated with Dewan Bahasa dan Pustaka (DBP), IIIT and other national research bodies on Arabic language studies and the Islamisation of the human sciences.

=== Controversial claims ===
In September 2024, a video clip circulated on social media in which Solehah discussed claims that Khadija bint Khuwaylid, the first wife of the Islamic prophet Muhammad, may have originated from the Malay world. Solehah later denied claiming that Khadija was Malay, saying that the video had been edited.

In September 2025, Solehah claimed on a Gabungan Nasionalis ("Nationalist Coalition") podcast that ancient Malays could fly and had taught the Chinese "flying kung fu". Malaysian historians rejected the claim as myth rather than history.

In November 2025, a brief excerpt from one of Solehah's lectures, in which she claimed the Romans had learned to build ships from Malays, circulated online and became the subject of regional media coverage. Media coverage from Sinar Harian, Berita Harian, New Straits Times, Malaysiakini, Free Malaysia Today, The Rakyat Post, The Straits Times and the South China Morning Post documented various public responses and institutional clarifications. In mid-November 2025, the International Islamic University of Malaysia confirmed it would establish an internal inquiry panel to examine Solehah's claims, pending disciplinary proceedings.

Also in November 2025, independent scholar Sharifah Munirah Alatas pointed out that Solehah's 2018 paper had cited a satirical news from The Onion as factual evidence. The news jokingly claimed that historians had fabricated ancient Greek civilisation. Sharifah Munirah called for Solehah‘s paper to be retracted, citing its use of an unreliable source and improper attribution.

In March 2026, Solehah asserted that Rentap, a prominent 19th-century Iban warrior, was of Malay ancestry and a descendant of the legendary Malaccan figure Hang Tuah. The claim was disputed by Malaysian academics, who accused her of attempting to rewrite Sarawak's history.

In August 2026, Solehah was reported presenting a theory that the abundance of iron ore mined and smelted in ancient Kedah was due to a meteor shower. This theory was refuted with archeological studies of the iron ore recovered at the Sungai Batu Archaeological Complex, showing that the ore was of earthly origins, and there was no records of a meteor shower that could drop iron ore in the area.

=== Termination from IIUM ===
On 23 August 2026, IIUM confirmed that it had terminated Solehah's employment on 27 April. As part of her termination, Solehah was prohibited from using any titles or positions linking her to IIUM in any promotional materials, media reports, advertisements, social media content, publicity material, or any other form of public dissemination. Solehah intended to challenge the termination in the Industrial Court on grounds that the university was unprofessional about the termination, refusing to allow her to appeal it. Solehah said that she had postponed the University's academic inquiry meeting three times due to a hospital admission, sick leave and a paid programme that she was hosting. However, she has crossed the 60-day limit for challenging the dismissal.

== Research and scholarship ==
=== Arabic grammatical philosophy ===
Much of Solehah’s scholarship centres on the classical Arabic grammatical tradition. In her analytical study of the theory of ʿamal, she re-examines the conceptual foundations of Arabic syntax and its philosophical underpinnings. Her work frequently highlights the intellectual sophistication of early Arabic grammarians and the organic relationship between linguistic theory, logic and Islamic intellectual history.

=== Semantics, pragmatics and rhetoric ===
Her 2018 monograph connects the classical field of Arabic rhetoric (balāghah) with modern semantic and pragmatic theory, presenting the two traditions as complementary rather than competing. She has also contributed to studies on the linguistic and cultural dimensions of pre-modern Arabic texts.

=== Historical linguistics ===
Solehah’s work in historical linguistics frames Arabic as a central civilisational language with a long intellectual reach across regions and time periods. Her DBP monograph discusses the evolution of Arabic and its interactions with neighbouring linguistic and cultural spheres. She has also examined comparative Semitic linguistics, proposing ways in which classical Arabic may serve as a reference point for understanding the broader family of Semitic languages.

=== Islamisation of knowledge ===
In line with IIUM’s long-standing institutional mission, Solehah has written on the integration of Islamic ethical perspectives into contemporary knowledge production. Her work in this area explores how language, meaning and ethical reasoning interact within both Islamic and modern academic frameworks.

== Selected works ==
=== Books ===
- Yaacob, Solehah (2014). Dirāsah Naqdiyyah fī al-Tafkīr al-Naḥwī al-ʿArabī. Cairo: Dar as-Salam.
- Yaacob, Solehah (2016). The Intricacy and Delicacy in the Historical Development of Arabic Language. Kuala Lumpur: Dewan Bahasa dan Pustaka.
- Yaacob, Solehah (2018). Balaghah, Semantik dan Pragmatik Bahasa Arab. Kuala Lumpur: IIUM Press.

=== Articles ===
- Yaacob, Solehah (2014). "Arabic Language as the Foundation of Semitic Languages". Arab World English Journal. 5 (3): 278–290.
- Yaacob, Solehah (2019). "The Syntactical Regulator in Arabic Syntax: An Analytical Study". Intellectual Discourse.
- Yaacob, Solehah (2022). "The Relationship between Literature, Language and Culture in Ancient Texts". Majalah Al-Dad.
- Yaacob, Solehah (2024). "Integration of Islamic Values within Science Based on IOHK Theory". International Journal of Religion. doi:10.61707/nfpvgm22.
- Yaacob, Solehah (2025). "A Review of Arabic Linguistic Argumentations and Their Misconceptions". Journal of Advanced Research in Social and Behavioural Sciences. 28 (2).
