= International Islamic University Malaysia =

Public university in Gombak, Malaysia

Coordinates: 3°15′10″N 101°44′15″E

- Universiti Islam Antarabangsa Malaysia (Malay) اونيۏرسيتي إسلام انتارابڠسا مليسيا (Jawi) الجامعة الإسلامية العالمية بماليزيا (Arabic)
- Emblem
- Motto: Taman Ilmu dan Budi (Malay)
- Motto in English: Garden of Knowledge and Virtue
- Type: Public university
- Established: 23 May 1983; 43 years ago
- Affiliations: ASAIHL, ACU, AUAP, FUIW
- Endowment: RM400 million (2018)
- Chancellor: Tunku Azizah Aminah Maimunah Iskandariah
- President: Abdul Rashid Hussain
- Rector: Osman Bakar
- Faculty: 1,904 (2019)
- Students: 26,266 (2019)
- Location: Jln Gombak, 53100 Kuala Lumpur, Wilayah Persekutuan Kuala Lumpur, Malaysia, Gombak, Selangor, Malaysia
- Campus: Suburban, 700 acres (2.8 km²)
- Colours: gold and turquoise
- Nickname: Mustangs
- Website: www.iium.edu.my

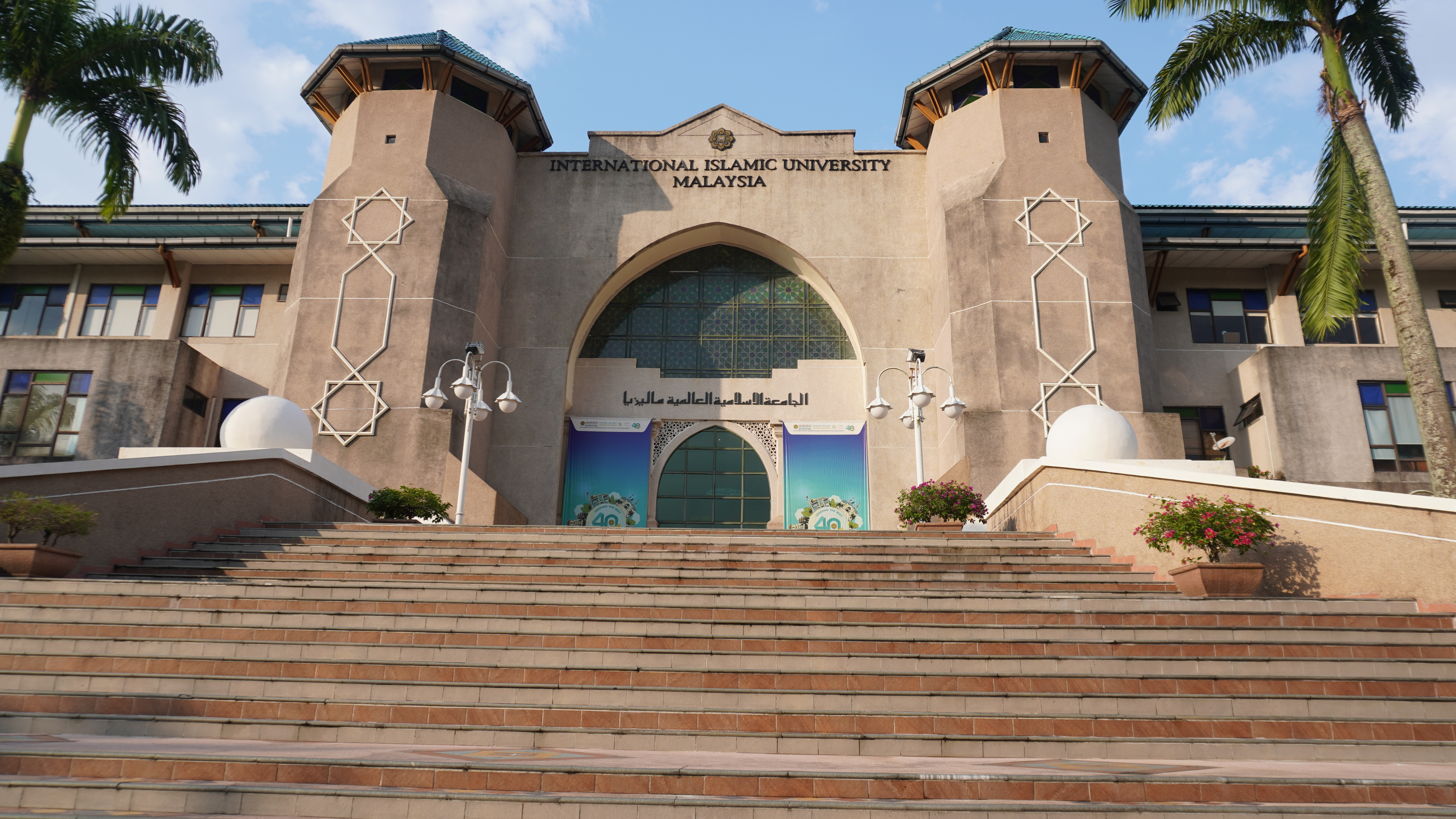
Muhammad Abdul-Rauf Building serves as the administration building, and as a landmarks of its Gombak campus being located in front of the main entrance.

The International Islamic University Malaysia (IIUM) (Note: Malay: Universiti Islam Antarabangsa Malaysia; Jawi: اونيۏرسيتي اسلام انتارابڠسا مليسيا; Arabic: الجامعة الإسلامية العالمية بماليزيا; romanized: al-Jāmʿia al-ʾIslāmiyya al-ʾĀlamiyya Bimaliziya) is a public university in Malaysia. Headquartered in Gombak, Selangor, IIUM has six other campuses all over Malaysia: two medical-centric campuses and a Centre for Foundation Studies in Gambang, Pahang, two city campuses in Kuala Lumpur, and a language and tourism campus in Pagoh, Johor.

The university is sponsored by eight governments and the Organisation of Islamic Cooperation (OIC). It is distinct from the Indonesian International Islamic University and International Islamic University Chittagong, Bangladesh.

The university was established on 23 May 1983 and founded upon Islamic principles. Islamic values are inculcated into all disciplines. IIUM offers bachelor's, master's and doctoral degrees courses at its 14 faculties or "Kulliyyah" ("Kulliyyat", in plural).

Since 1987, IIUM has produced more than 70,000 graduates and undergraduates from more than 100 countries, as of 2020, with majority of them were Malaysians. Its medium of instruction is English, with Arabic used in courses related to the study of Islamic Sciences, although the university also uses Bahasa Malaysia in certain courses. IIUM is one of the only two public universities in Malaysia to have English as the official language of instruction and administration, the other being Universiti Teknologi MARA (UiTM).

== History ==
Prime Minister Mahathir Mohamad conceived the idea for an international institution of Islamic education in 1982 during a meeting between OIC leaders about the Islamization of knowledge. The idea was shared with the then-minister of education, Sulaiman Daud; the then-director-general of education, Murad Mohamed Nor; and two others. Mohd Kamal Hassan, then of the National University of Malaysia, along with a senior academic official who attended the meeting, produced the first working paper on the concept of the university.

The first logo used by IIUM (back when it was known only as IIU), before the introduction of the current logo.

Ismail al-Faruqi, a prominent scholar, played a significant role in this movement. He advised political leaders in the Muslim world, including Muhammad Zia-ul-Haq in Pakistan and Mahathir Mohamad. During Zia-ul-Haq’s administration, al-Faruqi contributed to the establishment of the International Islamic University in Islamabad in 1980, which aimed to integrate Islamic values with contemporary academic disciplines. In Malaysia, al-Faruqi's advisory role was instrumental in the foundation of the university in 1983. These institutions were part of broader efforts to develop educational systems that combined religious and secular knowledge, fostering intellectual and cultural development in the Muslim world.

The university would be the first Islamic university in the world to conceptualize the "integration of knowledge with morals," a concept adopted at the International Convention of Islamic Education in Mecca, Saudi Arabia in 1976.

IIUM was once a private university. As the university's language of instruction was not to be Malay but instead English and Arabic, which was initially prohibited by Malaysian law, IIUM was initially incorporated under the currently repealed Companies Act 1965. It was an absolute authority of the Companies Act 1965 allows IIUM to stay using English as its official language and it does not fully exempted from Malay language usage as per act although IIUM are not obligated to adhere the National Language Act 1963/1967. However, IIUM was officially made a public university on 23 May 1983, by Section 5A (2) of the Universities and University Colleges Act 1971, when the university received its establishment order from the then King, Ahmad Shah of Pahang, after an exchange of diplomatic notes of co-sponsorship between the government of Malaysia, seven other governments and OIC.

A batch of 153 students from Malaysia and abroad were enrolled for the first academic session, which started on 8 July 1983. Courses were conducted under the Faculty of Economics, the Faculty of Laws, the Centre for Fundamental Knowledge, and the Centre for Languages. The members of this first batch received their degrees and diplomas during the first convocation held on 10 October 1987. 68 graduates were conferred the degree of Bachelor of Economics, 56 other graduates received the degree of Bachelor of Laws, and 29 Qadhis were conferred Diploma in Law and Administration of Islamic Judiciary.

Ahmad Shah of Pahang was the founding constitutional head since 1 July 1983. Before his death, he was replaced by his daughter-in-law, the current Tengku Ampuan of Pahang, Tunku Azizah Aminah Maimunah Iskandariah. She was made the constitutional head on 12 April 2019 for a five-year term, ending her father-in-law's chancellery in IIUM for 36 years, but the instrument of appointment was only presented to her by the federal government on 17 June 2019.

Tan Sri Abdul Rashid Hussain, was appointed as the 10th IIUM President effective 1 July 2025. He was appointed in recognition of his distinguished leadership and reputation in the Malaysian corporate sector, particularly in Islamic finance.

On 2 September 2025, the Institute of International and Asean Studies (IINTAS) was formally established as a think tank under the IIUM during a ceremony where Higher Education Minister Datuk Seri Dr. Zambry Abd Kadir was the guest of honour.

== Visual identity ==
IIUM introduced its first corporate logo upon its establishment in 1983 and used as a temporary logo before adopting the current logo. In 1988, the university introduced a new corporate logo, which was created by its Office for Communication, Advocacy and Promotion, featuring the emblem consists of the Koran, the Kaaba, eight inner domes pointing at eight directions and the outer domes, accompanied by the names of the university in Arabic, English and Bahasa Malaysia. However, the IIUM's official name in Bahasa Malaysia were rendered in Jawi script. The logo has since used permanently by the university although there was slight changes.

The university's official motto, "Garden of Knowledge and Virtue" in English or "Taman Ilmu dan Budi" in Malay, was introduced by the third IIUM Rector, Mohd Kamal Hassan and has been in use since 2000. IIUM also have two other slogans, "Leading the Way. Leading the World.", used since 2019 and "Tawhidic Epistemology, Ummatic Excellence", used since 2024.

== Leaders since 1983 ==
=== Constitutional Heads ===
Constitutional Heads
#	Name	Term start	Term end
1	Ahmad Shah of Pahang	1 July 1983	11 April 2019
2	Tunku Azizah Aminah Maimunah Iskandariah	12 April 2019	Present

=== Presidents ===
Presidents
#	Name	Term start	Term end
1	Hussein Onn	1983	1987
2	Anwar Ibrahim	1988	1998
3	Najib Razak	1998	1999
4	Sanusi Junid	February 2000	1 June 2008
5	Mohd Sidek Hassan	2 June 2008	1 June 2013
6	Rais Yatim	2 June 2013	1 June 2018
7	Maszlee Malik	5 September 2018	9 November 2018
8	Mohd Daud Bakar	1 July 2019	30 June 2022
9	Samsudin Osman	1 July 2022	30 June 2025
10	Abdul Rashid Hussain	1 July 2025	Present

=== Rectors ===
Rectors
#	Name	Term start	Term end
1	Muhammad M. Abdul Rauf	1984	1989
2	Abdul Hamid AbuSulayman	1989	1998
3	Mohd Kamal Hassan	5 April 1998	31 May 2006
4	Syed Arabi Idid	1 June 2006	1 June 2011
5	Zaleha Kamarudin	2 August 2011	31 July 2018
6	Dzulkifli Abdul Razak	1 August 2018	31 July 2024
7	Osman Bakar	21 September 2024	Present

== Campus ==
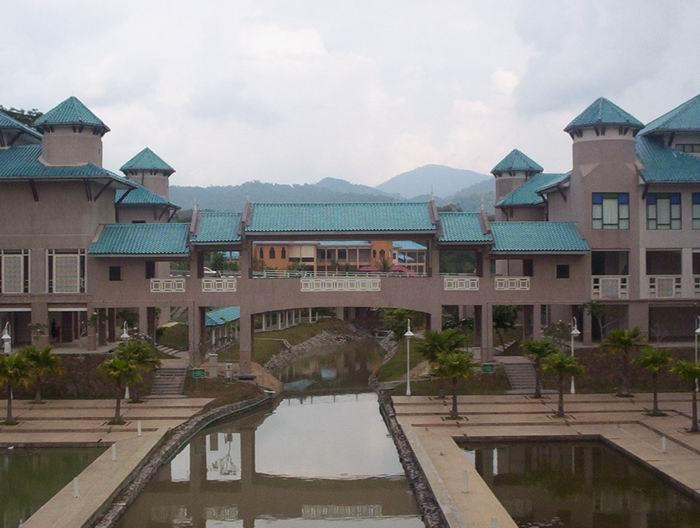
International Islamic University Malaysia, Gombak Campus

IIUM is headquartered at a 700-acre (2.8 km²) campus at Gombak, Selangor and has six other campuses. Three of the campuses are in Kuantan, Pahang, with the Centre for Foundation Studies situated at Gambang, a medical-centric campus situated at Bandar Indera Mahkota, and a clinical campus situated near Tengku Ampuan Afzan Hospital. Two city campuses are located at Persiaran Duta and Damansara Heights, Kuala Lumpur, both for the International Institute of Islamic Thought and Civilisation (ISTAC). Another campus is located at Bandar Universiti Pagoh, Johor for the Kulliyyah of Sustainable Tourism and Contemporary Language (KSTCL).

=== Centres of studies ===
IIUM has 14 following faculties. Each of them is, in Arabic, called "Kulliyyah" ("Kulliyyat" in plural):

Kulliyyahs by Campus
Kulliyyah	Abbreviation	Campus
Ahmad Ibrahim Kulliyyah of Laws	AIKOL	Gombak
Kulliyyah of Economics and Management Sciences	KENMS	Gombak
AbdulHamid AbuSulayman Kulliyyah of Islamic Revealed Knowledge and Human Sciences	AHAS KIRKHS	Gombak
Kulliyyah of Architecture and Environmental Design	KAED	Gombak
Kulliyyah of Engineering	KOE	Gombak
Kulliyyah of Education	KOED	Gombak
Kulliyyah of Information and Communication Technology	KICT	Gombak
Kulliyyah of Medicine	KOM	Kuantan
Kulliyyah of Dentistry	KOD	Kuantan
Kulliyyah of Allied Health Sciences	KAHS	Kuantan
Kulliyyah of Science	KOS	Kuantan
Kulliyyah of Nursing	KON	Kuantan
Kulliyyah of Pharmacy	KOP	Kuantan
Kulliyyah of Sustainable Tourism and Contemporary Language	KSTCL	Pagoh

=== Gallery ===
IIUM facilities

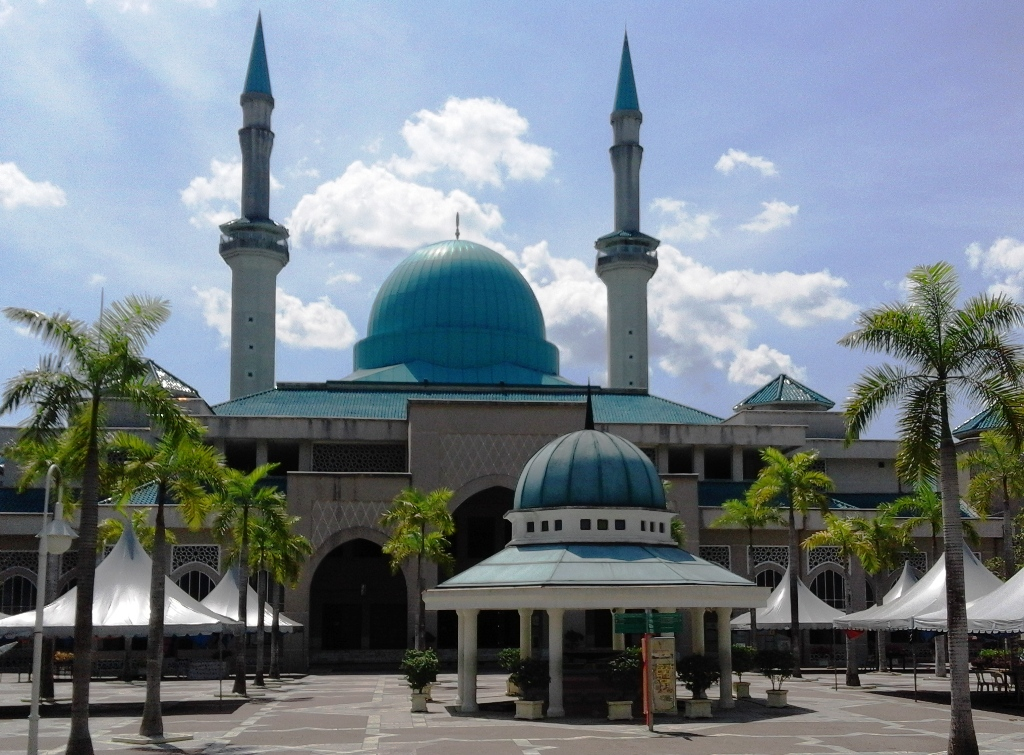
Sultan Haji Ahmad Shah Mosque, Gombak Campus (outside view)

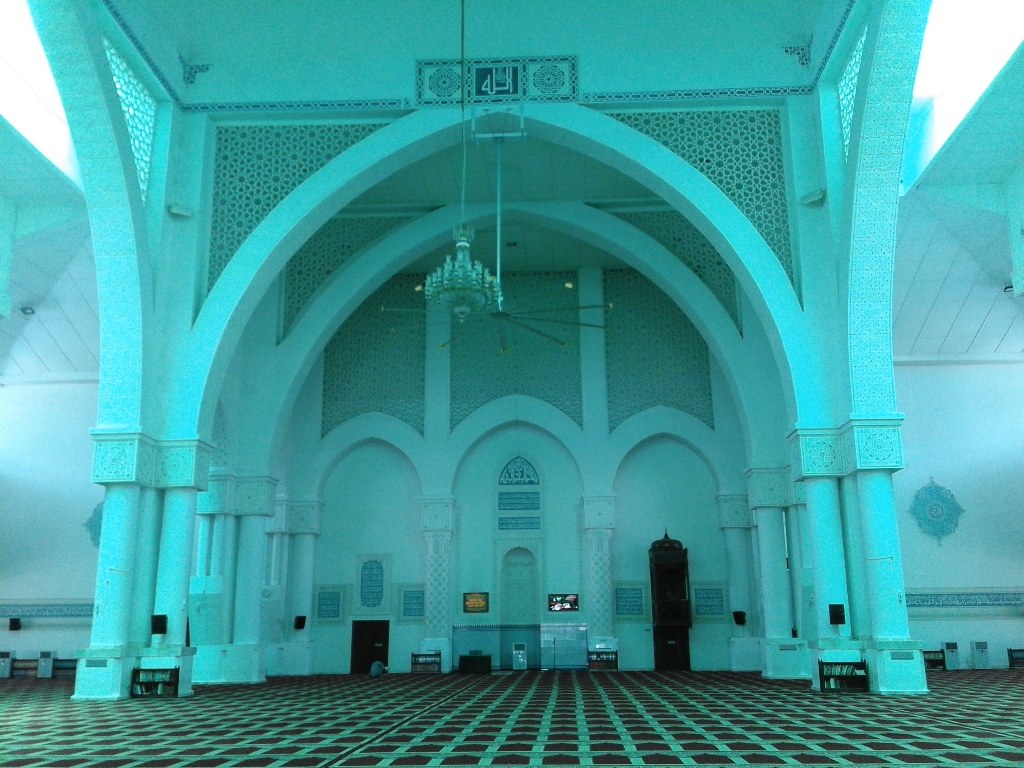
Sultan Haji Ahmad Shah Mosque, Gombak Campus (inside view)

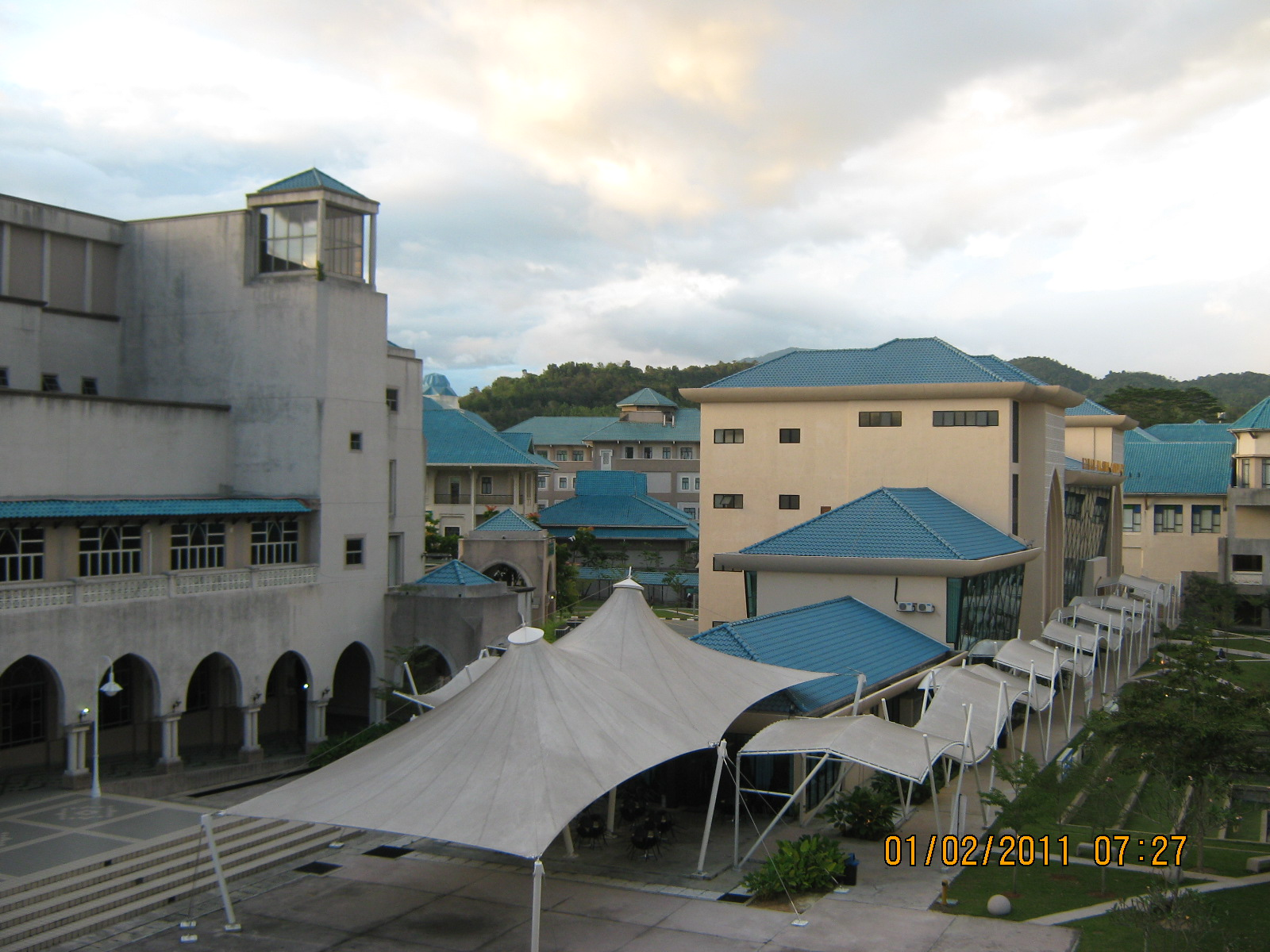
Cultural Centre (at left side) and Azman Hashim Complex (at right side)

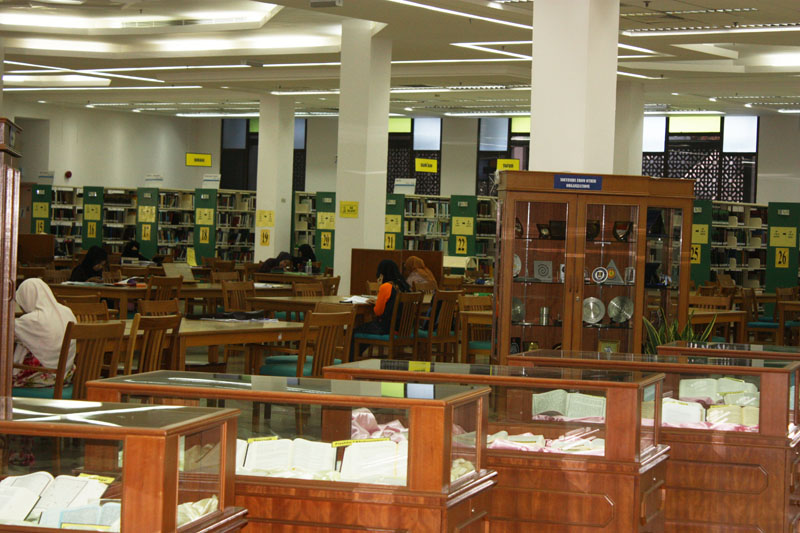
Library at Gombak Campus

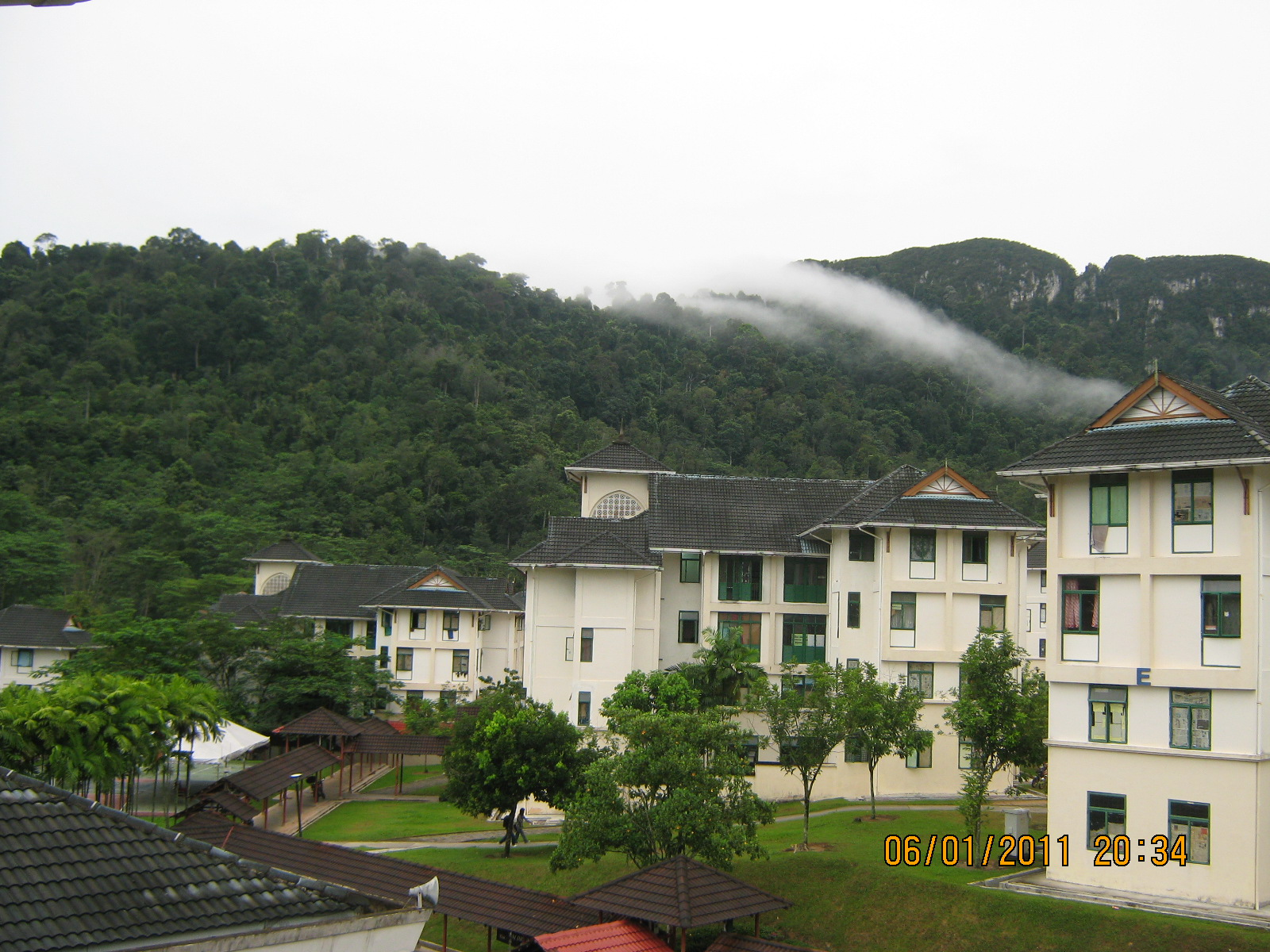
Mahallah al-Faruq, one of 17 residential colleges existed in Gombak Campus

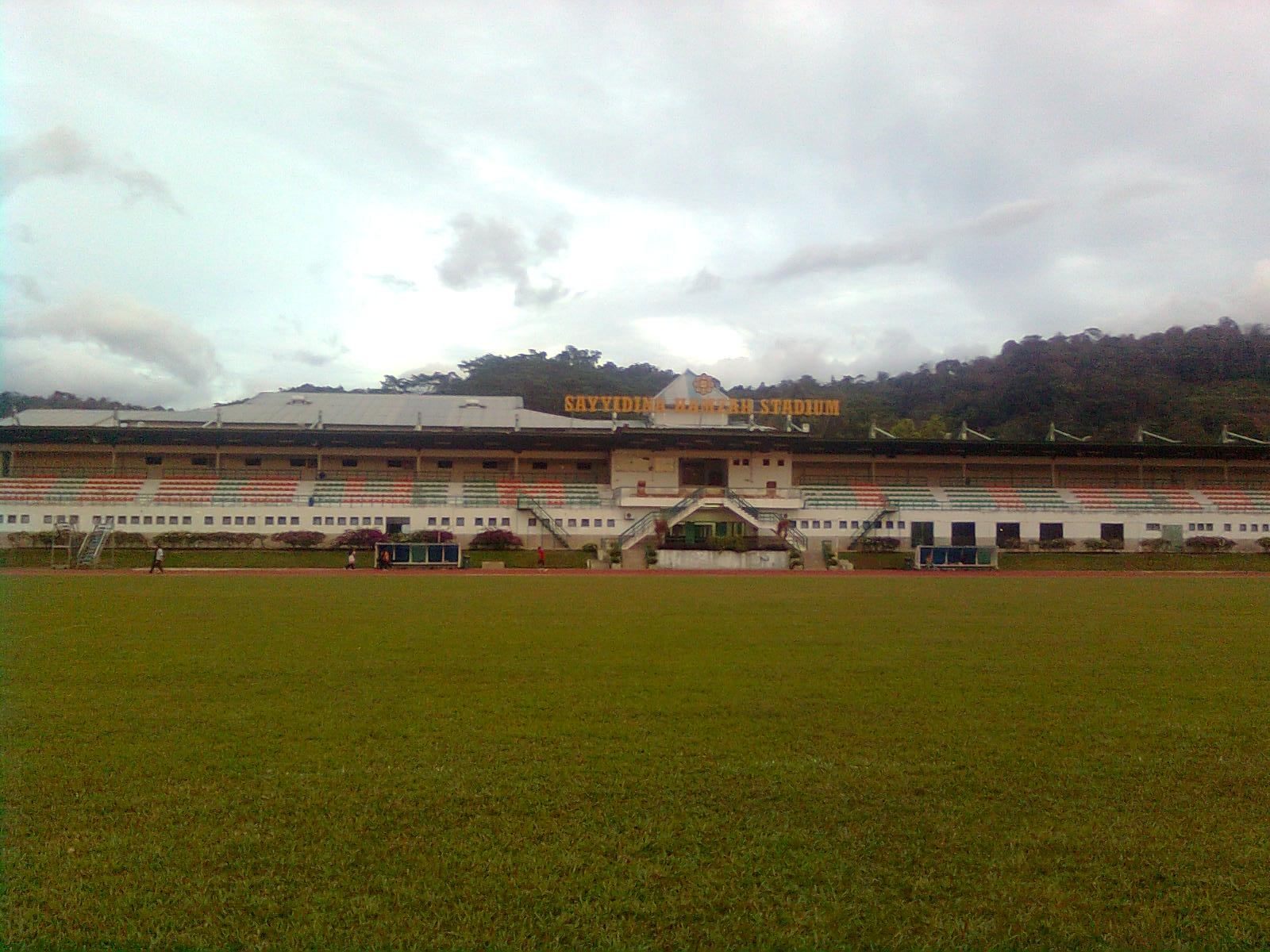
Sayyidina Hamzah Stadium

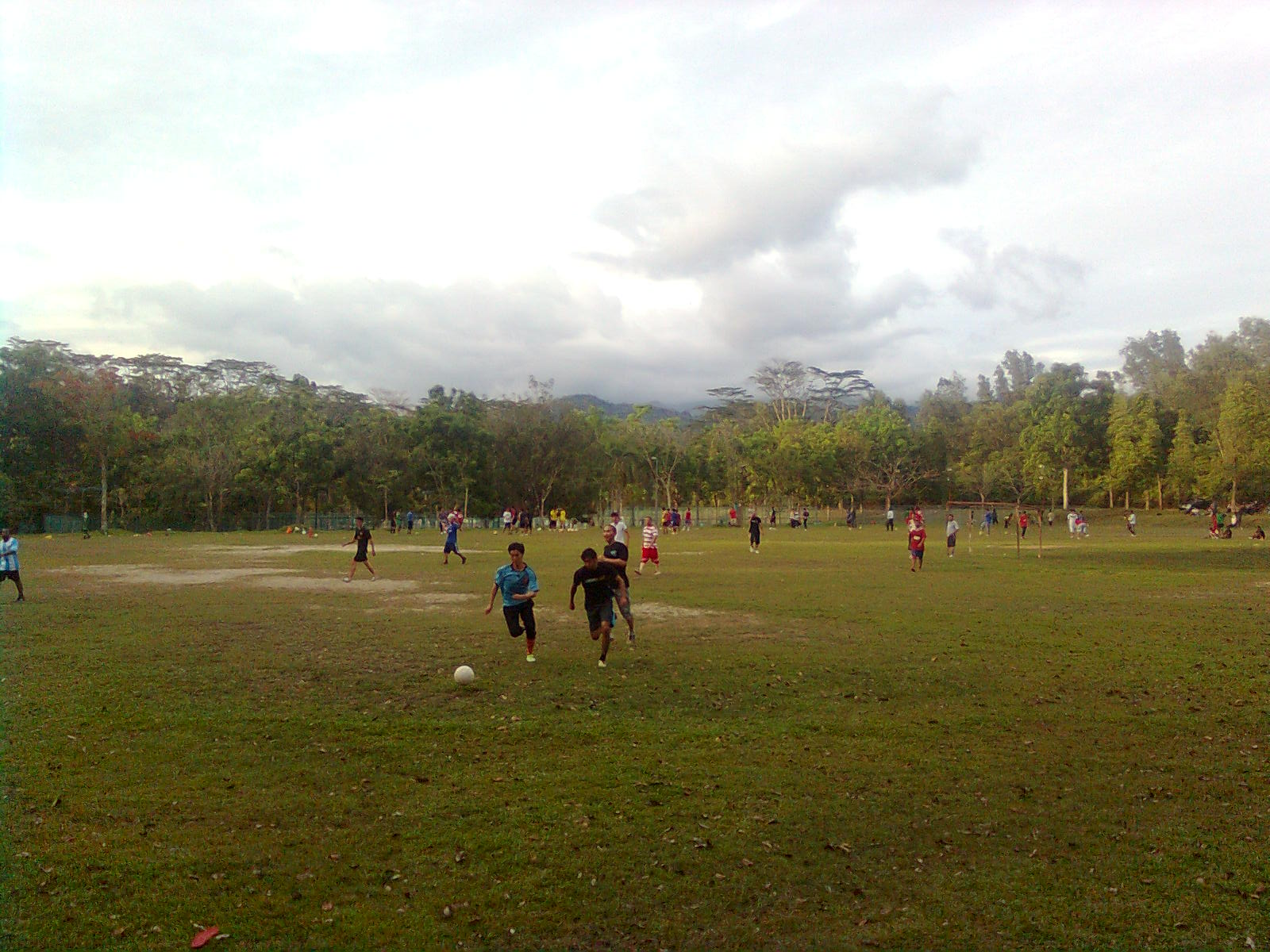
Football field

== Academics ==
=== Usrah ===
IIUM is the only public university in Malaysia that requires all of its foundation and undergraduate students to attend Usrah, i.e. Islamic study circle held weekly for the purpose of social, spiritual and intellectual enhancement. Since the establishment of IIUM, Usrah has been a requirement for students to graduate from IIUM. Since 2014, a separate Usrah has been held at residential colleges in addition to centralised Usrah, which is also compulsory to intermediate undergraduate students living in campus.

IIUM is also the only public university in Malaysia that requires all of its students to undergo a community engagement usrah programme known as Usrah in Action, where students undergo two consecutive semesters of organising sustainability projects to help local communities around the university. The projects are long-term in nature, and would be continued by the following batches of students to perpetually benefit the communities in need.

== Achievements ==
=== Awards and recognition ===
In 2014, IIUM was ranked tenth out of 440 teams participated in the 35th World Universities Debating Championship. In 2016, IIUM won the United Asian Debating Championship, the Australasian Intervarsity Debate Championship, and the Asian British Parliamentary Championship. In 2017, IIUM was made the runner-up of World Universities Arabic Debating Championship.

In the field of research, IIUM have received recognition at regional and international level by winning gold, silver and bronze medals at exhibitions and expos, including PENCIPTA, INPEX, ITEX Geneva and KIPA. IIUM entered the inaugural Proton Green Mobility Challenge 2012 (PGMC) when the University's entry, an electric powered Proton Saga BLM named "Smart Mobility" became the overall champion and also took "Farthest Distance" and "Fastest Two Laps Challenge" award.

IIUM was involved in the creation of the Malaysian Shariah Index with collaboration from JAKIM and YADIM which Malaysia will be the first country in the world to adopt it. The index will measure the compliance of eight fields – judiciary, politics, economics, health, education, culture, infrastructure and environment, and social – with "maqasid syariah", or the intentions of Shariah. The Malaysian Shariah Index was officially launched by the Prime Minister of Malaysia on 10 February 2015.

IIUM won multiple sustainability recognitions and awards, most notably the prestigious International Green Gown Awards, for which it claims the title for having the most awards won with six awards in total. It is also the only institution to win the Sustainability Institution of the Year award twice (2020 & 2024), and the only one to sweep more than two awards within the same year back in 2024.

== Notable alumni ==
IIUM has been known to be the most influential Islamic tertiary education institute in the country as well as one of the leading Islamic universities in the Muslim world.

Notable International Islamic University Malaysia Alumni

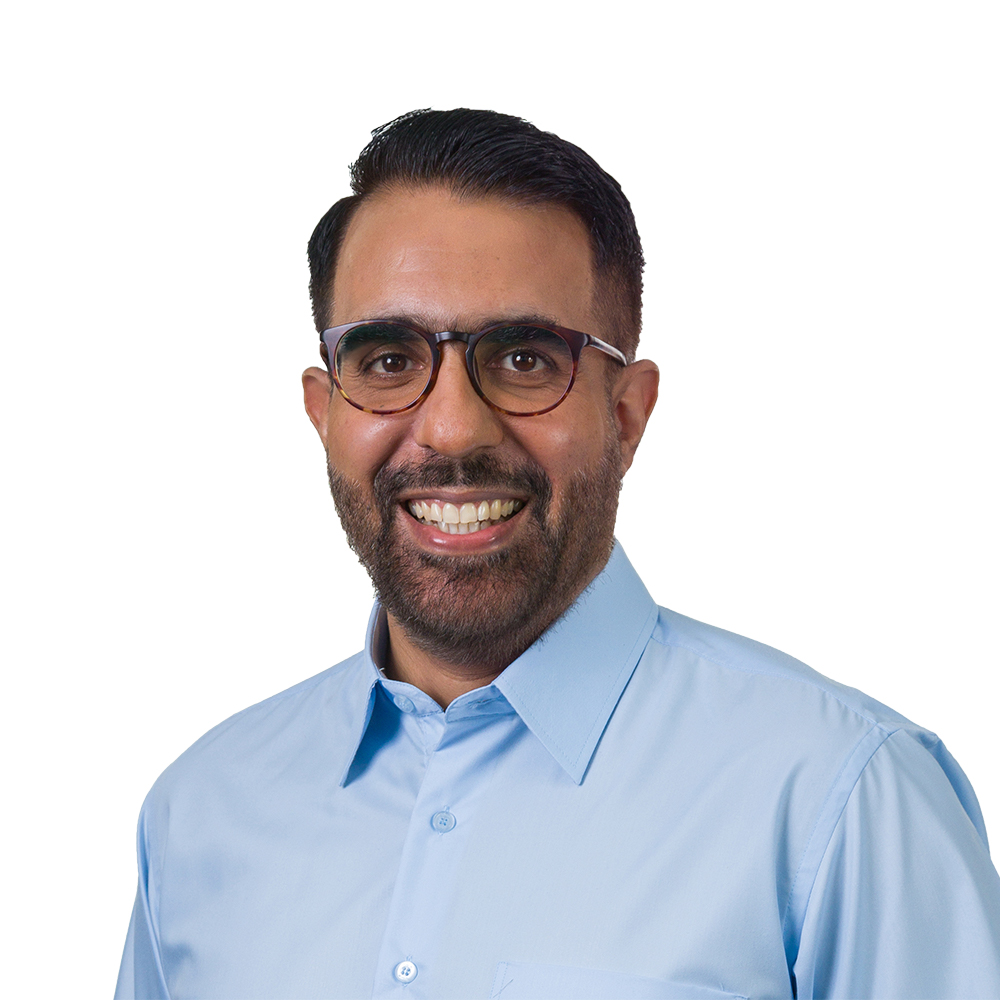
Pritam Singh, 9th Leader of the Opposition for Singapore

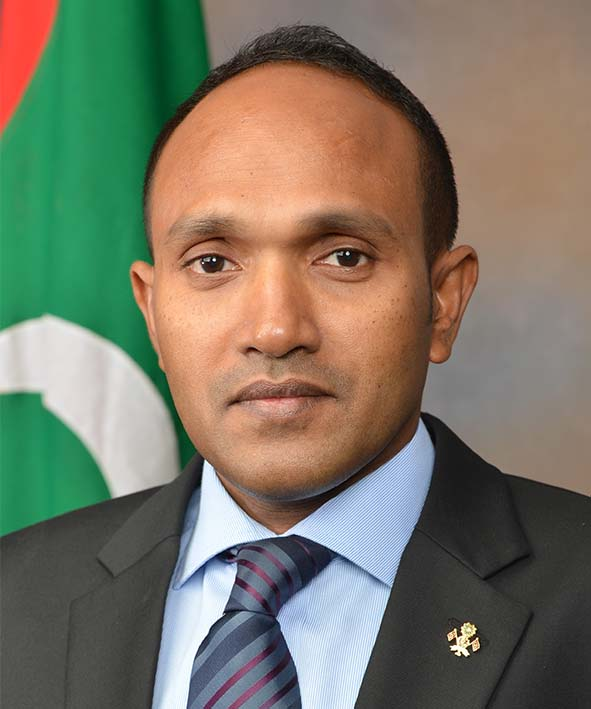
Mohamed Jameel Ahmed, Vice President of the Maldives

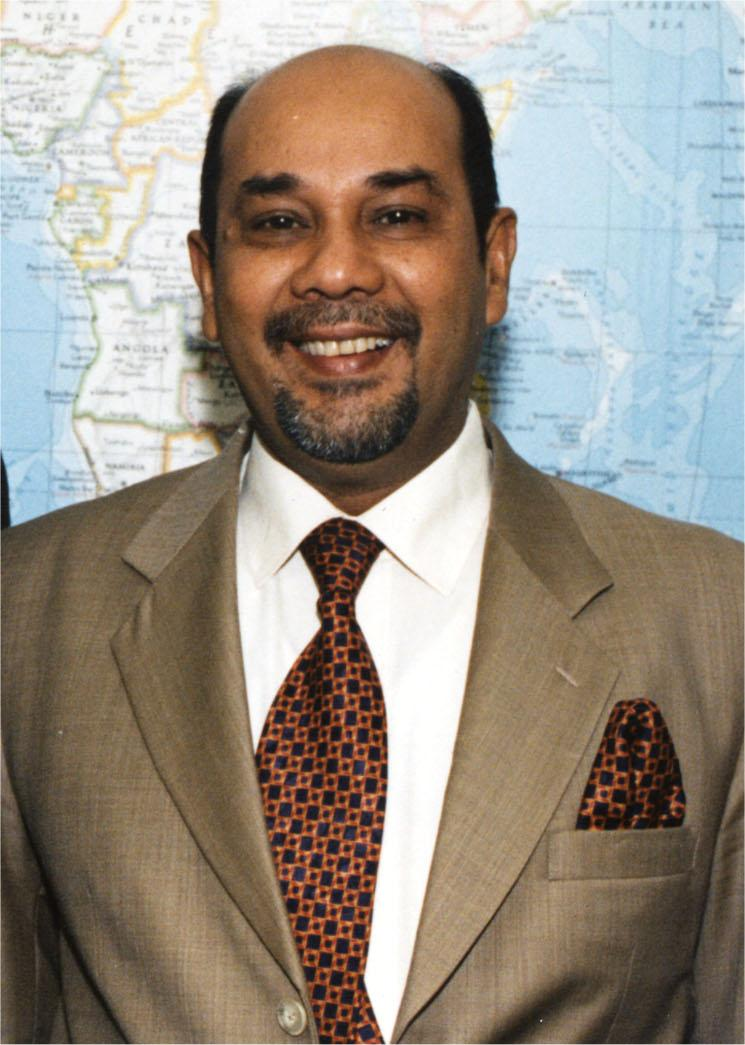
Syed Hamid Albar, Minister of Home Affairs of Malaysia

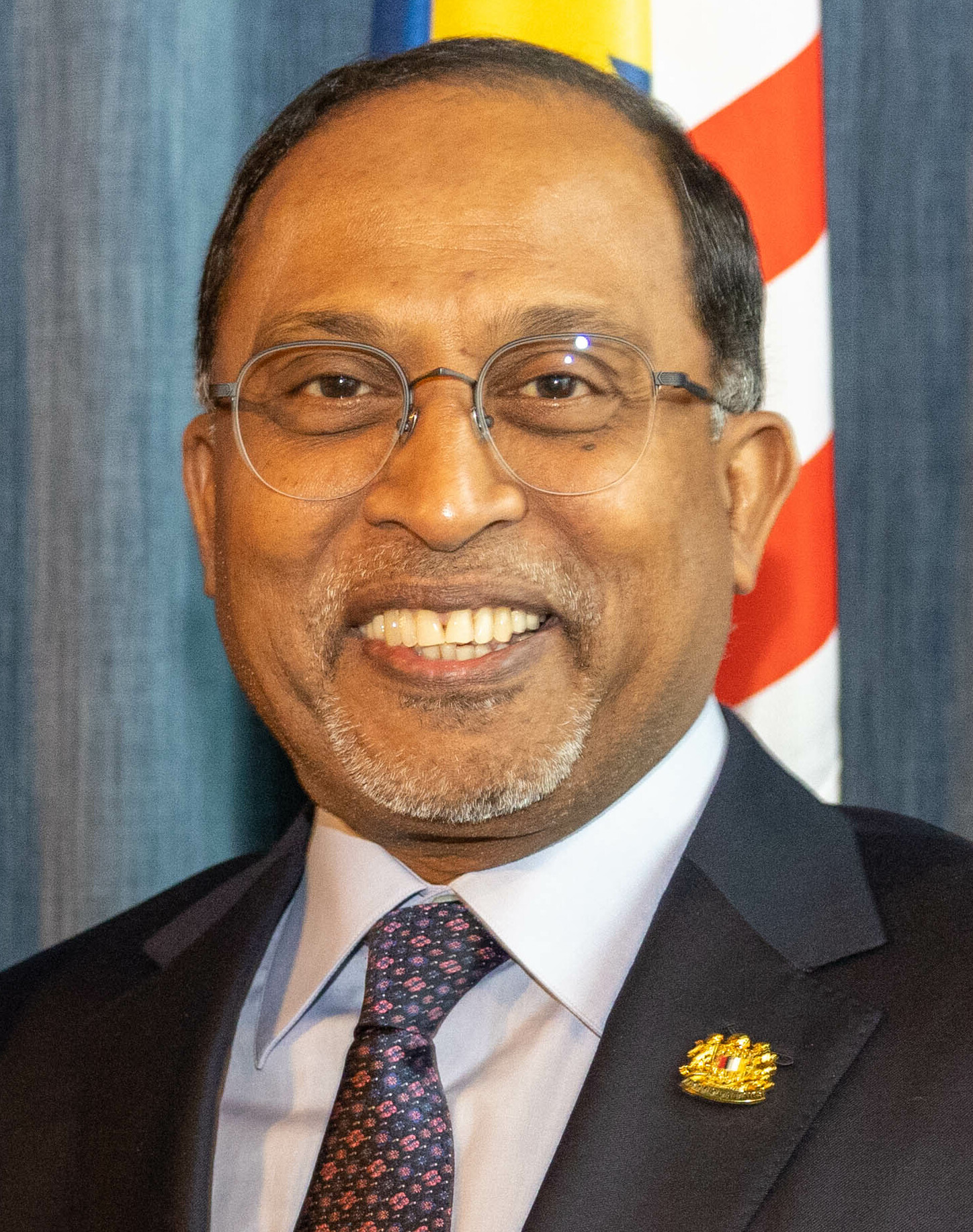
Zambry Abdul Kadir, Minister of Foreign Affairs of Malaysia

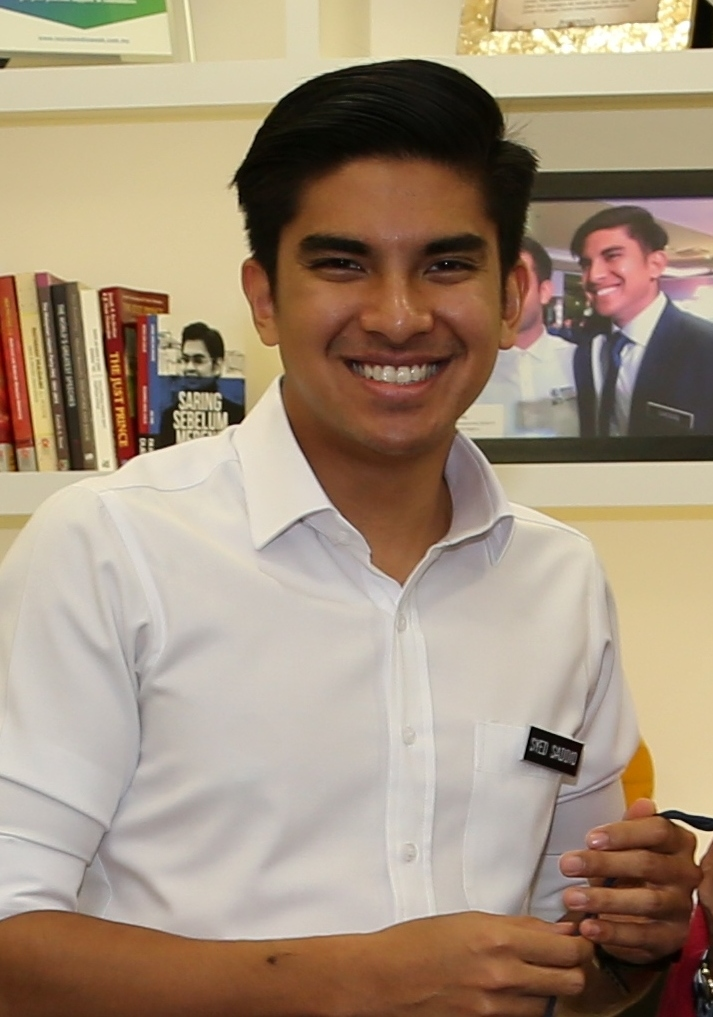
Syed Saddiq, Minister of Youth and Sports of Malaysia

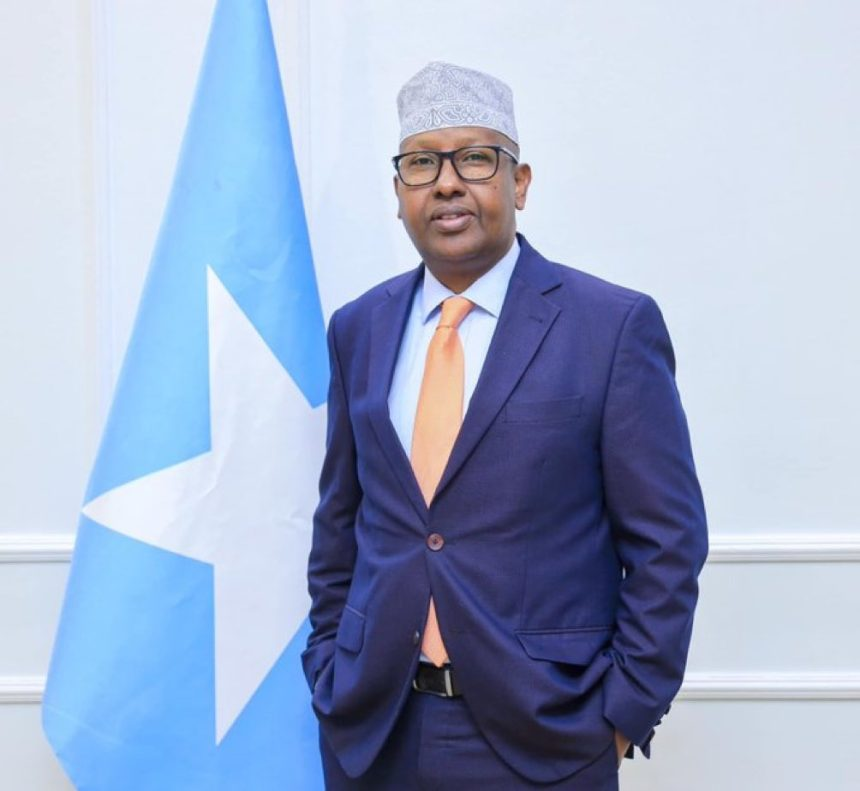
Ahmed Moalim Fiqi, Minister of Foreign Affairs of Somalia

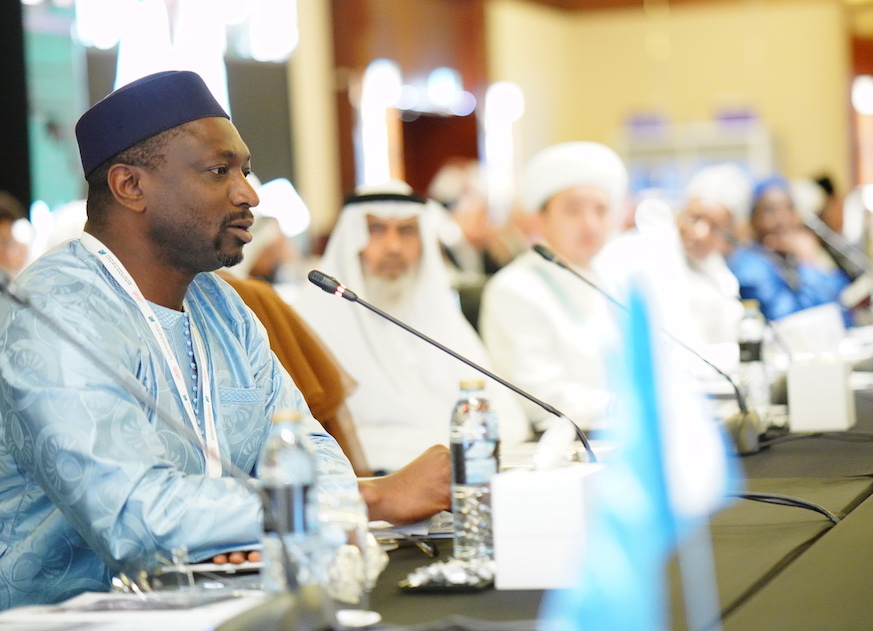
Koutoub Moustapha Sano, Minister of Religious Affairs of the Republic of Guinea

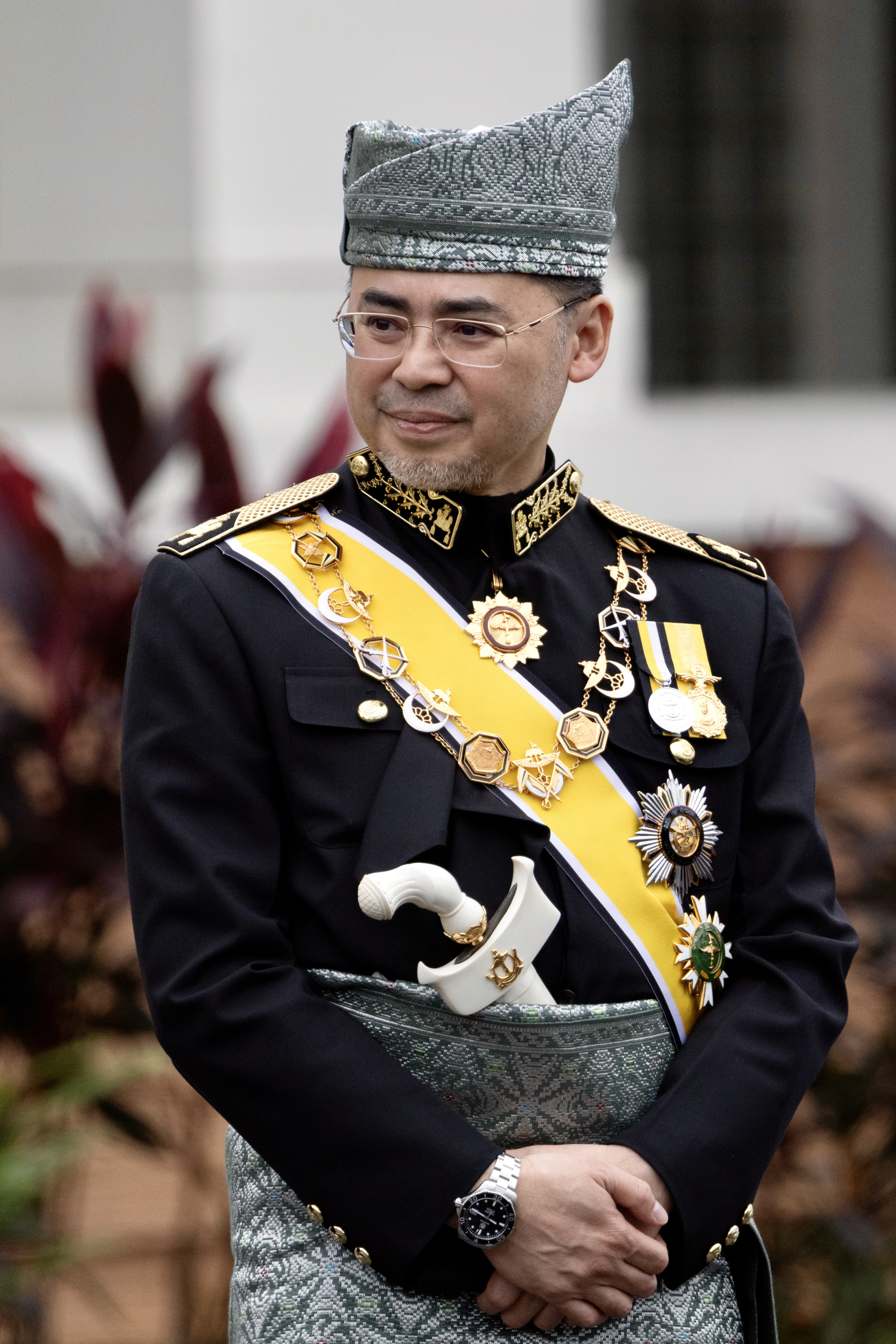
Pengiran Mohammad Tashim, Minister of Religious Affairs of Brunei

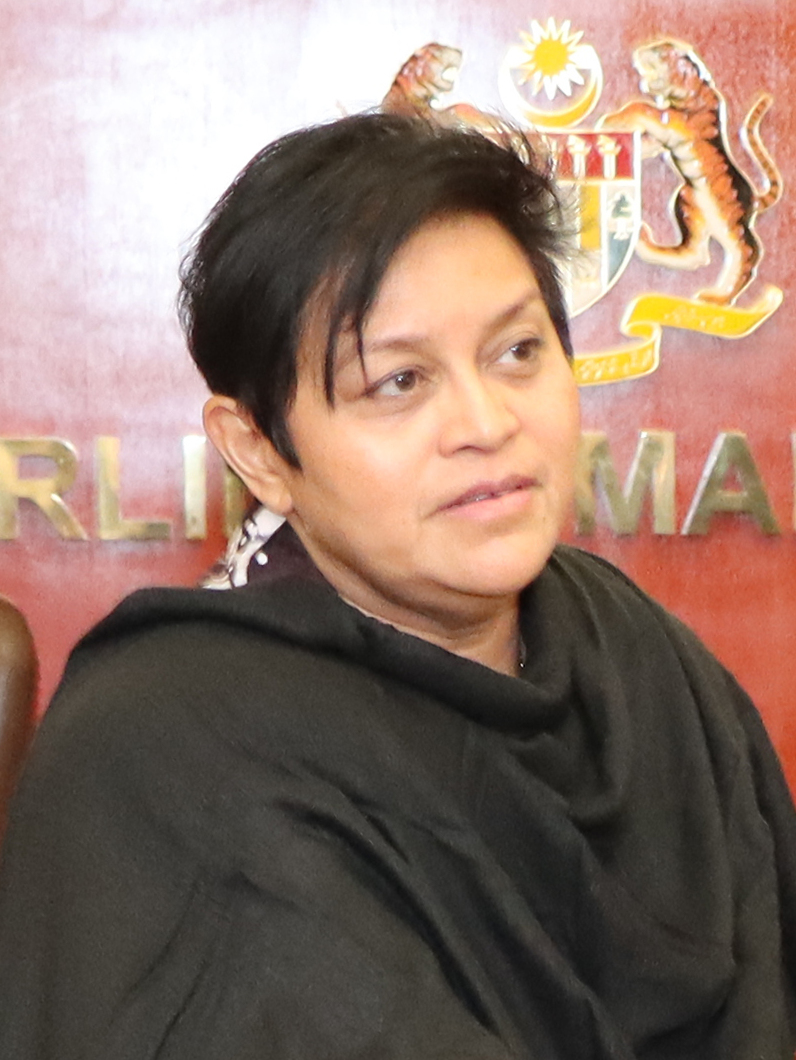
Azalina Othman Said, Minister in the Prime Minister's Department for Law and Institutional Reforms of Malaysia

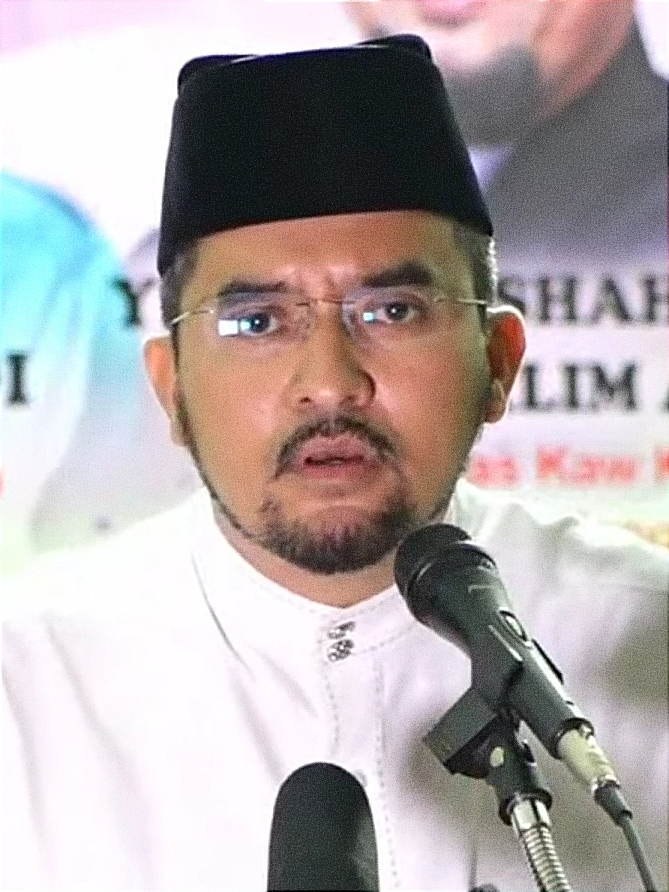
Asyraf Wajdi Dusuki, Chairman of the Majlis Amanah Rakyat

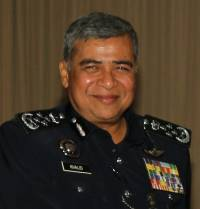
Khalid Abu Bakar, Inspector-General of the Royal Malaysian Police

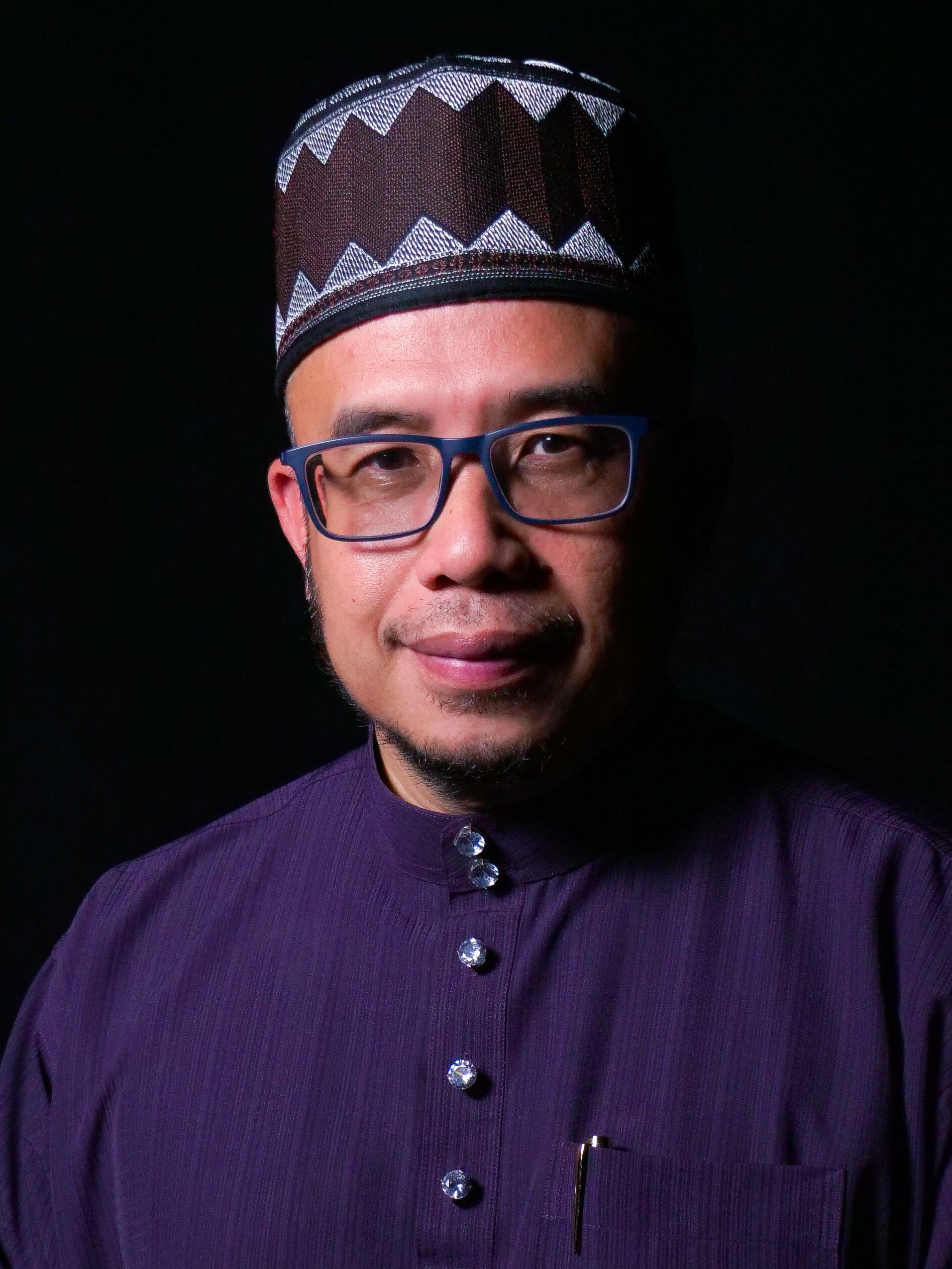
Asri Zainul Abidin, Mufti of Perlis

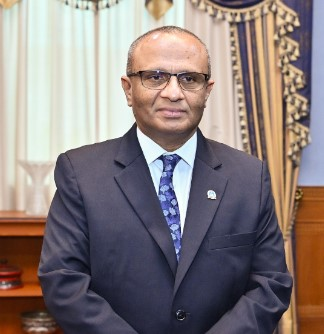
Husnu Al Suood, Attorney General and Justice of the Supreme Court of the Maldives

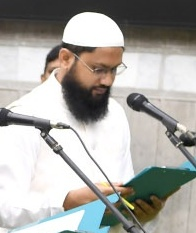
Dr. Atiqur Rahman Mujahid, Member of the Bangladeshi Parliament and Joint Convener of the National Citizen Party

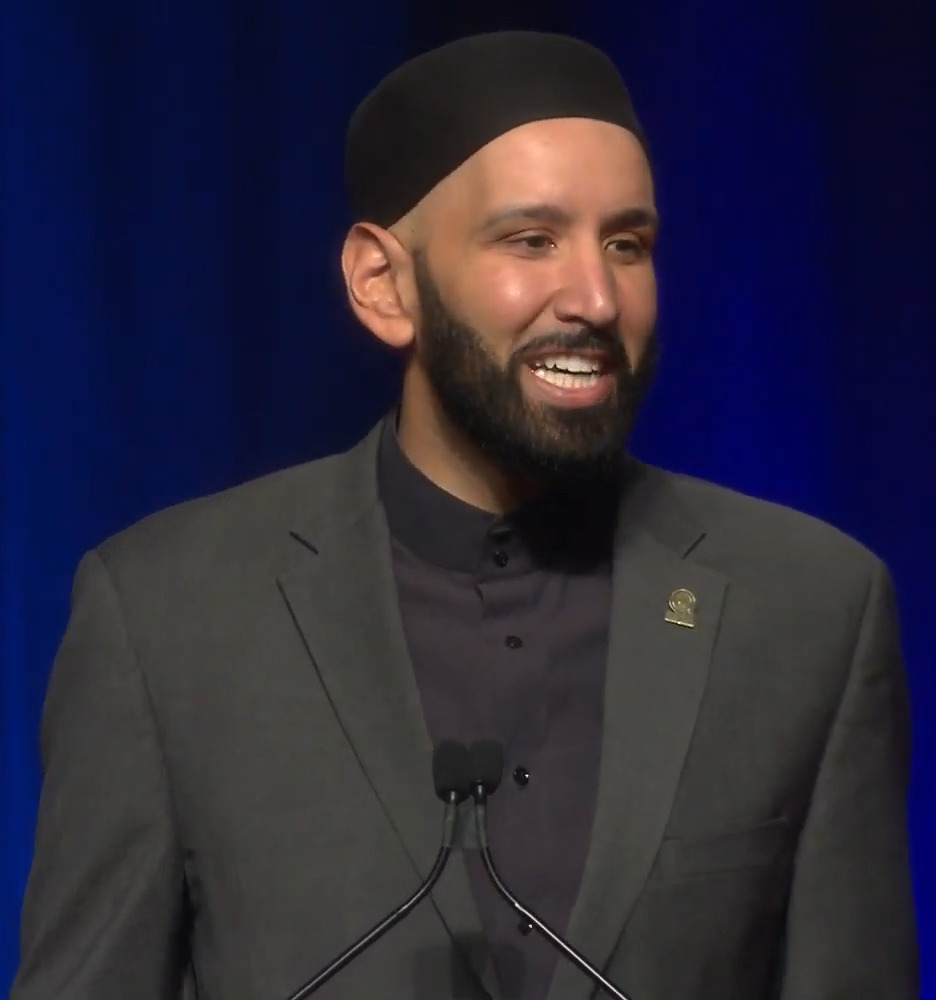
Omar Suleiman, American Muslim scholar, President of Yaqeen Institute

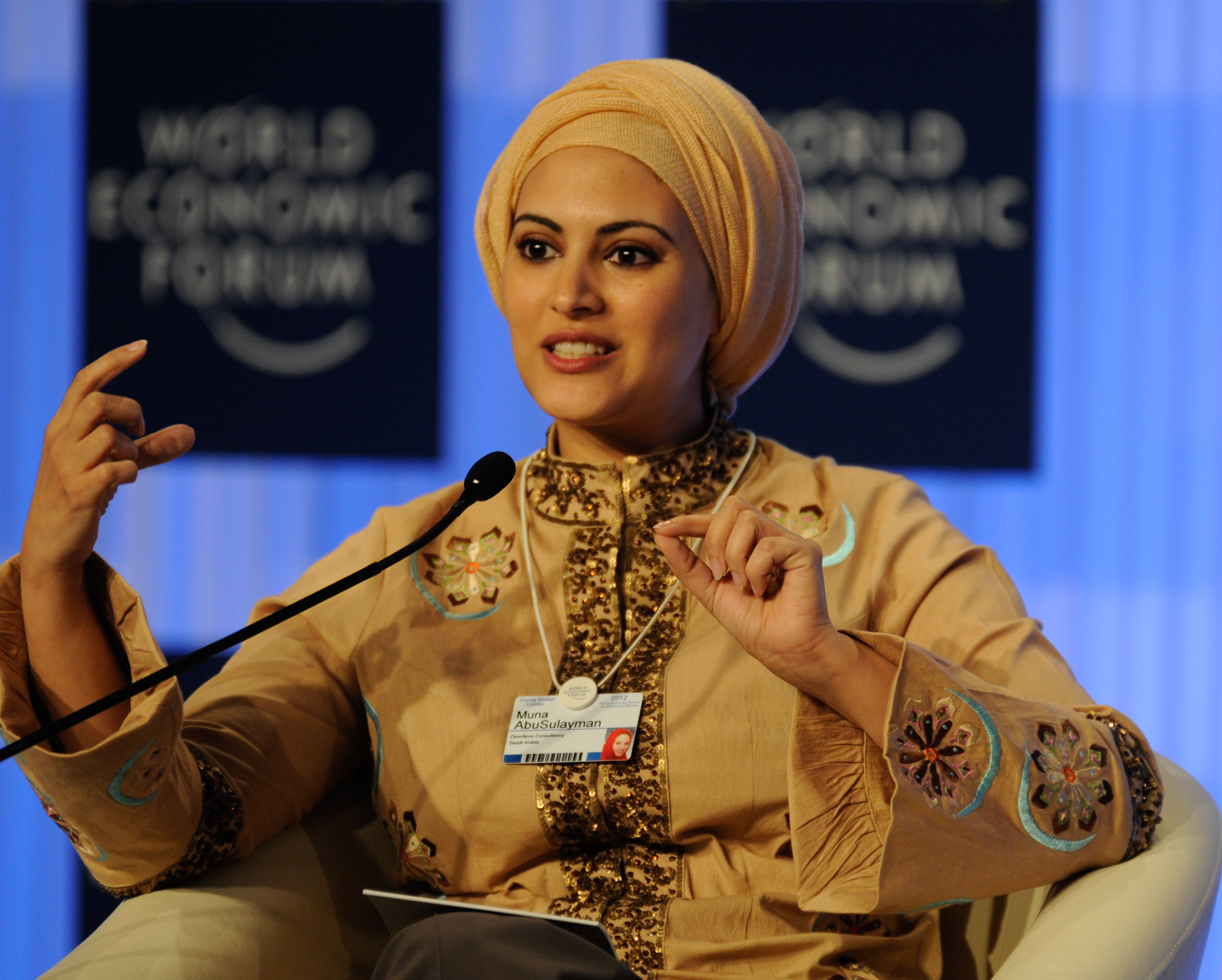
Muna AbuSulayman, Saudi businesswoman and media personality

== Notable faculty members ==
=== Current faculty members ===
- Abdul Rashid Moten, Professor of KIRKHS, political scientist
- Abdullah al-Ahsan, Professor of KIRKHS, contemporary Muslim historian
- Marzuki Mohamad, Associate Professor of KIRKHS, political scientist, and Chief Private Secretary to the 8th Prime Minister of Malaysia
- Mohamed Hanipa Maidin, Lecturer of AIKOL, MP of Sepang (federal constituency) (2013-2022), Deputy Minister in the Prime Minister's Department (Legal Affairs) (2018-2020)
- Shamrahayu Abdul Aziz, Professor of AIKOL, constitutional expert
- Solehah Yaacob, Associate Professor of KIRKHS, Arabic linguist
- Syed Arabi Syed Abdullah Idid, Senior Professor of KIRKHS, media and communication expert and Rector of IIUM (2006–2011)
- Zaleha Kamarudin, Professor of AIKOL, family law expert and Rector of IIUM (2011–2018)

=== Former faculty members ===
- Abdul Aziz Bari, lecturer and professor of AIKOL (1989–2011), MLA for Tebing Tinggi, Perak and member of Perak State Executive Council, Malaysia (since 2018)
- Abdul Hamid Ahmad Abu Sulayman, Rector of IIUM (1988–1998)
- Ahmad Mohamed Ibrahim, founding Dean of AIKOL, Attorney-General of Singapore (1959–1967)
- Ahmet Davutoğlu, lecturer of political science at KIRKHS (1993–1996), Prime Minister of Turkey (2014–2016)
- Maszlee Malik, lecturer of KIRKHS (2002–2018), MP for Simpang Renggam, President of IIUM and Minister of Education, Malaysia (2018-2020)
- Mohammad Hashim Kamali, professor of Islamic law at AIKOL and ISTAC (1985–2007), CEO of International Institute of Advanced Islamic Studies (since 2007)
- Mohd. Kamal Hassan, Rector of IIUM (1999–2006)
- Syed Muhammad Naquib al-Attas, founder of ISTAC, then visiting professor at UTM

== See also ==
- List of Islamic educational institutions
