= Marzuki Mohamad =

Malaysian academic

Yang Berbahagia Datuk Marzuki Mohamad PJN PMW

Principal Private Secretary to the Prime Minister
- In office 1 March 2020 – 21 August 2021
- Prime Minister: Muhyiddin Yassin
- Succeeded by: Nor Nazimah Hashim (Ismail Sabri)

Personal details
- Born: Marzuki bin Mohamad; 24 June 1972 (age 54) Pasir Mas, Kelantan, Malaysia
- Spouse: Haryaty Ibrahim
- Children: 5
- Parents: Mohamad Che Ibrahim (father); Rokiah Pa’chu (mother)
- Education: International Islamic University of Malaysia (LLB); National University of Malaysia (MA); Australian National University (PhD)
- Occupation: Academic

Marzuki bin Mohamad is a Malaysian political scientist and civil servant who was the former Principal Private Secretary to the 8th Prime Minister of Malaysia, Muhyiddin Yassin. He is currently an associate professor in the Department of Political Science, AbdulHamid A. AbuSulayman Kulliyyah of Islamic Revealed Knowledge and Human Sciences, International Islamic University of Malaysia (IIUM).

== Education ==
He obtained his first degree, a Bachelor of Laws, from the International Islamic University of Malaysia. Then he continued his studies at the postgraduate level at the National University of Malaysia and obtained a Master of Arts (Political Science) and finally continued his PhD studies (Political Science and International Relations) at the Australian National University, Australia.

== Career ==
Marzuki started his career as an academician, where he first lectured at International Islamic University of Malaysia in 1999. A close confidant of Muhyiddin Yassin, he started working with him as a research intern at the Center for Leadership and Development Studies (CELDES), whose duties included helping Muhyiddin when he became the Minister of Youth and Sports of Malaysia.

He was then appointed as Special Officer to the Deputy Prime Minister of Malaysia when Muhyiddin was appointed as Deputy Prime Minister in 2009. In 2013, he was then promoted as a political secretary to the Minister of Education I of Malaysia. In 2018, he was appointed as the Special Functions Officer to the Minister of Home Affairs until 2020.

After the resignation of Mahathir Mohamad on 24 February 2020, the new Prime Minister, Muhyiddin Yassin took his place and Marzuki was appointed as the Principal Private Secretary, or, in other words, the Chief of Staff to the Prime Minister of Malaysia.

After Tan Sri Muhyiddin resigned as the 8th Prime Minister and was subsequently appointed as the Chairman of the National Rehabilitation Council, Marzuki was appointed as Senior Confidential Secretary to the Chairman of the National Rehabilitation Council.

After GE15, he returned to serve as an associate professor in the Department of Political Science, International Islamic University of Malaysia.

== Personal life ==
Marzuki is a native of Pasir Mas, Kelantan, and is married to Haryaty Ibrahim, where they have 5 children.

== Honours ==
- Malaysia :
  - Commander of the Order of Meritorious Service (PJN) – Datuk (2021)
- Federal Territory (Malaysia) :
  - Commander of the Order of the Territorial Crown (PMW) – Datuk (2013)
