= Abdullah al-Ahsan =

Pakistani academic

- Born: East Pakistan
- Occupation: Academic

Academic background
- Education: PhD from University of Michigan

Academic work
- Discipline: Civilization Studies
- Institutions: International Islamic University Malaysia, Istanbul Şehir University
- Notable works: Ummah Or Nation? Identity Crisis in Contemporary Muslim Societies (1992)

Abdullah al-Ahsan is a Pakistani historian. He is a professor of Political Science and International Relations at Istanbul Şehir University. Prior to this, he was professor of Comparative History in the Department of History and Civilization, International Islamic University Malaysia. He is known for his academic work documenting the Organization of Islamic Conference and addressing crises in the post-colonial Muslim world through study of the relationship between the contemporary Western and Islamic civilizations.

== Education ==
Abdullah al-Ahsan completed his Bachelors and Masters in Pakistan from the University of Punjab and Quaid-i-Azam University in General Studies and History, respectively. He continued his studies at McGill University, Montreal, Canada, doing a Masters in Islamic Studies, and finally gained his Ph.D. in History from the University of Michigan, Ann Arbor, Michigan, United States.

== Bibliography ==
Al-Ahsan has published books, monographs and articles on the relationship between contemporary Islamic and Western civilizations with specific focus on education, politics, science and good governance. Al-Ahsan is also a regular writer on contemporary issues in the Muslim world. He is a regular contributor to opinion outlets such as Aljazeera, Turkeyagenda and the Turkish state-owned Anadolu agency, where he has written on Kashmir and democracy and human rights. His books and articles have been translated into Arabic, Bengali, Bosnian, Turkish and Urdu.

=== Books ===
- The Organization of the Islamic Conference: Introduction to an Islamic Political Institution, (1988) ISBN 978-0912463131
- Ummah or Nation: Identity Crisis in Contemporary Muslim Society, (1992) ISBN 978-0860372202
- The History Of Al-Khilafah Ar-Rashidah, (2000) ISBN 978-4395106158
- Guidance for good governance : explorations in Qur'anic, scientific and cross-cultural approaches edited by Abdullah al-Ahsan, Stephen B. Young, (June 2008) ISBN 9789833855483
- Qur'anic Guidance for Good Governance: A Contemporary Perspective, 1st ed. (2017) ISBN 978-3319578729

=== Publications ===
- Problems of Eurocentric Views of History: An Examination of Certain Elementary Views about Colonialism in the Muslim World. Al-Shajarah, 18 (1).2013. pp. 35–58.
- Civilisational conflict, renewal or transformation: potential role of the OIC. Islam and Civilisational Renewal (ICR), 4 (4). 2013. pp. 579–600.
- Dialogue of civilizations :Islamic and Western perceptions. Al-Shajarah, 16 (2). 2011. pp. 157–179.
- The Islamist challenge: between "modernization" and intimidation. Al-Shajarah, 15 (2). 2010. pp. 117–148.
- The clash of civilizations thesis and Muslims: the search for an alternative paradigm. Islamic Studies, 48 (2). 2009. pp. 189–217.
