= Dzulkefly Ahmad =

Malaysian politician

Yang Berhormat Datuk Seri Dr Dzulkefly Ahmad DGSM MP
- ذوالكفل أحمد
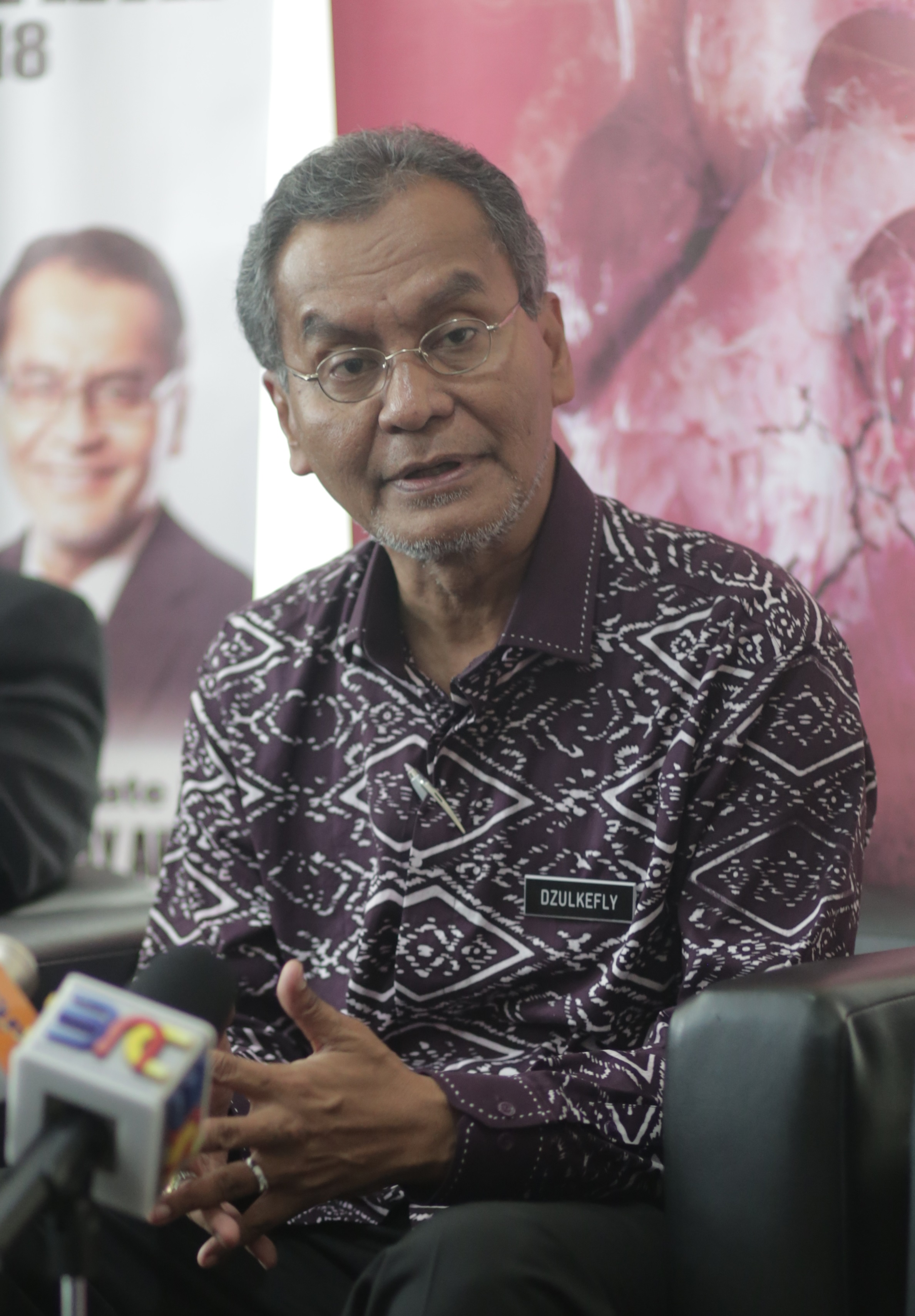

Minister of Health
- Incumbent
- Assumed office 12 December 2023
- Monarchs: Abdullah (2023–2024); Ibrahim Iskandar (since 2024)
- Prime Minister: Anwar Ibrahim
- Deputy: Lukanisman Awang Sauni (2023–2025); Hanifah Hajar Taib (since 2025)
- Preceded by: Zaliha Mustafa
- Constituency: Kuala Selangor
- In office 21 May 2018 – 24 February 2020
- Monarchs: Muhammad V (2018–2019); Abdullah (2019–2020)
- Prime Minister: Mahathir Mohamad
- Deputy: Lee Boon Chye
- Preceded by: Subramaniam Sathasivam
- Succeeded by: Adham Baba
- Constituency: Kuala Selangor

Vice President of the National Trust Party
- Incumbent
- Assumed office 24 December 2023 Serving with Siti Mariah Mahmud & Adly Zahari & Mahfuz Omar (since 2024) & Mohd Hatta Ramli (since 2024)
- President: Mohamad Sabu
- Preceded by: Mujahid Yusof Rawa & Hasanuddin Mohd Yunus

Member of the Malaysian Parliament for Kuala Selangor
- Incumbent
- Assumed office 9 May 2018
- Preceded by: Irmohizam Ibrahim (BN–UMNO)
- Majority: 8,498 (2018); 1,002 (2022)
- In office 8 March 2008 – 5 May 2013
- Preceded by: Mohd Daud Tarihep (BN–UMNO)
- Succeeded by: Irmohizam Ibrahim (BN–UMNO)
- Majority: 862 (2008)

Personal details
- Born: Dzulkefly bin Ahmad; 1 January 1956 (age 70) Rembau, Negeri Sembilan, Federation of Malaya (now Malaysia)
- Party: Malaysian Islamic Party (PAS) (until 2015); National Trust Party (AMANAH) (since 2015)
- Other political affiliations: Barisan Alternatif (BA) (1999–2004); Pakatan Rakyat (PR) (2008–2015); Pakatan Harapan (PH) (since 2015)
- Spouse: Azlin Hezri
- Children: 7
- Education: University of Birmingham; University of Surrey; Imperial College London
- Occupation: Politician
- Profession: Toxicologist, Lecturer
- Dzulkefly Ahmad on Facebook; Dzulkefly Ahmad on Parliament of Malaysia

Dzulkefly bin Ahmad (Jawi: ذوالكفل بن أحمد; born 1 January 1956) is a Malaysian politician who has served as the Minister of Health for the second term in the Unity Government administration under Prime Minister Anwar Ibrahim since December 2023 and the Member of Parliament (MP) for Kuala Selangor from March 2008 to May 2013 and again since May 2018. He served his first term as the Minister of Health in the PH administration under former Prime Minister Mahathir Mohamad from May 2018 to his resignation and the collapse of the PH administration in February 2020. He is a member of the National Trust Party (AMANAH), a component party of PH coalition and was a member of the Malaysian Islamic Party (PAS), a former component party of the former Pakatan Rakyat (PR) and Barisan Alternatif (BA) coalitions. He has also served as the Vice President of AMANAH since December 2023.

Dzulkefly had held the Kuala Selangor seat the first time from March 2008 to May 2013 as a PAS member for one term. He was one of the moderate and progressive G18 prominent members who were also referred as the "Erdogan" (after the Turkish politician Recep Tayyip Erdoğan) faction of PAS which was ousted at the 2015 PAS Muktamar. He together with other G18 leaders led by Mohamad Sabu had then launched Gerakan Harapan Baru (GHB) that eventually founded AMANAH in 2015.

== Early life ==
Dzulkefly holds a bachelor's degree from the University of Birmingham and a master's degree from the University of Surrey. He later completed his doctorate in Toxicology from the Imperial College London (St. Mary's Hospital Medical School) in 1993.

== Career ==
Dzulkefly Ahmad was a lecturer at the Faculty of Medical Sciences, Universiti Sains Malaysia (USM) in Penang (1984-1989) and HUSM, Kelantan (1993-1997). He became a lecturer of Islamic Civilization at USM (1987-1997). Dzulkefly is a former member of the British Toxicology Society (BTS) and the former Asia Pacific Association of Medical Toxicology (APAMT).

He is also the founder and Chairman of Jaiputra College Management Board, Kelantan (1999-2003), the first IPTS fully accredited by the Ministry of Education which conducts an integrated course of professionalism and religion. He is also a Consultant in an asset management company in Kuala Lumpur (1999-2001), a former Director (2003-2004) of a Public-Listed Company (PLC-Main Board). Senior Advisor of a Saudi-owned real estate company in Kuala Lumpur (2005-2007). International Education Company director, based in Oman (2017- now).

== Political thinkers and political analysts ==
Dzulkefly has been the leader of the Student Movement in the United Kingdom (1970–80s), Jamaah Islah Malaysia (JIM) 1997–1998), director of Pusat PAS Research Center (1998–2009), Central PAS Work Committee (2004–present), AJK Lujnah Central Politics (2004–2015), AJK Guides for the Clean and Fair Elections (NET, 2006–present).

He has also written and commented on current issues in the print and electronic media and presents work at national and international levels (economic development, racial relations and clash of Western-Western civilization, Political Islam etc.). Since his involvement has resulted in several books in English and Bahasa Malaysia such as Blindspot (2003), Striving For Change (2007), Pergelutan Demi Perubahan (2016) and Najibnomiks: Rahmat atau Malapetaka? (2017).

He has led the Pas Research Center and after out of PAS, the Youth of AMANAH, and later assumed the position as Strategy Director of the AMANAH. As part of PAS think tank, he has helped produced "Negara Berkebajikan" book of PAS. He also produced the "Belanjawaan Alternatif" every year and Orange Book (Buku Jingga) when in Pakatan Rakyat (PR).

Members of the Thinking Group in Pakatan Harapan who produced Alternative Belties (2017 and 2018) and the publication of the Pakatan Harapan Manifesto namely "Buku Harapan". He is also active in writing as a columnist in The Edge magazine and media portals such as Malaysiakini, The Malaysian Insight, TMI, Free Malaysia Today.

Internationally and nationally, he is often invited to share his thoughts and experiences in 'Political Islam', the socio-economic development agenda and inter-religious issues and between civilizations.

== Political career ==
=== Member of Parliament (2008–2013, since 2018) ===
Dzulkefly made his debut in the 1999 general election, contesting the Kapar parliamentary seat in Selangor for PAS but lost. In the 2004 general election, he contested the Rembau parliamentary seat in Negeri Sembilan but lost again. He was elected to Parliament in the 2008 general election, winning the seat of Kuala Selangor, which had been held by the ruling Barisan Nasional (BN) coalition.

In January 2010, Dr Dzulkefly publicly supported the controversial decision of the Malaysian High Court to allow a Catholic publication to use the term "Allah".

He lost his parliamentary seat in the 2013 general election, tallying 460 votes fewer than the Barisan Nasional candidate Irmohizam Ibrahim. Despite the loss, he was re-elected to the party's central committee. In the 2018 general election, he was re-elected again to the Parliament but as an AMANAH candidate.

=== Minister of Health (2018–2020, since 2023) ===
==== First term ====
After PH took over power from Barisan Nasional (BN), Dzulkefly was appointed to the first term as the Minister of Health by Prime Minister Mahathir to replace Subramaniam Sathasivam on 21 May 2018. Dzulkefly resigned from the position during the 2020 political crisis which also overthrew the PH government.

==== Second term ====
In a cabinet reshuffle on 12 December 2023, Dzulkefly was reappointed to a second term as the Minister of Health by Prime Minister Anwar to replace Zaliha Mustafa who was appointed as the Minister in the Prime Minister's Department in charge of Federal Territories. Anwar explained on his reappointment by adding that he needed the experience of Dzulkefly to lead and strengthen the ministry that was facing many issues. The following day, Dzulkefly apologised on the matter of Generational Endgame (GEG) bill in Dewan Negara. He also committed himself to implementing the digital health transformation agenda. On the rising cases of the COVID-19 pandemic, he assured the nation that there are enough vaccine supplies and raised the possibility of issuing new instructions on booster doses for high-risk groups as well as mandating masking again. He also made Electronic medical records (EMR), digitising healthcare, health financing reforms and upgrading dilapidated facilities his priorities during his second term in the position. Dzulkefly also reviewed guidelines on what to do when a person tests positive for COVID-19 at home, after social media users complained that the Covid-19 Assessment Centre (CAC) hotline set up during the pandemic was no longer working and called on Malaysians with severe symptoms to visit the nearest government health clinic or hospital. On 18 December 2023, Dzulkefly held the first press conference in his second term to address the pandemic, he dismissed the reintroduction of the Movement Control Order (MCO) and outlined five strategies to bring down the cases. However, his handling of the press conference attracted criticisms, Dzulkefly asked Director-General of Health to answer some questions from the reporters. Critics even called for the return of Khairy Jamaluddin to lead the ministry. His Cabinet colleague the Minister of Tourism, Arts and Culture Tiong King Sing also criticised Dzulkefly of overreacting and triggering unnecessary panic of the pandemic that negatively impacted the recovery and development of the tourism sector from the pandemic. Supporters argued that being a minister was not equal to knowing everything, praised Dzulkefly who held a press conference to report the pandemic in a transparent manner and defended Dzulkefly whom they described as doing the right thing. Dzulkefly also carried out frequent reporting of the pandemic in his early second term. Dzulkefly also expected the cases to drop in January 2024.

=== Vice President of the National Trust Party (since 2023) ===
During the AMANAH National Convention on 24 December 2023, Dzulkefly was reelected to the Central Committee for the term between 2023 and 2026 with the highest number of votes at 900 from the delegates. Dzulkefly was later appointed as a new Vice President alongside Adly Zahari and Siti Mariah Mahmud who were reappointed to the vice presidency. Dzulkefly was a favourite for the deputy presidency to replace Salahuddin Ayub who died in July 2023. However, incumbent Vice President Mujahid Yusof Rawa who was reelected with the fourth highest number of votes at 699 was promoted to the Deputy President, deputising for President Mohamad Sabu who was reappointed for his last term.

== Legal suits ==
On 31 December 2021, Dzulkefly Ahmad has filed a defamation suit against former prime minister Najib Razak following his allegations of nepotism and cronyism. Dzulkefly filed a statement of claim at Kuala Lumpur High Court, providing a 24 August 2020, Facebook post by Najib together with a Sinar Harian article dated 28 January 2019, as key evidence.

== Health ==
On 13 March 2024, Dzulkefly was rushed to the hospital in the morning after being suspected to be suffering from renal colic. He was receiving treatment and in a stable condition.

== Election results ==
Parliament of Malaysia
Year	Constituency	Candidate	Votes	Pct	Opponent(s)	Votes	Pct	Ballots cast	Majority	Turnout
1999	P099 Kapar	Dzulkefly Ahmad (PAS)	24,970	45.47%	Komala Devi M Perumal (MIC)	27,830	50.68%	56,060	2,860	75.24%
1999	P099 Kapar	Dzulkefly Ahmad (PAS)	24,970	45.47%	N. Tamilarasan @ Kim Chai (IND)	2,112	3.85%	56,060	2,860	75.24%
2004	P131 Rembau	Dzulkefly Ahmad (PAS)	10,008	25.88%	Firdaus Muhammad Rom Harun (UMNO)	28,664	74.12%	39,866	18,656	74.46%
2008	P096 Kuala Selangor	Dzulkefly Ahmad (PAS)	18,796	51.17%	Jahaya Ibrahim (UMNO)	17,934	48.83%	37,671	862	79.81%
2013	P096 Kuala Selangor	Dzulkefly Ahmad (PAS)	27,040	49.58%	Irmohizam Ibrahim (UMNO)	27,500	50.42%	55,592	460	89.24%
2018	P096 Kuala Selangor	Dzulkefly Ahmad (AMANAH)	29,842	49.97%	Irmohizam Ibrahim (UMNO)	21,344	35.74%	60,843	8,498	87.70%
2018	P096 Kuala Selangor	Dzulkefly Ahmad (AMANAH)	29,842	49.97%	Mohd Fakaruddin Ismail (PAS)	8,535	14.29%	60,843	8,498	87.70%
2022	P096 Kuala Selangor	Dzulkefly Ahmad (AMANAH)	31,033	35.88%	Tengku Zafrul Aziz (UMNO)	30,031	34.73%	86,481	1,002	84.00%
2022	P096 Kuala Selangor	Dzulkefly Ahmad (AMANAH)	31,033	35.88%	Mohd Noor Mohd Sahar (PAS)	23,639	27.33%	86,481	1,002	84.00%
2022	P096 Kuala Selangor	Dzulkefly Ahmad (AMANAH)	31,033	35.88%	Mohd Shaid Rosli (PEJUANG)	1,778	2.06%	86,481	1,002	84.00%

== Honours ==
=== Honour of Malaysia ===
- Malaysia
  - Recipient of the 16th Yang di-Pertuan Agong Installation Medal (2019)
  - Recipient of the 17th Yang di-Pertuan Agong Installation Medal (2024)
- Malacca
  - Grand Commander of the Exalted Order of Malacca (DGSM) – Datuk Seri (2018)
