= Tuan Ibrahim Tuan Man =

Malaysian politician, lecturer and teacher

Yang Berhormat Dato' Sri Tuan Ibrahim Tuan Man SSAP SJMK DIMP MP MLA
- توان إبراهيم توان من
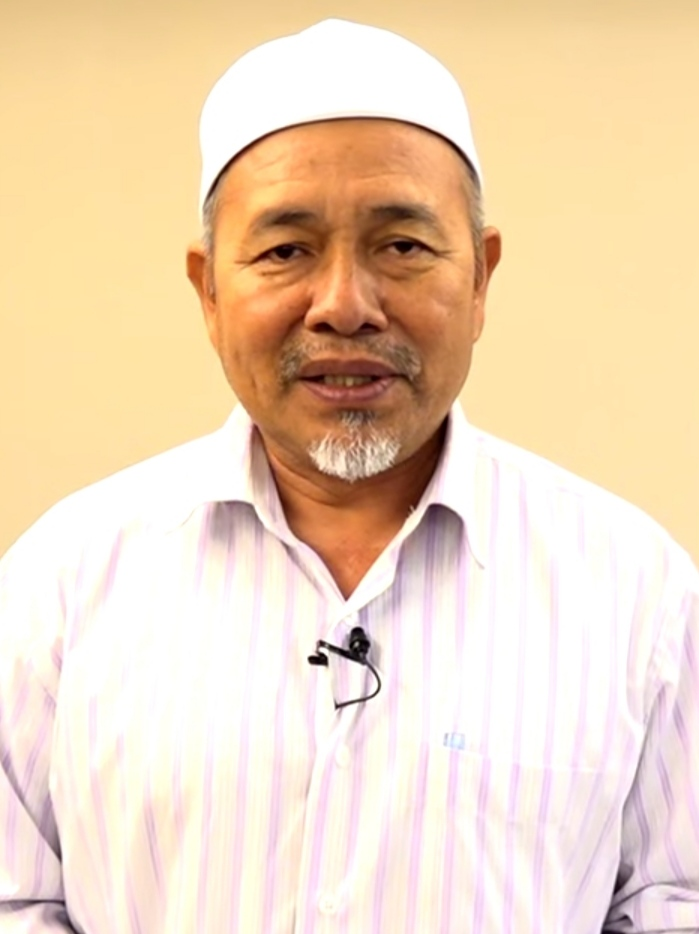

State Leader of the Opposition of Pahang
- Incumbent
- Assumed office 6 December 2022
- Monarch: Abdullah
- Menteri Besar: Wan Rosdy Wan Ismail
- Preceded by: Lee Chin Chen
- Constituency: Cheka

Minister of Environment and Water
- In office 30 August 2021 – 24 November 2022
- Monarch: Abdullah
- Prime Minister: Ismail Sabri Yaakob
- Deputy: Mansor Othman
- Preceded by: Himself
- Succeeded by: Nik Nazmi (Minister of Natural Resources, Environment and Climate Change)
- Constituency: Kubang Kerian
- In office 10 March 2020 – 16 August 2021
- Monarch: Abdullah
- Prime Minister: Muhyiddin Yassin
- Deputy: Ahmad Masrizal Muhammad
- Preceded by: Yeo Bee Yin (Minister of Energy, Science, Technology, Environment and Climate Change); Xavier Jayakumar Arulanandam (Minister of Water, Land and Natural Resources)
- Succeeded by: Himself
- Constituency: Kubang Kerian

Deputy President of the Malaysian Islamic Party
- Incumbent
- Assumed office 4 June 2015
- President: Abdul Hadi Awang
- Spiritual Leader: Haron Din (2015–2016); Hashim Jasin (since 2016)
- Preceded by: Mohamad Sabu

Member of the Malaysian Parliament for Kubang Kerian
- Incumbent
- Assumed office 9 May 2018
- Preceded by: Ahmad Baihaki Atiqullah (PAS)
- Majority: 19,369 (2018); 40,847 (2022)

Member of the Pahang State Legislative Assembly for Cheka
- Incumbent
- Assumed office 19 November 2022
- Preceded by: Lee Ah Wong (BN–MCA)
- Majority: 1,223 (2022)

Member of the Pahang State Legislative Assembly for Jengka
- In office 29 November 1999 – 21 March 2004
- Preceded by: Zainal Abidin Hassan (BN–UMNO)
- Succeeded by: Abd Rahman Ibrahim (BN–UMNO)
- Majority: 1,714 (1999)

Personal details
- Born: Tuan Ibharim bin Tuan Man; 27 August 1960 (age 66) Kampung Batu Balai, Jerantut, Pahang, Federation of Malaya (now Malaysia)
- Citizenship: Malaysia
- Party: Malaysian Islamic Party (PAS)
- Other political affiliations: Angkatan Perpaduan Ummah (APU) (1990–1996); Barisan Alternatif (BA) (1999–2004); Pakatan Rakyat (PR) (2008–2015); Gagasan Sejahtera (GS) (2016–2020); Perikatan Nasional (PN) (since 2020)
- Spouse: Norrul Ain Md Hashim
- Relations: Nik Abdul Aziz Nik Mat (Maternal uncle); Nik Mohamad Abduh (First cousin)
- Education: National University of Malaysia (BA, MA)
- Occupation: Politician
- Profession: Lecturer; Teacher
- Tuan Ibrahim Tuan Man on Parliament of Malaysia

Tuan Ibrahim bin Tuan Man (Jawi: توان إبراهيم بن توان من; born 27 August 1960) is a Malaysian politician, lecturer and teacher who has served as the State Leader of the Opposition of Pahang since December 2022, Member of Parliament (MP) for Kubang Kerian since May 2018 and Member of the Pahang State Legislative Assembly (MLA) for Cheka since November 2022. He served as the Minister of Environment and Water for the second term in the Barisan Nasional (BN) administration under former Prime Minister Ismail Sabri Yaakob from August 2021 to the collapse of the BN administration in November 2022 and the first term in the Perikatan Nasional (PN) administration under former Prime Minister Muhyiddin Yassin from March 2020 to the collapse of the PN administration in August 2021 as well as the MLA for Jengka from November 1999 to March 2004. He is a member of the Malaysian Islamic Party (PAS), a component party of PN coalition. He has also served as the Deputy President of PAS since June 2015.

== Early life ==
Tuan Ibrahim was born on 27 August 1960 in Kampung Batu Balai, Jerantut, Pahang to ethnic Kelantanese Malay parents. He then furthered his undergraduate studies at the National University of Malaysia and received a Bachelor of Arts (Honors) Degree in Leadership. He later went on to study his postgraduate studies at the same university and graduated in 1995. His undergraduate thesis is entitled Travel Implications for Muslims - A Study in Tioman Island. He emphasized the three benefits of his research, in terms of land, in terms of benefit to the people and in terms of Islamic morality. He has served as a teacher at Sekolah Menengah Kebangsaan (SMK) Clifford in Kuala Lipis and served as a senior lecturer for 14 years at the University of Technology MARA (UiTM) in Jengka, Pahang and Manjung, Perak.

== Political career ==
Tuan Ibrahim is an alim (Islamic religious scholar). He contested and won the Pahang State Legislative Assembly seat of Jengka in the 1999 election. However, in the 2004 election, he was unseated amid a nationwide swing to the Barisan Nasional coalition. He tried to reclaim the seat in the 2008 and 2013 elections, but lost on each occasion to a Barisan Nasional candidate. In 2013 he was elected as a Vice President of PAS, defeating Mahfuz Omar in an election at the party's annual general assembly. He has been the head of the party in the state of Pahang since 2004.

In 2018, Tuan Ibrahim was elected as the MP of Kubang Kerian constituency in the 14th Malaysian general election. and adding Cheka in pahang state election in making him first person are winning constituencies in two states at the same time

== Controversies ==
In April 2021, the media report titled Malaysia is not impacted by climate change, says the minister, in which Tuan Ibrahim is the Minister of Environment and Water, has caused anger online. Tuan Ibrahim said that the headline is misleading and clarified Malaysia is not invited to the Leaders Summit on Climate in the United States because it is not classified as a country that is highly vulnerable to the impacts of climate change.

In November 2021, Tuan Ibrahim made the local headlines when he delivered his speech in Malay during the 2021 United Nations Climate Change Conference in Glasgow. Some criticized him with the assumptions that he was not able to speak English fluently while others including politician from the opposition block coming to his defense and praised him for dignifying the national language.

Tuan Ibrahim also supports polygamy, calling for men who marry more than one woman to be given moral support as the solution for late marriages.

== Election results ==
Parliament of Malaysia
Year	Constituency	Candidate	Votes	Pct	Opponent(s)	Votes	Pct	Ballots cast	Majority	Turnout
2004	P086 Maran	Tuan Ibrahim Tuan Man (PAS)	8,483	35.04%	Ismail Abdul Muttalib (UMNO)	15,725	64.96%	24,910	7,242	78.19%
2018	P024 Kubang Kerian	Tuan Ibrahim Tuan Man (PAS)	35,620	56.16%	Muhammad Abdul Ghani (UMNO)	16,251	25.62%	84,867	19,369	79.09%
2018	P024 Kubang Kerian	Tuan Ibrahim Tuan Man (PAS)	35,620	56.16%	Abdul Halim Yusof (AMANAH)	11,557	18.22%	84,867	19,369	79.09%
2022	P024 Kubang Kerian	Tuan Ibrahim Tuan Man (PAS)	55,654	68.38%	Nurul Amal Mohd Fauzi (UMNO)	14,807	18.19%	81,384	40,847	71.62%
2022	P024 Kubang Kerian	Tuan Ibrahim Tuan Man (PAS)	55,654	68.38%	Wan Ahmad Kamil Wan Abdullah (AMANAH)	10,236	12.58%	81,384	40,847	71.62%
2022	P024 Kubang Kerian	Tuan Ibrahim Tuan Man (PAS)	55,654	68.38%	Mohd Rizal Razali (PEJUANG)	687	0.84%	81,384	40,847	71.62%

Pahang State Legislative Assembly
Year	Constituency	Candidate	Votes	Pct	Opponent(s)	Votes	Pct	Ballots cast	Majority	Turnout
1999	N23 Jengka	Tuan Ibrahim Tuan Man (PAS)	5,338	50.47%	Zainal Hassan (UMNO)	5,019	47.46%	10,576	319	83.24%
2004	N29 Jengka	Tuan Ibrahim Tuan Man (PAS)	5,532	42.74%	Abd Rahman Ibrahim (UMNO)	8,320	64.28%	12,943	1,714	82.82%
2008	N29 Jengka	Tuan Ibrahim Tuan Man (PAS)	6,858	47.34%	Wan Salman Wan Ismail (UMNO)	7,454	51.45%	14,487	596	82.55%
2013	N29 Jengka	Tuan Ibrahim Tuan Man (PAS)	9,150	46.00%	Wan Salman Wan Ismail (UMNO)	10,453	52.55%	19,890	1,303	88.50%
2022	N04 Cheka	Tuan Ibrahim Tuan Man (PAS)	5,634	45.51%	Ho Fong Mee (MCA)	4,411	35.63%	12,381	1,223	73.60%
2022	N04 Cheka	Tuan Ibrahim Tuan Man (PAS)	5,634	45.51%	Rasid Muhamad (PKR)	2,255	18.21%	12,381	1,223	73.60%
2022	N04 Cheka	Tuan Ibrahim Tuan Man (PAS)	5,634	45.51%	Aishaton Abu Bakar (PEJUANG)	81	0.65%	12,381	1,223	73.60%

== Honours ==
=== Honours of Malaysia ===
- Malaysia
  - Recipient of the 17th Yang di-Pertuan Agong Installation Medal (2024)
- Kelantan
  - Knight Grand Commander of the Order of the Life of the Crown of Kelantan (SJMK) – Dato' (2022)
- Pahang
  - Knight Grand Companion of the Order of Sultan Ahmad Shah of Pahang (SSAP) – Dato' Sri (2020)
  - Knight Companion of the Order of the Crown of Pahang (DIMP) – Dato' (1998)

== See also ==
- Kubang Kerian (federal constituency)
