= Mujahid Yusof Rawa =

Malaysian politician

Yang Berhormat Senator Datuk Seri Dr. Mujahid Yusof Rawa DGSM DSPN
- مجاهد يوسف راوا
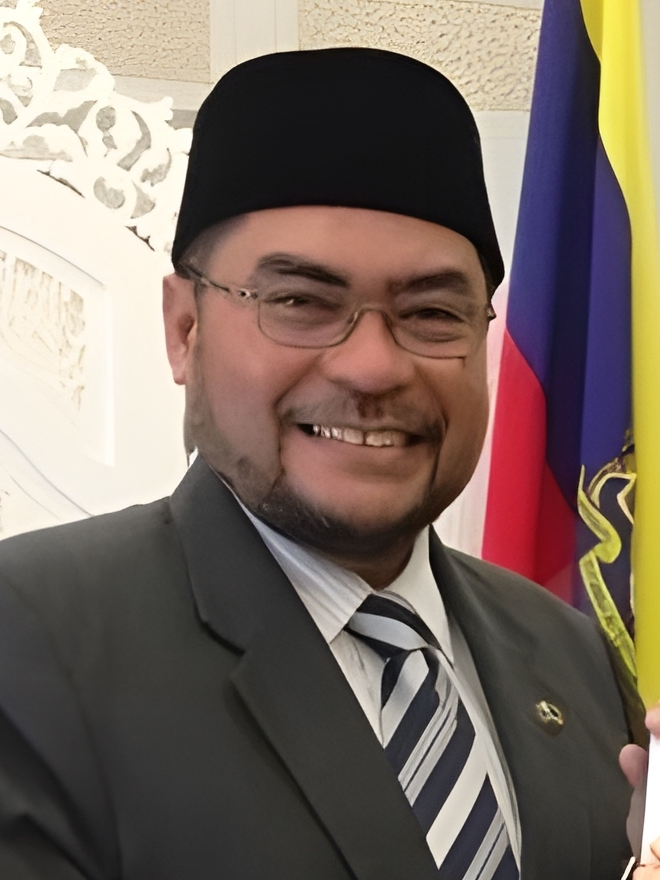

Minister in the Prime Minister's Department (Religious Affairs)
- In office 2 July 2018 – 24 February 2020
- Monarchs: Muhammad V (2018–2019); Abdullah (2019–2020)
- Prime Minister: Mahathir Mohamad
- Deputy: Fuziah Salleh
- Preceded by: Jamil Khir Baharom
- Succeeded by: Zulkifli Mohamad Al-Bakri
- Constituency: Parit Buntar

Senator Elected by the Perak State Legislative Assembly
- Incumbent
- Assumed office 25 May 2023 Serving with Shamsuddin Abd Ghaffar
- Monarchs: Abdullah (2023–2024); Ibrahim (since 2024)
- Prime Minister: Anwar Ibrahim
- Preceded by: Iskandar Dzulkarnain Abdul Khalid

2nd Deputy President of the National Trust Party
- Incumbent
- Assumed office 24 December 2023
- President: Mohamad Sabu
- Preceded by: Salahuddin Ayub

Vice President of the National Trust Party
- In office 5 September 2021 – 24 December 2023 Serving with Hasanuddin Mohd Yunus & Mahfuz Omar & Siti Mariah Mahmud & Adly Zahari
- President: Mohamad Sabu
- Succeeded by: Dzulkefly Ahmad

State Chairman of Pakatan Harapan of Perak
- Incumbent
- Assumed office 1 June 2021
- National Chairman: Anwar Ibrahim
- Preceded by: Ahmad Faizal Azumu

Member of the Malaysian Parliament for Parit Buntar
- In office 8 March 2008 – 19 November 2022
- Preceded by: Abdul Hamid Zainal Abidin (BN–UMNO)
- Succeeded by: Mohd Misbahul Munir Masduki (PN–PAS)
- Majority: 7,551 (2008); 8,476 (2013); 3,098 (2018)

Faction represented in Dewan Negara
- 2023–: Pakatan Harapan

Faction represented in Dewan Rakyat
- 2008–2015: Malaysian Islamic Party
- 2015–2018: National Trust Party
- 2018–2022: Pakatan Harapan

Personal details
- Born: Mujahid bin Yusof Rawa; 25 October 1964 (age 62) Georgetown, Penang, Malaysia
- Citizenship: Malaysia
- Party: Malaysian Islamic Party (PAS) (until 2015); National Trust Party (AMANAH) (since 2015)
- Other political affiliations: Barisan Alternatif (BA) (1999–2004); Pakatan Rakyat (PR) (2008–2015); Pakatan Harapan (PH) (since 2015)
- Spouse: Zuraida Husin
- Parent: Yusof Rawa (died 2000)
- Education: University of Malaya; University Putra Malaysia; Al-Azhar University
- Occupation: Politician
- Mujahid Yusof Rawa on Facebook; Mujahid Yusof Rawa on Parliament of Malaysia

Mujahid bin Yusof Rawa (Jawi: مجاهد بن يوسف; born 25 October 1964), commonly known as Mujahid Yusof Rawa, is a Malaysian politician who has served as Senator since May 2023. He served as the Minister in the Prime Minister's Department in charge of Religious Affairs in the Pakatan Harapan (PH) administration under former Prime Minister Mahathir Mohamad from July 2018 to the collapse of the PH administration in February 2020 as well as the Member of Parliament (MP) for Parit Buntar from March 2008 to November 2022. He is a member of the National Trust Party (AMANAH), a component party of the PH coalition and was a member of the Malaysian Islamic Party (PAS), a former component party of the Pakatan Rakyat (PR) coalition. He has also served as the 2nd Deputy President of AMANAH since December 2023 and State Chairman of PH of Perak since June 2021.

Mujahid is the son of former president of PAS, Yusof Rawa and has a PhD in political science. Rawa being a progressive party leader has spoken of transforming PAS, an Islamic party, into a multi-racial party. But he together with a few other progressive leaders referred to as G18 was ousted at the 2015 PAS Muktamar and has launched Gerakan Harapan Baru (GHB) that founded the new AMANAH party later in 2015.

Mujahid made his debut contesting the parliamentary seat of Jasin, Malacca in the 1999 general election but lost. In the 2004 general election he stood but was defeated for the Tasek Gelugor constituency in Penang.

Mujahid was elected to Parliament in the 2008 general election, winning the seat of Parit Buntar in Perak. During the 2013 general election, he won and was reelected as the candidate of PAS of the Pakatan Rakyat (PR) opposition coalition. In 2018 general election, he retained the seat as AMANAH candidate with Pakatan Harapan coalition. Subsequently, on 2 July 2018, he was appointed Minister in the Prime Minister's Department for Religious Affairs.

In 2019, he was criticised by Western media for his support for Xinjiang anti-extremism policies. On 26 June 2019, on a 7-day visit to Xinjiang as Malaysia's Religious Affairs Minister, he confirmed in a Facebook post that the camps were indeed vocational and training institutions. The next day, on 27 June, he made a speech at the Beijing Foreign Studies University in which he said "false news in China about Muslims being oppressed could trigger a wave of sympathy to the oppressed and affect relationships".

== Election results ==
Parliament of Malaysia
Year	Constituency	Candidate	Votes	Pct	Opponent(s)	Votes	Pct	Ballots cast	Majority	Turnout
1999	P124 Jasin	Mujahid Yusof Rawa (PAS)	12,947	35.39%	Abu Zahar Ithnin (UMNO)	23,638	64.61%	37,467	10,691	77.78%
2004	P042 Tasek Gelugor	Mujahid Yusof Rawa (PAS)	11,828	34.95%	Mohd Shariff Omar (UMNO)	22,011	65.05%	34,551	10,183	83.03%
2008	P057 Parit Buntar	Mujahid Yusof Rawa (PAS)	21,221	60.82%	Abd Raman Suliman (UMNO)	13,670	39.18%	35,592	7,551	78.71%
2013	P057 Parit Buntar	Mujahid Yusof Rawa (PAS)	26,015	59.73%	Muaamar Ghadafi Jamal Jamaludin (UMNO)	17,539	40.27%	44,306	8,476	86.16%
2018	P057 Parit Buntar	Mujahid Yusof Rawa (AMANAH)	16,753	38.73%	Abd Puhat Mat Nayan (UMNO)	13,655	31.56%	43,256	3,098	83.6%
2018	P057 Parit Buntar	Mujahid Yusof Rawa (AMANAH)	16,753	38.73%	Ahmad Azhar Sharin (PAS)	12,312	28.46%	43,256	3,098	83.6%
2022	P057 Parit Buntar	Mujahid Yusof Rawa (AMANAH)	17,828	33.70%	Mohd Misbahul Munir Masduki (PAS)	23,223	43.90%	52,903	5,359	77.23%
2022	P057 Parit Buntar	Mujahid Yusof Rawa (AMANAH)	17,828	33.70%	Imran Mohd Yusof (UMNO)	11,593	21.91%	52,903	5,359	77.23%
2022	P057 Parit Buntar	Mujahid Yusof Rawa (AMANAH)	17,828	33.70%	Rohijas Md Sharif (PEJUANG)	259	0.49%	52,903	5,359	77.23%

== Honours ==
- Malaysia
  - Recipient of the 16th Yang di-Pertuan Agong Installation Medal (2019)
  - Recipient of the 17th Yang di-Pertuan Agong Installation Medal (2024)
- Malacca
  - Grand Commander of the Exalted Order of Malacca (DGSM) – Datuk Seri (2018)
- Penang
  - Officer of the Order of the Defender of State (DSPN) – Dato' (2012)

== See also ==
- Members of the Dewan Negara, 15th Malaysian Parliament
- List of people who have served in both Houses of the Malaysian Parliament
