= Ahmad Awang =

Malaysian politician

Yang Berbahagia Datuk Seri Ustaz Ahmad Awang DGSM DPMP
- أحمد أواڠ

General Advisor of National Trust Party
- Incumbent
- Assumed office 2015
- Deputy: Abdul Ghani Samsudin
- Preceded by: Position establish

7th Commissioner of PAS Perak
- In office 2003–2009
- Preceded by: Sabran Asmawi
- Succeeded by: Abu Bakar Hussian

Yang Dipertua Persatuan Ulama Malaysia
- In office 1981–1999
- Preceded by: Nik Mohd Mohyiddeen Wan Musa
- Succeeded by: Abdul Ghani Samsudin

Personal details
- Born: 21 February 1936 (age 90) Gunung Semanggol, Perak, Federated Malay States (now Malaysia)
- Citizenship: Malaysian
- Party: Malaysian Islamic Party (PAS) (1984–2015); National Trust Party (AMANAH) (since 2015)
- Other political affiliations: Angkatan Perpaduan Ummah (APU) (1990–1996); Barisan Alternatif (BA) (1998–2004); Pakatan Rakyat (PR) (2008–2015); Pakatan Harapan (PH) (since 2015); Barisan Nasional (BN) (aligned:since 2022)
- Occupation: Politician
- Profession: Religious Teacher
- Website: usahmadawang.blogspot.com

Ahmad bin Awang is a Malaysian politician and religious leader from the National Trust Party (AMANAH), a component party of Pakatan Harapan (PH). He was a member of the Pan-Malaysian Islamic Party (PAS), then a component party of the Barisan Alternatif (BA) and Pakatan Rakyat (PR) opposition coalitions, before leaving the party after being defeated in the 2015 PAS Muktamar. At the party level, he is the current General Advisor of the National Trust Party.

== Education ==
After four years of studying in a Malay school, he started religious studies at Maahad Al-Ehya Al Shariff, Gunung Semanggol starting from primary level up to upper secondary level (Thanawi Rabi'). At the time, this school was not only famous as an educational center, but also as an institution of the Islamic movement in the struggle for independence which was feared by British colonialists. Many of the freedom fighters who were arrested by the British colonialists were graduates of this institution.

Ahmad Awang would go on to complete his higher education at Malayan Islamic College. Soon after, he continued his studies in the field of Islamic law at Al-Azhar University, Egypt. He then obtained a Master's Degree in addition to a Diploma in Education from the same university.

Ahmad Awang began his service in the field of education as a teacher of religion at St. David's High School, Malacca before continuing his education at Egypt in 1963 with a Ministry of Education scholarship. After graduating from Al-Azhar University, Ahmad Awang soon worked again as a teacher at SMK Aminuddin Baki, Kuala Lumpur. He would go on to serve at the Ministry of National and Rural Development as an Adult Religious Planning Officer. Later, he worked as a lecturer in Islamic education at Universiti Teknologi Malaysia, Kuala Lumpur.

When the Religion Division in the Prime Minister's Department (JPM) was established in 1974, he was appointed as the Director of Dakwah and Islamic Training, after which he was transferred to the Ministry of Education in 1980 and returned to the JPM's Religion Division, now known as JAKIM, as the Director of Da'wah and Islamic Training and finally became the Director of the Islamic Research Center until his retirement in 1991.

== Organization ==
In addition to carrying out official duties in government service, Ahmad Awang actively participates in and leads NGO organizations in various fields, especially in the field of preaching and education. Among them, he led the leadership of Persatuan Ulama Malaysia for about 17 years, and the Selangor and Federal Territories Islamic Appeal Federation for over 20 years. Other organizations that he has led are the Middle East Islamic Former Students Association, the Maahad Al-Ehya' Ash-Shariff Gunung Semanggol Former Students Association and the Malayan Islamic College Student Association.

He has also been Shariah Panel Chairman of Malaysia Development Bank, Deputy Chairman of the Shariah Panel at RHB Bank, and a member of the Shariah Panel of several other financial institutions. At the international level, he has been appointed as a member of the World Islamic Da'wah General Conference at Libya, a senate member of the University of Baghdad, Iraq and a member of the Islamic Assembly Conference of the Islamic Republic of Iran.

== Political involvement ==
=== Pan-Malaysian Islamic Party (PAS) ===
Ahmad Awang's involvement in politics began in 1984 when he joined the Pan-Malaysian Islamic Party (PAS). He became active after becoming a member of the Central PAS Committee and Deputy Commissioner of PAS Perak in 1999, during the Reformasi movement initiated by Anwar Ibrahim.

Ahmad Awang ran as a PAS candidate for the Bagan Serai constituency in the 10th GE but lost to Datuk Zainal Abidin Zin. In the 11th GE, he again lost in contesting the same constituency in addition to the Selinsing state constituency.

In 2015, he ran in the PAS Muktamar that was held in Kuala Selangor for the position of party president, leading the progressive faction of the party that had been at crossroads with the conservative faction. He challenged incumbent Abdul Hadi Awang who had held the position since 2002. However, on 4 June 2015, Ustaz Ahmad Awang lost the election, obtaining just 233 votes to the incumbent who won 928 votes. A total of 1,165 delegates voted, though the total number of ballot papers that were returned was 1,141.

=== National Trust Party (AMANAH) ===
After Ahmad Awang and other progressive PAS leaders (referred to as the G18) were defeated at the 2015 PAS Muktamar, they left the party and launched the Gerakan Harapan Baru (GHB) and took over the dormant Malaysian Workers' Party (PPPM), after their attempt to form a new party called Parti Progresif Islam (PPI) was rejected by the Home Affairs Ministry. GHB was later rebranded as Parti Amanah Negara (AMANAH) with Ahmad Awang as its first General Advisor.

== Election results ==
Parliament of Malaysia
| Year | Constituency | Candidate | Votes | Pct | Opponent(s) | Votes | Pct | Ballots cast | Majority | Turnout |
|---|---|---|---|---|---|---|---|---|---|---|
| 1999 | P055 Bagan Serai | Ahmad Awang (PAS) | 13,504 | 47.23% | Zainal Abidin Zin (UMNO) | 15,088 | 52.77% | 29,507 | 1,584 | 65.73% |
| 2004 | P058 Bagan Serai | Ahmad Awang (PAS) | 14,209 | 41.75% | Zainal Abidin Zin (UMNO) | 19,827 | 58.25% | 35,076 | 5,618 | 73.47% |

Perak State Legislative Assembly
| Year | Constituency | Candidate | Votes | Pct | Opponent(s) | Votes | Pct | Ballots cast | Majority | Turnout |
|---|---|---|---|---|---|---|---|---|---|---|
| 2004 | N12 Selinsing | Ahmad Awang (PAS) | 4,711 | 40.66% | Zaili Cha (UMNO) | 6,876 | 59.34% | 11,820 | 2,165 | 73.27% |

== Awards and recognition ==
- Malacca
  - Grand Commander of the Exalted Order of Malacca (DGSM) – Datuk Seri (2018)
- Perak
  - Knight Commander of the Order of the Perak State Crown (DPMP) – Dato' (2018)
