= Salahuddin Ayub =

Malaysian politician (1961–2023)

Yang Berbahagia Datuk Seri Salahuddin Ayub DGSM DSPN
- صلاح الدين أيوب
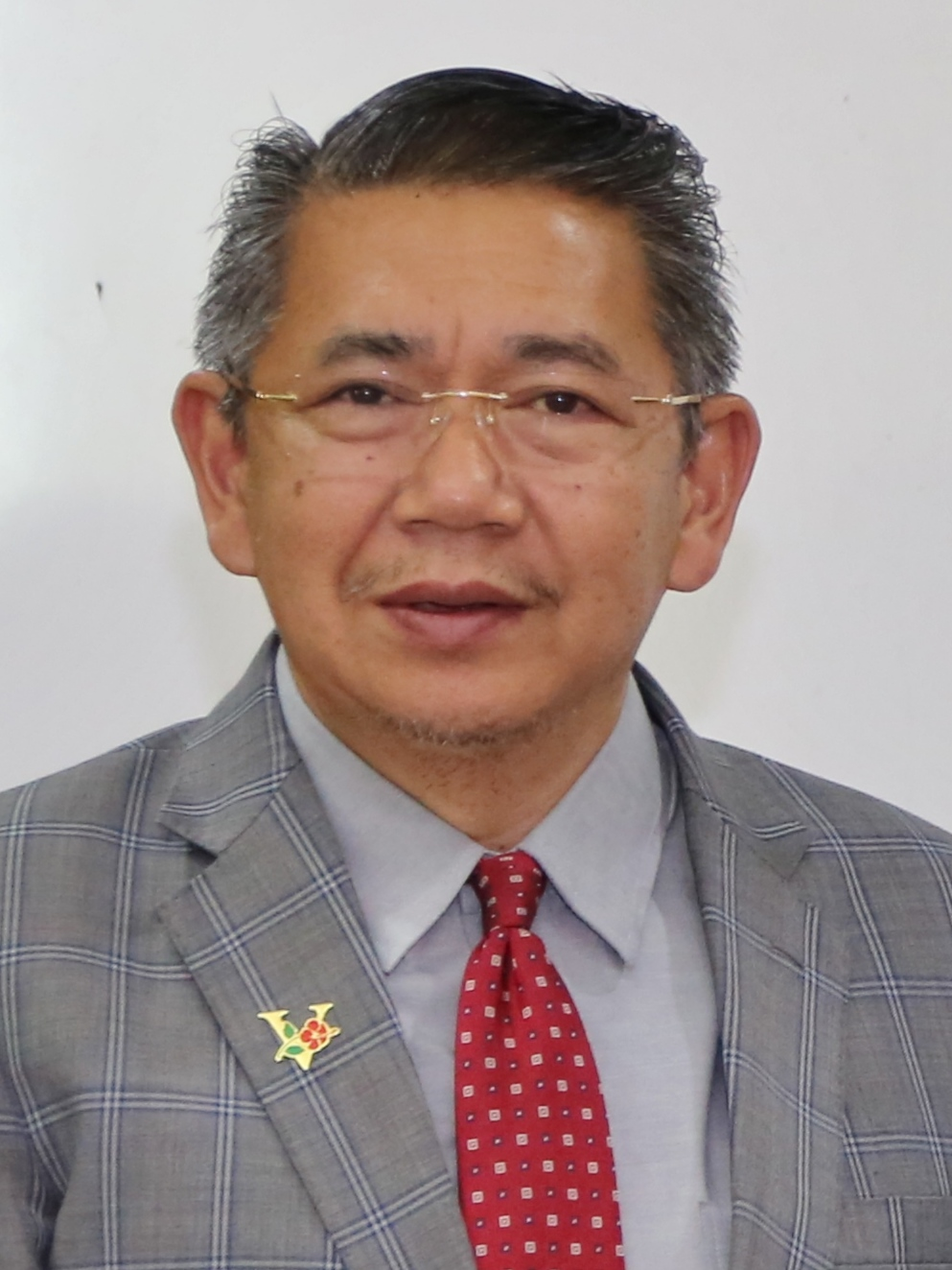
- Salahuddin in 2019

Minister of Domestic Trade and Costs of Living
- In office 3 December 2022 – 23 July 2023
- Monarch: Abdullah
- Prime Minister: Anwar Ibrahim
- Deputy: Fuziah Salleh
- Preceded by: Alexander Nanta Linggi as Minister of Domestic Trade and Consumer Affairs
- Succeeded by: Armizan Mohd Ali (acting); Armizan Mohd Ali
- Constituency: Pulai

Minister of Agriculture and Agro-based Industry
- In office 21 May 2018 – 24 February 2020
- Monarchs: Muhammad V (2018–2019); Abdullah (2019–2020)
- Prime Minister: Mahathir Mohamad
- Deputy: Sim Tze Tzin
- Preceded by: Ahmad Shabery Cheek
- Succeeded by: Ronald Kiandee (Minister of Agriculture and Food Industries)
- Constituency: Pulai

State Chairman of Pakatan Harapan of Johor
- In office 21 September 2022 – 23 July 2023
- Deputy: Aminolhuda Hassan & Syed Ibrahim Syed Noh & Liew Chin Tong
- National Chairman: Anwar Ibrahim
- Preceded by: Aminolhuda Hassan
- Succeeded by: Aminolhuda Hassan

1st Deputy President of the National Trust Party
- In office 16 September 2015 – 23 July 2023
- President: Mohamad Sabu
- Preceded by: Position established
- Succeeded by: Mujahid Yusof Rawa

Member of the Malaysian Parliament for Pulai
- In office 9 May 2018 – 23 July 2023
- Preceded by: Nur Jazlan Mohamed (BN–UMNO)
- Succeeded by: Suhaizan Kayat (PH–AMANAH)
- Majority: 28,924 (2018); 33,174 (2022)

Member of the Malaysian Parliament for Kubang Kerian
- In office 21 March 2004 – 5 May 2013
- Preceded by: Husam Musa (PAS)
- Succeeded by: Ahmad Baihaki Atiqullah (PAS)
- Majority: 5,627 (2004); 10,642 (2008)

Member of the Johor State Legislative Assembly for Simpang Jeram
- In office 9 May 2018 – 23 July 2023
- Preceded by: Sheikh Ibrahim Salleh (PAS)
- Succeeded by: Nazri Abdul Rahman (PH–AMANAH)
- Majority: 7,687 (2018); 2,399 (2022)

Personal details
- Born: Salahuddin bin Ayub; 1 December 1961 Serkat, Tanjung Piai, Pontian, Johor, Federation of Malaya
- Died: 23 July 2023 (aged 61) Sultanah Bahiyah Hospital, Alor Setar, Kedah, Malaysia
- Cause of death: Brain hemorrhage
- Resting place: Jalan Sulong Muslim Cemetery, Serkat, Tanjung Piai, Johor
- Party: Malaysian Islamic Party (PAS) (1983–2015); National Trust Party (AMANAH) (2015–2023)
- Other political affiliations: Harakah Keadilan Rakyat (HAK) (1970–1990); Angkatan Perpaduan Ummah (APU) (1990–1996); Barisan Alternatif (BA) (1999–2004); Pakatan Rakyat (PR) (2008–2015); Pakatan Harapan (PH) (2015–2023)
- Spouse: Fatimah Taha
- Children: 6
- Education: University of Putra Malaysia; Tunku Abdul Rahman College
- Occupation: Politician
- Website: salahuddinayub.wordpress.com/
- Nickname: Bapa Rahmah Malaysia
- Salahuddin Ayub on Facebook; Salahuddin Ayub on Parliament of Malaysia

Salahuddin bin Ayub (Jawi: صلاح الدين بن أيوب; 1 December 1961 – 23 July 2023) was a Malaysian politician who served as Minister of Domestic Trade and Costs of Living in the Unity Government administration under Prime Minister Anwar Ibrahim from December 2022 to his death in office in July 2023 and Minister of Agriculture and Agro-based Industry in the Pakatan Harapan administration under Prime Minister Mahathir Mohamad from May 2018 to his resignation and the collapse of the PH administration in February 2020. He served as the Member of Parliament (MP) for Pulai from May 2018 to his death in July 2023, MP for Kubang Kerian from March 2004 to May 2013 as well as Member of the Johor State Legislative Assembly (MLA) for Simpang Jeram from May 2018 to his death in July 2023. He was a member of the National Trust Party (AMANAH), a component party of the Pakatan Harapan (PH) coalition. He also served as the 1st and founding Deputy President of AMANAH from September 2015 and State Chairman of PH of Johor from September 2022 to his death in July 2023. He was previously a member, Youth Chief and Vice President of the Malaysian Islamic Party (PAS), a former component party of the former Pakatan Rakyat (PR) and Barisan Alternatif (BA) coalitions. But he together with a few other progressive leaders led by Mohamad Sabu referred as G18 were ousted during the 2015 PAS Muktamar which had launched Gerakan Harapan Baru (GHB) and founded AMANAH.

== Early life and education ==
Salahuddin Ayub was born on 1 December 1961 in Kampung Serkat, Tanjung Piai, Pontian, Johor, and was of Malay-Chinese mixed parentage. He received his early education at Serkat English Primary School, Pontian, from 1967 to 1973. Later, he continued his studies at the lower secondary level at Teluk Kerang English Secondary School, Pontian, from 1974 to 1976, and at Sri Perhentian Secondary School, Pontian, from 1977 to 1978, where he completed Form 5. He then pursued his sixth form at Sekolah Menengah Kebangsaan Datuk Penggawa Barat, Pontian, from 1979 to 1980. Additionally, in 1977, he completed his Islamic religious studies at the Johor State Islamic Religious School.

After graduating from school, Salahuddin pursued a Diploma in Business Administration at Tunku Abdul Rahman College (KTAR) from 1982 to 1983. He then went on to obtain his Bachelor of Science (Human Development) at University of Putra Malaysia (UPM) in 1984.

== Career and social activism ==
Salahuddin started his early career as a Financial Officer at MUI Bank in 1980, before delving into social and youth activism within Angkatan Belia Islam Malaysia (ABIM) as the Pontian branch Secretary from 1981 to 1983. Subsequently, he ventured into politics in 1983.

== Politics ==
Salahuddin was involved in PAS from 1999, and was selected by them to contest the Johor State Legislative Assembly state seat of Benut in the 1999 general election but lost. He was picked to contest federal parliamentary seat of Kubang Kerian, Kelantan in the 2004 general election which he had won. He was re-elected again in 2008 general election. For the 2013 election he returned to his home state of Johor to contest the parliamentary seat of Pulai, losing to its Barisan Nasional incumbent Nur Jazlan Mohamed. He also contested, and lost the Johor seat of Nusajaya. In the 2018 general election, Salahuddin for the first time contested under AMANAH of Pakatan Harapan and won both the federal parliamentary seat of Pulai and the Johor state seat of Simpang Jeram.

=== PAS ===
In the early stages of Salahuddin's political career, he was actively involved with the Malaysian Islamic Party (PAS) and held various leadership positions within the party.

From 1983 to 1987, Salahuddin served as the Vice-President of PAS Pontian. Following that, he held several roles within the PAS Pontian Youth, including being the Youth Chief from 1987 to 1989. He then went on to become the Johor PAS Youth Chief, a position he held from 1989 to 1999.

During his tenure in PAS Youth, Salahuddin took on additional responsibilities, including serving as a Youth Exco member from 1991 to 1995 and as the PAS Youth Information Chief from 1995 to 1997. Later, he assumed the role of the Central PAS Youth Council Secretary from 1997 to 1999.

Salahuddin's involvement with PAS Youth continued, and he was appointed as the PAS Youth Vice-Chairman from 1999 to 2001. Subsequently, he held the position of Deputy Head of PAS Youth Council from 2001 to 2003 and eventually became the PAS Youth Chief, serving from 2003 to 2009.

In recognition of his contributions and leadership within the party, Salahuddin was appointed as the Vice President of PAS, holding the position from 2009 to 2015.

Apart from his roles within PAS and PAS Youth, Salahuddin also had responsibilities within the Johor state chapter of the party. He served as the Johor PAS Information Chief from 1997 to 2001 and briefly as the Johor PAS Liaison Secretary in 2001. He was also the Johor PAS Deputy Commissioner from 2001 to 2003. Additionally, he was a Member of the Central PAS Committee from 2001 to 2003.

During his time with PAS Youth, Salahuddin held various positions within the organization's committees, including being the Head of Lujnah Agriculture and Lujnah Information and Da'wah from 1993 to 1997. He later served as the Head of the National Relations Committee from 1999 to 2001 and the Head of the International Lujnah from 2001 to 2003. Furthermore, he was the Head of Lujnah User and Environment from 2001 to 2003.

In the 2013 Malaysian general election, Salahuddin contested the Pulai parliamentary constituency in Johor and the Nusajaya State Assembly seat (now known as Iskandar City). However, he was unsuccessful in both attempts, losing to Barisan Nasional (BN) candidates in both constituencies.

=== AMANAH ===
- Appointed Deputy President of AMANAH in 2015.
- Won the Simpang Jeram state seat in the 2018 Malaysian general election.
- Won the Pulai parliamentary seat in the 2018 Malaysian general election.

=== Pakatan Harapan ===
- Appointed Vice President of Pakatan Harapan on 22 September 2015.

=== Experience ===
- Participated in the Malaysian Youth Associations Association to support the Lebanese people by all the leaders of the National Political Party in 2006.
- Prime Debate with UMNO's Nazri Abdul Aziz in 2003.
- Detained at Kajang Prison in 2001 for being involved in an illegal assembly of Ops Cricket Israel at University of Malaya in 1997.
- Leader of the humanitarian mission of the PAS Youth Council to Kosovo (1999), Afghanistan (2002), Vietnam (2002), Iraq (2003) and Lebanon (2006).
- Malaysian Government Representative while being Member of Parliament to sit on the Special Committee of Parliament on Unity and PLN.
- Member of the International Parliamentary Organization (IPO) and member of the Caucus of the Defense of Humanity Standing.

== Election results ==
Johor State Legislative Assembly
Year	Constituency	Candidate	Votes	Pct	Opponent(s)	Votes	Pct	Ballots cast	Majority	Turnout
1999	N53 Benut	Salahuddin Ayub (PAS)	4,701	27.20%	Salehon Sengot (UMNO)	11,970	69.25%	17,286	7,269	73.32%
2013	N49 Nusa Jaya	Salahuddin Ayub (PAS)	20,965	46.58%	Zaini Abu Bakar (UMNO)	23,166	51.48%	45,120	2,201	89.90%
2018	N13 Simpang Jeram	Salahuddin Ayub (AMANAH)	14,640	61.63%	Mohd Radzi Amin (UMNO)	6,953	29.27%	24,069	7,687	85.40%
2018	N13 Simpang Jeram	Salahuddin Ayub (AMANAH)	14,640	61.63%	Mohd Mazri Yahya (PAS)	2,136	8.99%	24,069	7,687	85.40%
2018	N13 Simpang Jeram	Salahuddin Ayub (AMANAH)	14,640	61.63%	Ahmad Hashim (IND)	28	0.10%	24,069	7,687	85.40%
2022	N13 Simpang Jeram	Salahuddin Ayub (AMANAH)	8,749	40.94%	Zarul Salleh (PAS)	6,350	29.72%	21,369	2,399	53.40%
2022	N13 Simpang Jeram	Salahuddin Ayub (AMANAH)	8,749	40.94%	Lokman Md Don (UMNO)	6,062	28.37%	21,369	2,399	53.40%
2022	N13 Simpang Jeram	Salahuddin Ayub (AMANAH)	8,749	40.94%	Mahaizal Mahmor (PEJUANG)	208	0.97%	21,369	2,399	53.40%

Parliament of Malaysia
Year	Constituency	Candidate	Votes	Pct	Opponent(s)	Votes	Pct	Ballots cast	Majority	Turnout
2004	P024 Kubang Kerian	Salahuddin Ayub (PAS)	21,430	57.56%	Ahmad Rusli Iberahim (UMNO)	15,803	42.44%	38,458	5,627	81.57%
2008	P024 Kubang Kerian	Salahuddin Ayub (PAS)	27,179	62.17%	Ab Ghani Mamat (UMNO)	16,537	37.83%	44,474	10,642	83.14%
2013	P161 Pulai	Salahuddin Ayub (PAS)	40,525	48.09%	Nur Jazlan Mohamed (UMNO)	43,751	51.91%	85,924	3,226	85.51%
2018	P161 Pulai	Salahuddin Ayub (AMANAH)	55,447	63.81%	Nur Jazlan Mohamed (UMNO)	26,523	30.52%	86,893	28,924	81.77%
2018	P161 Pulai	Salahuddin Ayub (AMANAH)	55,447	63.81%	Mohd Mazri Yahya (PAS)	4,332	4.99%	86,893	28,924	81.77%
2018	P161 Pulai	Salahuddin Ayub (AMANAH)	55,447	63.81%	Yap Keng Tak (IND)	591	0.68%	86,893	28,924	81.77%
2022	P161 Pulai	Salahuddin Ayub (AMANAH)	64,900	55.33%	Nur Jazlan Mohamed (UMNO)	31,726	27.05%	117,303	33,174	70.96%
2022	P161 Pulai	Salahuddin Ayub (AMANAH)	64,900	55.33%	Loh Kah Yong (Gerakan)	20,677	17.63%	117,303	33,174	70.96%

== Personal life ==
Ayub married his wife, Fatimah Taha in 1985 and the couple are blessed with six children and eight grandchildren.

=== Illness and death ===
On 22 July 2023, Salahuddin was confirmed to have suffered from a brain hemorrhage by a specialist doctor. He was immediately rushed to Sultanah Bahiyah Hospital in Alor Setar, Kedah, after experiencing symptoms of nausea and vomiting. Following his admission, Salahuddin underwent a four-hour surgery and operation to address the condition. He was closely monitored by a team of specialists and was reported to be recovering well. On 23 July 2023, Salahuddin died at the age of 61. He left behind his wife, six children, eight grandchildren and his elderly widowed 83 year old mother, Aminah Abdullah (born 1940).

He was laid to rest at Jalan Sulong Muslim Cemetery, Pontian, near the graves of his father, Ayub Umar (1935–2008) and grandfather.

== Honours ==
=== Honours of Malaysia ===
- Malaysia
  - Recipient of the 16th Yang di-Pertuan Agong Installation Medal (2019)
- Malacca
  - Grand Commander of the Exalted Order of Malacca (DGSM) – Datuk Seri (2019)
- Penang
  - Officer of the Order of the Defender of State (DSPN) – Dato' (2018)

== See also ==
- Members of the Malaysian Parliament who represented multiple states
