= Irmohizam Ibrahim =

Malaysian politician

Yang Berbahagia Dato' Sri Irmohizam Ibrahim PJN SSAP DGSM DCSM DIMP DSIS PGDK JMN KMN BCM PJK
- ايرموهيزم إبراهيم

Member of the Malaysian Parliament for Kuala Selangor
- In office 5 May 2013 – 9 May 2018
- Preceded by: Dzulkefly Ahmad (PR–PAS)
- Succeeded by: Dzulkefly Ahmad (PH–AMANAH)
- Majority: 460 (2013)

Personal details
- Born: Irmohizam bin Ibrahim; 6 April 1976 (age 50) Kampung Kuantan, Kuala Selangor, Selangor, Malaysia
- Party: United Malays National Organization (UMNO)
- Other political affiliations: Barisan Nasional (BN)
- Education: International Islamic University of Malaysia (LLB), (LLM); Universiti Teknologi MARA (MBA); University of Malaya (MPA); National University of Malaysia (PhD)
- Occupation: Group Managing Director; Corporate Figure
- Irmohizam Ibrahim on Facebook; Irmohizam Ibrahim on X

Irmohizam bin Ibrahim (Jawi: ارم الهيثم إبراهيم, Malay pronunciation: [irmohizam]; born 6 April 1976) is a Malaysian politician and corporate figure who served as the Member of Parliament (MP) for Kuala Selangor from May 2013 to May 2018. He is a member of the United Malays National Organisation (UMNO), a component party of the Barisan Nasional (BN) coalition. He is also the Group Managing Director of the World Trade Centre Kuala Lumpur (WTCKL), and is the First Malaysian elected to the Board of Director, World Trade Centers Association (WTCA). He also served as the Chairman of Conferences & Exhibitions Member Advisory Council (MAC) WTCA.

== Early life and education ==
Irmohizam received his early education at Kelana Jaya 1 National Primary School and Bukit Bintang National Secondary School (L) in Petaling Jaya. Later, he received admission to a boarding school at Tengku Abdullah Science Secondary School, Raub, Pahang.

He then pursued higher education at the International Islamic University of Malaysia (IIUM) and received an advanced diploma in law and a Bachelor of Law (Hons). He was active in co-curricular activities and an activist while he was still studying at IIUM. Later, he continued his Bachelor of Laws (Hons), Master of Law (LLM) and was awarded a Doctor of Philosophy (PhD) at Universiti Kebangsaan Malaysia (UKM). In 2019, he continued his studies and was awarded a Master of Business Administration (MBA) from Arshad Ayub Graduate Business School (AAGBS) at Universiti Teknologi MARA (UiTM). He continued to pursue a Master of Public Administration (MPA) at the Faculty of Economics & Administration, University of Malaya and has a Master of Science (Business & Administration) from the Universiti Pertahanan Nasional Malaysia (UPNM). He graduated from Asia e University in Doctor Business Administration (DBA) APEL (Q). He recently got a third PhD at Universiti Pertahanan Nasional Malaysia (UPNM) in Doctor of Philosophy (Management & Administration Defense).

He was also a former lecturer of law at the Faculty of Law, UiTM from 2008 to 2011. He has now been appointed adjunct professor of the School of Hospitality, Tourism & Events at Taylor's University and first Malaysian to become the visiting professor in Center of Malaysia Scholars, College of International Relations at Huaqiao University in China. Later, he has now been appointed as adjunct professor at DRB-HICOM University of Automotive Malaysia and adjunct professor, faculty of education in National University of Malaysia. In 2023, Irmohizam was appointed as the Pro-Chancellor 1 at Universiti Geomatika Malaysia making him the youngest Pro-Chancellor to be appointed.

In addition, among the certificates obtained by him are from Harvard University where he studied China & Communism and Entrepreneurship in Emerging Economics. Irmohizam has also studied at Harvard Business School where he attended the 10th ASEAN Senior Management Development Program. Other certificates that he has obtained include Corporate Directors Training Program Fundamental (SSM), Marketing Strategy in Digital World Build High Impact Plans, High Impact Presentation Attested - Dale Carnegie & Associates, Inc (2011), Advocate & Solicator High Court in Malaya in 2001 and a Certificate of Achievement (The Economist) International.

== Career ==
After studying, he practiced his law skill as an advocate & solicitor at the High Court of Malaya. He now owns his own law firm, Ganesan & Irmohizam Advocate & Solicitors where the firm oversees matters related to bankruptcy, debt recovery, business loans, rentals, hire purchase, housing financing, sale of goods, probate and administration. He has also held lectures and training for law students at Universiti Teknologi MARA (UiTM) and was appointed as an examiner. Irmohizam has also been a guest speaker for Postgraduate Studies of the Faculty of Law at UITM.

=== Government and GLCs ===
Irmohizam has also served as the Special Officer to various portfolios such as the Minister of Education Malaysia (2001 & 2004), Higher Education (2005), Rural Development (2006-2008), and Special Officer to the Prime Minister (2012). He has also served within the National Civics Bureau within the Prime Minister's Department, Member of the Board of Directors of the National Higher Education Fund Corporation (PTPTN) and The Board of Executive Directors of Utusan Melayu (M) Berhad.

Irmohizam is formerly an advisor to the Ministry of National Unity Malaysia and the Ministry of Agriculture & Food Industry Malaysia (MAFI). He was appointed as the Special Action Committee to Address Student Social Problems under the Ministry of Higher Education Malaysia (MOHE).

=== Corporate ===
He held various of positions in corporate world where he was the chairman of Dancom Group, chairman of the Malaysian Fisheries Development Authority (LKIM) in 2013-2018, chairman of Bina Nusa Foundation Shd. Bhd, corporate advisor of Tadmansori Holdings Sdn. Bhd., Nusantara Meat Sdn. Bhd. and director of Cita Capital Sdn. Bhd. He also serves various positions in UITM, where he was the Board member, member of the Entrepreneurship Advisory Committee, Chair of the Council Member Institutions Rulers and advisor to UiTM FC. Irmohizam is also the chairman of the finance committee and a board member at the Malaysia External Trade Development Corporation (MATRADE), and the Chairman of the board of visitors of Shah Alam Hospital.

In 2020, he made history when the World Trade Centers Association (WTCA) named him as the chairman of the Asia Pacific Member Advisory Council (Conferences & Exhibitions). He plays a chairing role, setting the agenda of the meeting and setting the direction for all World Trade Centers throughout Asia Pacific. He is the first Malaysian to succeed in holding a seat in the WTCA. Irmohizam has also received an award from the World Trade Centre Kuala Lumpur on The International Business Review ASEAN Awards for Corporate Excellence in the Hospitality & Tourism Sector for Transformative Meetings, Incentives, Conferences & Exhibitions (MICE) Management. Currently, he is active in the meetings, incentives, conferences and exhibitions (MICE) industry when he was appointed as a member of the advisory board, Malaysian Association of Convention & Exhibition Organizers & Suppliers (MACEOS). He is also board of advisors of Global Chamber of Business Leader with a coalition of C suite executives, entrepreneurs, investors, governmental and industry leaders.

=== Non-governmental organizations ===
Irmohizam was also the former president and vice president of the Selangor Youth Council (MBS) in 2010-2013. In addition, he was also the former vice president and secretary-general of Gabungan Pelajar Melayu Semenanjung (GPMS), Commissioner of Scouts Headquarters, national member of the National Youth Consultative Council, deputy chairman of the Association of Alumni of SMEs, and panel member of the Consumer Education Consultant of the Federation of Malaysian Consumers Associations (FOMCA & CEUPACS & NCWO & MBM). Currently, he is the vice president of the Council of Federal Datuks Malaysia (MDPM).

== Election results ==
Parliament of Malaysia
Year	Constituency	Candidate	Votes	Pct	Opponent(s)	Votes	Pct	Ballots cast	Majority	Turnout
2013	P096 Kuala Selangor	Irmohizam Ibrahim (UMNO)	27,500	50.42%	Dzulkefly Ahmad (PAS)	27,040	49.58%	55,592	460	89.24%
2018	P096 Kuala Selangor	Irmohizam Ibrahim (UMNO)	21,344	35.74%	Dzulkefly Ahmad (AMANAH)	29,842	49.97%	60,843	8,498	87.70%
2018	P096 Kuala Selangor	Irmohizam Ibrahim (UMNO)	21,344	35.74%	Mohd Fakaruddin Ismail (PAS)	8,535	14.29%	60,843	8,498	87.70%

== Honours ==
- Malaysia
  - Commander of the Order of Meritorious Service (PJN) – Datuk (2017)
  - Companion of the Order of the Defender of the Realm (JMN) (2012)
  - Officer of the Order of the Defender of the Realm (KMN) (2010)
- Malacca
  - Grand Commander of the Exalted Order of Malacca (DGSM) – Datuk Seri (2024)
  - Knight Commander of the Exalted Order of Malacca (DCSM) – Datuk Wira (2020)
  - Recipient of the Distinguished Service Star (BCM) (2006)
- Pahang
  - Knight Grand Companion of the Order of Sultan Ahmad Shah of Pahang (SSAP) – Dato' Sri (2015)
  - Knight Companion of the Order of the Crown of Pahang (DIMP) – Dato' (2010)
- Sabah
  - Commander of the Order of Kinabalu (PGDK) – Datuk (2014)
- Selangor
  - Knight Companion of the Order of Sultan Sharafuddin Idris Shah (DSIS) – Dato' (2026)
  - Recipient of the Meritorious Service Medal (PJK) (2003)
