= Abdul Ghani Samsudin =

Malaysian politician

Yang Berbahagia Datuk Wira Ustaz Abdul Ghani Samsudin DCSM

Deputy General Adviser of National Trust Party
- Incumbent
- Assumed office 2015
- President: Mohamad Sabu
- General Adviser: Ahmad Awang
- Preceded by: Position establish

Personal details
- Born: 25 July 1946 (age 79) Masjid Tanah, Malacca, Malayan Union
- Party: Malaysian Islamic Party (PAS) (−2015); National Trust Party (AMANAH) (since 2015)
- Other political affiliations: Pakatan Rakyat (PR) (2008–2015); Pakatan Harapan (PH) (since 2015); Barisan Nasional (BN) (aligned:since 2022)
- Occupation: Politician, scholar

Abdul Ghani bin Samsudin (born 1946) is a Malaysian politician and is a member of the National Trust Party (AMANAH), a component party of the Pakatan Harapan (PH) coalition. He also served as Deputy General Adviser of National Trust Party (AMANAH) since the establishment of the party in 2015.

== Education and career ==
Abdul Ghani received his early education at Masjid Tanah National School, Melaka and Madrasah Aljunied Al-Islamiah, Singapore before attending Maahad Buuth Islamiyah al Azhar, Egypt (1965–1967). He then continued his studies at Al-Azhar University in Egypt (1967–1974) and obtained a Masters (Sharia) in the field of comparative sects and law.

Upon his return to Malaysia, Abdul Ghani served as a religion teacher at Sekolah Kebangsaan Sekolah Agama Sharifah Rodziah, Malacca. One year teaching in Melaka, he then became a lecturer at Institut Teknologi MARA (ITM), Shah Alam and served for 7 years. In the early 80s, he was transferred to ITM Sabah Branch, Kota Kinabalu. About 6 months later, he was ordered out of Sabah within 48 hours by the Chief Minister, Datuk Harris Salleh and returned to ITM Shah Alam for a while. Then, he moved to the Faculty of Education Universiti Malaya in 1981 until he retired in 2001.

== Community and politics ==
He was involved in Angkatan Belia Islam Malaysia (ABIM) until he was entrusted as Deputy President in the early 80s. He was also active in the Persatuan Ulama Malaysia (PUM) and was appointed as its president in 1999–2003, replacing Ustaz Ahmad Awang. Later, he also founded and led another ulama organization, the Secretariat of the Association of Ulama Rantau Asia (SHURA). He was also appointed as a Member of the Board of Trustees of Yayasan Dakwah Islamiah Malaysia (YADIM) in 2019 under the leadership of the President, Ustaz Nik Omar Nik Abdul Aziz.

=== Politics ===
Abdul Ghani joined Malaysian Islamic Party after leading ABIM. He was once appointed as a Member of the Central PAS Working Committee and Secretary of PAS Shura Ulama Council (1999–2010). He left PAS in 2015 and joined Malaysian Workers' Party (PPM) before the party changed its name to National Trust Party (AMANAH). Since joining AMANAH, he has been appointed as Deputy General Adviser of the party.

== Election results ==
Parliament of Malaysia
Year	Constituency	Candidate	Votes	Pct	Opponent(s)	Votes	Pct	Ballots cast	Majority	Turnout
2004	P095 Tanjong Karang	Abdul Ghani Samsudin (PAS)	8,742	33.00%	Noh Omar (UMNO)	17,750	67.00%	27,196	9,008	75.93%

Selangor State Legislative Assembly
Year	Constituency	Candidate	Votes	Pct	Opponent(s)	Votes	Pct	Ballots cast	Majority	Turnout
2008	N08 Sungai Burong	Abdul Ghani Samsudin (PAS)	6,162	40.99%	Mohd Shamsudin Lias (UMNO)	8,872	59.01%	15,403	2,710	81.12%

== Awards and recognition ==
- Malacca
  - Knight Commander of the Exalted Order of Malacca (DCSM) – Datuk Wira (2018)
