= Gerakan Harapan Baru =

Ongoing social movement in Malaysia

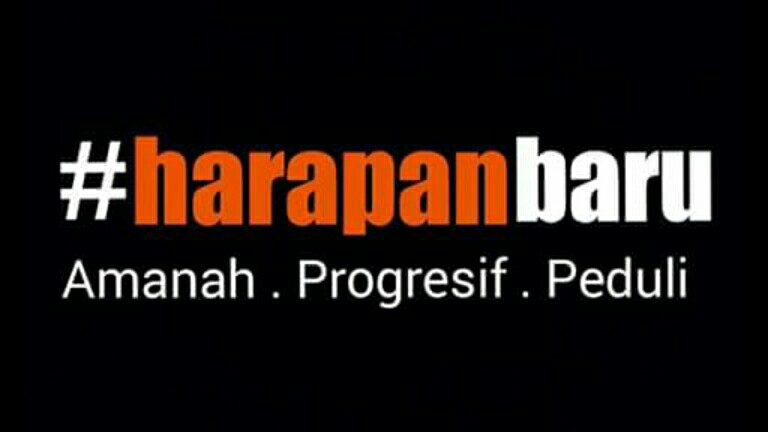
Gerakan Harapan Baru

The New Hope Movement (Malay: Gerakan Harapan Baru) or simply known as GHB, was a social movement in Malaysia. The movement was launched by G18 led by former PAS deputy president Mohamad Sabu at a hotel in downtown Kuala Lumpur on 13 July 2015. The G18 is the former moderate and progressive leaders of PAS who were ousted from senior position earlier at the party's 2015 PAS Muktamar.

The movement was the principles of moderation, inclusiveness, progressiveness and concern for the people, and committed to the real value of Islam, 'mercy to all' (rahmatan lil 'alamin) which gives protection and justice to all Malaysian. Membership of the movement is open to anyone, including non-Muslims.

== Pro-tem committee ==
The pro-tem committee of Gerakan Harapan Baru including the G18 members:

- Mohamad Sabu
- Salahuddin Ayub
- Mujahid Yusof Rawa
- Suhaizan Kayat
- Kamarudin Jaffar
- Ahmad Awang
- Dzulkefly Ahmad
- Mohamed Hanipa Maidin
- Khalid Samad
- Siti Mariah Mahmud
- Muhammad Muhammad Taib

== Background ==
Nadwah Ulama Nahdah Jadidah 2015 (NUNJI 15) or in English, Convention of Scholars for Contemporary Reform 2015 was held in effort:

- to design a working framework of siyasah syariyyah and fiqh for Malaysia in a multi-races country
- to gather local and abroad scholars from wide spectrum of school of thoughts
- to seek scholarly opinions to lay the foundation of their Islamic agenda
- to ensure the resolution of convention and scholars becomes the fundamental principles in Gerakan Harapan Baru

The basis of Gerakan Harapan Baru ideologies are Syura (Consultation) and guidance from scholars and Muslim thinkers.

== Takeover of Malaysian Workers' Party ==
On 31 August 2015, Mohamad Sabu announced GHB took over a dormant Malaysian political party, Malaysian Workers' Party after its attempt to form a new party called Parti Progresif Islam (PPI) was rejected by the Home Affairs Ministry.

== Rebranding to National Trust Party ==
Malaysian Workers Party members approved the change of its name to National Trust Party or Parti Amanah Negara (AMANAH) in an extraordinary general meeting (EGM) on 8 September 2015. AMANAH was officially launched on 16 September 2015 at national level, while it was still awaiting the approval of the Registrar of Societies (RoS). AMANAH is taking over and rebranding the Workers' Party into a new political party spearheaded by progressive leaders, who have left PAS. The new logo and flag was also unveiled at its official launch on that day.

== See also ==
- National Trust Party (Malaysia)
- Social movements
