= Husam Musa =

Malaysian politician

Yang Berbahagia Datuk Husam Musa DMSM JMK
- حسام بن موسى
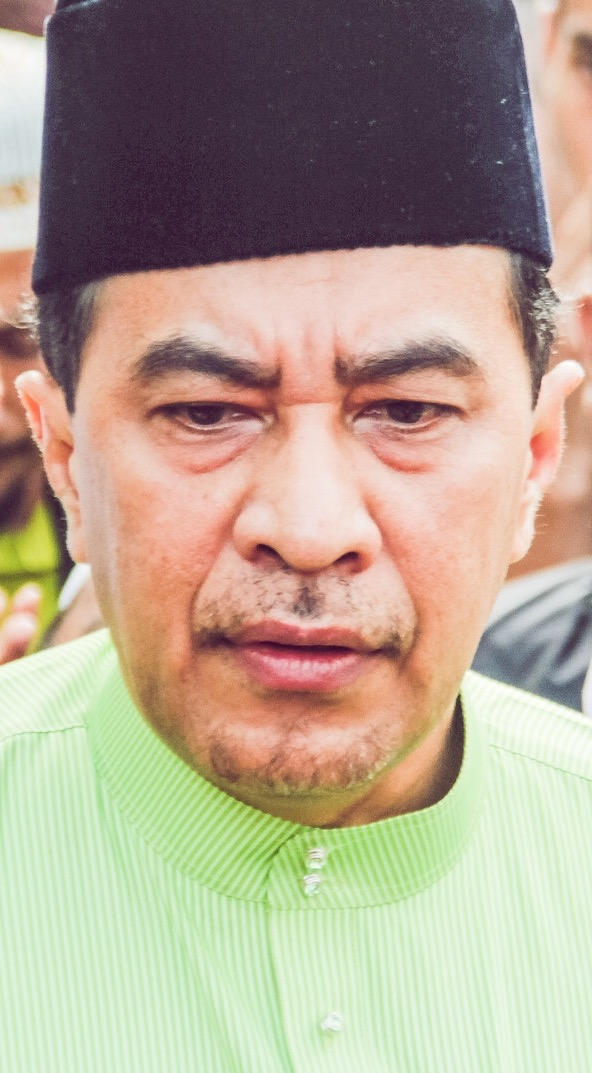
- Husam Musa in 2013

State Chairman of the Pakatan Harapan of Kelantan
- In office 30 August 2017 – 9 March 2021
- Preceded by: Himself
- Succeeded by: Muhammad Husain

Exco roles (Kelantan)
- 2004–2008: Chairman of the Planning, Finance and National Development
- 2008–2013: Chairman of the Economic Planning, Finance and Welfare

Faction represented in Dewan Negara
- 2018–2021: Pakatan Harapan

Faction represented in Dewan Rakyat
- 1999–2004: Malaysian Islamic Party

Faction represented in Kelantan State Legislative Assembly
- 2004–2016: Malaysian Islamic Party
- 2016–2018: National Trust Party

Other roles
- 2018–2020: Chairman of Kemubu Agriculture Development Authority (KADA)
- 2023–: Chairman of Syarikat Perumahan Negara Bhd (SPNB)

Personal details
- Born: Husam bin Musa; 14 October 1959 (age 67) Kampung Kota, Kota Bharu, Kelantan, Federation of Malaya (now Malaysia)
- Citizenship: Malaysian
- Party: Malaysian Islamic Party (PAS) (till 2016); National Trust Party (AMANAH) (since 2016)
- Other political affiliations: Barisan Alternatif (BA) (1999-2004); Pakatan Rakyat (PR) (2008-2015); Pakatan Harapan (PH) (since 2016)
- Spouse: Rohana Abd Rahman
- Children: 7 sons
- Parent(s): Musa; Salma Idris
- Education: University of Malaya
- Occupation: Politician
- Website: www.husammusa.com
- Husam Musa on Parliament of Malaysia

Datuk Husam bin Musa (Jawi: حسام بن موسى; born 14 October 1959) is a Malaysian politician who served as a senator in the Dewan Negara from 2018 to 2021. He held the position of vice-president in the National Trust Party (AMANAH), a component party of the Pakatan Harapan (PH) coalition, until September 2020.

== Political career ==
A vice-president of the Pan-Malaysian Islamic Party (PAS) from 2011 to 2015, he was considered the leader of the party's liberal wing. He was expelled from the party for alleged misconduct on 6 May 2016.

As a PAS member, Husam represented Salor (2008–2018) and Kijang (2004–2008) in the Kelantan State Legislative Assembly. He was also the member of parliament for Kubang Kerian (1999–2004). His time as a member of parliament brought him some prominence, and he received the accolade of "Newsmaker of the Year 2003" from Malaysiakini for his tenacity to bring up issues of public interest.

In the 2018 Malaysian general election, he contested and failed to win the Kota Bharu parliamentary and Salor state seats as a member of the National Trust Party (AMANAH).

He was appointed to serve a three-year term as senator, lasting from September 2018 to September 2021.

Husam resigned as vice-president of AMANAH in 2020 amid rumours of a disagreement between him and party leader Mohamad Sabu.

== Election results ==
Parliament of Malaysia
Year	Constituency	Candidate	Votes	Pct	Opponent(s)	Votes	Pct	Ballots cast	Majority	Turnout
1999	P024 Kubang Kerian	Husam Musa (PAS)	25,384	73.20%	Siti Jeliha @ Zaleha Hussin (UMNO)	9,293	26.80%	35,246	16,091	76.79%
2013	P125 Putrajaya	Husam Musa (PAS)	4,402	30.69%	Tengku Adnan Tengku Mansor (UMNO)	9,943	69.31%	14,465	5,541	91.60%
2018	P021 Kota Bharu	Husam Musa (AMANAH)	22,422	33.48%	Takiyuddin Hassan (PAS)	28,291	42.24%	68,306	5,869	77.00%
2018	P021 Kota Bharu	Husam Musa (AMANAH)	22,422	33.48%	Fikhran Hamshi Mohd Fatmi (UMNO)	16,256	24.27%	68,306	5,869	77.00%
2022	P022 Pasir Mas	Husam Musa (AMANAH)	6,439	9.88%	Ahmad Fadhli Shaari (PAS)	44,444	68.21%	66,145	30,717	68.91%
2022	P022 Pasir Mas	Husam Musa (AMANAH)	6,439	9.88%	Abdul Ghani Harun (UMNO)	13,727	21.07%	66,145	30,717	68.91%
2022	P022 Pasir Mas	Husam Musa (AMANAH)	6,439	9.88%	Nasrul Ali Hassan Abdul Latif (PUTRA)	543	0.83%	66,145	30,717	68.91%

Kelantan State Legislative Assembly
Year	Constituency	Candidate	Votes	Pct	Opponent(s)	Votes	Pct	Ballots cast	Majority	Turnout
2004	N05 Kijang	Husam Musa (PAS)	6,916	62.16%	Che Rosli Hassan (UMNO)	4,034	36.26%	11,126	2,882	79.35%
2008	N17 Salor	Husam Musa (PAS)	8,329	60.96%	Ismail Mamat (UMNO)	5,097	37.31%	13,662	3,232	82.66%
2013	N17 Salor	Husam Musa (PAS)	10,231	60.73%	Noordin Awang (UMNO)	6,548	38.87%	17,042	3,683	85.16%
2018	N17 Salor	Husam Musa (AMANAH)	3,617	16.93%	Saiful Adli Abd Bakar (PAS)	11,206	52.46%	21,836	4,666	80.39%
2018	N17 Salor	Husam Musa (AMANAH)	3,617	16.93%	Mohd Noordin Awang (UMNO)	6,540	30.61%	21,836	4,666	80.39%

== Honours ==
Husam was earlier conferred the Dato' Paduka Jiwa Mahkota Kelantan award which carries the title Dato' when he was an exco in 2006 by Sultan Ismail Petra but the award was revoked by his son, Sultan Muhammad V in February 2018. On 13 October 2018, Husam was awarded Darjah Mulia Seri Melaka by Tuan Yang Terutama Yang Dipertua Negeri Melaka which carries the title Datuk.

- Kelantan
  - Companion of the Order of the Life of the Crown of Kelantan (JMK) (2005)
  - Knight Commander of the Order of the Life of the Crown of Kelantan (DJMK) – Dato' (2006, revoked on 6 February 2018)
- Malacca
  - Companion Class I of the Exalted Order of Malacca (DMSM) – Datuk (2018)
