= Kubang Kerian (federal constituency) =

Federal constituency of Kelantan, Malaysia

Kubang Kerian (P024)
Kelantan constituency

Federal constituency
- Legislature: Dewan Rakyat
- MP: Tuan Ibrahim Tuan Man; PN
- Constituency created: 1994
- First contested: 1995
- Last contested: 2022

Demographics
- Population (2020): 156,627
- Electors (2023): 114,353
- Area (km²): 141
- Pop. density (per km²): 1,110.8

Kubang Kerian is a federal constituency in Kota Bharu District, Kelantan, Malaysia, that has been represented in the Dewan Rakyat since 1995.

The federal constituency was created in the 1994 redistribution and is mandated to return a single member to the Dewan Rakyat under the first past the post voting system.

== Demographics ==
https://live.chinapress.com.my/ge15/parliament/KELANTAN

Ethnic breakdown of Kubang Kerian's electorate as of 2022
1. Malay (97.7%)
2. Chinese (2.00%)
3. Indian (0.20%)
4. Other ethnicities (0.10%)

As of 2020, Kubang Kerian has a population of 156,627 people.

Age breakdown of Kubang Kerian's electorate as of 2022
1. 18-20 (6.53%)
2. 21-29 (22.7%)
3. 30-39 (23.4%)
4. 40-49 (16.9%)
5. 50-59 (13.4%)
6. 60-69 (9.75%)
7. 70-79 (5.04%)
8. 80-89 (1.71%)
9. above 90 (0.53%)
Gender breakdown of Kubang Kerian's electorate as of 2022
1. Male (49.1%)
2. Female (50.9%)

== History ==
=== Polling districts ===
According to the federal gazette issued on 18 July 2023, the Kubang Kerian constituency is divided into 40 polling districts.

State constituency	Polling Districts	Code	Location
Salor (N17）	Wakaf Zain	024/17/01	SK Pendek
Salor (N17）	Kota Selatan	024/17/02	SK Seri Kota
Salor (N17）	Pendek	024/17/03	SK Pendek
Salor (N17）	Larak	024/17/04	SK Mulong (2)
Salor (N17）	Mulong	024/17/05	SMK Mulong
Salor (N17）	Telok Kandis	024/17/06	SMK Salor
Salor (N17）	Salor	024/17/07	SMK Salor
Salor (N17）	Kampung Kubang Rawa	024/17/08	SK Salor
Salor (N17）	Seberang Pasir Mas	024/17/09	SK Seberang Pasir Mas
Salor (N17）	Pengkalan Kubor	024/17/10	SK Pengkalan Kubor Salor
Salor (N17）	Dewan	024/17/11	SMK Dewan Beta
Salor (N17）	Beta Hilir	024/17/12	SK Dewan Beta
Salor (N17）	Lubok Jambu	024/17/13	SK Mulong
Salor (N17）	Kampung Kor	024/17/14	SK Kor
Salor (N17）	Beta Hulu	024/17/15	SK Beta Hulu
Salor (N17）	Kedai Piah	024/17/16	SK Kedai Piah
Pasir Tumboh (N18）	Padang Enggang	024/18/01	SMK Padang Enggang
Pasir Tumboh (N18）	Pasir Hor	024/18/02	SK Pasir Hor
Pasir Tumboh (N18）	Tiong	024/18/03	SK Tiong
Pasir Tumboh (N18）	Tunjong	024/18/04	Dewan Sri Tunjong JPN Kelantan
Pasir Tumboh (N18）	Kampung Parit	024/18/05	SK Seribong
Pasir Tumboh (N18）	Pasir Tumboh	024/18/06	SK Long Gafar
Pasir Tumboh (N18）	Kampung Terusan	024/18/07	MRSM Pasir Tumboh
Pasir Tumboh (N18）	Guntong	024/18/08	SMK Long Gafar
Pasir Tumboh (N18）	Lating	024/18/09	SK Kampong Keling
Pasir Tumboh (N18）	Nilam Baru	024/18/10	Kolej Islam Antarabangsa Sultan Ismail Petra
Pasir Tumboh (N18）	Gong Dermin	024/18/11	SK Gong Dermin
Pasir Tumboh (N18）	Kampung Padang	024/18/12	SMK Puteri Saadong
Demit（N19）	Demit	024/19/01	SK Kubang Kerian 3
Demit（N19）	Wakaf Tanjong	024/19/02	SK Mentuan
Demit（N19）	Mentuan	024/19/03	SK Mentuan
Demit（N19）	Kenali	024/19/04	SMK Kubang Kerian
Demit（N19）	Pulong	024/19/05	Maahad Ar-Rahmah Kenali
Demit（N19）	Kampung Chicha	024/19/06	SK Kubang Kerian (2)
Demit（N19）	Kampung Wakaf Stan	024/19/07	SK Wakaf Stan
Demit（N19）	Binjai	024/19/08	SMA (Arab) Al-Yunusiah
Demit（N19）	Lubok Pukol	024/19/09	SK Banggu
Demit（N19）	Banggu	024/19/10	SK Banggu
Demit（N19）	Mentera	024/19/11	SK Mentera
Demit（N19）	Huda	024/19/12	SK Kubang Kerian (1)

=== Representation history ===
Members of Parliament for Kubang Kerian
Parliament	No	Years	Member	Party	Vote Share
Constituency created from Pengkalan Chepa, Nilam Puri and Kota Bharu
9th	P024	1995–1999	Mohamad Sabu (محمد سابو)	APU (PAS)	21,377; 65.52%
10th	P024	1999–2004	Husam Musa (حسام بن موسى)	BA (PAS)	25,384; 73.20%
11th	P024	2004–2008	Salahuddin Ayub (صلاح الدين أيوب)	PAS	21,430; 57.56%
12th	P024	2008–2013	Salahuddin Ayub (صلاح الدين أيوب)	PR (PAS)	27,179; 62.17%
13th	P024	2013–2015	Ahmad Baihaki Atiqullah (احمد بيهقي عتيق الله)	PR (PAS)	35,510; 65.42%
13th	P024	2015–2016	Ahmad Baihaki Atiqullah (احمد بيهقي عتيق الله)	PAS	35,510; 65.42%
13th	P024	2016–2018	Ahmad Baihaki Atiqullah (احمد بيهقي عتيق الله)	GS (PAS)	35,510; 65.42%
14th	P024	2018–2020	Tuan Ibrahim Tuan Man (توان إبراهيم توان من)	GS (PAS)	35,620; 56.16%
14th	P024	2020–2022	Tuan Ibrahim Tuan Man (توان إبراهيم توان من)	PN (PAS)	35,620; 56.16%
15th	P024	2022–present	Tuan Ibrahim Tuan Man (توان إبراهيم توان من)	PN (PAS)	55,654; 68.38%

=== State constituency ===
Parliamentary constituency	State constituency						
Parliamentary constituency	1955–1959*	1959–1974	1974–1986	1986–1995	1995–2004	2004–2018	2018–present
Kubang Kerian						Demit	
Kubang Kerian					Kenali		
Kubang Kerian					Pasir Tumboh		
Kubang Kerian					Salor		

=== Historical boundaries ===
State Constituency	Area		
State Constituency	1994	2003	2018
Demit		Binjai; Gong Dermin; Kenali; Kubang Kerian; Taman Restu	Binjai; Jejulok; Kenali; Kubang Kerian; Lubok Pukol
Kenali	Binjai; Gong Dermin; Kenali; Kubang Kerian; Taman Restu		
Pasir Tumboh	Guntong; Nilam Baru; Pasir Hor; Pasir Tumboh; Tunjong		Gong Dermin; Kampung Padang; Nilam Baru; Pasir Tumboh; Tunjong
Salor	Larak; Mulong; Salor; Telok Kandis; Wakaf Zain		Kampung Kedai Piah; Kampung Kor; Mulong; Salor; Telok Kandis

=== Current state assembly members ===
No.	State Constituency	Member	Coalition (Party)
N17	Salor	Saizol Ismail	PN (PAS)
N18	Pasir Tumboh	Abd Rahman Yunus	PN (PAS)
N19	Demit	Mohd Asri Mat Daud	PN (PAS)

=== Local governments & postcodes ===
No.	State Constituency	Local Government	Postcode
N17	Salor	Ketereh District Council	15100, 15150, 15200, 15250, 16010 Kota Bharu; 16400 Melor
N18	Pasir Tumboh	Kota Bharu Municipal Council; Ketereh District Council (Kampung Guntong and Nilam Baru areas); Bandar Baru Tunjong Corporation (Tunjong area)	15100, 15150, 15200, 15250, 16010 Kota Bharu; 16400 Melor
N19	Demit	Kota Bharu Municipal Council; Ketereh District Council (Mentera area)	15100, 15150, 15200, 15250, 16010 Kota Bharu; 16400 Melor

== Election results ==
Malaysian general election, 2022
Party	Candidate	Votes	%	∆%
PAS	Tuan Ibrahim Tuan Man	55,654	68.38	▲12.22
BN	Nurul Amal Mohd Fauzi	14,807	18.19	▼7.43
PH	Wan Ahmad Kamil Wan Abdullah	10,236	12.58	▲12.58
PEJUANG	Mohamad Rizal Razali	687	0.84	▲0.84
Total valid votes		81,384	100.00	
Total rejected ballots		668		
Unreturned ballots		211		
Turnout		82,263	71.62	▼7.47
Registered electors		113,640		
Majority		40,487	50.19	▲19.65
PAS hold		Swing		
Source(s) https://lom.agc.gov.my/ilims/upload/portal/akta/outputp/1753266/PUB%20607%20(2022).pdf

Malaysian general election, 2018
Party	Candidate	Votes	%	∆%
PAS	Tuan Ibrahim Tuan Man	35,620	56.16	▼9.26
BN	Muhammad Abdul Ghani	16,251	25.62	▼8.96
PKR	Abdul Halim Yusof	11,557	18.22	▲18.22
Total valid votes		63,428	100.00	
Total rejected ballots		735		
Unreturned ballots		704		
Turnout		64,867	79.09	▼5.19
Registered electors		82,018		
Majority		19,369	30.54	▼0.30
PAS hold		Swing		
Source(s) "His Majesty's Government Gazette - Notice of Contested Election, Parliament for the State of Kelantan [P.U. (B) 234/2018]" (PDF). Attorney General's Chambers of Malaysia. 3 May 2018. "Federal Government Gazette - Results of Contested Election and Statements of the Poll after the Official Addition of Votes, Parliamentary Constituencies for the State of Kelantan [P.U. (B) 308/2018]" (PDF). Attorney General's Chambers of Malaysia. 28 May 2018.

Malaysian general election, 2013
Party	Candidate	Votes	%	∆%
PAS	Ahmad Baihaki Atiqullah	35,510	65.42	▲3.25
BN	Anuar Safian	18,769	34.58	▼3.25
Total valid votes		54,279	100.00	
Total rejected ballots		605		
Unreturned ballots		224		
Turnout		55,108	84.28	▲1.14
Registered electors		65,390		
Majority		16,741	30.84	▲6.50
PAS hold		Swing		
Source(s) "Federal Government Gazette - Notice of Contested Election, Parliament for the State of Kelantan [P.U. (B) 171/2013]" (PDF). Attorney General's Chambers of Malaysia. 26 April 2013. "Federal Government Gazette - Results of Contested Election and Statements of the Poll after the Official Addition of Votes, Parliamentary Constituencies for the State of Kelantan [P.U. (B) 212/2013]" (PDF). Attorney General's Chambers of Malaysia. 22 May 2013. Archived from the original (PDF) on 2019-12-29.

Malaysian general election, 2008
Party	Candidate	Votes	%	∆%
PAS	Salahuddin Ayub	27,179	62.17	▲4.61
BN	Ab Ghani Mamat	16,537	37.83	▼4.61
Total valid votes		43,716	100.00	
Total rejected ballots		638		
Unreturned ballots		120		
Turnout		44,474	83.14	▲1.57
Registered electors		53,496		
Majority		10,642	24.34	▲9.22
PAS hold		Swing		

Malaysian general election, 2004
Party	Candidate	Votes	%	∆%
PAS	Salahuddin Ayub	21,430	57.56	▼15.64
BN	Ahmad Rusli Iberahim	15,803	42.44	▲15.64
Total valid votes		37,233	100.00	
Total rejected ballots		1,225		
Unreturned ballots		0		
Turnout		38,458	81.57	▲4.78
Registered electors		47,147		
Majority		5,627	15.12	▼31.28
PAS hold		Swing		

Malaysian general election, 1999
Party	Candidate	Votes	%	∆%
PAS	Husam Musa	25,384	73.20	▲7.68
BN	Siti Jeliha @ Zaleha Hussin	9,293	26.80	▼7.68
Total valid votes		34,677	100.00	
Total rejected ballots		517		
Unreturned ballots		52		
Turnout		35,246	76.79	▲0.85
Registered electors		45,899		
Majority		16,091	46.40	▲15.36
PAS hold		Swing		

Malaysian general election, 1995
Party	Candidate	Votes	%
PAS	Mohamad Sabu	21,377	65.52
BN	Mat Zin Awang	11,252	34.48
Total valid votes		32,629	100.00
Total rejected ballots		921	
Unreturned ballots		104	
Turnout		33,654	75.94
Registered electors		44,316	
Majority		10,125	31.04
This was a new constituency created.
