= 2015 Pan-Malaysian Islamic Party leadership election =

- 1 March 2015 – 4 June 2015
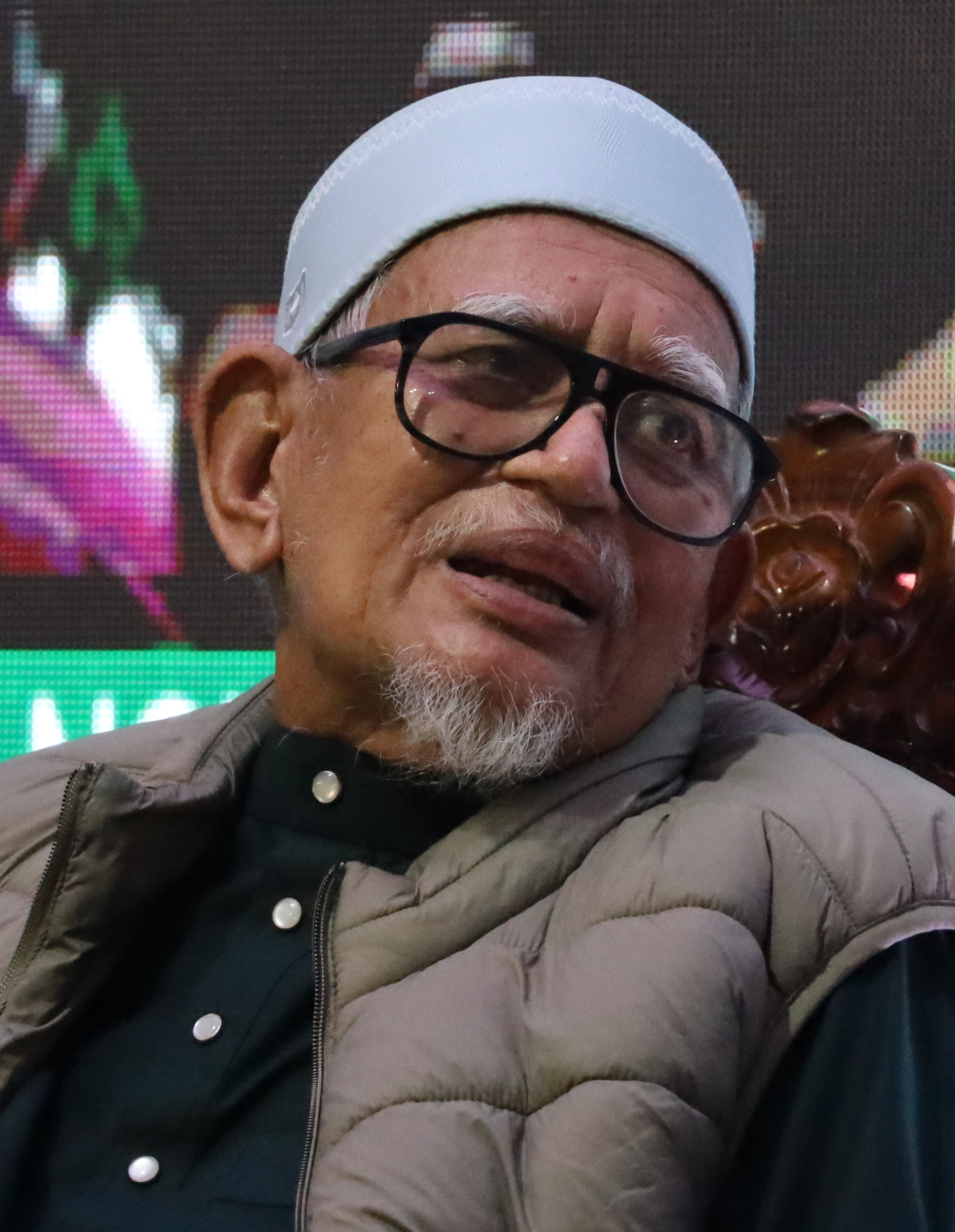
Candidate	Abdul Hadi Awang	Ahmad Awang
Popular vote	928	233
Percentage	79.93%	20.07
President of PAS before election
Abdul Hadi Awang
President of PAS
Abdul Hadi Awang

A leadership election was held by the Pan-Malaysian Islamic Party (PAS) on 4 June 2015. It was won by incumbent President of PAS, Abdul Hadi Awang.

== Timeline ==
- 1 March 2015 – Nominations open
- 30 April 2015 – Nominations close
- 4 June 2015 – Ballots of delegates
- 4 June 2015 – Results announced

== Central Working Committee election results ==
[ Source]

=== Permanent Chairman ===
Candidate	Delegates' votes	Division nominated
Hussin Ismail	won uncontested	

=== Deputy Permanent Chairman ===
Candidate	Delegates' votes	Division nominated
Kamal Ashaari	won uncontested	

=== Auditor ===
Candidate	Delegates' votes (max. 2)	Division nominated
Abdul Syukur Aziz	won uncontested	
Mohd Najib Ahmad	won uncontested	

=== President ===
Candidate	Delegates' votes	Division nominated
Abdul Hadi Awang	928 votes	99
Ahmad Awang	233 votes	5
Husam Musa	withdrawn	8
	did not qualify	

=== Deputy President ===
Candidate	Delegates' votes	Division nominated
Tuan Ibrahim Tuan Man	881 votes	94
Mohamad Sabu	279 votes	12
Mohd Amar Abdullah	withdrawn	3
Husam Musa	withdrawn	
	did not qualify	

=== Vice Presidents ===
Candidate	Delegates' votes (max. 3)	Division nominated
Idris Ahmad	896 votes	79
Mohd Amar Abdullah	710 votes	47
Iskandar Abdul Samad	672 votes	28
Salahuddin Ayub	435 votes	46
Mahfuz Omar	378 votes	39
Husam Musa	317 votes	12
Nasruddin Hassan	withdrawn	42
Tuan Ibrahim Tuan Man	withdrawn	7
Mujahid Yusof Rawa	withdrawn	5
Mohamad Sabu	withdrawn	3
Dzulkefly Ahmad	withdrawn	
Mohamad Noor Mohamad	withdrawn	
	did not qualify	
	did not qualify	
	did not qualify	
	did not qualify	
	did not qualify	

=== Central Working Committee Members ===
Candidate	Delegates' votes (max. 18)	Division nominated
Nasruddin Hassan	782 votes	
Riduan Mohamed Noor	782 votes	
Mohd Nasruddin Daud	777 votes	
Sallehen Mukhyi	763 votes	
Nik Zawawi Salleh	749 votes	
Mohd Khairuddin Aman Razali	736 votes	
Mohamed Fadli Hasan	722 votes	
Abdullah Hussin	679 votes	
Razman Zakaria	674 votes	
Mohd Zuhdi Marzuki	670 votes	
Mokhtar Senik	658 votes	
Zaharuddin Muhammad	611 votes	
Ali Akbar Gulasan	596 votes	
Mazlan Aliman	593 votes	
Rosni Adam	590 votes	
Mohd Noor Mohamad	566 votes	
Muhammad Sanusi Md Nor	556 votes	
Nor Azli Musa	544 votes	
Kamaruzzaman Muhammad	522 votes	
Dzulkefly Ahmad	407 votes	
Amiruddin Hamzah	382 votes	
Mujahid Yusof Rawa	379 votes	
Siti Mariah Mahmud	376 votes	
Mohd Hatta Md Ramli	368 votes	
Mumtaz Md Nawi	354 votes	
Misbahul Munir Masduki	333 votes	
Khalid Samad	332 votes	
Mohamed Hanipa Maidin	332 votes	
Abang Ahmad Kerdee Abang Masagus	331 votes	
Raja Ahmad Iskandar Raja Yaakob	324 votes	
Halimah Ali	323 votes	
Mohammad Nizar Jamaluddin	306 votes	
Abd Ghani Samsudin	297 votes	
Aminolhuda Hassan	272 votes	
Normala Sudirman	246 votes	
Aiman Athirah Aljundi	210 votes	
Muhaimin Sulam	209 votes	
Mohd Abdul Wahid Endut	205 votes	
Azman Shafawi	192 votes	
Zulkifli Mohd Omar	168 votes	
Khairul Faizi Ahmad Kamil	167 votes	
Mohd Taufek Abd Ghani	166 votes	
Lahirul Latigu	147 votes	
Azman Ibrahim	142 votes	
Najmi Ahmad	127 votes	
Nuridah Salleh	119 votes	
Mohd Apandi Mohamad	106 votes	
Ahmad Marzuk Shaary	96 votes	
Ahmad Fakrudin Fakrurazi	95 votes	
Abu Bakar Mohamed	77 votes	
Wan Azhar Wan Ahmad	65 votes	
Zulkifli Ismail	54 votes	
Mokhtar Suhaili	49 votes	
Mohd Arifi Fiazoul	47 votes	
