= National Trust Party (Malaysia) =

Political party in Malaysia

- Abbreviation: AMANAH
- President: Mohamad Sabu
- Secretary-General: Muhammad Faiz Fadzil
- General Advisor: Ahmad Awang
- Deputy President: Mujahid Yusof Rawa
- Vice-President: Dzulkefly Ahmad; Mahfuz Omar; Mohd Hatta Ramli; Siti Mariah Mahmud; Adly Zahari
- Women's Chief: Aiman Athirah Sabu
- Youth Chief: Mohd Hasbie Muda (Pemuda); Masturah Abu Bakar (WARDA)
- Founder: Mohamad Sabu (as AMANAH); Ganga Nayar (as PPPM)
- Founded: January 1978, founded as Malaysian Workers' Party (PPPM); 16 September 2015, re-branded as Parti Amanah Negara (AMANAH)
- Split from: PAS (GHB, 2015); DAP (Ganga Nayar, 1978)
- Headquarters: Wisma AMANAH Negara, No. 73 Tingkat 1, Jalan Seri Utara 1, Seri Utara, 68100 Kuala Lumpur
- Student wing: Mahasiswa AMANAH Nasional
- Youth wing: Pemuda AMANAH Nasional
- Women's wing: Angkatan Wanita AMANAH Nasional (AWAN)
- Women's youth wing: Wanita Muda Amanah (WARDA)
- Membership (2025): ▲200,000
- Ideology: Islamic democracy; Progressivism
- Political position: Centre
- National affiliation: Harakah Keadilan Rakyat (1986); Pakatan Harapan (since 2015) (Note: The party was formerly part of Warisan Plus (2016–2021).); National Unity Government (since 2022)
- Colours: Orange
- Slogan: Amanah, Progresif, Peduli
- Anthem: Lagu Parti Amanah Negara
- Dewan Negara: 2 / 70
- Dewan Rakyat: 8 / 222
- Dewan Undangan Negeri: 10 / 612

Election symbol

Party flag

Website
- amanah.org.my

The National Trust Party (Malay: Parti Amanah Negara, AMANAH) is a political party in Malaysia advocating a reformist strand of political Islam. The party was founded as the Malaysia Workers' Party (Malay: Parti Pekerja-Pekerja Malaysia; abbrev: PPPM) before being taken over in August 2015 by Gerakan Harapan Baru, a group of moderate-to-progressive Islamist leaders from the Pan-Malaysian Islamic Party that had lost a party election. The party was rebranded on 16 September 2015. The party currently has eight elected Members of Parliament. It is one of the three component parties of the incumbent Pakatan Harapan coalition in Malaysia.

== History ==
=== Malaysian Workers' Party (PPPM) ===
The Malaysian Workers' Party (Malay: Parti Pekerja-Pekerja Malaysia) was founded in January 1978 by Ganga Nayar, the first female to head a political party in Malaysia. Nayar was its lone candidate for the 1978 general election in the Sungei Besi parliamentary constituency and the Sungei Way state constituency. She performed poorly and lost her deposits in both contests. Since then, the Workers' Party contested very few Malaysian elections.

The previous party symbol and flag 1978–2015

The symbol or logo of the Workers' Party was the hoe and gear with the dark green background.

The Workers' Party was dormant until it was taken over by Gerakan Harapan Baru on 31 August 2015.

=== Takeover by the Gerakan Harapan Baru ===
In 2015 GHB took over the Workers Party after its attempt to form a new party called Parti Progresif Islam was rejected by the Home Ministry. Gerakan Harapan Baru was given permission to take over the party, with the only condition given by the existing party members that the party would not co-operate with the Barisan Nasional coalition and UMNO.

GHB chief Mohamad Sabu said they would then change the Workers' Party's name to the National Trust Party. Once the Registrar of Societies approved the new name, it was expected that the Amanah party would be launched on 16 September in conjunction with Malaysia Day, with at least 35,000 members.

=== Rebranding to Parti Amanah Negara ===
Malaysian Workers' Party members approved the change of its name to Parti Amanah Negara in an extraordinary general meeting on 8 September 2015, resulting in the change of its logo and flag.

AMANAH was officially launched on 16 September 2015 at the national level, while it was still awaiting the Registrar of Societies' approval. AMANAH is taking over and rebranding the Workers' Party into a new political party spearheaded by progressive leaders, who have left PAS.

The new logo and flag was unveiled at its official launch on 16 September 2015.

== Ideology ==
The ideology of the party is described as progressive Islamism, indicating a commitment to Islamic political ideals but in a more progressive and liberal democratic manner. In addition to common reformist stance and rhetoric held by PH, the party remains socially conservative in line with Sharia law, such as prohibition of liquors and gambling.

The party has stated that Muslims should not force Islamic values on non-Muslims. However, individual members of the party have called for abrogation of any law and court decision should they contradict with Sharia.

== Organisational structure ==
=== Central Leadership Committee (2023–2026) ===
- General Advisor:
  - Ahmad Awang
- Deputy General Advisor:
  - Abdul Ghani Shamsudin
- President:
  - Mohamad Sabu
- Deputy President:
  - Mujahid Yusof Rawa
- Vice-presidents:
  - Dzulkefly Ahmad
  - Mahfuz Omar
  - Mohd Hatta Ramli
  - Siti Mariah Mahmud
  - Adly Zahari
- Women's Chief:
  - Aiman Athirah Sabu
- Women's Deputy Chief:
  - Anfaal Saari
- Youth Chief:
  - Mohd Hasbie Muda
- Youth Deputy Chief:
  - Danial Al Rashid Haron
- Women's Youth Chief:
  - Masturah Abu Bakar
- Women's Deputy Youth Chief:
  - Aishah Mohd Zain
- Secretary-General:
  - Muhammad Faiz Fadzil
- Deputy Secretary-General:
  - Norhayati Bidin
- Treasurer-General:
  - Izham Hashim
- Organising Secretary:
  - Abang Ahmad Kerdee Abang Masagus
- Communications Director:
  - Khalid Abdul Samad
- Elections Director:
  - Mohd Sany Hamzan
- Strategic Director:
  - Ahmad Sabki Yusof
- Human Resources Development Director:
  - Suhaizan Kayat
- Syariah Affairs Director:
  - Hasan Bahrom
- Education and Social Change Director:
  - Azli Yusof
- International Affairs Director:
  - Raja Kamarul Bahrin Shah Raja Ahmad
- Membership Addition Director:
  - Mohd Sofi Abdul Wahab
- Arts and Culture Affairs Director:
  - Wan Anwar Wan Ibrahim
- Parliament Affairs Director:
  - Aminolhuda Hassan
- Mobilization Director:
  - Abbas Azmi
- Consumer and Employees Director:
  - Haris Alimudin
- Welfare, Humanity and Natural Disasters Director:
  - Mariam Abdul Rashid
- Agriculture and Rural Affairs Director:
  - Mohamad Zamir Ghazali
- KANUN / Constitutional & Procedural Amendments Director:
  - Dzulqarnain Lokhman
- Racial Integration Director:
  - Nazri Abdul Rahman
- Central Leadership Committee Members:
  - Ismail Salleh
  - Lahirul Latigu
  - Ahmad Termizi Ramli
  - Asmuni Awi
  - Mohammad Nizar Jamaluddin
  - Ridzwan Abu Bakar
  - Muhaimin Sulam
  - Koh Eng Kee
  - Siti Faridah Abdul Samad
- State Chairpersons:
  - Federal Territories: Khalid Abdul Samad
  - Johor: Aminolhuda Hassan
  - Kedah: Mohd Asmirul Anuar Aris
  - Kelantan: Adly Zahari
  - Melaka: Ashraf Muklis Minghat
  - Negeri Sembilan: Mk Ibrahim Abdul Rahman
  - Pahang: Mohd Fadzli Mohd Ramly
  - Penang: Muhammad Faiz Fadzil
  - Perak: Asmuni Awi
  - Perlis: Wan Kharizal Wan Khazim
  - Sabah: Lahirul Latigu
  - Sarawak: Abang Abdul Halil Abang Naili
  - Selangor: Izham Hashim
  - Terengganu: Mohd Hasbie Muda
- Deputy State Chairpersons:
  - Federal Territories: Hayatul Kamil Termudi
  - Johor: Dzulkefly Ahmad
  - Kedah: Johari Abdullah
  - Kelantan: Abdul Kadir Othman
  - Melaka: Husni Balis Ali
  - Negeri Sembilan:
  - Pahang:
  - Penang:
  - Perak: Ahmad Termizi Ramli
  - Perlis:
  - Sabah:
  - Sarawak:
  - Selangor: Azli Yusof
  - Terengganu: Zukeri Embong

== Leadership ==
President

1. Mohamad Sabu (2015–present)

Deputy President

1. Salahuddin Ayub (2015–2023)
2. Mujahid Yusof Rawa (2023–present)

Women Chief

1. Siti Mariah Mahmud (2015–2018)
2. Aiman Athirah Sabu (2018–present)

Youth Chief

1. Mohd Sany Hamzan (2015–2018)
2. Hasnul Zulkarnain Abdul Munaim (2018–2020)
3. Shazni Munir Mohd Ithnin (2020–2021)
4. Mohd Hasbie Muda (2021–present)

Women Youth Chief

1. Anis Afida Mohd Azli (2017–2019)
2. Nurthaqaffah Nordin (2019–2022)
3. Masturah Abu Bakar (2023–present)

== Elected representatives ==
=== Dewan Negara (Senate) ===
==== Senators ====
- His Majesty's appointee:
  - Mohd Hatta Ramli
  - Mohd Hasbie Muda

=== Dewan Rakyat (House of Representatives) ===
==== Members of Parliament of the 15th Malaysian Parliament ====
AMANAH has 8 members in the House of Representatives:

State	No.	Parliament Constituency	Member	Party
Selangor	P096	Kuala Selangor	Dzulkefly Ahmad	AMANAH
Selangor	P101	Hulu Langat	Mohd Sany Hamzan	AMANAH
Selangor	P108	Shah Alam	Azli Yusof	AMANAH
Selangor	P111	Kota Raja	Mohamad Sabu	AMANAH
Selangor	P113	Sepang	Aiman Athirah Sabu	AMANAH
Malacca	P135	Alor Gajah	Adly Zahari	AMANAH
Johor	P149	Sri Gading	Aminolhuda Hassan	AMANAH
Johor	P161	Pulai	Suhaizan Kayat	AMANAH
Total	Selangor (5), Malacca (1), Johor (2)			

=== Dewan Undangan Negeri (State Legislative Assembly) ===
==== Malaysian State Assembly Representatives ====
Selangor State Legislative Assembly
5 / 56
Penang State Legislative Assembly
1 / 40
Kelantan State Legislative Assembly
1 / 45
Pahang State Legislative Assembly
1 / 47
Johor State Legislative Assembly
1 / 56
Perak State Legislative Assembly
1 / 59
Malacca State Legislative Assembly
0 / 28
Negeri Sembilan State Legislative Assembly
0 / 36
Perlis State Legislative Assembly
0 / 15
Terengganu State Legislative Assembly
0 / 33
Kedah State Legislative Assembly
0 / 36
Sabah State Legislative Assembly
0 / 79
Sarawak State Legislative Assembly
0 / 82

State	No.	Parliament Constituency	No.	State Constituency	Member	Party
Kelantan	P021	Kota Bharu	N09	Kota Lama	Hafidzah Mustakim	AMANAH
Penang	P053	Balik Pulau	N38	Bayan Lepas	Azrul Mahathir Aziz	AMANAH
Perak	P071	Gopeng	N44	Sungai Rapat	Mohammad Nizar Jamaluddin	AMANAH
Pahang			—	Nominated Member	Mohd Fadzli Mohd Ramly	AMANAH
Selangor	P097	Selayang	N15	Taman Templer	Anfaal Saari	AMANAH
Selangor	P100	Pandan	N21	Pandan Indah	Izham Hashim	AMANAH
Selangor	P103	Puchong	N29	Seri Serdang	Abbas Azmi	AMANAH
Selangor	P108	Shah Alam	N41	Batu Tiga	Danial Al Rashid Haron	AMANAH
Selangor	P109	Kapar	N42	Meru	Mariam Abdul Rashid	AMANAH
Johor	P145	Bakri	N13	Simpang Jeram	Nazri Abdul Rahman	AMANAH
Total	Kelantan (1), Penang (1), Perak (1), Pahang (1), Selangor (5), Johor (1)					

== Government offices ==
=== Federal government ===
Portfolio	Office Bearer	Constituency
Minister of Agriculture and Food Security	Mohamad Sabu	Kota Raja
Minister of Health	Dr. Dzulkefly Ahmad	Kuala Selangor

Portfolio	Office Bearer	Constituency
Deputy Minister of Local Government Development	Aiman Athirah Sabu	Sepang
Deputy Minister of Defence	Adly Zahari	Alor Gajah

=== State governments ===
AMANAH currently served as junior partner in several states governed by Pakatan Harapan and Barisan Nasional. It once led Malaccan state government under Pakatan Harapan as result of 2018 general elections

- Selangor (2016–present)
- Negeri Sembilan (2018–2026)
- Penang (2018–present)
- Malacca (2018–2020, 2022–2026)
- Pahang (2022–present)
- Perak (2018–2020, 2022–present)
- Johor (2018–2020)
- Kedah (2018–2020)

Note: bold as Menteri Besar/Chief Minister, italic as junior partner

=== Legislative leadership ===
State	Leader type	Member	State Constituency
Penang	Deputy Speaker	Azrul Mahathir Aziz	Bayan Lepas

== Election results ==
=== General election results ===
Election	Total seats won	Seats contested	Total votes	Voting Percentage	Outcome of election	Election leader
1978 (PPPM)	0 / 154	1			; No representation in Parliament	Ganga Nayar
2018	11 / 222	35	648,087	5.37%	▲11 seats; Governing coalition, later Opposition coalition (Pakatan Harapan)	Mohamad Sabu
2022	8 / 222	54	884,384	5.70%	▼3 seats; Governing coalition (Pakatan Harapan)	Mohamad Sabu

=== State election results ===
State assembly	Election	Votes	%	Seats	Won/contested	+/–	Position (Note: As part of electoral coalition.)	Status
Perlis	2022	7,074	4.8	0 / 15	0 / 5	Steady	2nd (Pakatan Harapan)	No seats
Kedah	2023	60,842	5.2	0 / 36	0 / 9	▼4	▼2nd (Pakatan Harapan)	No seats
Kelantan	2023	39,974	4.7	1 / 45	1 / 7	▲1	3rd (Pakatan Harapan)	Opposition
Terengganu	2023	9,740	1.4	0 / 32	0 / 2	Steady	3rd (Pakatan Harapan)	No seats
Penang	2023	25,880	2.9	1 / 40	1 / 2	▼1	1st (Pakatan Harapan)	PH–BN
Perak	2022	128,560	8.7	1 / 59	1 / 19	▼5	▼2nd (Pakatan Harapan)	BN–PH
Pahang	2022	43,425	5.0	0 / 42	0 / 16	Steady	▼3rd (Pakatan Harapan)	BN–PH (Note: Appointed state assemblyman.)
Selangor	2023	210,430	7.9	5 / 56	5 / 9	▼3	1st (Pakatan Harapan)	PH–BN
Negeri Sembilan	2026	45,386	7.1	0 / 36	0 / 9	▼1	▼2nd (Pakatan Harapan)	No seats
Malacca	2026	28,504	5.8	0 / 28	0 / 7	▼1	2nd (Pakatan Harapan)	No seats
Johor	2026	163,154	8.7	1 / 56	1 / 19	Steady	2nd (Pakatan Harapan)	Balancing force
Sabah	2025	1,405	0.1	0 / 73	0 / 1	Steady	▼6th (Pakatan Harapan)	No seats
Sarawak	2021	3,024	0.4	0 / 82	0 / 8	Steady	▼3rd (Pakatan Harapan)	No seats

Note

State election	State Legislative Assembly													
State election	Perlis	Kedah	Kelantan	Terengganu	Penang	Perak	Pahang	Selangor	Negeri Sembilan	Malacca	Johor	Sabah	Sarawak	Total won / Total contested
2/3 majority	2 / 3	2 / 3	2 / 3	2 / 3	2 / 3	2 / 3	2 / 3	2 / 3	2 / 3	2 / 3	2 / 3	2 / 3	2 / 3	
1978								0 / 33						0 / 1
1982									0 / 24					0 / 1
1986									0 / 28	0 / 20				0 / 4
2016													0 / 82	0 / 13
2018	0 / 15	4 / 36	0 / 45	0 / 32	2 / 40	6 / 59	0 / 42	8 / 56	3 / 36	2 / 28	9 / 56	0 / 60		34 / 587
2020												0 / 73		0 / 1
2021										1 / 28				1 / 9
2021													0 / 82	0 / 8
2022	0 / 15					1 / 59	0 / 42				1 / 56			2 / 56
2023		0 / 36	1 / 45	0 / 32	1 / 40			5 / 56	1 / 36					8 / 31
2025												0 / 73		0 / 1
2026									0 / 36	0 / 28	1 / 56			1 / 35

== See also ==
- List of Islamic political parties
- Category:National Trust Party (Malaysia) politicians
- List of political parties in Malaysia
- Malaysian General Election
- Politics of Malaysia
- Pakatan Harapan
