= Mohamad Sabu =

Malaysian politician

Yang Berhormat Datuk Seri Mohamad Sabu SMW MP
- محمد سابو
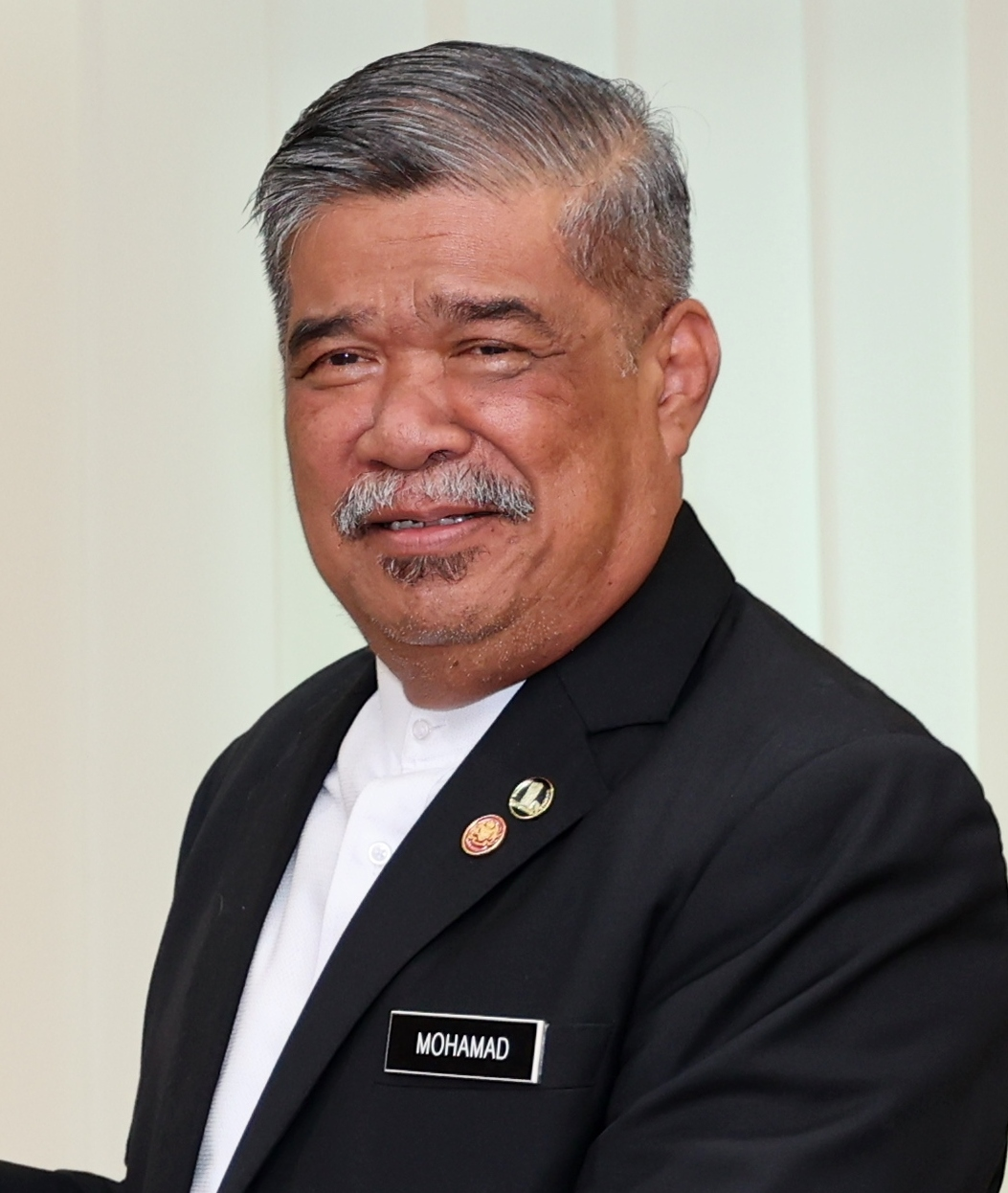
- Mat Sabu in 2023

Minister of Agriculture and Food Security
- Incumbent
- Assumed office 3 December 2022
- Monarchs: Abdullah (2022–2024); Ibrahim Iskandar (2024–present)
- Prime Minister: Anwar Ibrahim
- Deputy: Chan Foong Hin (2022–2023; 2025–present); Arthur Joseph Kurup (2023–2025)
- Preceded by: Ronald Kiandee (Minister of Agriculture and Food Industries)
- Constituency: Kota Raja

Minister of Defence
- In office 21 May 2018 – 24 February 2020
- Monarchs: Muhammad V (2018–2019); Abdullah (2019–2020)
- Prime Minister: Mahathir Mohamad
- Deputy: Liew Chin Tong
- Preceded by: Hishammuddin Hussein
- Succeeded by: Ismail Sabri Yaakob
- Constituency: Kota Raja

1st President of the National Trust Party
- Incumbent
- Assumed office 16 September 2015
- Deputy: Salahuddin Ayub (2015–2023); Mujahid Yusof Rawa (2023–present)
- Preceded by: Position established

Member of the Malaysian Parliament for Kota Raja
- Incumbent
- Assumed office 9 May 2018
- Preceded by: Siti Mariah Mahmud (PR–PAS)
- Majority: 71,142 (2018); 73,998 (2022)

Member of the Malaysian Parliament for Kuala Kedah
- In office 29 November 1999 – 21 March 2004
- Preceded by: Zakaria Mohd Said (BN–UMNO)
- Succeeded by: Hashim Jahaya (BN–UMNO)
- Majority: 991 (1999)

Member of the Malaysian Parliament for Kubang Kerian
- In office 25 April 1995 – 29 November 1999
- Preceded by: Position established
- Succeeded by: Husam Musa (PAS)
- Majority: 10,125 (1995)

Member of the Malaysian Parliament for Nilam Puri
- In office 21 October 1990 – 25 April 1995
- Preceded by: Mat Ali (BN–UMNO)
- Succeeded by: Position abolished
- Majority: 8,139 (1990)

Personal details
- Born: Mohamad bin Sabu; 14 October 1954 (age 72) Tasek Gelugor, Penang, Federation of Malaya (now Malaysia)
- Citizenship: Malaysian
- Party: Malaysian Islamic Party (PAS) (1981–2015); National Trust Party (AMANAH) (2015–present)
- Other political affiliations: Angkatan Perpaduan Ummah (APU) (1990–1996); Barisan Alternatif (BA) (1998–2004); Pakatan Rakyat (PR) (2008–2015); Pakatan Harapan (PH) (2015–present)
- Spouse: Normah Alwi
- Children: 4
- Occupation: Politician
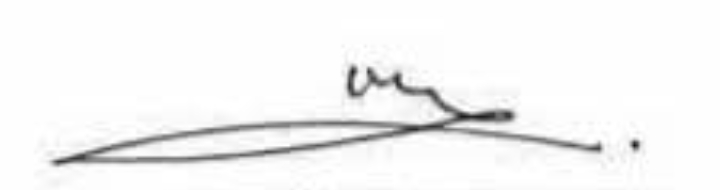
- Signature
- Website: mohamadsabu.com
- Mohamad Sabu on Parliament of Malaysia

Mohamad bin Sabu (Jawi: محمد بن سابو; born 14 October 1954), commonly known as Mat Sabu, is a Malaysian politician who has served as the Minister of Agriculture and Food Security in the Unity Government administration under Prime Minister Anwar Ibrahim since November 2022 and Minister of Defence in the PH administration under former Prime Minister Mahathir Mohamad from May 2018 to the collapse of the PH administration in February 2020. He has served as the Member of Parliament (MP) for Kota Raja since May 2018, Kuala Kedah from November 1999 to March 2004, Kubang Kerian from April 1995 to November 1999 and Nilam Puri from October 1990 to April 1995. He is a member of the National Trust Party (AMANAH), a component party of the PH coalition. He has also served as the 1st and founding President of AMANAH since September 2015.

Mat Sabu is known for his public speaking abilities. He was detained twice under Malaysia's now repealed Internal Security Act (ISA).

== Early life and education ==
Mohamad bin Sabu was born at Tasek Gelugor, Penang, Federation of Malaya on 14 October 1954. Mohamad Sabu has seven siblings, namely Fatimah, Abdullah, Zainab, Sofiah, Mohamad, Kasim and Zaleha. On 17 February 2011, Mat Sabu's mother, Halijah Mat, (91 years old) died at Kampung Guar Petai, Tasek Gelugor, Seberang Perai, Penang. She had suffered three strokes. Her body was held at the Padang Menora Mosque.

Mat Sabu attended Sekolah Menengah Kebangsaan Bukit Mertajam in Penang before continued his studies at MARA Institute of Technology (now Universiti Teknologi MARA; UiTM) in Diploma in Food Technology. However, he did not complete the course and was dismissed due to students' movement circa 1971–1975.

== Political career ==
=== NGO and PAS ===
Mat Sabu's political career began when he joined the Muslim Youth Movement of Malaysia (ABIM) in 1975. He joined PAS in 1981. He had served as Deputy President of PAS, a former component party of the former Pakatan Rakyat (PR) and Barisan Alternatif (BA) opposition coalitions, from 2011 to 2015. He was elected to the party deputy presidency in 2011, running on a moderate platform against the conservative incumbent Nasharudin Mat Isa. He had also served as the party vice-president prior to his election as the party Deputy President. He was the first non-alim elected to the party leadership or deputy presidency in over 25 years.

=== AMANAH ===
On 6 May 2015, Mat Sabu and other progressive PAS leaders (referred to as the G18) were ousted at the 2015 PAS Party leadership election. They then launched Gerakan Harapan Baru (GHB) and took over the dormant Malaysian Workers' Party (PPPM), after their attempt to form a new party called Parti Progresif Islam (PPI) was rejected by the Home Affairs Ministry. GHB was later rebranded as Parti Amanah Negara (AMANAH) with Mat Sabu as its first President.

=== Minister of Defence ===
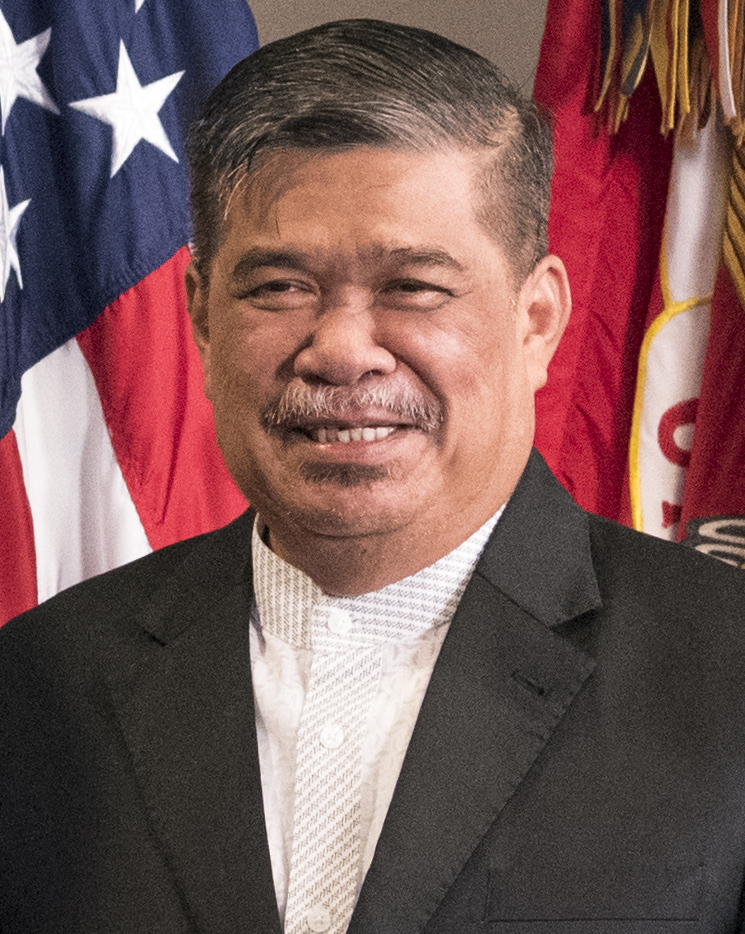
Mat Sabu at The Pentagon in 2018

In the May 2018 general election (GE14), Pakatan Harapan had successfully won to form the new government. On 13 May 2018, Prime Minister Tun Dr Mahathir Mohamad named three key members; Muhyiddin Yassin of BERSATU as Home Minister, Lim Guan Eng of DAP as Finance Minister, while Mat Sabu of AMANAH as Defence Minister in his Cabinet along with a Council of Eminent Persons (CEP).

On 28 June 2018, Mat Sabu announced that Malaysia will withdraw its troops stationed in Saudi Arabia to reflect the country's neutrality in the region.

== Controversies ==
=== Operation Lalang ===
He was detained twice under the Internal Security Act (ISA): from 1984 to 1986 under charges of being involved in extremist movements, and from 1987 to 1989 as a result of Operation Lalang, an operation that remains controversial in Malaysian politics. He was detained in the Kamunting Detention Center together with Lim Kit Siang and his son Lim Guan Eng of the Democratic Action Party (DAP). During his two years in the detention centre, Mat Sabu entered into a friendship with the father and son and defended the duo and their party from accusations of racism in 2017.

=== Statement over the Bukit Kepong incident ===
On 21 August 2011 during a speech in Gelugor, Penang, Mat Sabu stated that it was Muhammad Indera and the 200 Malayan Communist Party (CPM) guerillas who participated in the Bukit Kepong Incident in 1950 who deserved to be proclaimed as national heroes and not the police officers who died defending the Bukit Kepong police station, claiming that the police officers were British officers and the CPM members were the true national heroes as they fought the British. A video of the speech was uploaded on YouTube and received mainly negative responses, as the statement was regarded as an insult to the family members of the deceased policemen, as well as other national heroes not affiliated with the CPM such as the late Prime Minister Tunku Abdul Rahman and UMNO founder Dato' Onn Jaafar.

On 30 August 2011, Karpal Singh, the Bukit Gelugor MP at the time, responded by saying that the 25 policemen who died were true patriots and that Mat Sabu's statements were ill-advised.

However, PAS denied all the allegations and defended Mat Sabu's statement and claims.

On 1 September 2011, Mat Sabu also dispute the services of Sergeant Hassan defending the homeland.

On 20 September 2011, his home was splashed with kerosene and burned. His home in Section 19, Shah Alam was occupied by his son. His wife Normah Alwi (57) took care of his parents who were admitted to Kangar Hospital, Perlis. A police report was lodged at Section 15 of the Police Station, Shah Alam.

On 21 September 2011, Mat Sabu was charged under Section 500 of the Penal Code at the Butterworth Sessions Court for aggravating the image of their police and their families in a talk at Padang Menora on 21 August 2011. Lawyer Mohamed Hanipa Maidin said Mat Sabu was released on bail of RM15,000 until the day of trial. If convicted, Mohamad can be jailed up to two years, or fined or both.

=== Statement about Royal Malaysian Air Force jet fighter ===
On 31 July 2018, Mat Sabu revealed to the press that only four of the Royal Malaysian Air Force (RMAF)'s 18 Russian fighter jets were operational. This revelation was criticized by the veterans organisation Patriot and its president Arshad Raji as improper as it revealed the RMAF's level of preparedness.

== Personal life ==
On 5 January 2019, Mat Sabu's son, Ahmad Saiful Islam Mohamad, was arrested with 100 others for testing positive for drugs in Kuala Lumpur. The case is being investigated under Section 15(1)(A) of the Dangerous Drug Act 1952 for drug abuse. He was convicted on 24 June 2021 but the Kuala Lumpur High Court had on 27 October acquitted him by allowing his appeal to overturn the guilty verdict and eight-month jail sentence over the drug abuse case.

== Election results ==
Parliament of Malaysia
Year	Constituency	Candidate	Votes	Pct	Opponent(s)	Votes	Pct	Ballots cast	Majority	Turnout
1982	P035 Kepala Batas	Mohamad Sabu (PAS)	4,115	16.82%	Abdullah Ahmad Badawi (UMNO)	16,759	68.51%	25,277	12,644	80.29%
1982	P035 Kepala Batas	Mohamad Sabu (PAS)	4,115	16.82%	Khoo Siew Hoe (DAP)	3,589	14.67%	25,277	12,644	80.29%
1986	P041 Permatang Pauh	Mohamad Sabu (PAS)	7,500	29.44%	Anwar Ibrahim (UMNO)	17,979	70.56%	26,098	10,479	74.82%
1990	P022 Nilam Puri	Mohamad Sabu (PAS)	19,596	62.05%	Annuar Musa (UMNO)	11,457	36.28%	32,381	8,139	80.42%
1990	P022 Nilam Puri	Mohamad Sabu (PAS)	19,596	62.05%	Kamarudin (IND)	526	1.67%	32,381	8,139	80.42%
1995	P024 Kubang Kerian	Mohamad Sabu (PAS)	21,377	65.52%	Mat Zin Awang (UMNO)	11,252	34.48%	33,550	10,125	75.74%
1999	P010 Kuala Kedah	Mohamad Sabu (PAS)	23,548	51.04%	Fauzi Abdul Hamid (UMNO)	22,557	48.90%	46,781	991	76.55%
2004	P010 Kuala Kedah	Mohamad Sabu (PAS)	26,493	41.85%	Hashim Jahaya (UMNO)	36,707	57.98%	64,332	10,214	81.65%
2008	P036 Kuala Terengganu	Mohamad Sabu (PAS)	31,934	48.90%	Razali Ismail (UMNO)	32,562	49.87%	66,231	628	82.45%
2008	P036 Kuala Terengganu	Mohamad Sabu (PAS)	31,934	48.90%	Maimun Yusuf (IND)	685	1.05%	66,231	628	82.45%
2013	P011 Pendang	Mohamad Sabu (PAS)	29,527	47.71%	Othman Abdul (UMNO)	32,165	51.97%	62,649	2,638	89.33%
2018	P111 Kota Raja	Mohamad Sabu (AMANAH)	90,697	70.79%	Mohamed Diah Baharun (PAS)	19,555	15.26%	128,126	71,142	86.80%
2018	P111 Kota Raja	Mohamad Sabu (AMANAH)	90,697	70.79%	Gunalan Velu (MIC)	17,874	13.50%	128,126	71,142	86.80%
2022	P111 Kota Raja	Mohamad Sabu (AMANAH)	123,307	62.36%	Mohamed Diah Baharun (PAS)	49,037	24.94%	199,878	74,000	80.81%
2022	P111 Kota Raja	Mohamad Sabu (AMANAH)	123,307	62.36%	Kajendran Doraisamy (MIC)	22,225	11.24%	199,878	74,000	80.81%
2022	P111 Kota Raja	Mohamad Sabu (AMANAH)	123,307	62.36%	Fahmi Bazlan Muda (PEJUANG)	2,063	1.04%	199,878	74,000	80.81%
2022	P111 Kota Raja	Mohamad Sabu (AMANAH)	123,307	62.36%	Che Sara Afiqah Zainul Arif (PRM)	360	0.18%	199,878	74,000	80.81%
2022	P111 Kota Raja	Mohamad Sabu (AMANAH)	123,307	62.36%	P Raveentharan Periasamy (IND)	209	0.11%	199,878	74,000	80.81%
2022	P111 Kota Raja	Mohamad Sabu (AMANAH)	123,307	62.36%	Kumar Karananedi (IND)	163	0.08%	199,878	74,000	80.81%
2022	P111 Kota Raja	Mohamad Sabu (AMANAH)	123,307	62.36%	Surendhar Selvaraju (IND)	109	0.05%	199,878	74,000	80.81%

== Honours ==
=== Honours of Malaysia ===
- Malaysia
  - Recipient of the 17th Yang di-Pertuan Agong Installation Medal (2024)
- Federal Territory (Malaysia)
  - Grand Commander of the Order of the Territorial Crown (SMW) – Datuk Seri (2023)
- Selangor
  - Recipient of the Sultan Sharafuddin Silver Jubilee Medal (2026)

=== Foreign Honours ===
- Russia
  - Medal of Spiritual Unity (2023)

== See also ==
- Pakatan Harapan

== Notes ==
Political offices
Preceded by Ronald Kiandee	Minister of Agriculture and Food Security; 3 December 2022–present	Incumbent
Preceded by Hishammuddin Hussein	Minister of Defence; 21 May 2018–24 February 2020	Succeeded by Ismail Sabri Yaakob
Parliament of Malaysia
Preceded by Siti Mariah Mahmud	Member of Parliament for Kota Raja; 10 May 2018–present	Incumbent
Preceded by Zakaria Mohd. Said	Member of Parliament for Kuala Kedah; 29 November 1999–21 March 2004	Succeeded by Hashim Jahaya
New creation	Member of Parliament for Kubang Kerian; 25 April 1995–29 November 1999	Succeeded by Husam Musa
Preceded by Mohamed Ali	Member of Parliament for Nilam Puri; 21 October 1990–25 April 1995	Constituency abolished
Party political offices
New creation	President of the National Trust Party; 16 September 2015–present	Incumbent
