= Barisan Alternatif =

Alternative Front
- English name: Alternative Front
- Founded: 20 September 1998
- Dissolved: 21 March 2004
- Preceded by: Angkatan Perpaduan Ummah (APU); Gagasan Rakyat (GR)
- Succeeded by: Pakatan Rakyat (PR)
- Membership: People's Justice Party (KEADILAN); Malaysian People's Party (PRM); Democratic Action Party (DAP); Pan-Malaysian Islamic Party (PAS)
- Ideology: Reformism
- Political position: Big-tent

The Alternative Front (Malay: Barisan Alternatif; abbrev: BA) was a coalition of Malaysian opposition parties, formed as a counterweight to the ruling Barisan Nasional. Disbanded after the 2004 general elections, all 4 former component parties of BA (then 3, after a merger of 2 of the parties) formed a new coalition, Pakatan Rakyat, following the 2008 general elections.

== Formation ==
The impetus for the BA's formation was 20 September 1998 arrest and subsequent conviction of former UMNO deputy prime minister Anwar Ibrahim, who had been fired from his government posts and subsequently became the leader of the Reformasi movement against UMNO. On 24 October 1999, the four largest opposition parties—the Islamic Party of Malaysia (PAS), the Democratic Action Party (DAP), the People's Justice Party (Keadilan) and the Malaysian People's Party – announced an electoral alliance and issued a joint manifesto.

In the 1999 general elections, the BA co-operated to contest only one candidate in each constituency. The big winner was PAS, which captured the states of Kelantan and Terengganu and increased its parliamentary seats from 7 to 27. DAP increased its share from 7 to 10 but with two of its most prominent leaders, Lim Kit Siang and Karpal Singh losing their constituencies. This disappointing performance was blamed mostly on its largely Chinese electorate's distrust of the alliance with PAS. The newly formed Keadilan, crippled by the detention of many of its leaders, took only 5 seats. The Barisan Nasional retained a 77% absolute majority with 148 of 193 seats.

== Fragmentation ==
From the very beginning, the alliance had been strained by PAS's unwillingness to publicly renounce its aim of making Malaysia an Islamic state, a position that was anathema to Malaysia's 30% non-Muslim minority.

However, the strain increased after PAS's election victory and the minority parties' realisation that they were losing votes to the fear of an Islamic state. Shortly after the 11 September attacks, the DAP announced its withdrawal from the Barisan Alternatif on 21 September 2001.

The split has led to infighting between the opposition parties in the 2004 general election. As they could not agree in the allocation of seats in each state, many seats had multiple contestants. Ties between Keadilan and PAS were also strained, as was evident in PAS' refusal to support Parti Rakyat Malaysia's bid in the Kota Bharu parliamentary seat.

== Legacy ==
By the 2008 general election however, the main opposition parties has realigned themselves to strategically avoid three-corner contests in the election, eventually leading to a major electoral setback for Barisan Nasional. This alliance was partly due to the PAS's softened approach prior to the elections by focusing on economic issues, criticising BN for dissolving parliament during the Lunar New Year period, and fielding its first non-Muslim candidate. Anwar Ibrahim's role as a highly influential opposition figurehead and his efforts to rally the various opposition parties also helped. Formal resurrection of Barisan Alternatif may take place given the resounding victory which has resulted from the allocation pact between PAS, DAP and PKR.

=== Pakatan Rakyat ===
On 1 April 2008, the leaders of PKR, DAP and PAS announced the new official alliance of Pakatan Rakyat (People's Pact). Together the three parties won 82 of the 222 parliamentary seats at stake in the 2008 Malaysian general election.

== Component Parties ==
- Islamic Party of Malaysia (PAS)
- Democratic Action Party (DAP)
- People's Justice Party (PKR)
- Malaysian People's Party (PRM)

== Elected Representatives ==
- Members of the Dewan Rakyat, 10th Malaysian Parliament
- List of Malaysian State Assembly Representatives (1999–2004)
- Members of the Dewan Rakyat, 11th Malaysian Parliament
- List of Malaysian State Assembly Representatives (2004–08)

== Government offices ==
=== State governments ===
- Kelantan (1998–2004)
- Terengganu (1999–2004)

Note: bold as Menteri Besar/Chief Minister, italic as junior partner

== General election results ==
Election	Total seats won	Total votes	Share of votes	Outcome of election	Election leader
1999	42 / 193	2,667,818	40.23%	▲42 seats; Opposition coalition	Fadzil Noor
2004	8 / 219	1,668,998	24.1%	▼37 seats; Opposition coalition	Kamarudin Jaffar

== State election results ==
State election	State Legislative Assembly													
State election	Perlis State Legislative Assembly	Kedah State Legislative Assembly	Kelantan State Legislative Assembly	Terengganu State Legislative Assembly	Penang State Legislative Assembly	Perak State Legislative Assembly	Pahang State Legislative Assembly	Selangor State Legislative Assembly	Negeri Sembilan State Legislative Assembly	Malacca State Legislative Assembly	Johor State Legislative Assembly	Sabah State Legislative Assembly	Sarawak State Legislative Assembly	Total won / Total contested
1999	3 / 15	12 / 36	41 / 43	28 / 32	3 / 33	8 / 52	8 / 38	6 / 48	0 / 32	4 / 25	0 / 40	0 / 48		
2001													0 / 62	0 / 28
2004	1 / 15	5 / 36	24 / 45	4 / 32	1 / 40	0 / 59	0 / 42	0 / 56	0 / 36	0 / 28	1 / 56	0 / 60		

== See also ==
- Pakatan Rakyat
- List of political parties in Malaysia
- Politics of Malaysia
