= Endorsements in the 2022 Malaysian general election =

This page is a list of individuals and organisations who have endorsed parties or individual candidates for the 2022 Malaysian general election. The final election was won by the Pakatan Harapan coalition led by Anwar Ibrahim.

== Endorsements for parties ==
=== Individuals ===
==== Barisan Nasional ====
- Adham Baba, politician and dropped candidate for re-election
- Adi Putra, actor and singer
- Aliff Syukri, businessman, singer and actor
- Anne Ngasri, actress and politician
- Annuar Musa, politician and dropped candidate for re-election
- Ara Johari, singer and actress
- Mastura Mohd Yazid, politician and dropped candidate for re-election
- Mubarak Majid, actor
- Mustaqim Bahadon, actor and model
- Nasharudin Elias, singer and vocalist
- Rozali Ismail, businessman
- Shahrol Shiro, actor, comedian, television and radio host
- Tajuddin Abdul Rahman, politician and dropped candidate for re-election
- Waytha Moorthy Ponnusamy, lawyer, politician, and President of Malaysian Advancement Party

==== Pakatan Harapan ====
- Afdlin Shauki, actor, comedian, singer, and television presenter
- Aishah, singer and actress
- Altimet, composer, lyricist, actor and singer
- Anifah Aman, politician and President of Love Sabah Party
- Azwan Ali, television host and actor
- Charles Santiago, politician and dropped candidate for re-election
- Farid Kamil, actor, director and screenwriter
- Hans Isaac, actor, producer and director
- Ismawi Zen, academic and lecturer of landscape architecture
- Jamil Osman, academic and professor of Islamic economics
- Jurey Latiff Rosli, director and producer
- MK K-Clique, rapper and actor
- Mohamed Hatta Shaharom, academic
- Mohammad Agus Yusoff, academic and lecturer of political science
- Mohd Azmi Abdul Hamid, academic and activist
- Muhammad Nur Manuty, academic and politician
- Mohd Yusof Othman, academic
- Muhammad Haji Salleh, poet and writer
- Osman Bakar, academic
- Razali Nawawi, academic and former President of Malaysian Islamic Youth Movement (ABIM)
- Redzuan Othman, academic, politician, President and Vice-Chancellor of University of Selangor
- Siti Kasim, human rights lawyer and independent candidate for Batu
- Sufian Suhaimi, singer
- Yasin Sulaiman, singer
- Yonnyboii, rapper

==== Perikatan Nasional ====
- Aeril Zafril, actor and director
- Atiq Azman, actor, singer and model
- Azhar Idrus, Islamic preacher
- Baddrol Bakhtiar, former football player
- Dayangku Intan, singer and politician
- Muhamad Radhi Mat Din, former football player
- Nadir Al-Nuri, humanitarian activist and director-general of Sumud Nusantara
- Norhafizah Musa, academic and Islamic preacher
- Syed Mohd Norhisyam Al-Idrus, Islamic preacher
- Taib Azamudden Md Taib, ulama and politician
- Wadi Annuar, Islamic preacher and educator
- Wan Muhammad Izuddin, ulama
- Zul Huzaimy, actor and director

==== Gerakan Tanah Air ====
- Abdul Hamid Bador, retired police officer and former Inspector-General of Police
- Ahmad Idham, actor, film director and producer
- Eizlan Yusof, actor, director and producer
- Lando Zawawi, actor and activist
- Shah Radhi Hazvee, actor and model

==== Heritage Party ====
- Khir Mohd Noor, actor and director

=== Parties ===
==== Barisan Nasional ====
- Malaysian Advancement Party (MAP)
- Malaysia National Alliance Party (IKATAN)

==== Pakatan Harapan ====
- Love Sabah Party (PCS)
- Malaysian United Democratic Alliance (MUDA)
