= Siddiq Fadzil =

Malaysian Islamic scholar

Yang Berbahagia Profesor Dato' Dr. Siddiq Fadzil DPMP PCM PhD

Chairman of the Board of Directors of Universiti Sains Islam Malaysia
- In office 1 October 2018 – 31 August 2021
- Preceded by: Dzulkifli Abdul Razak
- Succeeded by: Zulkifli Mohamad Al-Bakri

1st President of the Movement for an Informed Society Malaysia
- In office 2005–2015
- Preceded by: Office established
- Succeeded by: Ahmad Azam Ab Rahman

3rd President of the Malaysian Islamic Youth Movement
- In office 1983–1991
- Preceded by: Anwar Ibrahim
- Succeeded by: Muhammad Nur Manuty

Personal details
- Born: Siddiq bin Fadzil; 4 January 1947 Kampung Sungai Tiang Darat, Bagan Datoh, Perak, Malayan Union
- Died: 31 August 2021 (aged 74) An-Nur Specialist Hospital, Bandar Baru Bangi, Selangor, Malaysia
- Resting place: Sungai Ramal Dalam Muslim Cemetery, Kajang, Selangor
- Citizenship: Malaysia
- Spouse: Siti Zulaikha Mohd Nor (m. 1975)
- Children: 7 (including Fadhlina Sidek)
- Education: University of Malaya; National University of Malaysia

Siddiq bin Fadzil (4 January 1947 – 31 August 2021) was a Malaysian academic, social activist, and Islamic scholar. He was a prominent figure in Islamic education and civil society, serving as the third president of the Malaysian Islamic Youth Movement (ABIM) from 1983 to 1991, and later as the founding president of the Movement for an Informed Society Malaysia (WADAH) from 2005 to 2015.

== Early years and education ==
Siddiq Fadzil was born into a family of Javanese descent on 4 January 1947 in Kampung Sungai Tiang Darat, Bagan Datoh, Perak. He attended Sungai Tiang Darat Primary School from 1954 to 1959, before continuing his secondary education at Izzuddin Shah Religious Secondary School in Ipoh, graduating in 1966. He then undertook teacher training at the Language Teachers' College in Lembah Pantai, Kuala Lumpur.

After briefly working as a teacher, Siddiq entered the University of Malaya (UM) in 1971, graduating with a first-class Bachelor of Arts in Islamic Studies in 1974. He subsequently earned a Master of Letters (M.Litt.) in Islamic Thought from the National University of Malaysia (UKM) in 1978. In 1989, he became the inaugural recipient of a Doctor of Philosophy (PhD) in Malay Culture and Islamic Philosophy from UKM’s Institute of Malay Language, Literature, and Culture.

== Career ==
Siddiq began his involvement in student activism during his university studies, serving as president of the National Union of Malaysian Muslim Students (PKPIM) and the University of Malaya Islamic Students Association (PMIUM). In 1974, he joined the academic staff at the National University of Malaysia (UKM) as a lecturer, teaching within the institution until 2001.

In 1983, he succeeded Anwar Ibrahim as the third President of the Malaysian Islamic Youth Movement (ABIM), a position he held until 1991. He subsequently founded the Movement for an Informed Society Malaysia (WADAH) in 2005, serving as national president until 2015 before transitioning to lead its advisory council (Majlis Istisyari). Concurrently, Siddiq held positions as the President of Kolej Dar Al-Hikmah and Chairman of the Civilisation Research Academy (AKK).

From 1992 to 2000, Siddiq was a member of the Perak Islamic Religious Affairs and Malay Customs Council (MAIPk). He also chaired the Panel of the Islamic Consultative Council (MPI) and sat on the management academy panel of the Malaysia Islamic Economic Development Foundation (YAPEIM), where he headed the writing panel for the Pengurusan Tauhidik (Tawhidic Management) module.

In his later academic career, he was appointed an Adjunct Professor at the University of Selangor (UNISEL) and served as the Chairman of the Board of Directors for Institut Darul Ehsan (IDE), becoming the head of its Maqasid Shariah Research Centre. In October 2018, the Ministry of Education appointed him Chairman of the Board of Directors for Universiti Sains Islam Malaysia (USIM), replacing Dzulkifli Abdul Razak. He served a full three-year term in this capacity until August 2021, and was succeeded by Zulkifli Mohamad Al-Bakri.

== Personal life ==
Siddiq married Siti Zalikhah Mohd Nor in 1975. She was a sharia lawyer and legal scholar who led the women's wing of the Malaysian Islamic Youth Movement (ABIM) from 1977 to 1985. The couple resided in Sungai Ramal, Kajang, Selangor, and had seven children. Siti Zalikhah died at the Serdang Hospital on 16 June 2024 at the age of 75.

Their eldest daughter, Fadhlina Sidek, serves as the Minister of Education under the administration of Anwar Ibrahim since December 2022. She was the first woman to hold the position in Malaysian history. Before entering politics, she practiced law through her own sharia law firm, Tetuan Fadhlina Siddiq & Associates, specialising in Islamic family jurisprudence and child welfare. A member of the People's Justice Party (PKR), she leads the party's women's wing, and was elected as the Member of Parliament for Nibong Tebal in November 2022.

== Death ==
Siddiq died from a lung infection at the An-Nur Specialist Hospital in Bandar Baru Bangi, Selangor, on 31 August 2021 at the age of 74. He had been admitted to the intensive care unit (ICU) three days prior after experiencing respiratory and kidney complications that required mechanical ventilation. Following his death, funeral prayers were held at the Al-Umm Mosque in Section 1, Bandar Baru Bangi, and he was buried at the Sungai Ramal Dalam Muslim Cemetery in Kajang, Selangor.

== Honours ==
- Perak
  - Darjah Dato' Paduka Mahkota Perak (DPMP) – Dato' (2001)
  - Darjah Ahli Paduka Cura Si Manja Kini (PCM) (1995)

== Publications ==
- (1971) Sejarah Orang Cina di Tanah Melayu.
- (1977) Kebangkitan Umat: Kenyataan dan Harapan. Kuala Lumpur: Yayasan Dakwah Islamiah Malaysia.
- (1980) Terjemahan Di Bawah Naungan al-Qur’an.
- (1989) Mengangkat Martabat Umat: Koleksi Ucapan Dasar Muktamar Sanawi ABIM. Kuala Lumpur: Dewan Pustaka Islam.
- (1990) The Concern of the Ummah Over the Political Scenario of the ‘90s.
- (1992) Minda Melayu Baru. Kuala Lumpur: Institut Kajian Dasar. ISBN 978-983-884-014-9
- (1993) Melayu Baru: Perubahan dan Kesinambungan.
- (1993) Kepimpinan Melayu Era Perubahan.
- (1993) Tradisi Kesultanan: Perspektif Islam.
- (1993) Islamic Movement in the ‘90s: Vision and Strategy.
- (1998) Jamalal-Din al-Afghani.
- (1999) Islam dalam Sejarah dan Kebudayaan Melayu.
- (1999) Menoleh Sejarah Menyorot Arah.
- (2000) Hassan al-Banna: Kepeloporannya dalam gerakan Reformasi.
- (2001) Pengurusan Tawhidik.
- (2003) Perspektif Qur’ani: Siri Wacana Tematik.
- (2003) Keprihatinan Umat dan Transformasi Sosial: Koleksi Ucapan Dasar Muktamar Sanawi ABIM (with Muhammad Nur Manuty). Kuala Lumpur: ABIM.
- (2005) Pemerkasaan Bangsa: Peranan Kepimpinan Agama dan Budaya.
- (2005) Pengurusan Dalam Islam: Menghayati Prinsip dan Nilai.
- (2006) Kaum Ilmuwan dan Misi Pencerahan. Kajang, Selangor: Kolej Dar al-Hikmah. ISBN 978-967-146-529-5
- (2007) Mensyukuri Nikmat Menginsafi Amanat: Sempena 50 Tahun Merdeka. Kajang, Selangor: Wadah Press Resources, Akademi Kajian Ketamadunan.
- (2009) Pendidikan al-Hikmah dan Misi Pencerahan: Himpunan Pidato Kependidikan Siddiq Fadzil. Kajang, Selangor: Akademi Kajian Ketamadunan, Kolej Dar al-Hikmah. ISBN 978-983-418-726-2
- (2009) Mohammad Natsir: Berdakwah di Jalur Politik, Berpolitik di Jalur Dakwah. Bandar Baru Bangi, Selangor: Wadah Press Resources, Kolej Universiti Islam Antarabangsa Selangor. ISBN 978-983-444-290-3
- (2012) Islam dan Melayu: Martabat Umat dan Daulat Rakyat. Kajang, Selangor: Akademi Kajian Ketamadunan, Kolej Dar al-Hikmah. ISBN 978-967-11110-0-0
- (2013) Memugar Pendidikan Keinsanan. Kajang, Selangor: Akademi Kajian Ketamadunan.
- (2015) Fitnah Seksual dalam Pengkisahan al-Quran: Kuliah Tafsir Maudhuiyy Siri ke-73. Kajang, Selangor: Kolej Dar al-Hikmah.
- (2015) Gagasan Memperkasa Institusi Pendidikan Tinggi Islam (with Abdul Hamid AbuSulayman). The International Institute of Islamic Thought.
- (2015) Sebuah Antologi Puisi: Kesan dan Pesan dari Al-Haramayn. Kajang, Selangor: Akademi Kajian Ketamadunan.
- (2016) Pembinaan Bangsa: Kepelbagaian dalam Bingkai Kesatuan. Kuala Lumpur: Institut Darul Ehsan. ISBN 978-967-140-696-0
- (2016) Yusuf Al-Qaradawiy: Faqih Idealogue Gerakan Islam Kontemporari. Shah Alam, Selangor: Institut Darul Ehsan.
- (2018) Hijrah ke Malaysia Baharu: Mencari Makna di Balik Kata. Shah Alam, Selangor: Institut Darul Ehsan.
- (2018) Pengurusan Berhikmah: Suatu Perbincangan Awal. Kuala Lumpur: Akademi Pengurusan YaPEIM. ISBN 978-967-122-626-1
- (2019) Membina Kesatuan Bangsa: Kerukunan Hidup Bersama Dalam Budaya Damai. Shah Alam, Selangor: Institut Darul Ehsan. ISBN 978-967-206-632-3
- (2020) Islamic Movement's Response to Political Scenario of the '90s. Shah Alam, Selangor: Institut Darul Ehsan. ISBN 978-967-206-638-5
- (2022) Maqasid al-Shariah dalam Ranah Demokrasi. Shah Alam, Selangor: UNISEL Press. ISBN 978-967-258-672-2
- (2022) Fikrah Siddiq Fadzil: Citra Budaya dan Peradaban Melayu-Islam. Kajang, Selangor: Aras Mega. ISBN 978-629-966-112-2
- (2023) Shaykh Muhammad Abduh: Tokoh Gerakan Islah. Shah Alam, Selangor: UNISEL Press. ISBN 978-967-258-674-6
- (2024) Tafsir Mawdhu'iy Siddiq Fadzil: Bicara Al-Quran Tentang Status Kehambaan Manusia. Shah Alam, Selangor: Wadah Press Resources. ISBN 978-629-999-601-9
