= Ahmad Ammar Ahmad Azam =

Islamic activist

- Born: February 15, 1993; Kuala Lumpur, Malaysia
- Died: November 2, 2013 (aged 20); Istanbul, Turkey
- Resting place: Eyüp Cemetery, Istanbul, Turkey
- Education: Royal Military College Marmara University
- Known for: Involvement in Islamic activities in various countries
- Parent: Ahmad Azam Ab Rahman
- Awards: National Maulidur Rasul Award 2014; Selangor Maulidur Rasul Award 2014 (Saidina Ali Category)

Ahmad Ammar bin Ahmad Azam (15 February 1993 – 2 November 2013) was a Malaysian student and social activist based in Turkey. He was known for his involvement in Islamic educational activities and humanitarian work, particularly through his affiliation with the Hayrat Foundation and various non-governmental organisations. The son of Ahmad Azam Abdul Rahman, a former president of the Islamic Youth Movement of Malaysia (ABIM), he pursued higher education in history at Marmara University in Istanbul. After his death in a road accident, he was buried at the historic Eyüp Cemetery in Istanbul, reportedly becoming one of the few foreign nationals to be interred there. His death received widespread attention in both Malaysia and Turkey.

== Education ==
He started his primary education at al-Huda Islamic Elementary School, Gombak before attending Bestari Islamic Middle School, Subang Jaya, in 2006. In 2009, he attended Royal Military College and was commissioned as a Junior Under Officer. In 2010, he scored 9 As in Malaysian Certificate of Education (SPM) and was named the second best student there.

Following his parents' planning, he furthered his studies in Turkey. In 2011, he attended a preparatory programme at Ankara University before attending Marmara University, studying history, in the following year.

== Activities ==
=== Voluntary activities ===
During his studies, he was made a correspondent of World Civilization Finder Group (GPTD) in Turkey. More than that, he involved actively in many community service programmes in various countries, including Cambodia and Indonesia. These including contributions to Rohingya refugees in Malaysia under the support of his beloved mother who is actively involved in humanitarian-based non-governmental organization (NGO) namely Future Global Network and Global Peace Mission Malaysia.

=== Hayrat Foundation ===
His activities with Hayrat Foundation began exactly just after he graduated from his secondary school education. In order to further his studies at Turkey, he stayed with the organization's delegates in Malaysia at the Madrasah Hayrat in order to master Turkish language. While staying with them, he studied the basic of Risale-i Nur in the Turkish language. After mastering the language, his parents sent him to Turkey and he stayed with the Hayrat Foundation.

In 8 months, he managed to end his study over Risale-i Nur and was certified by the foundation. There were also traces of him re-wrote Risale-i Nur in the Ottoman Turkish language using his own writing together with his friends' assistance.

== Death ==
On 2 November 2013 around 1.30 pm, after getting the credential to teach Said Nursî's Risalah an-Nur from Hayrat Foundation, he was expected to teach it to his students in Istanbul. Ammar was hit by an ambulance driver whilst crossing a road and died at the scene.

On the following day, he was being prayed at Eyüp Sultan Mosque and was buried in Eyüp Cemetery in honour of him and on his father's request. He is the first foreigner to be honoured by Turkey to be buried there.

News of his death and his story was widespread in some countries including Malaysia, Turkey and Cambodia. Thousands of peoples send their condolences to his family, including Minister of Foreign Affairs of Turkey, Ahmet Davutoğlu.

== Awards ==
To commemorate his service towards moderate Islam in Malaysia and Turkey, he was conferred 2 awards in conjunction with Maulidur Rasul 1435 celebration. King Abdul Halim awarded him National Maulidur Rasul Award, while Sultan Sharafuddin of Selangor awarded him Saidina Ali Special Award.
