= Muhammad Nur Manuty =

Malaysian politician (1949–2025)

Yang Berbahagia Dato' Dr. Muhammad Nur Manuty DSPN
- محمّد نور مانوتي
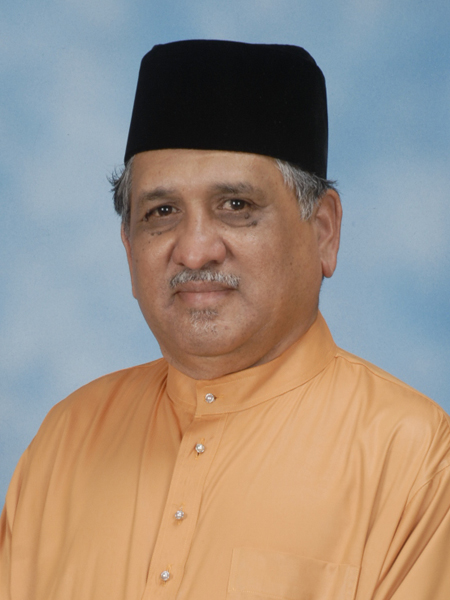

Senator Elected by the Selangor State Legislative Assembly
- In office 17 December 2015 – 16 December 2018 Serving with Chandra Mohan Thambirajah
- Monarchs: Abdul Halim (2015–2016); Muhammad V (2016–2018)
- Prime Minister: Najib Razak (2015–2018); Mahathir Mohamad (2018)
- Preceded by: Syed Husin Ali
- Succeeded by: Yaakob Sapari

5th Chairman of the Institute of Islamic Understanding Malaysia
- In office 8 May 2023 – 26 June 2025
- Minister: Mohd Na'im Mokhtar
- Director-General: Mohamed Azam Mohamed Adil
- Preceded by: Mohd Kamal Hassan
- Succeeded by: Mohd Yusof Othman

4th President of the Malaysian Islamic Youth Movement
- In office 1991–1997
- Preceded by: Siddiq Fadzil
- Succeeded by: Ahmad Azam Ab Rahman

Faction represented in Dewan Negara
- 2015–2018: People's Justice Party

Personal details
- Born: Muhammad Nur bin Manuty; 12 December 1949 Kampung Jelai, Batu Kurau, Perak, Federation of Malaya
- Died: 26 June 2025 (aged 75) Serdang, Selangor, Malaysia
- Resting place: Sungai Tangkas Muslim Cemetery, Kajang, Selangor
- Citizenship: Malaysia
- Party: National Justice Party (KeADILan) (1999–2004); People's Justice Party (PKR) (2004–2025)
- Other political affiliations: Barisan Alternatif (BA) (1999–2004); Pakatan Rakyat (PR) (2008–2015); Pakatan Harapan (PH) (2015–present)
- Spouse: Fauziah Amran
- Children: 5
- Education: National University of Malaysia; Temple University
- Profession: Educator
- Muhammad Nur Manuty on Facebook

Muhammad Nur bin Manuty (12 December 1949 – 26 June 2025) was a Malaysian academician, Islamic scholar and politician. He was the former president of the Malaysian Islamic Youth Movement (ABIM) from 1991 to 1997. A founding member of the People's Justice Party (PKR), he also served as a senator representing Selangor in the Dewan Negara from 2015 to 2018.

== Early life and education ==
Muhammad Nur was born on 12 December 1949, in Kampung Jelai, Batu Kurau, Perak. He pursued his higher education at the National University of Malaysia (UKM), where he became actively involved in the Islamic movement. In the early 1970s, he was elected as secretary-general of the National Union of Malaysian Muslim Students (PKPIM).

== Early career ==
In 1991, Muhammad Nur was elected as president of the Malaysian Islamic Youth Movement (ABIM), a post he held until 1997. During his tenure, he led the organisation through a period of consolidation, strengthening its roles in nation-building and expanding its international engagement. Under his leadership, ABIM championed humanitarian causes, notably advocating for Muslim populations in Bosnia and Herzegovina and in Afghanistan.

=== Academic career ===
Beyond his activism, Muhammad Nur was also an academician, lecturing at several institutions. His appointments included posts at the National University of Malaysia (UKM), the International Islamic University Malaysia (IIUM), Selangor Islamic University (UIS), and the University of Selangor (UNISEL). He presented papers and delivered lectures at major international forums, including the Parliament of the World’s Religions and meetings of the Inter-Parliamentary Union (IPU) in Geneva and Dhaka.

== Political career ==
Muhammad Nur was one of the founding members of the National Justice Party (KeADILan, precursor to PKR), sharing a longstanding association with its founder, Anwar Ibrahim, during their activist years in the Malaysian Islamic Youth Movement (ABIM). Anwar was a founding member who served as president of ABIM from 1974 to 1982, whereas Muhammad Nur would eventually succeed him as president from 1991 to 1997. This foundation cemented a political alliance that guided Muhammad Nur’s role within the broader Reformasi movement.

In 2001, Muhammad Nur contested the deputy presidency of KeADILan as a candidate from the party’s ABIM-aligned Islamic intellectual faction, representing one of the party’s key ideological groups. He received 477 votes, narrowly losing to Abdul Rahman Othman, who won with 521 votes.

Being a native of Perak, both of his candidacies for the Dewan Rakyat were in his home state. He contested the Larut parliamentary seat in the 1999 general election, losing by 4,009 votes against UMNO candidate Raja Ahmad Zainuddin Raja Omar. In 2013, he stood as the PKR candidate for the neighbouring Bagan Serai, narrowly losing against UMNO’s Noor Azmi Ghazali, who won with a 1,140-vote majority.

He was appointed a senator in 2015, representing Selangor in the Dewan Negara during the 13th Malaysian Parliament, serving one term alongside DAP's Chandra Mohan Thambirajah from 17 December 2015 to 16 December 2018.

== Later career ==
Beyond his senatorial term, Muhammad Nur held several prominent administrative positions. He was chairman of the Board of Directors at Sultan Zainal Abidin University (UniSZA) between 1 October 2018 and 30 September 2021. On 8 May 2023, he was appointed as chairman of the Institute of Islamic Understanding Malaysia (IKIM), serving in the position until his death.

== Death ==
Muhammad Nur bin Manuty died at the Sultan Idris Shah Serdang Hospital in Selangor, on 26 June 2025, at the age of 75. His funeral prayer was held at Masjid al-Umm in Bangi, and he was buried at the Sungai Tangkas Muslim Cemetery in Kajang.

== Election results ==
Parliament of Malaysia
Year	Constituency	Candidate	Votes	Pct	Opponent(s)	Votes	Pct	Ballots cast	Majority	Turnout
1999	P053 Larut	Muhammad Nur Manuty (KeADILan)	10,325	41.87%	Raja Ahmad Zainuddin Raja Omar (UMNO)	14,334	58.13%	25,500	4,009	71.76%
2013	P058 Bagan Serai	Muhammad Nur Manuty (PKR)	21,874	48.38%	Noor Azmi Ghazali (UMNO)	23,014	50.90%	46,386	1,140	84.66%
2013	P058 Bagan Serai	Muhammad Nur Manuty (PKR)	21,874	48.38%	Abd Latiff Mas'ud (IND)	329	0.73%	46,386	1,140	84.66%

== Honours ==
- Penang
  - Officer of the Order of the Defender of State (DSPN) – Dato' (2018)

== Publications ==
- Islam dan Demokrasi
- Keprihatinan Umat dan Tranformasi Sosial
- Polemik Isu Kalimah Allah
- Politik dan Kesederhanaan
- Jejak-Jejak Pencerahan Umat

== See also ==
- Members of the Dewan Negara, 13th Malaysian Parliament
- Members of the Dewan Negara, 14th Malaysian Parliament
