= Executioners cemetery =

Type of cemetery from the Ottoman Era

An executioners cemetery (Turkish: Cellat Mezarlığı) is a detached cemetery or separate little burial ground, where the executioners during the Ottoman Era were buried. There are three known executioner graves. One of them is located on the road from Edirnekapı to Ayvansaray in İstanbul, whereas the other one is around the Karyağdı Hill located on the upper side of Piyer Loti Hill in Eyüp Cemetery and recently another one is discovered in the graveyard of Gaysuni Zade Mehmet Efendi Mosque in Beyoğlu Executioners have their own burial site because they were not allowed to be buried in public cemeteries, and they were laid to only three known graveyards in Istanbul, Turkey, and only secretly at night. Their headstones were left blank without any name or date for the purpose of avoiding any retaliation of the families of the executed people and some of these rectangular prism-shaped headstones have cavities on top that resemble alms stones. It is rumored that passers-bys leave money in these holes, the poor people get their share from there and pray for the souls of the dead. Unfortunately, only a few executioner graves survived up to date.
