= Ahmad Azam Ab Rahman =

Malaysian humanitarian and Islamic activist

Yang Berbahagia Dato' Haji Ahmad Azam Ab Rahman DSPN

Special Advisor to the Ministry of Foreign Affairs on Afghanistan
- Incumbent
- Assumed office 2021
- Minister: Saifuddin Abdullah (2021–2022); Zambry Abdul Kadir (2022–2023); Mohamad Hasan (2023–present)

2nd President of the Movement for an Informed Society Malaysia
- Incumbent
- Assumed office 2015
- Preceded by: Siddiq Fadzil

5th President of the Malaysian Islamic Youth Movement
- In office 1997–2005
- Preceded by: Muhammad Nur Manuty
- Succeeded by: Yusri Mohamad

Personal details
- Born: Ahmad Azam bin Abdul Rahman; 21 June 1960 (age 66) Gombak, Selangor, Malaysia
- Citizenship: Malaysia
- Party: National Justice Party (keADILan) (1999–2004)
- Other political affiliations: Barisan Alternatif (BA) (1999–2004)
- Spouse: Nur Azlina Abdul Aziz
- Children: 5 (including Ahmad Ammar Ahmad Azam)
- Education: Indiana State University (BA); Stephen F. Austin State University (MA)

Ahmad Azam Ab Rahman (born 18 July 1960) is a Malaysian humanitarian and Islamic activist. He served as the President of the Malaysian Islamic Youth Movement (ABIM) from 1997 to 2005 and later became the President of Movement for an Informed Society Malaysia (WADAH) in 2015.

Throughout his career, Ahmad Azam has been involved in Islamic non-governmental organisations, international humanitarian aid, and human rights advocacy. From 2019 to 2025, he served as a commissioner on the Independent Permanent Human Rights Commission (IPHRC) of the Organisation of Islamic Cooperation (OIC). Under the Ministry of Foreign Affairs of Malaysia, he was appointed Special Advisor on Afghanistan in 2021, and later Special Advisor on Humanitarian and Reconstruction Affairs. In May 2024, he was appointed Chairman of the Federal Territory Islamic Religious Council Zakat Collection Centre (PPZ-MAIWP).

== Early life and education ==
Ahmad Azam was born on 21 June 1960 in Gombak, Selangor. He received his secondary education at St. John's Institution in Kuala Lumpur and attended the MARA Institute of Technology (ITM), where he obtained a Diploma in Public Administration. He subsequently pursued his higher education in the United States, graduating with a Bachelor of Business Administration from the Indiana State University. He then completed his postgraduate education at Stephen F. Austin State University in Texas, earning a Master of Business Administration (MBA). During his studies, he developed an advanced proficiency in English alongside an intermediate command of Arabic.

== Career ==
=== Early career ===
During the early stages of his career, Ahmad Azam served as a District MARA Officer. He subsequently transitioned into corporate training and human resource development, holding positions as a training manager and training director. He also worked in academia as a lecturer at the Institute of Islamic Studies.

=== Humanitarian work and NGO leadership ===
Ahmad Azam is the founder and former chairman of Global Peace Mission (GPM) Malaysia, a major national humanitarian agency that has executed relief missions across more than 30 countries since 2001. He began his civil society career with the Malaysian Islamic Youth Movement (ABIM), serving as its secretary-general before being unanimously elected as the organisation's fifth president on 13 September 1997. He held the presidency for eight years until September 2005. Following his tenure at ABIM, he continued his activism through the Movement for an Informed Society Malaysia (WADAH), eventually becoming its second president in 2015. Furthermore, he heads the Future Global Islamic Network Association (JREC), an organisation that manages six refugee schools educating over 800 students with the support of the United Nations High Commissioner for Refugees (UNHCR). At the international level, he is active within transnational Islamic NGO networks. He serves as a member of the Council of Advisors for the Union of NGOs of the Islamic World (UNIW) and previously held office as the UNIW Deputy Secretary-General for the Asia-Pacific region from 2015 to 2021.

=== Human rights and advisory roles ===
Ahmad Azam represented Malaysia as a commissioner on the Independent Permanent Human Rights Commission (IPHRC) of the Organisation of Islamic Cooperation (OIC) for two consecutive terms spanning 2019–2022 and 2022–2025. During his tenure, he played a central role in organising the 8th OIC-IPHRC International Seminar held in Kuala Lumpur. He was also a member of the Consultative Council on Foreign Policy (CCFP) under the Malaysian government. He has been extensively involved in diplomatic advisory capacities for the Malaysian Ministry of Foreign Affairs. Azam was appointed as the Special Advisor to the Minister of Foreign Affairs on Afghanistan from 2021 to 2022. Following this, he was appointed as the Special Advisor on Humanitarian and Reconstruction Affairs for the 2023–2026 term, where he provides the government with policy counsel and facilitated humanitarian coordination. In May 2026, the government appointed him Chairman of the Federal Territory Islamic Religious Council Zakat Collection Centre (PPZ-MAIWP).

== Political career ==
Ahmad Azam was actively involved in the internal politics of the National Justice Party (KeADILan), the predecessor to the People's Justice Party (PKR). During his tenure as the president of the Malaysian Islamic Youth Movement (ABIM), he led a prominent faction of ABIM-linked members within the party.

Around 2001, ideological differences led to severe friction between the ABIM faction and other groups within KeADILan. The discord centred on the proposed merger between KeADILan and the socialist Malaysian People's Party (PRM), a move heavily championed by certain leadership circles but firmly opposed by the ABIM faction. During the party's annual general meeting, the dispute escalated into intense internal criticism, with members of the ABIM faction facing what they characterised as targeted antagonism and being labelled as disruptive elements within the party. Ahmad Azam later remarked that their anti-merger stance resulted in the ABIM delegation being almost entirely marginalised, prompting the faction to consider withdrawing from the party altogether.

Despite the internal strife, Ahmad Azam maintained significant influence within the movement. Following the party's internal elections, four ABIM-aligned members were offered appointed seats on KeADILan's supreme council. However, they chose to decline the appointments, a decision that Ahmad Azam publicly supported. He subsequently declined invitations to hold formal talks with senior party leadership regarding the faction's grievances, stating he did not want to be seen as interfering in KeADILan's affairs.

== Personal life ==
Ahmad Azam is married to Nur Azlina Abdul Aziz, a social activist specialising in the education of refugee children. The couple has five children and six grandchildren.

Their fourth child and only son, Ahmad Ammar Ahmad Azam, was a student and Islamic activist based in Turkey. He died in a road accident in Istanbul on 2 November 2013 at the age of 20, while studying history at Marmara University. Following his death, he received widespread public attention in Malaysia and was posthumously awarded the federal-level Anugerah Maulidur Rasul in 2014. He was buried at the Eyüp Cemetery in Istanbul.

== Honours ==
- Penang
  - Darjah Setia Pangkuan Negeri (D.S.P.N.) – Dato' (2021)
- Cambodia
  - Royal Order of the Kingdom of Cambodia – Commander (2012)
  - Royal Order of Monisaraphon – Moha Sena / Grand Officer (2015)

== Publications ==
- (1991) Muktamar Sanawi ke-27: Memugar Idealisme Perjuangan. Kuala Lumpur: ABIM.
- (2008) Memimpin Belia Islam: Menangani Globalisasi & Hegemoni. Kuala Lumpur: Blue-T Publication. ISBN 978-983-3811-98-4
- (2017) Erdogan Bukan Pejuang Islam? (with Najmuddin Mohd Nawi, Muhammad Suhail Ahmad). Batu Caves, Selangor: PTS Publishing House. ISBN 978-967-411-904-1
