= KUIS =

KUIS may refer to:

- Kanda University of International Studies
- Kolej Universiti Islam Antarabangsa Selangor
