= Mohd Khairuddin Othman =

Malaysian politician

Dr. Mohd Khairuddin Othman
- محمد خيرالدين بن عثمان

Director General of the Community Communications Department
- In office 1 March 2024 – 24 September 2024
- Minister: Fahmi Fadzil
- Preceded by: Mohammad Agus Yusoff
- Succeeded by: Ismail Yusop

Member of the Selangor State Executive Council (Human Capital, Young Generations and Sports Development)
- In office 10 December 2018 – 21 August 2023
- Monarch: Sharafuddin
- Menteri Besar: Amirudin Shari
- Preceded by: Shaharuddin Badaruddin (Human Capital Development); Amirudin Shari (Empowerment of Youth and Sports)
- Succeeded by: Amirudin Shari (Menteri Besar, Human Capital Development); Najwan Halimi (Empowerment of Youth and Sports)
- Constituency: Paya Jaras

Deputy Speaker of the Selangor State Legislative Assembly
- In office 26 June 2018 – 10 December 2018
- Monarch: Sharafuddin
- Menteri Besar: Amirudin Shari
- Speaker: Ng Suee Lim
- Preceded by: Mohd Shafie Ngah
- Succeeded by: Daroyah Alwi
- Constituency: Paya Jaras

Member of the Selangor State Legislative Assembly for Paya Jaras
- In office 5 May 2013 – 12 August 2023
- Preceded by: Muhammad Bushro Mat Johor (BN–UMNO)
- Succeeded by: Ab Halim Tamuri (PN–PAS)
- Majority: 5,522 (2013); 12,072 (2018)

Faction represented in Selangor State Legislative Assembly
- 2008–2018: Malaysian Islamic Party
- 2018–2023: Pakatan Harapan

Personal details
- Born: Mohd Khairuddin bin Othman; 20 September 1971 (age 54) Selangor, Malaysia
- Party: Malaysian Islamic Party (PAS) (–2015); People's Justice Party (PKR) (since 2015)
- Other political affiliations: Pakatan Rakyat (PR) (2008–2015); Pakatan Harapan (PH) (since 2015)
- Occupation: Politician

Dr. Mohd Khairuddin Othman (born 20 September 1971) is a Malaysian politician who served as Director General of the Community Communications Department (J-KOM) from March 2024 to his removal from the position in September 2024, Member of the Selangor State Executive Council (EXCO) in the Pakatan Harapan (PH) state administration under Menteri Besar Amirudin Shari from December 2018 to August 2023, Deputy Speaker of the Selangor State Legislative Assembly from June to December 2018 and Member of the Selangor State Legislative Assembly (MLA) for Paya Jaras from May 2013 to August 2023. He is a member of the People's Justice Party (PKR), a component party of the PH coalition and was a member of the Malaysian Islamic Party (PAS), a component party of the Pakatan Rakyat (PR) coalition. He is also the State Secretary of PH of Selangor.

== Election results ==
Selangor State Legislative Assembly
Year	Constituency	Candidate	Votes	Pct	Opponent(s)	Votes	Pct	Ballots cast	Majority	Turnout
2008	N38 Paya Jaras	Mohd Khairuddin Othman (PAS)	10,879	48.57%	Muhammad Bushro Mat Johor (UMNO)	11,521	51.43%	22,883	642	78.47%
2013	N38 Paya Jaras	Mohd Khairuddin Othman (PAS)	21,808	57.25%	Muhammad Bushro Mat Johor (UMNO)	16,286	42.75%	38,571	5,522	88.70%
2018	N38 Paya Jaras	Mohd Khairuddin Othman (PKR)	20,376	58.68%	Zein Isma Ismail (UMNO)	8,304	23.92%	35,115	12,072	87.20%
2018	N38 Paya Jaras	Mohd Khairuddin Othman (PKR)	20,376	58.68%	Hanafi Zulkapli (PAS)	6,042	17.40%	35,115	12,072	87.20%
2023	N38 Paya Jaras	Mohd Khairuddin Othman (PKR)	25,541	47.91%	Ab Halim Tamuri (PAS)	27,527	51.63%	53,313	1,986	73.47%
2023	N38 Paya Jaras	Mohd Khairuddin Othman (PKR)	25,541	47.91%	Nurhaslinda Basri (IND)	245	0.46%	53,313	1,986	73.47%
