= Institute of Islamic Understanding Malaysia =

Malaysian government agency

- Institut Kefahaman Islam Malaysia اينستيتوت کفهامن إسلام مليسيا
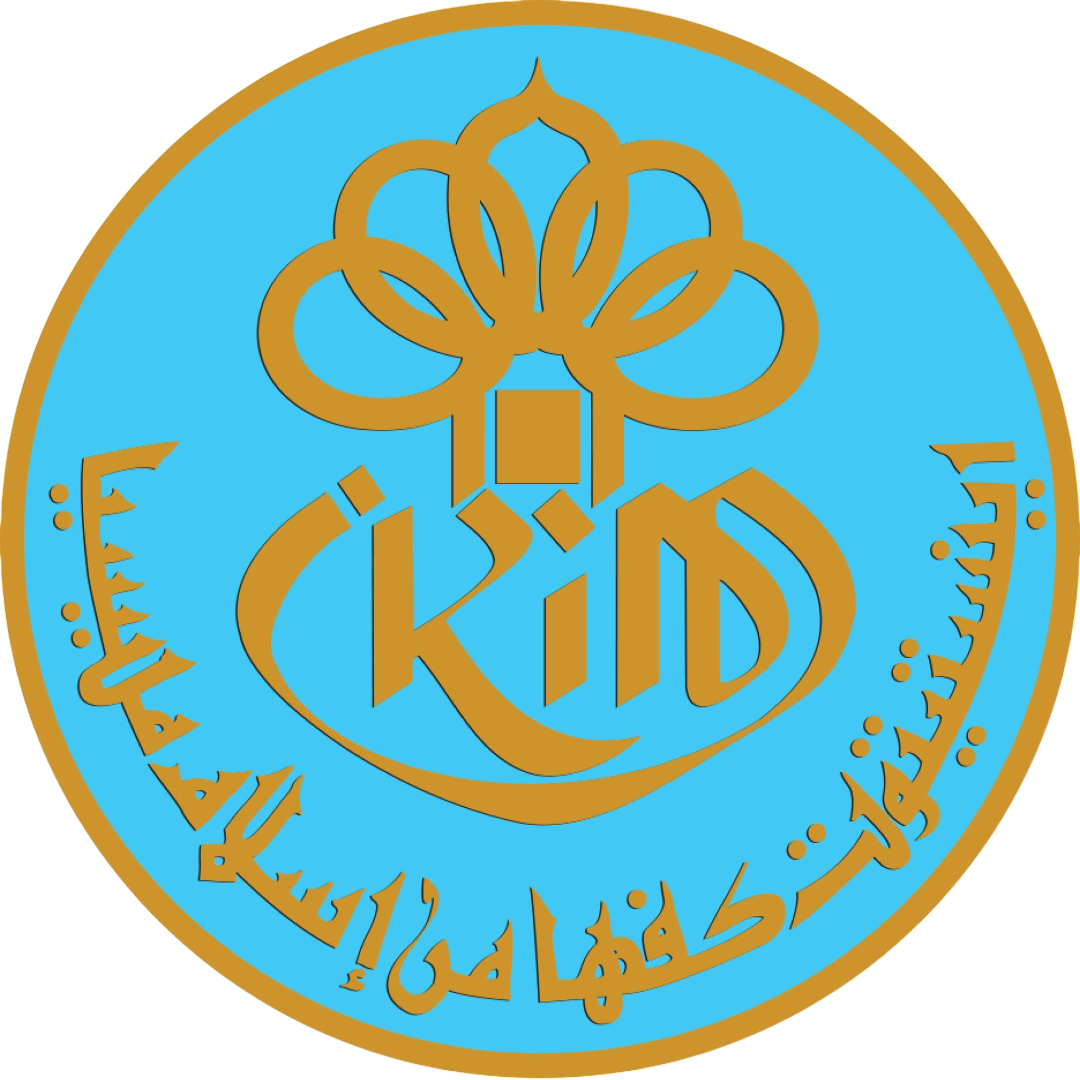

Agency overview
- Formed: 18 February 1992; 34 years ago
- Jurisdiction: Government of Malaysia
- Headquarters: No. 2, Langgak Tunku Off Jalan Tuanku Abdul Halim, 50480 Kuala Lumpur
- Motto: "Memahami Islam, Membina Peradaban" ("Understanding Islam, Builds Civilization")
- Minister responsible: Zulkifli Hasan, Minister in the Prime Minister's Department (Religious Affairs)
- Agency executive: Prof. Madya Dato' Dr. Mohamed Azam Mohamed Adil, Director-General
- Parent agency: Prime Minister's Department
- Website: www.ikim.gov.my

The Institute of Islamic Understanding Malaysia (Malay: Institut Kefahaman Islam Malaysia; Jawi: اينستيتوت کفهامن إسلام مليسيا; officially abbreviated as IKIM) is a Malaysian Islamic organisation and a government agency under the Prime Minister's Department. Established in 1992, its role is to provide an accurate understanding of Islam and conducts in-depth studies on Islamic teachings and interpretations. It also operates its own radio station, IKIMfm.

== History ==
The idea for IKIM was first proposed by the then-fourth Prime Minister, Mahathir Mohamad when he expressed his intent to set up a think tank dedicated to and responsible for improving the Islamic understanding amongst Malaysians.

His idea led to the establishment of IKIM on 18 February 1992 as a company limited by guarantee under the currently-repealed 1965 Companies Act with the aim to provide an accurate understanding of Islam through various programs and activities such as research, seminars, workshops, forums, consultations, training and publications. Its goal is to provide a true Islamic understanding while maintain the purity of true Islamic teachings without touching on rhetorical matters or deviating from the right path and improved the Islamic understanding among Muslims and non-Muslims in Malaysia.

It began operations on 3 July 1992 and officiated by Mahathir at the Tun Hussein Onn Hall, the Putra World Trade Centre (PWTC), Kuala Lumpur. The Chief Secretary to the Government of Malaysia, Ahmad Sarji Abdul Hamid become its first Chairman, while the International Islamic University Malaysia (IIUM) professor, Ismail Ibrahim become its first Director-General. Upon its establishment, IKIM organised the two-day congress, Towards the 21st Century: Islam and Vision 2020, also held at the PWTC.

=== Headquarters ===
When IKIM was first established in 1992, its headquarters were proposed to be operated at the government house building on Jalan Lapangan Terbang Lama, Sungai Besi, but it rented and occupied space in Damansara Town Centre, Kuala Lumpur to be used as a temporary office. Since the land in Sungai Besi was not suitable to be occupied, IKIM was allocated a new site in Jalan Duta, Kuala Lumpur covering an area of approximately seven acres. Construction of its headquarters began at the end of 1992 and cost RM7.3 million and was fully completed in January 1994. IKIM moved to its current headquarters at Jalan Langgak Tunku, off Jalan Duta and was officiated by Mahathir.

== Leadership ==
=== Chairman ===
No.	Name	Took office	Left office
1.	Ahmad Sarji Abdul Hamid	15 March 1992	31 August 2009
2.	Abdullah Ahmad Badawi	1 September 2009	31 August 2018
3.	Ahmad Sarji Abdul Hamid	4 February 2019	28 August 2021
4.	Mohd Kamal Hassan	24 February 2022	7 May 2023
5.	Muhammad Nur Manuty	8 May 2023	26 June 2025

=== Director-General ===
No.	Name	Took office	Left office
1.	Ismail Ibrahim	16 April 1992	31 March 2002
2.	Abdul Monir Yaacob	1 April 2002	31 May 2005
3.	Syed Ali Tawfik Al-Attas	1 June 2005	1 August 2009
4.	Nik Mustapha Nik Hassan	2 August 2009	31 August 2015
5.	Azizan Baharuddin	1 September 2015	31 August 2021
6.	Mohamed Azam Mohd Adil	3 February 2022	present

== Publications ==
IKIM, through its publishing arm, Penerbit IKIM, is responsible for the publication of books, journals and other works in Malay and English by the institute's researchers. Its publishing works are published in newspapers and magazines and are available in electronic and print versions, through the bookstore located within the institute and the IKIM Niaga website.

== See also ==
- Islam in Malaysia
