= Syed Arabi Idid =

Malaysian academic (born 1944)

Yang Berbahagia Prof. Dato' Sri Dr. Syed Arabi Idid SSAP DGMK DSDK AMK

4th Rector of the International Islamic University Malaysia
- In office 1 June 2006 – 1 June 2011
- Chancellor: Ahmad Shah
- Preceded by: Prof. Emeritus Dr. Mohd. Kamal Hassan
- Succeeded by: Prof. Dr. Zaleha Kamarudin

Personal details
- Born: 28 September 1944 (age 82) Alor Setar, Kedah, Japanese Malaya
- Education: University of Malaya; University of Wisconsin–Madison
- Occupation: Communication specialist

Syed Arabi bin Syed Abdullah Idid (born on 28 September 1944 at Alor Setar, Kedah, Malaysia) is a Malaysian scholar who serves as a Professor of Communication at the International Islamic University Malaysia (IIUM). He was the Rector of IIUM from 1 June 2006 to 1 August 2011.

== Education background ==
Syed Arabi Idid obtained primary education at Ibrahim School , Sungai Petani and secondary education at Sultan Abdul Hamid College at Alor Setar. He furthered his study at the University of Malaya and obtained the degree of Bachelor of Arts in History in 1968. In 1976, he was awarded with the degree of Master of Arts in Journalism from the University of Wisconsin–Madison. Ten years later, he graduated from the same as a Doctor of Philosophy in Mass Communication.

== Career ==
He started his career as a journalist in Bernama from 1968 to 1971. He then joined National University of Malaysia (UKM) as an administrative officer and later as a lecturer. He remained at UKM until he joined IIUM as a professor in 1999. He was the Registrar of UKM from 1978 to 1981.

Prior to his rectory in IIUM, he served as the Dean of Research Management Centre from 2001 to 2006. On 1 June 2006, he succeeded Professor Emeritus Tan Sri Dr. Mohd. Kamal Hassan as the fourth Rector of IIUM. He served such office until 1 August 2011.

== Honours ==
- Kedah
  - Member of the Order of the Crown of Kedah (AMK) (1990)
  - Knight Companion of the Order of Loyalty to the Royal House of Kedah (DSDK) – Dato' (2000)
  - Knight Commander of the Glorious Order of the Crown of Kedah (DGMK) – Dato' Wira (2011)
- Pahang
  - Grand Knight of the Order of Sultan Ahmad Shah of Pahang (SSAP) – Dato' Sri (2008)
