= Abdul Razak Abdul Hamid =

Only Malaysian survivor of Hiroshima

- Born: 7 July 1925; Penang, British Malaya
- Died: 18 July 2013 (aged 88); Kuala Lumpur, Malaysia
- Resting place: Muslim Cemetery, Taman Ibukota, Setapak, Kuala Lumpur
- Other name: Razak-sensei
- Education: Hiroshima University
- Occupations: Academic, professor
- Known for: Sole Malaysian survivor of the atomic bombing of Hiroshima
- Notable work: Debu Hiroshima
- Children: 3, including Dzulkifli Abdul Razak
- Awards: Japan Foundation Special Prize (1995)

Abdul Razak Abdul Hamid (7 July 1925 – 18 July 2013) was a Malaysian academic and the only Malaysian survivor of the atomic bombing of Hiroshima on 6 August 1945. A prominent professor of the Japanese language, he was nicknamed "Razak-sensei" by friends and university students.

== Biography ==
Abdul Razak was born on 7 July 1925, in Penang, British Malaya. In 1943, Abdul Razak, along with two other Malaysian students were chosen to study in Japan for a degree in education. Abdul Razak spent one year at the International Student Institute in Tokyo beginning in 1943. He then transferred to Hiroshima, where he planned to study for four years.

=== At Hiroshima ===
In 1945, Abdul Razak was a 19-year-old student attending Hiroshima Bunri University, which is now part of the present-day Hiroshima University, as part of the "Greater East Asia Co-prosperity programme." He had been in Hiroshima for just seven months at the time of the atomic bombing. Abdul Razak was at a university lecture in a classroom on 6 August 1945, when the atomic bomb was dropped on Hiroshima just 1.5 km from his location. Abdul Razak lost consciousness as the building collapsed on top of him, and he awoke to massive destruction. He and another classmate, Yura Halim of Brunei, managed to survive the aftermath of the bombing. A third Southeast Asian student, Hasan Rahaya, who became an Indonesian politician, also survived. Razak, Halim, and Rahaya were the only Southeast Asian students to survive the Hiroshima bombing.

Abdul Razak was the sole Malaysian survivor of the bombing. (The Japanese government has recognised approximately 1,760 foreigners as survivors of the Hiroshima atomic bombing, the majority of whom are Korean.) Two other Malaysian students who had been studying with Abdul Razak, Nik Yusof and Syed Omar, died in aftermath of the bombing. Abdul Razak was forced to abandon the city and suspend his studies in the aftermath. They and other survivors waited in the open for ten days before they were found and brought to Tokyo for medical treatment.

=== After the war ===
Abdul Razak became a professor of Japanese studies and strong proponent of the Japanese language and culture. In 1982, Abdul Razak was appointed the head of Malaysia's Look East Policy by Prime Minister Mahathir Mohamad. He also created the Japanese language program for the Centre of Preparatory Education at Institut Teknologi Mara, now known as the present-day Universiti Teknologi MARA in Shah Alam. Abdul Razak taught intensive courses on the Japanese language and culture to thousands of Malaysian students, including many who studied abroad in Japan.

In 1995, Abdul Razak was awarded the Japan Foundation Special Prize in a ceremony attended by Emperor Akihito and Empress Michiko. The attendance of the Emperor and Empress at the ceremony was regarded as a rare honour.

In February 2013, Abdul Razak received an honorary doctorate from his alma mater, Hiroshima University, for his efforts to promote positive Japan–Malaysia relations and dedication to the Japanese language and culture. Two other foreign Hiroshima survivors also received honorary doctorates at the ceremony with Abdul Razak: the former Chief Minister of Brunei Pengiran Yusuf Abdul Rahim who was 91 years old at the time, and Hasan Rahaya, a former member of the People's Consultative Assembly of Indonesia, who was also 91 years old at the time of the ceremony. Abdul Razak, Yusuf and Rahaya were all the sole survivors of the atomic bombing of Hiroshima from their respective countries.

=== Death ===
Abdul Razak died at Kuala Lumpur Hospital in Kuala Lumpur, Malaysia, on 18 July 2013, at the age of 88. Abdul Razak, who was a resident of Taman Kamariah, Gombak, Selangor, was survived by his three children, including the Rector of the International Islamic University Malaysia, Professor Tan Sri Dato' Dzulkifli Abdul Razak. He was buried in the Muslim Cemetery in Taman Ibukota in Setapak, Kuala Lumpur.

== Appearances ==
Abdul Razak and one of his university students, Othman Puteh, co-wrote a book titled Debu Hiroshima ("Ashes of Hiroshima"), based on Abdul Razak's recollections of the bombing and information he had collected on Hiroshima since the 1940s. Debu Hiroshima was published by Dewan Bahasa dan Pustaka in 1987. Abdul Razak was also interviewed for an NHK documentary on survivors of Hiroshima, Japan In My Mind (Heart), which first aired in Japan on 6 August 1988.
