= IKIMfm =

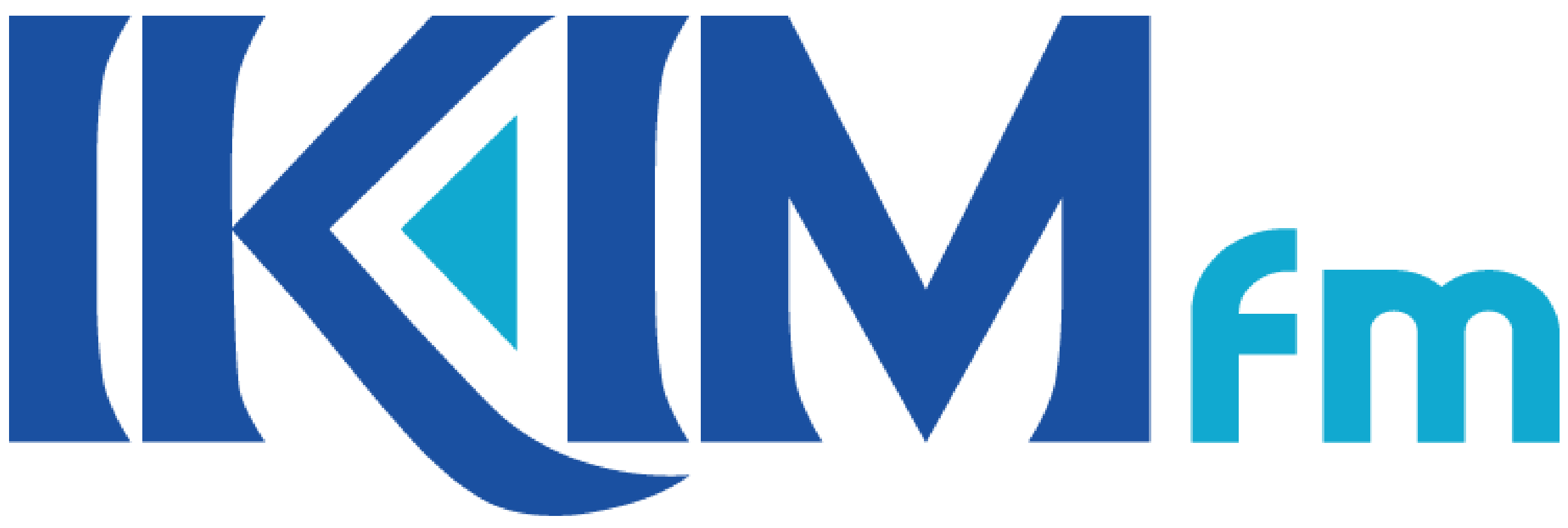
- Kuala Lumpur; Malaysia
- Broadcast area: Malaysia, Singapore, and Indonesia
- Frequency: Varies depending on its region

Programming
- Languages: Malay (main), English and Arabic
- Format: Islamic radio

Ownership
- Owner: Institute of Islamic Understanding Malaysia

History
- First air date: 6 July 2001; 25 years ago
- Former names: IKIM.fm (2001–2019); Radio IKIM (2019–2023)

Links
- Website: ikimfm.my

IKIMfm (formerly known as IKIM.fm and Radio IKIM) is a Malaysian radio station owned and operated by the Institute of Islamic Understanding Malaysia (IKIM). Launched in 2001, it is the first Islamic radio station in Malaysia that operates for 24 hours.

== History ==
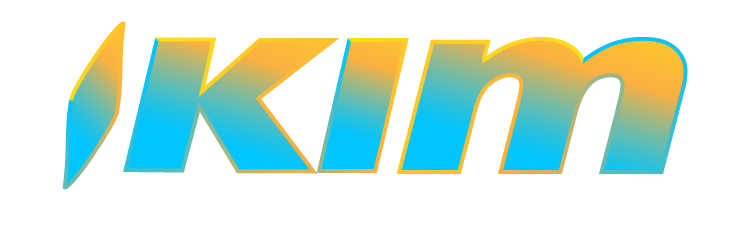
IKIMfm logo, used from 2019 to 2024, when it was known as Radio IKIM.

IKIM was previously responsible for the joint operation of RTM's Suara Islam. In 1998, IKIM proposed its intent to operate its own radio station in 1998, which received approval from the Ministry of Information and focused on Islamic content to be broadcast nationwide.

The launch of IKIMfm was announced in June 2001, with its trial broadcast beginning on 12 June. Malaysian telecommunications company, Celcom was commissioned to operate IKIMfm's operation and broadcast.

It was officially launched by the then Prime Minister, YAB Tun Dr. Mahathir Mohamad on 6 July 2001.

Radio IKIM is transmitted using the frequency of 91.5 MHz (in the Klang Valley) and transmitted nationwide. Radio IKIM can also be heard in Singapore, the Batam islands in Indonesia, Brunei and southern Thailand (Satun, Songkhla, and Narathiwat). The frequency of this radio station was formerly used by RFM (now Red FM), before switching to 104.9 MHz (in the Klang Valley) in early 2000. Radio IKIM can also be followed online through its website.

In 2002, the frequency of Radio IKIM in Johor Bahru transmitted from Gunung Pulai was changed from 107.9 MHz to 106.2 MHz.

In the 2010s, Radio IKIM expanded its broadcasts to Miri on FM 104.0 MHz, Lahad Datu on FM 107.3 MHz and Tawau on FM 100.7 MHz to target Muslim listeners in the states of Sarawak and Sabah. In addition, Radio IKIM added a transmitter in Balik Pulau, Penang at 102.7 MHz to cover the southwestern area of Penang where the Gunung Jerai FM 89.0 MHz transmitter cannot be received in that area.

In 2016, the frequency of Radio IKIM in Kuching was changed to FM 93.7 MHz. The original frequency was FM 93.6 MHz.

About 95% of the content on IKIMfm was presented in Malay, although they also produced content in English and Arabic. Official estimates by The Nielsen Company (Malaysia) (an international survey company on radios in Malaysia) as reported in their latest Wave 2 study (2010) show that around 786,000 listeners in Peninsular Malaysia follow this Islamic radio station.

In June 2016, Radio IKIM upgraded the transmission frequency of Kedah and Perlis FM 89.0 MHz by moving the transmitter to Upper Gunung Jerai, to cover Kedah, Perlis, Penang and north Perak which allows Penang and north Perak to receive Radio IKIM broadcasts at 89.0 MHz clearly. Previously, FM 89.0 MHz could not be received in Penang and North Perak, but FM 89.0 MHz was interrupted by a radio station from Thailand (Yala) in Penang.

== Frequency ==
Frequency	Location	Transmitter sites	Note
91.5 MHz	Klang Valley	Gunung Ulu Kali	Frequency was formerly carried by RfM
89.0 MHz	Perlis, Alor Setar, Kedah dan Pulau Pinang	Gunung Jerai	
89.0 MHz	Taiping, Perak	Gunung Jerai	
102.7 MHz	Ipoh, Perak	Gunung Kledang	
102.7 MHz	Seremban, Negeri Sembilan	Gunung Telapak Buruk	
102.7 MHz	Balik Pulau, Pulau Pinang	Bukit Genting	
89.5 MHz	Melaka	Gunung Ledang	
106.2 MHz	Johor Bahru, Johor dan Singapura	Gunung Pulai	Former frequency: 107.9 MHz
89.6 MHz	Kuantan, Pahang	Bukit Pelindung	
100.2 MHz	Kuala Terengganu, Terengganu	Bukit Besar	
89.8 MHz	Kota Bharu, Kelantan	Bukit Panau	Former frequency was 89.9 MHz due to interference with Kelantan FM 90.0 Bukit Tangki Air transmitter
93.7 MHz	Kuching, Sarawak	Bukit Djin	Former frequency was on 93.6 MHz
93.9 MHz	Kota Kinabalu, Sabah	Bukit Karatong	
104.0 MHz	Miri, Sarawak	Tanjung Lobang	
100.7 MHz	Tawau, Sabah	Gunung Andrassy	
107.3 MHz	Lahad Datu, Sabah	Gunung Silam	
107.3 MHz	Sandakan, Sabah	Gunung Silam	

== See also ==
- List of radio stations in Malaysia
