= Mohammad Agus Yusoff =

Malaysian academic and lecturer

Yang Hormat Prof. Dato' Mohammad Agus Yusoff DIMP

Director General of the Community Communications Department
- In office 2 February 2023 – 16 November 2023
- Minister: Fahmi Fadzil
- Preceded by: Zuraidi Ishak
- Succeeded by: Mohd Khairuddin Othman

School of History, Politics, and Strategy, Faculty of Humanities and Social Sciences, National University of Malaysia
- In office 10 September 1985 – 11 July 2022

Personal details
- Born: 11 July 1962 (age 64) Kelantan
- Education: Universiti Malaya (BA); University of Manchester (MA & PhD)
- Occupation: Lecturer
- Profession: Academic

Mohammad Agus bin Yusoff (born 11 July 1962) is a Malaysian academic and lecturer who served as Director General of the Community Communications Department (J-KOM) from February to his resignation in November 2023. He served as a political science lecturer at Universiti Kebangsaan Malaysia from 10 September 1985 until his retirement on 11 July 2022. After retirement, he worked at Gorontalo State University, South Sulawesi, Indonesia as a professor of politics for six months, before being appointed to J-KOM.

== Honours ==
- Kelantan :
  - Knight Commander of the Order of the Loyalty to the Crown of Kelantan (DPSK) – Dato' (12 November 2011, revoked on 2 December 2023)
- Pahang :
  - Knight Companion of the Order of the Crown of Pahang (DIMP) – Dato' (2012)
