= Murat Öztürk (aviator) =

Turkish aerobatics pilot and camera operator (1953-2013)

- Born: 1953; Konya, Turkey
- Died: 2013 (aged 59–60); Adana, Turkey
- Cause of death: Aviation accident

Murat Öztürk (1953 in Konya – 19 May 2013 in Adana) was a Turkish professional aerobatics pilot and former camera operator.

== Early life ==
Murat Öztürk was born 1953 in Konya. He worked as a news camera operator at the state-run television channel of Turkish Radio and Television Corporation (TRT). On September 19th, 1976, Murat's father was on board Turkish Airlines Flight 452 when it crashed into a Mountain killing him and everyone else on board. Murat's professional life changed in 1985 when he was sent to Samandıra Airfield, Istanbul for a news footage on ultralight aviation. Afterwards, he took to flying ultralight aircraft, and acquired both pilot and instructor licenses.

== Aviator ==
With a friend, Öztürk purchased an agricultural plot on the bank of Lake Büyükçekmece to convert it into an earthen sports airfield for his flight exercises. He soon left his post as a cameraman, and, with the financial support of a businessman, built an asphalt-covered airfield with hangars that became known as Istanbul Hezarfen Airfield, serving general aviation.

He co-founded the aviation company "Top Air", one of Turkey's first private flight training schools, which educated hundreds of professional and amateur pilots. He later completely took over Top Air. His daughter Pelin Öztürk acquired her pilot's license in 2011, and is working as a pilot-instructor in her father's flight school.

Combining his photography experience with flying, Murat Öztürk became Turkey's first ever aerial photographer, and was awarded for his aerial imagery.

== Aerobatic pilot ==
In 2010, he became interested in aerobatics. In 2012, Öztürk crashed with his Pitts Special aerobatic biplane at Hezarfen Airfield. After recovering from his injuries, he returned to flying.

Since February 2013, Öztürk used to display aerobatics with his two-seat Pitts Special S-2B, registration TC-AYT, which he had purchased shortly before. After signing a sponsorship deal with an energy drink company in 2013, he performed his first aerobatic show above Maiden's Tower at Bosphorus on 28 April 2013. He then took part at an air show of the Turkish Stars and Solo Türk held on 12 May 2013 at Hezarfen Airfield.

To join an air show at the 2nd International Air Games Festival (Turkish: Uluslararası Hava Oyunları Festivali) in Adana, he took off from Istanbul Hezarfen Airfield on 15 May 2013. After a refueling stop at Eskişehir İnönü Airfield he flew to Ankara, where he visited the Directorate General of Civil Aviation. Öztürk arrived in Adana on 16 May, flying via Cappadocia in Nevşehir Province. In Adana, he performed a number of aerobatic shows over the city on 18 and 19 May in conjunction with the celebrations of the Commemoration of Atatürk, Youth and Sports Day.

== Death ==
Öztürk died on 19 May 2013, when his plane crashed into the ground and caught fire while performing a diving manoeuvre during the air show in Adana. His body was taken to Istanbul, where he was buried at the Eyüp Cemetery. He is survived by his wife Nilgün and daughter Pelin.
