= Paya Jaras (state constituency) =

State constituency in Selangor, Malaysia

Paya Jaras (N38)
Selangor constituency

State constituency
- Legislature: Selangor State Legislative Assembly
MLA
Ab Halim Tamuri
PN
- Constituency created: 1984
- First contested: 1986
- Last contested: 2023

Demographics
- Electors (2023): 72,563

Paya Jaras is a state constituency in Selangor, Malaysia, that has been represented in the Selangor State Legislative Assembly since 1986. It has been represented by Ab Halim Tamuri of Perikatan Nasional (PN) since 2023.

The state constituency was created in the 1984 redistribution and is mandated to return a single member to the Selangor State Legislative Assembly under the first past the post voting system.

== Demographics ==
Ethnic breakdown of Paya Jaras's electorate as of 2023
1. Malay (66.2%)
2. Chinese (15.5%)
3. Other ethnicities (9.13%)
4. Indian (9.10%)

== History ==
=== Polling districts ===
According to the gazette issued on 30 March 2018, the Paya Jaras constituency has a total of 11 polling districts.

State constituency	Polling districts	Code	Location
Paya Jaras（N38）	Petempatan Sungai Buloh	107/38/01	SK Sungai Buloh
Paya Jaras（N38）	Bandar Baru Sungai Buloh Utara	107/38/02	KAFA Integrasi Al-Ikhwan Bandar Baru Sungai Buloh
Paya Jaras（N38）	Bukit Rahman Putra	107/38/03	SK Bukit Rahman Putra
Paya Jaras（N38）	Merbau Sempak	107/38/04	SK Merbau Sempak
Paya Jaras（N38）	Paya Jaras	107/38/05	SRA Paya Jaras
Paya Jaras（N38）	Bandar Baru Sungai Buloh Selatan	107/38/06	SK Bandar Baru Sungai Buloh
Paya Jaras（N38）	Sungai Pelong	107/38/07	SK Seri Bertam
Paya Jaras（N38）	Paya Jaras Hilir	107/38/08	Pusat Pendidikan Awal Kanak-Kanak Kemas Kampung Paya Jaras Hilir
Paya Jaras（N38）	Matang Pagar	107/38/09	Dewan Serbaguna Matang Pagar
Paya Jaras（N38）	Kubu Gajah	107/38/10	Kelas Al Quran dan Fardhu Ain Jamiul Ehsan Kampung Kubu Gajah
Paya Jaras（N38）	Taman Saujana Utama	107/38/11	SMK Saujana Utama

=== Representation history ===
Members of the Legislative Assembly for Paya Jaras
Assembly	No	Years	Member	Party
Constituency created from Gombak and Bukit Raja
7th	N18	1986–1990	Saidin Tamby	BN (UMNO)
8th	N18	1990–1995	Saidin Tamby	BN (UMNO)
9th	N15	1995–1999	Saidin Tamby	BN (UMNO)
10th	N15	1999–2004	Sulaiman Samat	BN (UMNO)
11th	N38	2004–2008	Muhammad Bushro Mat Johor	BN (UMNO)
12th	N38	2008–2013	Muhammad Bushro Mat Johor	BN (UMNO)
13th	N38	2013–2015	Mohd Khairuddin Othman	PR (PAS)
13th	N38	2015–2018	Mohd Khairuddin Othman	PH (PKR)
14th	N38	2018–2023	Mohd Khairuddin Othman	PH (PKR)
15th	N38	2023–present	Ab Halim Tamuri	PN (PAS)

== Election results ==
Selangor state election, 2023
Party	Candidate	Votes	%	∆%
PN	Ab Halim Tamuri	27,627	51.72	▲51.72
PH	Mohd Khairuddin Othman	25,541	47.82	▼10.86
Independent	Nurhaslinda Basri	245	0.46	▲0.46
Total valid votes		53,413	100.00	
Total rejected ballots		246		
Unreturned ballots		66		
Turnout		53,725	74.04	▼13.16
Registered electors		72,563		
Majority		1,986	3.90	▼30.87
PN gain from PKR		Swing		?

Selangor state election, 2018
Party	Candidate	Votes	%	∆%
PKR	Mohd Khairuddin Othman	20,376	58.68	▲58.68
BN	Zein Isma Ismail	8,304	23.92	▼18.83
PAS	Hanafi Zulkapli	6,042	17.40	▼39.85
Total valid votes		34,722	100.00	
Total rejected ballots		307		
Unreturned ballots		86		
Turnout		35,115	87.20	▼1.52
Registered electors		40,269		
Majority		12,072	34.77	▲20.27
PKR gain from PAS		Swing		?

Selangor state election, 2013
Party	Candidate	Votes	%	∆%
PAS	Mohd Khairuddin Othman	21,808	57.25	▲8.68
BN	Muhammad Bushro Mat Johor	16,286	42.75	▼8.68
Total valid votes		38,094	100.00	
Total rejected ballots		477		
Unreturned ballots		128		
Turnout		38,699	88.72	▲10.25
Registered electors		43,617		
Majority		5,522	14.50	▲11.64
PAS gain from BN		Swing		?
Source(s) "Federal Government Gazette - Notice of Contested Election, State Legislative Assembly for the State of Selangor [P.U. (B) 192/2013]" (PDF). Attorney General's Chambers of Malaysia. 26 April 2013. Archived from the original (PDF) on 29 December 2019. "Federal Government Gazette - Results of Contested Election and Statements of the Poll after the Official Addition of Votes, State Constituencies for the State of Selangor [P.U. (B) 233/2013]" (PDF). Attorney General's Chambers of Malaysia. 22 May 2013. Archived from the original (PDF) on October 2, 2018.

Selangor state election, 2008
Party	Candidate	Votes	%	∆%
BN	Muhammad Bushro Mat Johor	11,521	51.43	▼9.20
PAS	Mohd Khairuddin Othman	10,879	48.57	▲9.20
Total valid votes		22,400	100.00	
Total rejected ballots		429		
Unreturned ballots		54		
Turnout		22,883	78.47	▲3.92
Registered electors		29,163		
Majority		642	2.86	▼19.00
BN hold		Swing		

Selangor state election, 2004
Party	Candidate	Votes	%	∆%
BN	Muhammad Bushro Mat Johor	10,966	60.63	▲2.86
PKR	Badrulamin Bahron	7,122	39.37	▲39.37
Total valid votes		18,088	100.00	
Total rejected ballots		241		
Unreturned ballots		23		
Turnout		18,352	74.55	▼0.39
Registered electors		24,616		
Majority		3,844	21.26	▲5.72
BN hold		Swing		

Selangor state election, 1999
Party	Candidate	Votes	%	∆%
BN	Sulaiman Samat	11,626	57.77	▼31.33
PAS	Abdul Majid Hasan	8,499	42.23	▲42.23
Total valid votes		20,125	100.00	
Total rejected ballots		610		
Unreturned ballots		504		
Turnout		21,239	74.94	▲3.29
Registered electors		28,340		
Majority		3,127	15.54	▼62.66
BN hold		Swing		

Selangor state election, 1995
Party	Candidate	Votes	%	∆%
BN	Saidin Tamby	15,636	89.10	▲19.85
S46	Khalid Siri	1,913	10.90	▼19.85
Total valid votes		17,549	100.00	
Total rejected ballots		745		
Unreturned ballots		277		
Turnout		18,571	71.65	▼1.60
Registered electors		25,918		
Majority		13,723	78.20	▲39.70
BN hold		Swing		

Selangor state election, 1990
Party	Candidate	Votes	%	∆%
BN	Saidin Tamby	22,642	69.25	▲7.71
S46	Ali Amran Ab. Hamid	10,055	30.75	▲30.75
Total valid votes		32,697	100.00	
Total rejected ballots		1,133		
Unreturned ballots		0		
Turnout		33,830	73.25	▲5.79
Registered electors		46,186		
Majority		12,587	38.50	▲6.89
BN hold		Swing		

Selangor state election, 1986
Party	Candidate	Votes	%
BN	Saidin Tamby	13,992	61.54
DAP	Hong Chin Poh	6,805	29.93
PAS	Syed Meer Wahid Syed Ibrahim	1,938	8.52
Total valid votes		22,735	100.00
Total rejected ballots		601	
Unreturned ballots		0	
Turnout		23,336	67.46
Registered electors		34,594	
Majority		7,187	31.61
This was a new constituency created.
