= Zaleha Kamarudin =

Malaysian academic

Yang Arif Dato' Sri Zaleha Kamarudin SSAP DPMS DIMP

Judge of Sharia Court of Appeal of Terengganu
- Incumbent
- Assumed office 16 October 2017
- Appointed by: Mizan Zainal Abidin

5th Rector of the International Islamic University Malaysia
- In office 2 August 2011 – 31 July 2018
- Chancellor: Ahmad Shah
- Preceded by: Syed Arabi Idid
- Succeeded by: Dzulkifli Abdul Razak

Personal details
- Born: 26 November 1961 (age 64) Raub, Pahang, Federation of Malaya
- Education: University of Malaya; International Islamic University Malaysia; University of London
- Occupation: Professor of law

Zaleha binti Kamarudin (born on 26 November 1961 at Raub, Pahang, Malaysia) is a Malaysian professor of law. She is Judge of Sharia Court of Appeal of Terengganu since 16 October 2017 and was the Rector of IIUM from 2 August 2011 to 31 July 2018.

== Academic background ==
Zaleha was educated at the University of Malaya and obtained a Bachelor of Laws degree (with Honours) in 1985. She furthered her study at IIUM as the first batch of students for Master in Comparative Laws and graduated in 1988. Subsequently, she continued her studies at the same university and graduated in 1989 with an Advanced Diploma in Shariah Law and Practice. In 1990, she proceeded to do her doctorate in Comparative Laws at University of London and graduated in 1994.

== Career ==
Zaleha chambered once she graduated from UM and was called to the Malaysian Bar in 1986. She joined IIUM as an assistant lecturer at Faculty of Laws at the preceding year. She was made a full lecturer at the same in 1988. She was promoted as an associate professor in 2000, and as a full professor in 2006.

She was seconded to Malaysian Institute of Islamic Understanding, where she became the Deputy Director-General from July 2009 to August 2011. Prior to secondment, she was the Dean of Centre for Postgraduate Studies (from 2002 to 2005) and of Faculty of Laws (from 2006 to 2009).

She was made the fifth Rector of IIUM on 2 August 2011 replacing Professor Dato' Sri Dr. Syed Arabi Syed Abdullah Idid. Her term of office expired on 31 July 2018 after having her terms extended. She was replaced by Professor Tan Sri Dzulkifli Abdul Razak on the following day.

She was also appointed as a Judge of Sharia Court of Appeal of Terengganu on 16 October 2017 and will serve the office for a term of three years.

== Honours ==
- Pahang :
  - Knight Companion of the Order of the Crown of Pahang (DIMP) – Dato' (2007)
  - Grand Knight of the Order of Sultan Ahmad Shah of Pahang (SSAP) – Dato' Sri (2011)
- Selangor :
  - Knight Commander of the Order of the Crown of Selangor (DPMS) – Dato' (2007)
