= Turkish Airlines Flight 452 =

1976 aviation accident

- The largest intact part of the aircraft following the crash

Accident
- Date: 19 September 1976
- Summary: Controlled flight into terrain due to pilot error
- Site: Karatepe, Isparta, Turkey; 37°43′50.4″N 30°33′15.8″E

Aircraft
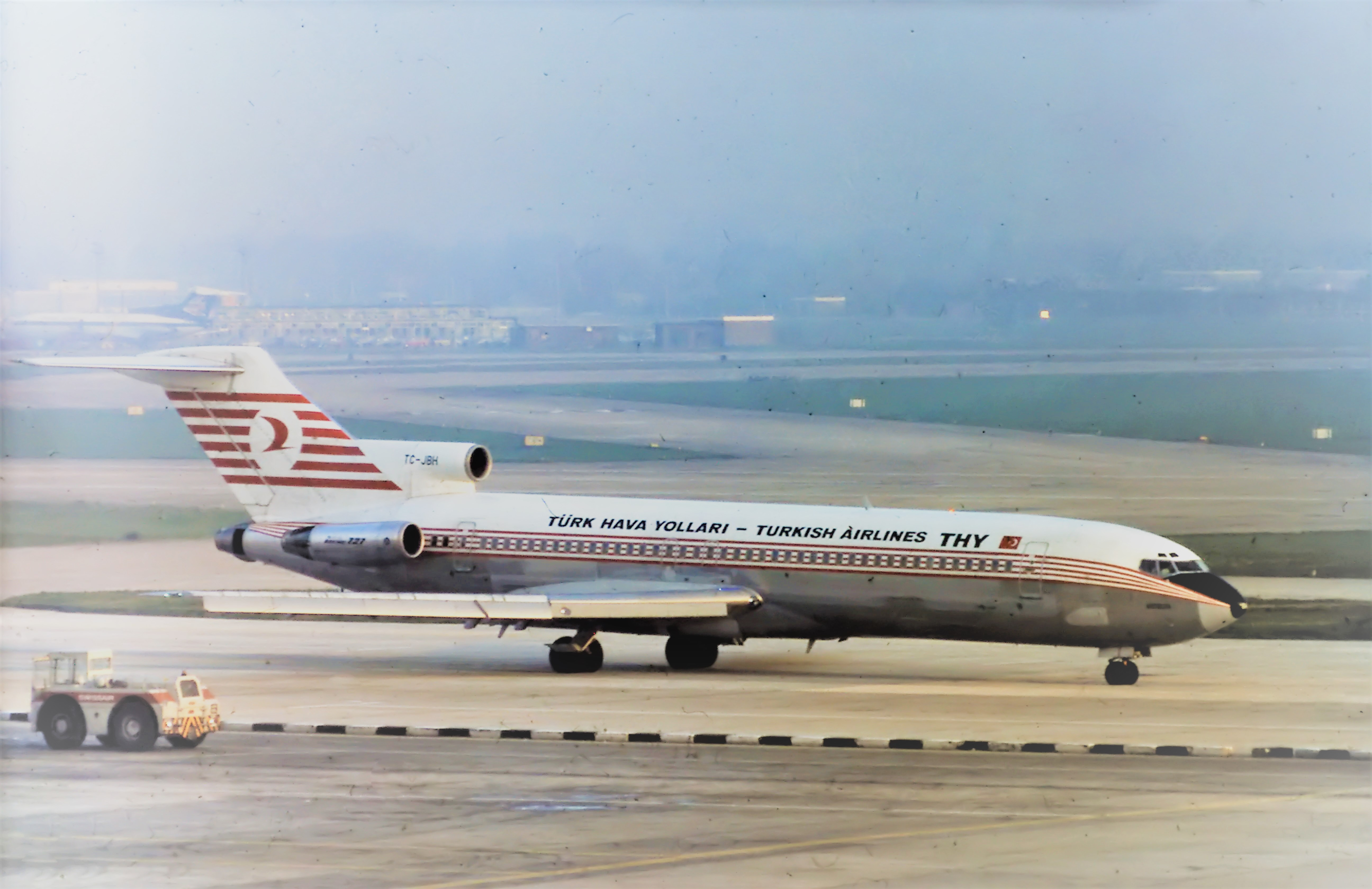
- TC-JBH, the aircraft involved in the accident, seen in 1975.
- Aircraft type: Boeing 727-200
- Aircraft name: Antalya
- Operator: Turkish Airlines
- IATA flight No.: TK452
- ICAO flight No.: THY452
- Call sign: TURKISH 452
- Registration: TC-JBH
- Flight origin: Milan, Italy
- Stopover: Atatürk Airport, Istanbul, Turkey
- Destination: Antalya Airport, Antalya, Turkey
- Occupants: 154
- Passengers: 146
- Crew: 8
- Fatalities: 154
- Survivors: 0

Turkish Airlines Flight 452 was a scheduled domestic passenger flight operated by a Boeing 727-2F2 of Turkish Airlines that crashed near Isparta on 19 September 1976 while en route from Milan, Italy, to Antalya Airport, via Atatürk Airport, Istanbul, Turkey, killing all 154 occupants on board. The crash is the deadliest aviation accident in Turkey's history.

The aircraft arrived in Istanbul from Milan, Italy, and took off again at 22:45 local time. The pilots started descending towards Antalya at 23:11 with the captain in the passenger cabin. The plane crashed at around 23:20 into the Karatepe Hill near Isparta, about 100 kilometres (62 mi; 54 nmi) from the destination, after the first officer mistook the city lights of Isparta for the runway of Antalya Airport, despite warnings from the controller at Antalya.

Most passengers were heading to Antalya for vacation and were not Turkish. The bodies of 18 Italian victims were buried at a cemetery near Isparta instead of being sent to Italy. A member of the Grand National Assembly of Turkey also died in the crash.

== Background ==
=== Aircraft ===
The aircraft involved, manufactured by Boeing in 1974, was a Boeing 727-2F2 (Note: "F2" is the Boeing customer code of Turkish Airlines.) registered as TC-JBH. The aircraft first flew on 11 November 1974. The plane was delivered to the airline on 1 December. TC-JBH was named Antalya, coincidentally the destination of the flight.

=== Crew ===
The flight crew consisted of Captain Celâl Topçuoğlu, First Officer Sacit Soğangöz, Flight Engineer Ahmet Bursalı, and technician Muhittin Güçlü. The four cabin crew members were Feyzan Güngör, Neriman Düzelli, Kâmuran Küçükkoşum and Canan Dinç. Three Turkish Airlines employees, scheduled to fly a McDonnell Douglas DC-9 from Antalya to Istanbul the next morning, were also deadheading on the flight.

== Accident ==
Location of the accident with the departure (LTBA) and destination (LTAI) airports

The plane arrived at Istanbul Atatürk Airport (IST/LTBA) from Milan, Italy, at 21:30 local time with 68 passengers. There were 78 more passengers boarded at Istanbul and the plane took off towards Antalya Airport at 22:45 with a delay of 35 minutes. Most of the additional passengers came from another Istanbul–Antalya flight which was initially scheduled to depart at 21:45, but was merged with Flight 452 instead due to the many empty seats in the Boeing 727.

At 23:11, the pilots reported that they could see the lights of the city, while the plane was around 100 kilometres (62 mi) north of it. 30 minutes after takeoff, they announced they were approaching Antalya Airport and would descend from 4,400 metres (14,400 ft) to 4,000 metres (13,000 ft). When the pilots confirmed they had the runway in sight, the controller at Antalya notified them that he couldn't see them. First Officer Soğangöz responded: "Should I believe you, or my eyes?" Captain Topçuoğlu, who was in the passenger cabin, returned to the cockpit after realizing that something was wrong at an altitude of 150 metres (490 ft) and gave full throttle when he saw the hill ahead.

Eyewitnesses reported that the plane flew very close to the city and that they could "almost see the passengers". The aircraft passed the Sidre Tepe Hill near Isparta, after which it started to climb. At 23:20, a loud explosion was heard from Karatepe, the hill after Sidre Tepe. The aircraft crashed its right wing in a hill, following which it bounced off to the other side of the valley and disintegrated. The wreckage was at an approximate altitude of 1,130 metres (3,710 ft). At the time of the accident, a horror film was being aired on television, causing some locals to leave their homes after the explosion.

== Wreckage and recovery ==
External video
- Airliner Crashes in Turkey Short of its Destination; The scene of the accident two days after the crash

The impact shattered the aircraft wreckage over an area of 2 kilometres (1.2 mi). After hearing the explosion, nearby residents climbed to the top of the hill for two hours. Military personnel were dispatched to the area and were already on the scene. They found pieces of the aircraft on fire and extinguished them by throwing sand atop. One of the wings was found on top of the hill, while the engines were located at the bottom. A generator was used to light up the site at night. To prevent the looting of items, officials closed the area to civilians, despite which thousands of people went up the hill and were able to see the wreckage and bodies after midnight. The first flight recorder was found the day after the accident. The flight data recorder was found on 22 September. In 2009, some remains of the plane were still found at the crash site.

== Victims ==
A total of 154 people, 143 passengers and 11 Turkish Airlines employees, were killed in the accident. About 125 of those passengers were of non-Turkish descent, largely being Italian tourists. Among the victims was Kemal Ziya Öztürk, an independent member of the Grand National Assembly of Turkey from the Aydın district and the father of aviator Murat Öztürk. The crash also claimed the life of the former Italian soldier and recipient of the Gold Medal of Military Valour, Enrico Martini. İlhan Cavcav was on board the aircraft on the first leg and was also due to continue with the flight to Antalya but changed his mind and flew to Ankara instead.

According to eyewitnesses, the bodies of victims were badly burned, making identification impossible. While most bodies of Italian victims were sent to Italy, 18 of the Italian passengers were buried at a local cemetery, as were all unidentified bodies. As of July 2026, the crash is the deadliest aviation accident to occur in Turkey.

== Investigation ==
Initial eyewitnesses gave conflicting accounts of the accident; some claimed the aircraft exploded mid-air or that the aircraft was on-fire. The day following the crash, a lightning strike was eliminated as a cause for the accident, based on the weather reports. Investigators accessed the cockpit voice recorder on 22 September, the transcript of which was kept secret. Just 4 days after the accident, Minister of Transport Nahit Menteşe said that while no report was ready, initial findings suggested a pilot error caused the accident, as the aircraft had started its descent too early. The experts inspecting the recordings later announced that the pilots were trying to fly visually, instead of instrumental flight, which was required at night, and that they mistook the dark area ahead of them—the Western Taurus Mountains—for the Mediterranean Sea and the city lights of Isparta for those of Antalya. It was also revealed that the distance measuring equipment of Antalya Airport broke three days before the crash.
