= Ab Halim Tamuri =

Malaysian politician, academic and lecturer

Yang Berhormat Dato' Ab Halim Tamuri DSIS MLA
- عبد حليم تموري

16th State Commissioner of the Malaysian Islamic Party of Selangor
- Incumbent
- Assumed office 31 October 2023
- President: Abdul Hadi Awang
- Preceded by: Ahmad Yunus Hairi

Chairman of the Board of Directors of TV Alhijrah
- In office 1 July 2022 – 17 May 2023
- Preceded by: Hussamuddin Yaacub
- Succeeded by: Mohd Khair Ngadiron

Rector of the Selangor International Islamic University College
- In office 1 July 2013 – 30 June 2021
- Preceded by: Aziuddin Ahmad
- Succeeded by: Mohd Farid Ravi Abdullah

Member of the Selangor State Legislative Assembly for Paya Jaras
- Incumbent
- Assumed office 12 August 2023
- Preceded by: Mohd Khairuddin Othman (PH–PKR)
- Majority: 1,986 (2023)

Personal details
- Born: Ab Halim bin Tamuri; 9 October 1967 (age 58) Tanjung Karang, Selangor, Malaysia
- Citizenship: Malaysian
- Party: Malaysian Islamic Party (PAS)
- Other political affiliations: Perikatan Nasional (PN)
- Education: Tanjong Karang English National Type School (1974–1979); Sultan Hisamuddin High Religious School (1980–1983); Klang Islamic College (1984–1985); Tengku Ampuan Jemaah High School (1986); National University of Malaysia (Bachelor's degree in Islamic Studies (Syariah), 1987–1991 & Diploma in Education, 1993–1995); University of Birmingham (Master of Islamic Education, 1995–1997 & Doctor of Philosophy in Islamic Education, 2000)
- Occupation: Politician; lecturer
- Profession: Academic

Ab Halim bin Tamuri (born 9 October 1967) is a Malaysian politician, academic and lecturer who has served as Member of the Selangor State Legislative Assembly (MLA) for Paya Jaras since August 2023. He is a member of the Malaysian Islamic Party (PAS), a component party of the Perikatan Nasional (PN) coalition. He has also served as the 16th State Commissioner of PAS of Selangor since October 2023. He served as the chairman of the Board of Directors of TV Alhijrah (TVAH) from July 2022 to May 2023, Rector of the Selangor International Islamic University College (KUIS) from July 2013 to June 2021 and Member of the National Education Policy Review Committee (JKKDPN) from October 2018 to April 2019. In addition, he is Professor in the field of Islamic Education at the Center for the Study of Leadership and Education Policy, the National University of Malaysia (UKM), Advisor of the Selangor Islamic Education Development Center, President of the Malaysian Muslim Intellectual Association, Chairman of the Education and Human Development Committee of the Selangor Islamic Religious Council, Member of the Board of Directors of the Kuala Lumpur Baitul Mal Professional College (KPBKL) and the Institute of Islamic Studies and Dakwah Sabah (IPDAS) as well as Member of the Selangor State Fatwa Council and the National Islamic Education Coordinating Committee.

== Early life and education ==
Ab Halim was born in Tanjung Karang, Selangor, Malaysia on 9 October 1967. He had his primary education at the Tanjong Karang English National Type School from 1974 to 1979, secondary education at the Sultan Hisamuddin High Religious School, Klang from 1980 to 1983 and Klang Islamic College from 1984 to 1985. He furthered his Malaysian Higher School Certificate (STPM) and pre-university education at the Tengku Ampuan Jemaah High School, Shah Alam in 1986. At the higher education level, he obtained a Bachelor's Degree in Islamic Studies (Syariah) from 1987 to 1991, Diploma in Education from 1993 to 1995 at the UKM, a Master of Islamic Education (M.Litt.) from 1995 to 1997 and a Doctor of Philosophy (PhD) in Islamic Education in 2000 at the University of Birmingham, United Kingdom.

== Political career ==
In the 2023 Selangor state election, Ab Halim made his electoral debut after being nominated by PN to contest the Paya Jaras state seat. Ab Halim won the seat and was elected to the Selangor State Legislative Assembly as the Paya Jaras MLA for the first term after narrowly defeating Mohd Khairuddin Othman of Pakatan Harapan (PH) and independent candidate Nurhaslinda Basri by a majority of only 1,986 votes.

During the campaigning period, Ab Halim added that changes in the political landscape could not be bound by mere perception, but instead needed to be in line with the facts and to implement the needs and wishes of the people in accordance with the status quo. He said that with various social media platforms, voters especially young people, were more aware of political changes and they would demand changes as promised during the campaign. He urged politicians to be more mature and avoid building perceptions that would harm themselves when their statements were twisted by some parties. He stated that voters of the day were more intelligent in assessing whether the leader was capable of carrying out his responsibilities or just creating rhetoric to win the elections than in the past. He claimed that with the maturity and changes in the existing political landscape, it was not impossible for PN to bring changes to voters, especially in Paya Jaras with its previous record of achievements. Meanwhile, Ab Halim interpreted the seven-pillar manifesto of PN namely the 'Selangor Kita Bangkit' ('Selangor We Rise' in English) as comprehensive and inclusive of every levels of society, capable of leading Selangor towards better progress politically, economically and socially as well as ensuring the education as well as well-being of the B40 and M40 groups who were under economic pressure. In addition, Deputy Chairman of PN and President of PAS Abdul Hadi Awang described Ab Halim as a 'gift' to Paya Jaras. He supported the description by elaborating that Ab Halim had a record of outstanding achievements to be an elected representative and would be able to play a big role to help the Selangor state government if PN took over power and Selangor from PH. He called on Paya Jaras voters to accept the 'gift' and give support to Ab Halim for his victory in Paya Jaras.

== Election results ==
Selangor State Legislative Assembly
Year	Constituency	Candidate	Votes	Pct	Opponent(s)	Votes	Pct	Ballots cast	Majority	Turnout
2023	N38 Paya Jaras	Ab Halim Tamuri (PAS)	27,527	51.63%	Mohd Khairuddin Othman (PKR)	25,541	47.91%	53,313	1,986	73.47%
2023	N38 Paya Jaras	Ab Halim Tamuri (PAS)	27,527	51.63%	Nurhaslinda Basri (IND)	245	0.46%	53,313	1,986	73.47%

== Honours ==
- Selangor
  - Knight Companion of the Order of Sultan Sharafuddin Idris Shah (DSIS) – Dato' (2010)
