= Dzulkifli Abdul Razak =

Malaysian academic

Yang Berbahagia Tan Sri Dato' Dzulkifli Abdul Razak PSM DPMS DMPN DPMP FWAAS FASc
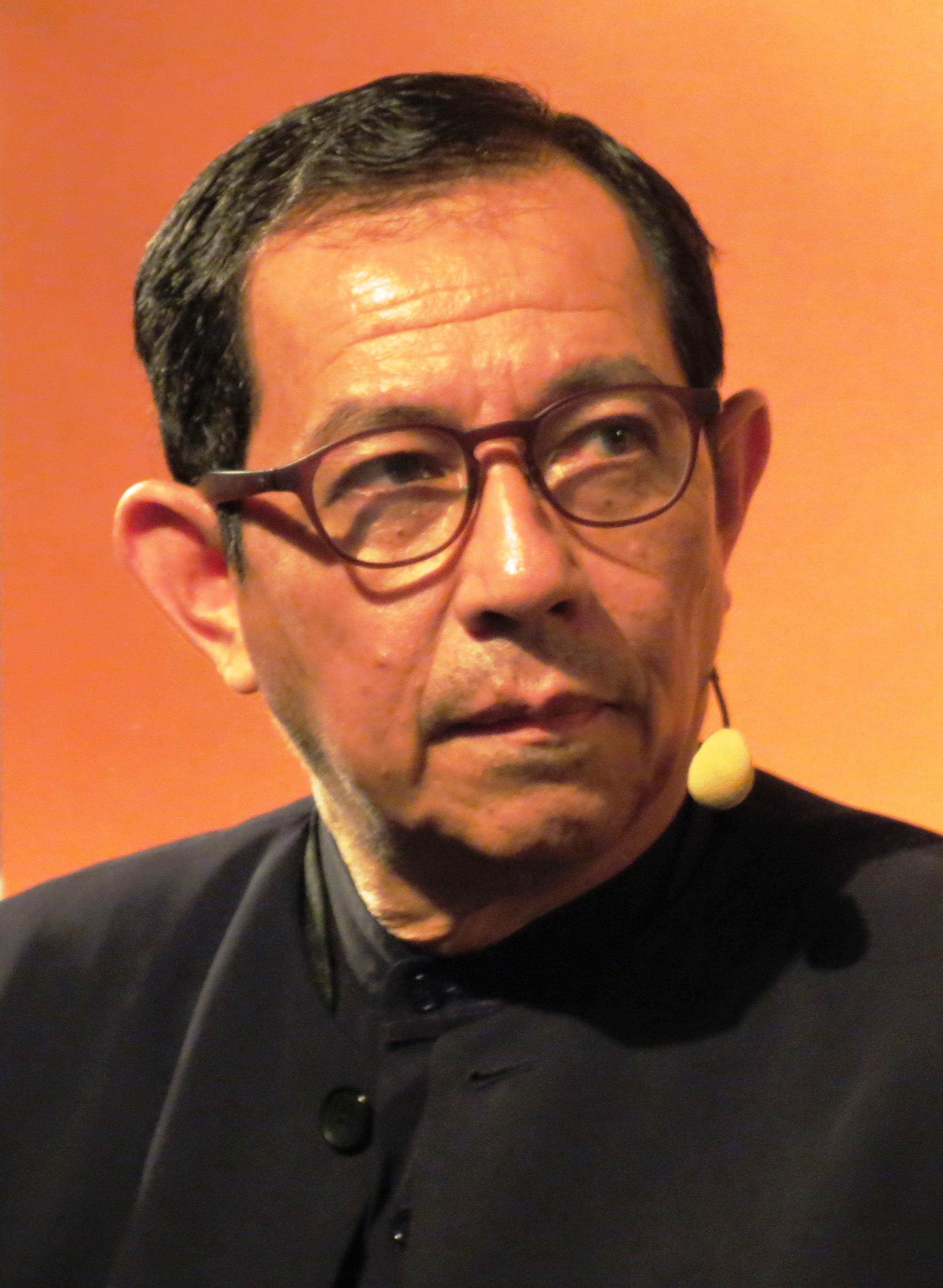

Rector of the International Islamic University Malaysia
- In office 1 August 2018 – 31 August 2024
- Constitutional Head: Sultan Ahmad Shah Al-Musta'in Billah; Tunku Azizah Aminah Maimunah Iskandariah
- Preceded by: Zaleha Kamaruddin
- Succeeded by: Osman Bakar

Chairman of Universiti Sains Islam Malaysia Board of Directors
- In office 1 April 2016 – 30 September 2018
- Chancellor: Tuanku Aishah Rohani
- Preceded by: Abdul Shukor Husin
- Succeeded by: Siddiq Fadzil

Personal details
- Born: 28 September 1951 (age 75) Selangor, Federation of Malaya (now Malaysia)
- Spouse: Masrah Abidin
- Children: 4
- Education: Universiti Sains Malaysia; University of Strathclyde
- Occupation: Education specialist

Dzulkifli bin Abdul Razak (born 1951) is a Malaysian emeritus professor, educationist and scientist who has served as the 6th Rector of the International Islamic University Malaysia (IIUM) from 1 August 2018 to 31 August 2024. He was the President of the International Association of Universities (IAU) from 2012 to 2016, and Chairman of Universiti Sains Islam Malaysia (USIM) Board of Directors from April 2016 to September 2018.

== Education ==
Dzulkifli undertook secondary education at the Malay College Kuala Kangsar (MCKK).

Dzulkifli obtained a degree of Bachelor of Pharmacy from Universiti Sains Malaysia (USM) and a degree of Master of Science in Pharmacology from University of Strathclyde.

He is a Senior Fellow of the Academy of Sciences Malaysia, the World Academy of Art and Science, the World Islamic Management Academy and the Malaysian Institute of Management. He is also Honorary Lifetime Member of Asian Academy of Management.

== Career ==
Dzulkifli started his career as an academician at USM, where he became its Vice Chancellor from 2000 to 2011. He then left USM to become the first Vice Chancellor of Albukhary International University before moving to Universiti Sains Islam Malaysia (USIM) to become the Distinguished Fellow at its Faculty of Leadership and Management and Inaugural Holder of the Islamic Leadership Chair between 2014-2016.

Prior to joining USIM, he served as a member of the World Health Organization (WHO) Expert Advisory Panel on Drug Policy and Management from 1995 to 2010, and the WHO Scientific Committee of Tobacco Product Regulation from 2004 to 2006.

He was also the 14th President of the International Association of Universities (IAU) from 2012 to 2016, the first for a Malaysian after 60 years. He is now the Honorary President of IAU based in Paris.

On 1 April 2016, Dzulkifli was appointed Chairman of Universiti Sains Islam Malaysia (USIM) Board of Directors expected for a three-year term but was cut-short for the next new appointment.

On 1 August 2018, Dzulkifli, who was a Distinguished Visiting Professor of IIUM between 2011 and 2013, succeeded Professor Dato' Sri Dr. Zaleha Kamaruddin as the 6th Rector of IIUM. He held the office for a three-year term until 31 July 2024.

Apart from being active in Education for Sustainable Development since the early 2000s, he is best noted as a foremost thinker on the concept of Sejahtera, the indigenous and traditional version the Sustainable Development in the Malay Archipielago

== Honours ==
Universitas 21 awarded the Gilbert Medal (the highest honour Universitas 21 can bestow) to Dzulkifli on 4 May 2017 in recognition of his contributions to education; he was the first Asian to receive this honour and the seventh globally. According to the award's website, he was selected in recognition of his long-term commitment to an integrated approach to internationalisation, to a sustainable (sejahtera) approach to international higher education, and for his work to support and develop the 'public good' of higher education. Additionally, his willingness to challenge Western knowledge systems and to support the development and dissemination of alternative views on science, philosophy and education has been distinctive.

He was also awarded several honorary doctorates for the same. Internationally, he was made an Honorary Doctor of Science by the University of Portsmouth, University of Nottingham and Mykolas Romeris University, in Lithuania; and an Honorary Doctor of Educational Science by Istanbul Commerce University. At the national level, he was conferred the Honorary Doctor of Dakwah and Islamic Management by USIM in 2019, and in 2021 by University of Cyberjaya, Honorary Doctor of Leadership in Education. Priority to this, his alma mater conferred him the title Professor Emeritus (the first for USM vice-chancellor) in 2018.

He also received the honour of being the 11th Tokoh Akademik Negara (National Academic Laureate) in 2017, and more recently he was awarded the Asia-Pacific Futures Network Award (APFN) at its 10th Annual Conference on September 4, 2023 for "his individual contributions in an institution enhancing futures thinking in the Asia-Pacific community."

In 2019, he was conferred The Order of The Rising Sun, Gold Rays with Neck Ribbon award by the Japanese Emperor for his outstanding contribution in promoting cultural exchange and mutual understanding between Malaysia and Japan. Most recently, he was the recipient of the 5th Dr Wu Lein-Teh Leadership Award for Public Health

=== Honours of Malaysia ===
- Malaysia :
  - Commander of the Order of Loyalty to the Cr own of Malaysia (PSM) – Tan Sri (2008)
- Selangor :
  - Knight Commander of the Order of the Crown of Selangor (DPMS) – Dato' (2001)
- Penang :
  - Companion of the Order of the Defender of State (DMPN) – Dato' (2003)
- Perlis :
  - Knight Commander of the Order of the Crown of Perlis (DPMP) – Dato' (2004)

== Family ==
Dzulkifi is the second child of Abdul Razak Abdul Hamid, the sole Malaysian survivor of Hiroshima bombing that took place in 1945.

He is married to Masrah Abidin and has four children.
