= Wadi Annuar =

Malaysian Islamic preacher (born 1983)

- محمد وادي انوار

Personal life
- Born: Mohammad Wadi Annuar bin Ayub; September 20, 1983 (age 43) Sungai Petani, Kedah, Malaysia
- Notable work: Andai Umat Ini Hidup Seperti Saidina Umar
- Occupation: Preacher, lecturer, writer, Islamic consultant

Religious life
- Religion: Islam
- Denomination: Sunni
- Creed: Ashari

Muslim leader
- Influenced by: Al-Ghazali, Ibn Kathir, and others.

Instagram information
- Page: Ustaz Wadi Annuar
- Followers: 1.2 Million (31 December 2024)

Mohammad Wadi Annuar bin Ayub (Jawi: محمد وادي انوار; better known as Ustaz Wadi Annuar is a Malaysian Islamic preacher and educator. Born on September 20, 1983, in Sungai Petani, Kedah, Malaysia, he is known for his sermons and dedication to Islamic education.

== Early life and education ==
Ustaz Wadi Annuar began his education at Sekolah Rendah Al-Islah and later attended Maktab Mahmud Alor Setar. He pursued higher studies at the Al Falah Islamic Institute in Damascus, Syria, where he specialized in Shariah and Arabic Language.

== Career ==
Ustaz Wadi is the founder of 'Akademi Darul Ilmi, and the CEO of Dakwah Global Sdn. Bhd.
