= Rozali Ismail =

Malaysian businessman

Yang Berbahagia Tan Sri Rozali Ismail
- Born: Selangor, Malaysia
- Occupations: Founder and Executive Chairman of Puncak Niaga Holdings; Executive Chairman of SYABAS
- Website: puncakniaga.com.my

Tan Sri Rozali Bin Ismail is a Malaysian businessman who is the founder and former executive chairman of Puncak Niaga Holdings Berhad. Ismail also served as the executive chairman of Syarikat Bekalan Air Selangor (SYABAS) and as the president of the Dewan Perniagaan Melayu Malaysia Selangor (DPMMS).

== Career ==
Ismail founded the company Puncak Niaga in 1997 and worked with politicians within Selangor to establish public-private partnerships in order to establish a three-state water treatment program in the region. Puncak Niaga was originally the parent company of SYABAS. In October 2015, both companies were taken over by the state government of Selangor. In 2018, Syarikat Pengeluar Air Sungai Selangor (SPLASH) filed a lawsuit against SYABAS, claiming around RM4.22 billion in debts owed. Tan Gim Tuan, chairman of the Malaysian Chinese Association (MCA), stated that SYABAS had been reporting substantial annual losses since the takeover. He raised concerns over how the lawsuit could lead to financial instability within the state.

He would go on to serve as the president of the Water Association of Selangor, Kuala Lumpur, and Putrajaya, and as the deputy president of the Malaysian Water Association. Ismail was also the treasurer of the United Malays National Organisation (UMNO) Selangor and the UMNO Hulu Selangor Division and represented the State of Selangor at the Malay Chamber of Commerce.

Rozali also serves as an advisor for the Sultan Idris Shah Polytechnic. He is the chairman of Gabungan Wawasan Generasi Felda (GWGF), a coalition of 14 non-governmental organizations that advocate for Felda settlers and their families. In 2017, Rozali was called upon to provide clarification regarding an RM 200 million land sale involving Felda property on Jalan Semarak. In 2018, he announced GWGF's continued support for the Barisan Nasional coalition and the United Malays National Organisation during Malaysia's 14th general election.

Rozali's salary as an executive chairman of SYABAS was reported to be RM33.4 million in 2012. He has been criticized for his possession of a high salary despite the poor performance of SYABAS as a service.

== Awards and recognition ==
=== Honors ===
- Commander of the Order of Loyalty to the Crown of Malaysia (PSM) (2000)
