= Shahrol Shiro =

Malaysian actor

- Born: Shahrol Azizie bin Azmi; 16 July 1984 (age 42); Kluang, Johor, Malaysia
- Education: Universiti Teknologi Malaysia
- Occupations: Comedian; Host Television; Singer; Radio presenter
- Years active: 2012–present
- Employers: Astro Radio (2016–2017); The Voice of Johor (2017); Star Media Radio Group (2017–2019)
- Political party: United Malays National Organisation (UMNO)
- Other political affiliations: Barisan Nasional (BN)
- Spouse: Nor Farhanah Syamimi (m. 2016)
- Children: 2
- Parents: Azmi (father); Normala binti Abdul Hamid (mother)
- Relatives: Ajak Shiro (cousin)

Shahrol Azizie bin Azmi (Jawi: شاهر العزيزي بن عزمي; born 16 July 1984) or better known as Shahrol Shiro is a comedian, actor, host and radio presenter from Malaysia.

== Personal life ==
Shahrol was married in 2008, but separated after three years of marriage. As a result of the marriage, they were blessed with a son, Muhd. Adam Danish. He then married Anna, whose real name is Nor Farhanah Syamimi, with a dowry of a copy of the holy Quran on March 17, 2016.

He is currently working as a practical instructor for a theatre and acting course under the Kursus Citra at Universiti Kebangsaan Malaysia (UKM) for the 2026/2027 academic session.

== Awards and nominations ==
- Champion - Raja Lawak Astro Season 6 (Shiro)
- 3rd Place - Maharaja Lawak Mega 2012 (Shiro)
- Runner-up - Maharaja Lawak Mega 2013 (Shiro)
- Runner-up - Super Spontan (2014)
- 4th Place - Maharaja Lawak Mega 2014 (Shiro)
- Runner-up - Maharaja Lawak Mega 2017 (Shiro)
- Finalist - Super Spontan Superstar 2017
- Finalist - Super Spontan Xtravaganza 2018
- Winner Maharaja Lawak Mega 2018 (Shiro)

List of awards and nominations received by Shahrol Shiro
Year	Award	Category	Result
2018	31st Daily News Popular Star Award	Popular Comedy Artist	Nominated

== Discography ==
=== Songs ===
Year	Song title	Guest singer
2013	Zapin K-Pop	Ajak Shiro
2015	Oh My Budget	Ajak Shiro, Altimet and Girls Republik

== Filmography ==
=== Film ===
Year	Title	Character	Notes
2012	Berani Punya Budak	Immigration Officer	First film, special appearance
2012	Sepah The Movie	Ali	
2013	Ustaz, Mu Tunggu Aku Datang	Dadu	
2014	Suatu Malam Kubur Berasap 2	Amir	
2025	Keluang Man	Ated	

=== Telefilm ===
Year	Title	Character	TV Channel
2013	Wartawan Kampung	Mus	Astro Warna
2013	Atan & Atoi	Atan	TV9
2013	Shiro Bermula Sebuah Cerita	Shahrol	Astro Warna
2013	Raya Rabak	Shahril 'Sha'	Astro Warna
2014	Mujibur Mari	Mujibur	Astro Warna

=== Drama ===
Year	Title	Character	TV Channel	Notes
2011	Pucuk Muda Kerabu Taugeh		Astro Prima	First drama
2011	Cinta Tampal	Tahir	Astro Warna	
2011	Super Lawak FC		Astro Warna	
2012	Ini Betul Baru Raya	Salam	Astro Warna	
2014	Kifarah (Season 1)	Azman	TV3	Episode: "Duit"
2015	Tanah Kubur (Season 14)	Himself	Astro Oasis	Episode: "Tanah Kubur"

=== Participants ===
Year	Title	Group
2012	Raja Lawak (Season 6)	Shiro
2012	Super Spontan 2012	Cute Bear
2012	Maharaja Lawak Mega 2012	Shiro
2013	Maharaja Lawak Mega 2013	Shiro
2014	Super Spontan 2014	Lazer Lizard
2014	Maharaja Lawak Mega 2014	Shiro
2015	Super Spontan All Stars	Kungfu Kipidap
2017	Maharaja Lawak Mega 2017	Shiro
2017	Super Spontan Superstar 2017	Tengiling Taiko
2018	Super Spontan Xtravaganza	Sotong Kangkung
2018	Maharaja Lawak Mega 2018	Shiro

=== Television ===
Year	Title	Role	TV Channel	Notes
2012	Betul Ke Bohong? (Season 1)	Guest artist	Astro Warna	Episode 6
2012	Betul Ke Bohong? (Season 2)	Guest artist	Astro Warna	Episode 5&10
2013	Redah Kasi Pecah Extravaganza	Alone	Astro Warna	
2013–2014	Betul Ke Bohong? (Season 4)	Group leader	Astro Warna	with Ajak Shiro
2013–2014	Betul Ke Bohong? (Season 5)	Group leader	Astro Warna	with Ajak Shiro
2014	Betul Ke Bohong? (Season 5 Special)	Group leader	Astro Warna	with Ajak Shiro
2014	Suka Lattew	Host with Alif Satar	Astro Ria	
2015	Special Edition 2015	Pian Kepoh	TV3	
2015	This Raya is Ours	Guest Artist	Astro Warna	
2015	MeleTOP Kebaboom	Co-host with Alif Satar	Astro Ria	
2018	Arena Panggang	Himself	Astro Warna	
2018	Arena Panggang Warna Live	YB Jemputan	Astro Warna	
2019	All Stars Buka Panggung	Host	Astro Warna	Co-host with Ajak Shiro

== Radiography ==
=== Radio ===
Year	Title	Station
2015–2016	#Sate	Era
2017	Skuad Pagi Best	Best FM
2017 – January 2019	Team Pagi Suria & Suria Top 40	Suria

== Siniar ==
Year	Title	Role	Channel	Note
2025	Temasya Komedi Rakyat	Host	YouTube	Co-host Ajak Shiro
