= Razali Nawawi =

Malaysian academic (1940–2023)

Professor Datuk Dr. Razali Nawawi

1st President of the Malaysian Islamic Youth Movement
- In office 1972–1974
- Preceded by: Office established
- Succeeded by: Anwar Ibrahim

Personal details
- Born: April 17, 1940 Kampung Hutan Pasir, Tendong, Pasir Mas, Kelantan, Federated Malay States
- Died: May 18, 2023 (aged 83) Bandar Baru Bangi, Selangor, Malaysia
- Cause of death: Prostate cancer
- Education: Al-Azhar University; Ain Shams University; University of Birmingham; International Islamic University Malaysia
- Occupation: Academic
- Known for: Foundational Dean of the Ahmad Ibrahim Kulliyyah of Laws; Inaugural President of ABIM

Razali Nawawi (17 April 1940 – 18 May 2023) was a Malaysian academic, jurist, and Islamic activist. He served as the foundational Dean of the Ahmad Ibrahim Kulliyyah of Laws at the International Islamic University Malaysia (IIUM) from 1983 to 1990. He was also the inaugural president of the Malaysian Islamic Youth Movement (ABIM), leading the organisation from 1972 until 1974, when he was succeeded by Anwar Ibrahim.

== Early life and education ==
Razali Nawawi was born on 17 April 1940 in Kampung Hutan Pasir, Tendong, Kelantan. He was raised in Kampung Slow Machang, Pasir Mas, and received his primary education at Sekolah Rakyat Kampung Selor Machang before transferring to Sekolah Melayu Pasir Mas. He attended secondary school at Sekolah Arab Pasir Mas followed by Ma'ahad Muhammadi in Kota Bharu. In early 1960, he enrolled in the Islamic College of Malaya in Klang, Selangor. Following the completion of his studies in late 1963, he worked as a teacher at Setapak High School in 1964.

On 11 November 1964, Razali began his undergraduate studies at Al-Azhar University in Egypt, graduating in 1966. He then completed a Diploma in Education at Ain Shams University in Cairo in 1967. On 11 November 1967, he pursued a postgraduate diploma in law at the London University in the United Kingdom. He subsequently completed a Master of Arts in Comparative Religion at the University of Birmingham in 1971. In 1992, he obtained his PhD from the International Islamic University Malaysia (IIUM).

== Academic career ==
Razali served as the Dean of the Faculty of Islamic Studies at the National University of Malaysia (UKM) from 1972 to 1976. He later became the foundational Dean of the Ahmad Ibrahim Kulliyyah of Laws at the International Islamic University Malaysia, serving in the role from 1983 to 1990.

In addition to his academic career, Razali was a prominent figure in Islamic civic organisations. He served as the inaugural president of the Malaysian Islamic Youth Movement (ABIM) from its establishment in 1972 until 1974, when he was succeeded by Anwar Ibrahim. During his presidency, Razali introduced and structured the practice of usrah (small-group study circles) as a core tenet for the movement. This system was subsequently adopted by several other Islamic organisations in Malaysia. Razali documented his experiences in activism in his memoir, Erti Perjuangan (The Meaning of Struggle), which was officially launched by Anwar Ibrahim on 13 September 2020 during the 14th National Assembly of the Movement for an Informed Society Malaysia (WADAH).

== Death ==
Razali Nawawi died at 6:45 am on 18 May 2023 at the An-Nur Specialist Hospital in Bandar Baru Bangi, Selangor, at the age of 83. His death was confirmed by the Malaysian Islamic Youth Movement (ABIM), the organisation he founded, which announced that he had succumbed to a long battle with prostate cancer.

A close friend of Prime Minister Anwar Ibrahim, Razali had been visited by the premier at his home days prior to his death. His funeral and Islamic rites were held at Masjid Al-Umm in Section 1, Bandar Baru Bangi, following the midday Zohor prayers.
