= Malaysian Islamic Youth Movement =

Islamic organisation in Malaysia

Angkatan Belia Islam Malaysia Muslim Youth Movement of Malaysia اڠکتن بليا اسلام مليسيا
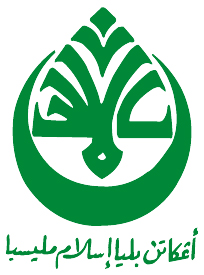
- Abbreviation: ABIM
- Formation: 6 August 1971
- Founder: Dato' Seri Anwar Ibrahim (PMX Malaysia)
- Type: Non-profit non-governmental organisation
- Location: Malaysia
- Key people: Ahmad Fahmi Mohd Samsudin (President)
- Website: www.abim.org.my

Angkatan Belia Islam Malaysia (ABIM) or the Muslim Youth Movement of Malaysia is an Islamic organisation in Malaysia founded on 6 August 1971 at Dewan Al-Malik Faisal in Petaling Jaya. It emerged from the student movement PKPIM and was initially led by Razali Nawawi, with Anwar Ibrahim as secretary-general and Siddiq Fadzil as a key intellectual figure.

ABIM played a major role in Malaysia's Islamic revival, advocating for Islamisation through education, economics, and governance. Its influence extended to the founding of institutions such as the International Islamic University Malaysia and Bank Islam Malaysia.

== History ==
=== Origins ===
ABIM was officially established on 6 August 1971 during the 10th general assembly of PKPIM at Dewan al-Malik Faisal in Petaling Jaya, Selangor. Razali Nawawi was appointed its first president, with Anwar Ibrahim as secretary-general and Siddiq Fadzil as a principal intellectual figure. Some sources have also associated Wahab Sulaiman with the organisation’s early development.

=== Islamic outreach and education ===
Founded during a period of global Islamic resurgence, ABIM promoted Islam through educational and charitable initiatives. Yayasan Anda, a private school established by ABIM, became known as "the Institute" and served as a platform for Islamic education reform and leadership training. The organisation attracted a new generation of Muslim students disillusioned with secular and Western cultural influences. It became a key actor in the nascent dawah movement in Malaysia, engaging urban youth and university students through lectures, reading circles, and publications.

ABIM was intellectually inspired by the ideas of figures such as Abul A'la Maududi, Hassan al-Banna, and Sayyid Qutb, reflecting its ideological proximity to the Muslim Brotherhood.

=== State engagement and institutional legacy ===
In the 1980s, ABIM adopted the concept of islah (reform) from within the state framework. Following Anwar Ibrahim's entry into UMNO in 1982, the organisation’s influence extended into public policy, particularly in the formation of institutions such as the International Islamic University Malaysia (IIUM) in 1982 and Bank Islam Malaysia in 1983. These initiatives originated in ABIM’s annual general assembly resolutions and reflected its goal of institutionalising Islamic values through higher education and Islamic finance.

Despite these partnerships, ABIM retained its independence and continued to critique government actions that it deemed inconsistent with Islamic governance and ethical standards. By the mid-1980s, it claimed a membership of 40,000 and later expanded to over 60,000 nationwide.

=== International ties and intellectual networks ===
Throughout the 1970s and 1980s, ABIM maintained transnational relationships with Islamic movements and intellectual networks. It built ties with organisations such as Muhammadiyah in Indonesia, Jamaat-e-Islami in South Asia, and the Muslim Brotherhood in the Middle East. ABIM also sent humanitarian aid to Afghan mujahideen during the Soviet–Afghan War and voiced solidarity with struggles in Palestine and Bosnia and Herzegovina.

ABIM further engaged with the International Institute of Islamic Thought (IIIT), whose intellectual agenda on Islamisation of knowledge—championed by Isma'il Raji al-Faruqi and Taha Jabir al-Alwani—influenced ABIM’s vision for higher education. These collaborations contributed to shaping the academic orientation of the International Islamic University Malaysia.

=== Role in Reformasi ===
During the Reformasi political crisis following the dismissal and arrest of Anwar Ibrahim in 1998, ABIM re-emerged as a vocal actor. The organisation strongly condemned the government’s crackdown and aligned itself with the Reformasi movement. Several ABIM leaders, including then-president Ahmad Azam Abdul Rahman, were detained under the Internal Security Act.

The period also witnessed the "ABIMisation" of Parti Keadilan Nasional (KeADILan), as many former members joined the new political party founded in response to Anwar's arrest. This development sparked debates over whether ABIM’s ideological purity was being compromised by political partisanship. Nonetheless, ABIM remained officially non-partisan and continued to promote Islamic values through civil society engagement.

== List of presidents of ABIM ==
- Razali Nawawi (1971–1974)
- Anwar Ibrahim (1974–1982)
- Siddiq Fadzil (1983–1991)
- Muhammad Nur Manuty (1991–1997)
- Ahmad Azam Ab Rahman (1997–2005)
- Yusri Mohamad (2005–2009)
- Muhamad Razak Idris (2009–2011)
- Amidi Abdul Manan (2011–2015)
- Mohamad Raimi Abdul Rahim (2015–2019)
- Muhammad Faisal Abdul Aziz (2019–2023)
- Ahmad Fahmi Mohd Samsudin (2024–present)

== See also ==
- Islam in Malaysia
