= Community Communications Department =

Malaysian government agency

- Jabatan Komunikasi Komuniti (J-KOM)

Agency overview
- Formed: March 2000 (dissolved on 15 October 2018, reestablished on 25 November 2020)
- Preceding agencies: 1959 – Badan Hal Ehwal Khas (BHEK); 1960 – Cawangan Hal Ehwal Khas (CHEK); 2000 – Jabatan Hal Ehwal Khas (JHEK)
- Type: Department; State-sponsored Internet propaganda
- Jurisdiction: Ministry of Communications of Malaysia
- Agency executive: Ismail Yusop, Director General
- Website: www.jasa.gov.my

Community Communications Department (Malay: Jabatan Komunikasi Komuniti, Abbr.: J-KOM) (previously called Special Affairs Department (Malay: Jabatan Hal Ehwal Khas, Abbr.: JASA) is a government agency of the Malaysian government, under the purview of the Ministry of Communications.

== Overview ==
The agency first began as the Badan Hal Ehwal Khas (BHEK) (Special Affairs Agency), a unit under the Ministry of Information established after the 1959 Malayan general election to "maintain and protect the political, religion and government stability". In 1960 BHEK was upgraded and renamed as the Cawangan Hal Ehwal Khas (CHEK) (Special Affairs Branch) under the purview of Jabatan Perkhidmatan Penerangan (Federal Government's Information Services). The government Cabinet meeting in March 2000 approved the formation of a new 'Department of Special Affairs' (Jabatan Hal Ehwal Khas, abbreviated JHEK) to be upgraded from CHEK.

In 2004, its acronym JHEK was changed to JASA. It was formed initially aimed to explain the government initiatives and programmes although critics argued that it was slowly deviated and turned into a political propaganda machinery for Barisan Nasional (BN) especially those of United Malays National Organisation (UMNO) to attack the opposition parties and political rivals.

The JASA's controversial functions were questioned and has been alleged as an inefficient government agency, amounting to more than a thousand employees and a huge expenditure of RM74 million. For example, its former Director General from 2015 to 2018, Puad Zarkashi, was paid RM 20,592.00 for his monthly salary, much more than an average minister salary of RM 14,907.20 a month.

=== Brief dissolution and re-establishment ===
After the 2018 general election that saw the downfall of Barisan Nasional (BN) government, prime minister Mahathir Mohamad of the new Pakatan Harapan (PH) coalition federal government announced that the JASA was among few government agencies and departments that to be abolished. Mahathir stated that JASA was dissolved because it was riddled with too many political elements; the agency has been attributed to engage in state-sponsored anonymous political commentators and trolls by spreading pro-government propaganda on the internet, colloquially known as "cybertroopers".

JASA was initially completely dissolved on 15 October 2018 with its 300 civil servants absorbed into other departments and ministries. However, after the Perikatan Nasional (PN) coalition took back control of the government during the 2020–2022 Malaysian political crisis, JASA was re-established in 2020, having been rebranded as the Community Communications Department (J-KOM). A government minister claimed that this time, J-KOM will not be used as a pro-government propaganda machine, without specifying further. BN/UMNO themselves eventually officially took back control as the government under the administration of Ismail Sabri Yaakob, including J-KOM.

== See also ==
- Astroturfing
- State-sponsored Internet propaganda

== See also ==
- National Civics Bureau
