= Eyüp Cemetery =

Cemetery in Istanbul

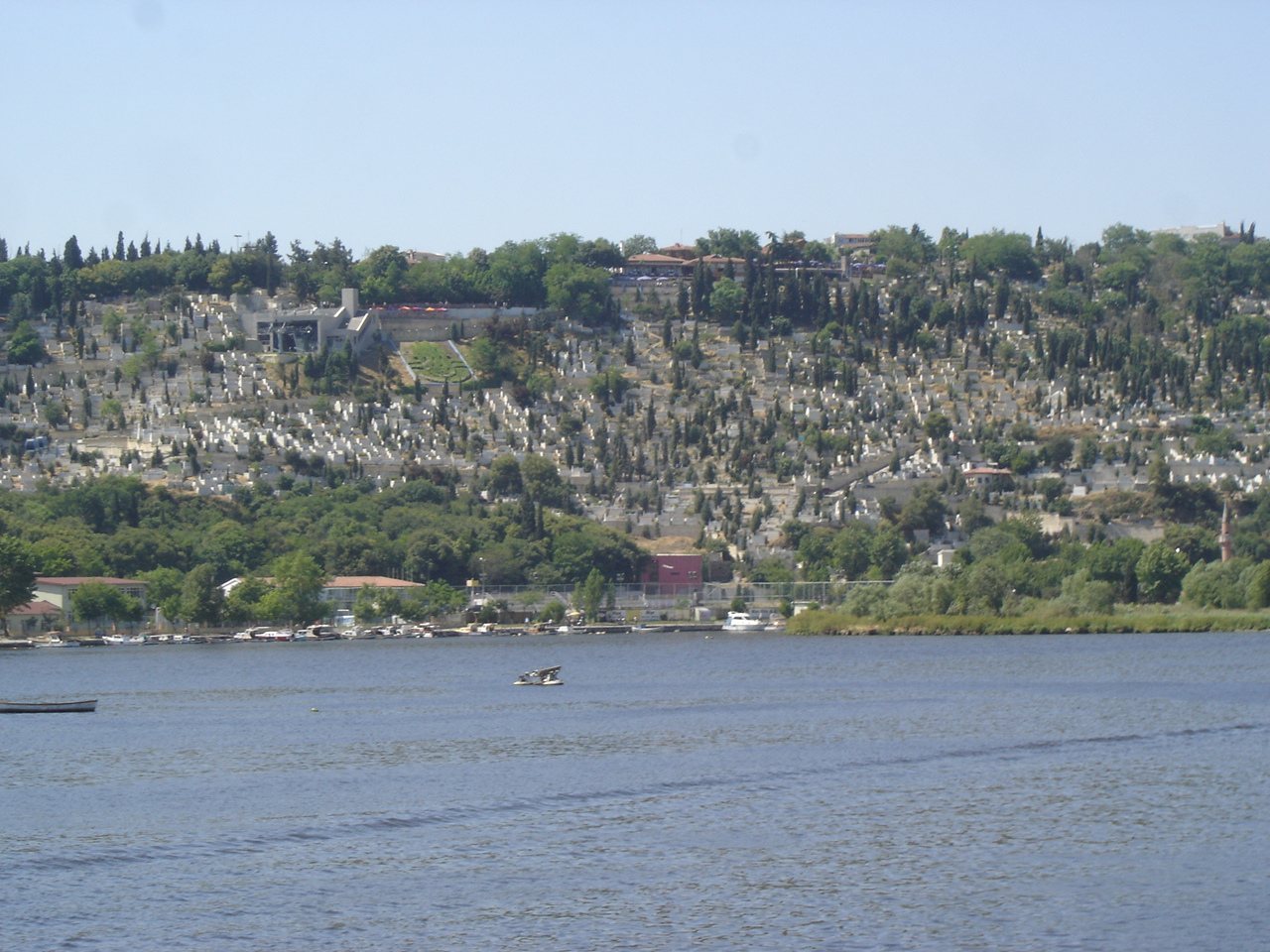
- Part of the Eyüp Cemetery seen from the eastern bank of the Golden Horn
- Interactive map of Eyüp Cemetery

Details
- Location: Eyüp, Istanbul
- Country: Turkey
- Coordinates: 41°03′10″N 28°56′04″E
- Type: Public
- Owned by: General Directorate of Foundations
- Website: İBB Mezarlıklar Md. website

The Eyüp Cemetery (Turkish: Eyüp Mezarlığı), aka Eyüp Sultan Cemetery, is a historic burial ground located in the Eyüp district, on the European side of Istanbul, Turkey. It is administered by the General Directorate of Foundations. One of the oldest and largest Muslim cemeteries in Istanbul, it hosts graves of Ottoman sultans and court members, grand viziers, high-ranking religious authorities, civil servants, military commanders as well as intellectuals, scientists, artists and poets.

== History ==
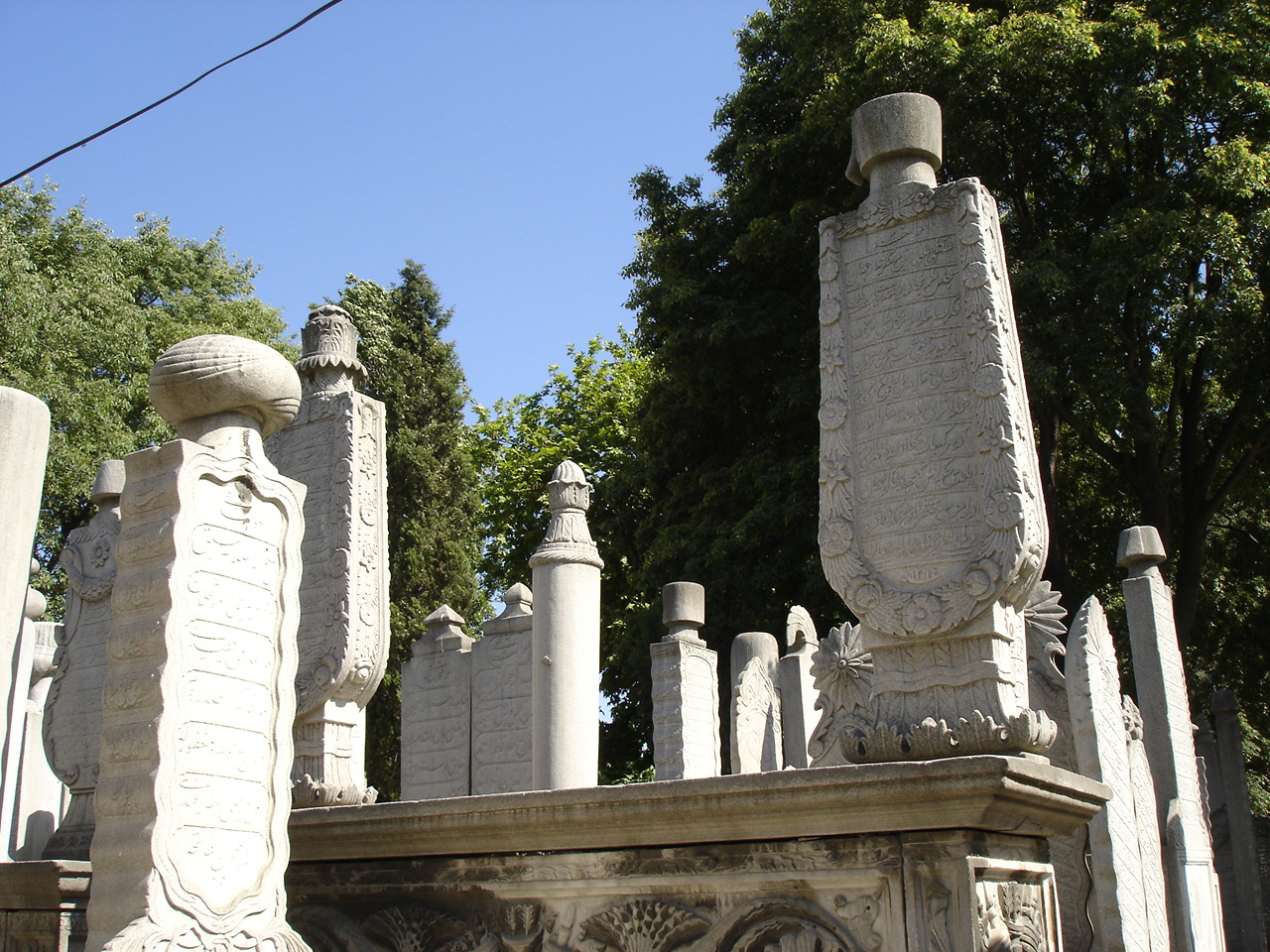
Ottoman-era headstones in the Eyüp Cemetery with head coverings denoting the deceased's profession or social status.

The cemetery was very popular with Ottoman people, as they wanted to be buried next to the tomb of Abu Ayyub al-Ansari (576–circa 672 or 674), in Ottoman Turkish Ebu Eyyûb el-Ensarî (in modern Turkish Eyüp Sultan, hence the name of the cemetery). A close companion (sahaba) of Islam's Prophet Muhammad, he died during the First Arab Siege of Constantinople against the Byzantine capital and wanted to be buried as close as possible to the city walls. After the Conquest of Constantinople by the Ottoman Turks in 1453, a tomb was constructed above his grave and a mosque, now called the Eyüp Sultan Mosque, built in his honor. From that time on, the area now known as Eyüp has become sacred, and many prominent Ottoman people requested burial in proximity of Abu Ayyub.

The Eyüp Cemetery is situated on the western bank of the Golden Horn just outside the historic Walls of Constantinople (today İstanbul). It stretches between the Golden Horn's shore up to Karyağdı Slope, and further to Edirnekapı. Road construction works and nationalization around Golden Horn did great damage to the graves.

Among the most interesting graves are of those of the Ottoman-era public executioners. They were not allowed to be buried in public cemeteries, and a separate burial ground, called the "Executioner Cemetery" (Turkish: Cellat Mezarlığı), existed on the Karyağdı Hill aside the Eyüp Cemetery. Their burial took place only in two cemeteries in Istanbul, and even so secretly in the night. The headstones were blank without any name and date in order to avoid retaliation by the relatives of the executed persons. Only a few executioners' graves have survived up to date.

== Crime site ==
In the evening hours of a November day in 1994, a 45-year-old Austrian woman professor was assaulted, murdered and robbed as she was descending the hill through the cemetery after a coffee break at the popular cafeteria (called Pierre Loti cafeteria) on the top of the hill. The murderer was a 17 years old car painter.

In the early hours of afternoon on August 25, 2001, prominent Turkish Jewish businessman and a cofounder of Alarko Holding, Üzeyir Garih was found dead by cemetery guards next to the grave of Fevzi Çakmak. He was stabbed ten times, of which seven were deadly. Police arrested a suspect after two hours, who confessed the crime adding he committed the murder for robbery. However, the actual murderer, who robbed Garih's money and stole his mobile phone, was caught ten days later. Reportedly, Garih used to visit the grave of Turkey's first Chief of the General Staff field marshal Çakmak every two weeks.

Shortly after the 2001 murder case, a commissioner at the prosecutor's office of Eyüp district admitted that the Eyüp Cemetery had become a place of prostitution and drug use by negligence. It was reported that since the murder in 1994 no monitoring by police patrol was taking place in the cemetery and at the trail to the cafeteria on the top of the hill, which are frequented by tourists.

== Notable burials ==
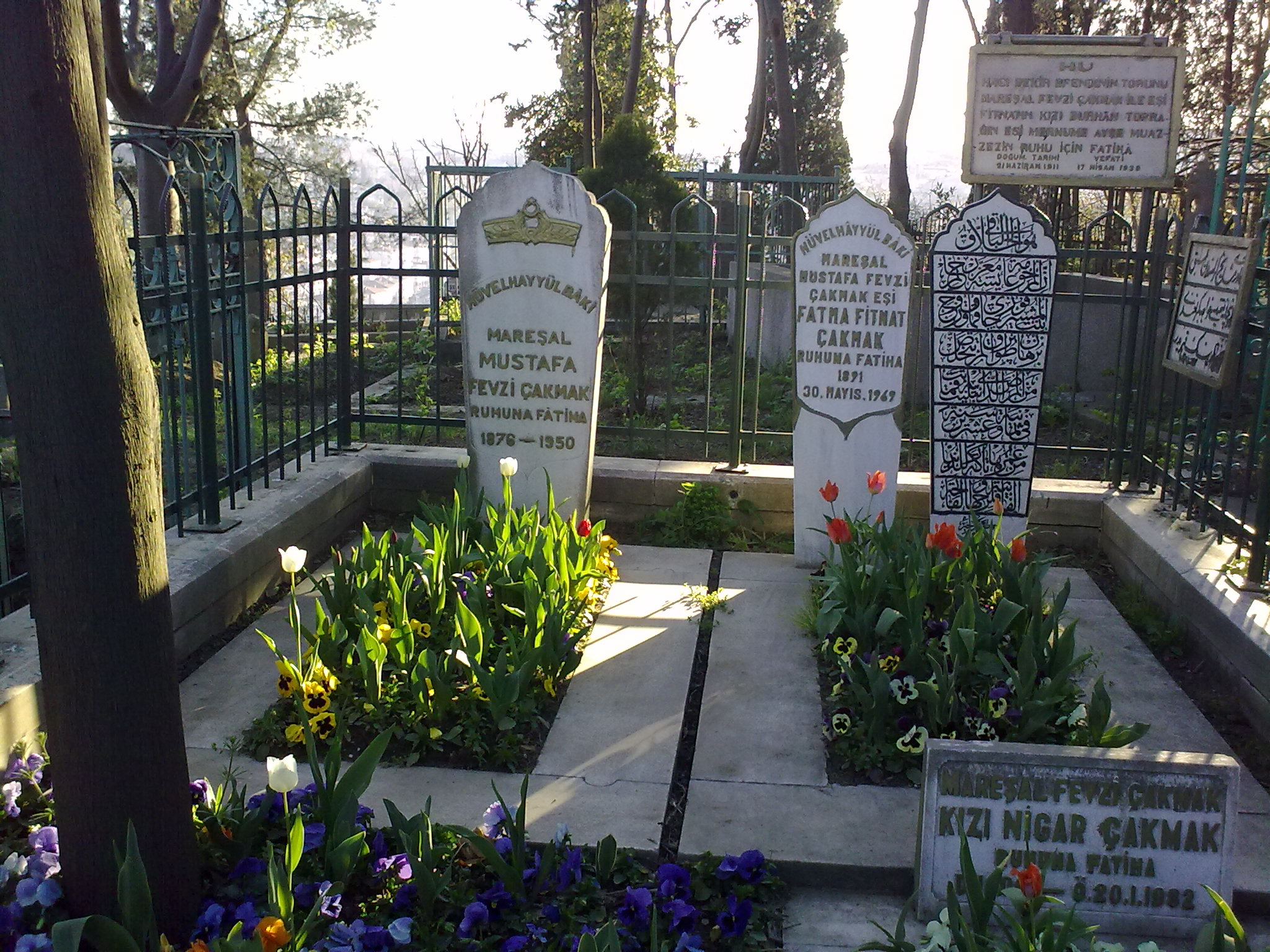
Field Marshal Fevzi Çakmak's family grave

- Khidr Bey (1407–1459), Hanafi-Maturidi scholar and poet
- Idris Bitlisi (1457 – 1520), Ottoman Kurdish figure
- Mehmed V (1844–1918), 35th sultan of the Ottoman Empire
- Prince Sabahaddin (1878–1948), sociologist and thinker
- Husein Gradaščević 1802–1834) Bosniak general who rebelled against the Ottoman Empire
- Haci Arif Bey (1831–1885), Ottoman classical music composer
- Ahmet Haşim (1884?–1933), poet
- Mehmed Said Pasha (1830–1914), statesman and editor of the newspaper Jerid-i-Havadis
- Şeker Ahmed Pasha (1841–1907), painter, soldier and government official
- Fevzi Çakmak, (1876–1950), field marshal and politician
- Sadettin Heper (1899–1980), Mevlevi music composer
- Hüseyin Hilmi Işık (1911–2001), Islamic scholar
- Necip Fazıl Kısakürek (1904–1983), poet, novelist, playwright, philosopher and activist
- Nurettin Uzunoğlu (1939–2013), Islamic scholar, professor, political scientist, and academic
- Enver Ören (1939–2013), businessman and founder of İhlas Holding
- Murat Öztürk (1953–2013), professional aerobatics pilot
- Ahmad Ammar Ahmad Azam (1993–2013), first Malaysian who was buried in Eyup Cemetery. He was bestowed with the title "Şehıdımız" (Our Martyr) by Turkish people.
- Mahfiruz Hatun or Mahfiruz Sultan(c.1590– c.1620), was a consort of Ottoman Sultan Ahmed I (r. 1603–17) and mother of Sultan Osman II (r. 1618–22). She was buried in the large sanctuary .
- Mahmud Esad Coşan (1938–2001) was a Turkish academic author, preacher, professor of Islam and Naqshbandi leader.

== See also ==
- Eyüp Sultan Mosque
- List of cemeteries in Turkey
- Eyüp Gondola
