= Mohd Kamal Hassan =

Malaysian academic (1942–2023)

Yang Berbahagia Tan Sri Mohd Kamal Hassan PSM JSM

3rd Rector of the International Islamic University Malaysia
- In office 5 April 1998 – 31 May 2006
- Chancellor: Sultan Ahmad Shah
- Preceded by: Abdul Hamid Abu Sulayman
- Succeeded by: Syed Arabi Idid

Personal details
- Born: 26 October 1942 Pasir Mas, Kelantan, Japanese occupation of Malaya
- Died: 23 February 2023 (aged 80) Kuala Lumpur, Malaysia
- Education: University of Malaya; Columbia University
- Occupation: Researcher

Mohd Kamal bin Hassan (26 October 1942 – 23 February 2023) was a Malaysian academic and Islamic scholar, specializing in contemporary Islamic thought, particularly pertaining to the Southeast Asia region. He was the Rector of the International Islamic University Malaysia (IIUM) from 1998 to 2006.

== Education background ==
Kamal Hassan attended Sultan Ismail School in Kota Bharu. He attained his bachelor's degree in Islamic studies from University of Malaya (UM) in 1965. He furthered his postgraduate studies in Columbia University, where he obtained the degree of Master of Arts in 1970, Master of Philosophy in 1972 and Doctor of Philosophy in 1975.

== Career ==
Kamal Hassan started his academic career at the National University of Malaysia, where he chaired the Department of Usuluddin and Philosophy in 1979 and was later made a full professor. He then joined IIUM, where he founded the Faculty of Islamic Revealed Knowledge and Human Sciences in 1983. He succeeded Abdul Hamid Ahmad Abu Sulayman as the third Rector of IIUM on 5 April 1998 and served in the office before passing it onto Professor Dato' Sri Syed Arabi Syed Abdullah Idid.

To mark his contributions to the country, he was chosen to be a National Academic Figure in 2017. He left IIUM on 30 July 2018 after 42 years of service to Malaysian education, on which IIUM awarded him the title of professor emeritus. Before exiting IIUM, he was a Distinguished Professor at its Centre of Islamisation. He was one of three academicians in Malaysia who was promoted to the rank of Distinguished Professor by the Ministry of Higher Education in 2010.

== Death ==
Kamal Hassan died from complications of surgery on 23 February 2023, at the age of 80.

== Honours ==
- Malaysia :
  - Commander of the Order of Loyalty to the Crown of Malaysia (PSM) – Tan Sri (2006)
  - Companion of the Order of Loyalty to the Crown of Malaysia (JSM) (1988)
