= Selangor Islamic University =

Private university in Selangor, Malaysia

- Universiti Islam Selangor
- Former name: Kolej Universiti Islam Antarabangsa Selangor (Selangor International Islamic University College)
- Motto: Pemangkin Tradisi Ilmu
- Motto in English: The Catalyst of Knowledge Tradition
- Type: Private
- Established: 1995
- Vice-Chancellor: Mohd Farid Ravi Bin Abdullah
- Director: Dato’ Haji Haris Bin Kasim
- Location: Bangi, Selangor, Malaysia
- Website: www.kuis.edu.my

The Selangor Islamic University (UIS; Malay: Universiti Islam Selangor) is a private university located in Bandar Seri Putra, Bangi, Selangor. The university was formerly a university college, before upgraded to a full-fledged university on 13 October 2022. The Sultan of Selangor, Sultan Sharafuddin Idris Shah, had presented the official instrument of the change to Higher Education Ministry secretary-general Abdul Razak Jaafar at Istana Bukit Kayangan. The university moved to its current location in 2000, when the new campus was officially opened by Sultan Sharafuddin Idris Shah.

== Rectors ==
The list of Rectors since the institution was established.

#	Rector	Term in office
Formerly known as KUIS
1	Prof. Dr. Haji Zainudin Bin Jaffar	1996 - 2002
2	Dato' Mohamad Adanan Bin Isman	2002 - 2010
3	Prof. Dato' Dr. Azizuddin Bin Ahmad	2010 - 2013
4	Prof. Dato' Dr. Ab Halim Bin Tamuri	2013 - 2021
5	Prof. Madya Dato' Dr. Mohd Farid Ravi Bin Abdullah	1 January 2022 - 12 October 2022
Known as UIS since October 2022
5	Prof. Madya Dato' Dr. Mohd Farid Ravi Bin Abdullah	13 October 2022–present

== See also ==
- List of Islamic educational institutions
