= Pahang =

State of Malaysia

- State
- State of Pahang; Negeri Pahang (Malay)
- Flag Coat of arms
- Nickname(s): Darul Makmur (Abode of Tranquility)
- Motto: Ya Latif; O God the Gentle
- Anthem: Allah Rahmatkan Raja Kami (English: "Allah, Bless Our King")
- Pahang in Malaysia
- Country: Malaysia
- Establishment of the sultanate: 1882
- Federated Malay States: 1895
- Japanese occupation: 1942
- Accession into the Federation of Malaya: 1948
- Declaration of Independence: 31 August 1957
- Capital and largest city: Kuantan; 3°49′N 103°20′E
- Royal capital: Pekan
- Official languages: Malay
- Recognised regional languages: Pahang Malay; Terengganu Malay; Semai; Semelai; Temiar; Jah Hut; Others
- Ethnic groups (2020): 81.0% Bumiputera; 14.7% Chinese; 3.7% Indian; 0.6% Other ethnicities
- Religion (2020): 76.5% Sunni Islam (official); 13.6% Buddhism; 4.1% No religion; 3.7% Hinduism; 1.5% Christianity; 0.7% Others
- Demonym(s): Pahangite, Pahangese
- Government: Federated parliamentary constitutional monarchy
  - Sultan: Abdullah
  - Menteri Besar: Wan Rosdy Wan Ismail (BN–UMNO)
- Legislature: Legislative Assembly

Area
  - Total: 36,005.95 km^{2} (13,901.98 sq mi)
- Highest elevation (Mount Tahan): 2,187 m (7,175 ft)

Population
  - 2025 census: 1,678,272
  - Density: 47/km^{2} (121.7/sq mi) (14th)
- GDP (PPP): 2024 estimate
  - Total: $59.122 billion (8th)
  - Per capita: $35,441 (8th)
- GDP (nominal): 2024 estimate
  - Total: $18.072 billion (8th)
  - Per capita: $10,833 (8th)
- Gini (2022): ▼0.308 low
- HDI (2024): ▲0.808 very high · 9th
- Currency: Malaysian ringgit (RM/MYR)
- Time zone: UTC+8 (Malaysian Time)
- Date format: dd-mm-yyyy
- Driving side: Left
- Calling code: 09 (Pahang except as noted); 05 (Cameron Highlands); 03 (Genting Highlands)
- Postal code: 25xxx to 28xxx, 39xxx, 49000, 69000
- ISO 3166 code: MY-06
- Number plate prefixes: C
- Website: pahang.gov.my

Pahang (Malay pronunciation: [paˈhaŋ]; Pahang Hulu Malay: Paha, Pahang Hilir Malay: Pahaeng, Ulu Tembeling Malay: Pahaq), officially Pahang Darul Makmur with the Arabic honorific Darul Makmur (lit. 'The Abode of Tranquility'), is a state of Malaysia. It is the third largest state in the country and the largest state in Peninsular Malaysia, covering a total land area of 36,005.95 km^{2} (13,901.98 sq mi), and the ninth most populous. The state occupies the basin of the Pahang River, and a stretch of the east coast as far south as Endau. The state borders the Malaysian states of Kelantan and Terengganu to the north, Perak, Selangor and Negeri Sembilan to the west and Johor to the south, with the South China Sea is to the east. Pahang is separated from the west coast states by the Titiwangsa Mountains that forms a natural divider between the peninsula's east and west coasts from north to south, and from Terengganu in the east by the Pantai Timur Range. The state's highest elevation culminates at Mount Tahan in the eponymous Tahan Range, which is 2,187 metres (7,175 ft) high. Although over 56.8% of the state is covered by permanent forest reserves, its central plains are intersected by numerous rivers, and along the coast there is a 32-kilometre (20 mi) wide expanse of alluvial soil that includes the deltas and estuarine plains of the Kuantan, Pahang, Rompin, Endau, and Mersing Rivers.

The state is divided into 11 districts (daerah) – Pekan, Rompin, Maran, Temerloh, Jerantut, Bentong, Raub, Lipis, Cameron Highlands, Bera and Kuantan – which are administered by 12 local authorities. The largest district is Jerantut, which covers 7,304.55 km^{2} (2,820.30 sq mi) and serves as the main gateway to the Taman Negara national park. Pahang's capital and largest city, Kuantan, is the eighth largest urban area by population in Malaysia. The royal capital and the official seat of the Sultan of Pahang is located at Pekan. Pekan was also the old state capital and its name translates literally into 'the town', it was known historically as 'Inderapura'. Other major towns include Temerloh, Raub, Bentong, Jerantut, Kuala Lipis and its hill resorts of Genting Highlands, Bukit Tinggi, and Cameron Highlands. The head of state is the Sultan of Pahang, while the head of government is the Menteri Besar. The government system is closely modelled on the Westminster parliamentary system. The state religion of Pahang is Islam, but allows other religions in its territory.

Archaeological evidence shows that humans have inhabited the area that is now Pahang since as early as the Paleolithic age. The early settlements gradually developed into an ancient maritime trading state by the 3rd century. In the 5th century, the Old Pahang Kingdom sent envoys to the Liu Song court. During the time of Langkasuka, Srivijaya and Ligor, Pahang was one of the outlying dependencies. In the 15th century, the Pahang Sultanate became an autonomous kingdom within the Malacca Sultanate. Pahang entered into a dynastic union with the Johor Sultanate in the early 17th century and later emerged as an autonomous kingdom in the late 18th century. Following the bloody Pahang Civil War that concluded in 1863, the state under Tun Ahmad of the Bendahara dynasty, was eventually restored as a sultanate in 1881. In 1895, Pahang became a British protectorate along with Perak, Selangor and Negeri Sembilan. During the World War II, Pahang and other states of Malaya were occupied by the Empire of Japan from 1941 to 1945. After the war, Pahang became part of the Malayan Union before being absorbed into the Federation of Malaya which gained full independence from the British.

Modern Pahang is an economically important state with main activities in the services, manufacturing and agricultural sectors. As part of the East Coast Economic Region, it is a key region for the manufacturing sector, with the local logistics support network serving as a hub for the east coast region of Peninsular Malaysia. Over the years, the state has attracted much investment, both local and foreign, in the mineral sector. Important mineral exports include iron ore, gold, tin and bauxite. Malaysia's substantial oil and natural gas fields lie offshore in the South China Sea. At one time, timber resources also brought much wealth to the state. Large-scale development projects have resulted in the clearing of hundreds of square miles of land for oil palm and rubber plantations and the resettling of several hundred thousand people in new villages under federal agencies and institutions like FELDA, FELCRA and RISDA.

== Etymology ==
The Khmer word for tin is pāhang (ប៉ាហាំង) and it is phonetically identical to ڤهڠ (note that the Jawi spelling, literally, "phŋ", deviates from modern Dewan Bahasa dan Pustaka rules although its sound is unmistakably /paahaŋ/, note that the long ā sound is not explicitly rendered or stressed in old Jawi, just like ڤد). Since the tin mines at Sungai Lembing had been known since ancient times and that the Malay Peninsula was within the sphere of influence of Khmer civilisation, William Linehan hypothesized that the name of the state was named after the Khmer word for tin (note that tin-rich Perak is also etymologically linked to tin).

This lexemic starting point can be used to explain other derivatives terms such as the Pahang River, Mahang the place (name given to Pahang by Jakuns), Mahang the tree (Macaranga, a common tree species in secondary forests, likely named after the toponym of the same phoneme). The Proto-Malays of Sungai Bebar who interacted with Trito-Malays likely acquired the term from their city counterparts. The theories that the state was named after the river or tree are unsatisfactory as they do not explain how the river or the tree got their names.

There were many variations of the name Pahang outside the Malay world. For examples, Song dynasty author Zhao Rukuo (趙汝适) wrote in Zhufanzhi (諸蕃志) (circa 1225) that Phong-hong (蓬豐 romanised according to Southern Min dialect since Zhao was from Quanzhou) was a dependency of Srivijaya. The transition from Inderapura to Pahang, approximately around the Song period indicates that Khmer influence on the state was weakened and displaced by that of Srivijaya and Majapahit.

During the Yuan dynasty, Pahang was known as Phenn-Khenn (彭坑) in Daoyi Zhilue (島夷志略) (circa 1349), and in Ming Shilu (明實錄) (circa 1378), it was transliterated as Pen-Heng (湓亨), and in Haiguo Wenjianlu (海國聞見錄) (circa 1730), compiled in the Qing period, Pahang was transliterated as (邦項) (Pang-hang).

Arabs and Europeans, transliterated Pahang to Pam, Pan, Paam, Paon, Phaan, Phang, Paham, Pahan, Pahaun, Phaung, Phahangh.

== History ==
Historical affiliations

Old Pahang 5–15th century
Pahang Sultanate 1470–1623
Old Johor Sultanate 1623–1770
Pahang Kingdom 1770–1881
Federated Malay States 1895–1941
Empire of Japan 1942–1945
Malayan Union 1946–1948
Federation of Malaya 1948–1963
Malaysia 1963–present

=== Prehistory ===
Archaeological evidence shows that humans have inhabited the area that is now Pahang since as early as the Paleolithic. Relics of a of Mesolithic civilisation that used using paleolithic implements have been found at Gunung Senyum. Chipped Paleolithic artefacts without traces of polishing have been discovered at Sungai Lembing, Kuantan, from the remains of a 6,000 years old civilisation. Traces of Hoabinhian culture are represented by a number of limestone cave sites. Late Neolithic relics are abundant, including polished tools, quoit discs, stone ear pendants, stone bracelets and cross-hatched bark pounders. By around 400 BCE, the development of bronze casting led to the flourishing of the Đông Sơn culture, notably for its elaborate bronze war drums.

The early iron civilisation in Pahang that began around the beginning of Common Era is associated by prehistorians with the late neolithic culture. Relics from this era, found along the rivers are particularly numerous in the Tembeling Valley, which served as the old main northern highway of communication. Ancient gold workings in Pahang are thought to date back to this early Iron Age as well.

=== Hindu-Buddhist Era ===
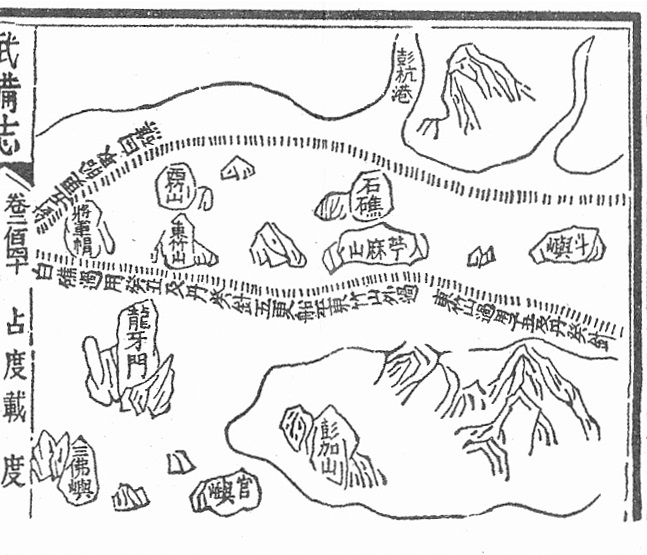
The 17th century Mao Kun map based on the early 15th century navigation maps of Zheng He showing Pahang River estuary (彭杭港), Pulau Siribuat (石礁) and Tioman Island (苧麻山)

The Kra Isthmus region of the Malay Peninsula and its peripheries are recognised by historians as the cradle of Malayic civilisations. Primordial Malayic kingdoms are described as tributaries to Funan by the 2nd century Chinese sources. Ancient settlements in Pahang can be traced from Tembeling to as far south as Merchong. Their tracks can also be found in the deep hinterland of Jelai, along the Chini Lake, and up to the head-waters of the Rompin. One such settlement was identified as Koli in Geographia or Kiu-Li, centred on the estuary of Pahang River south of Langkasuka, that flourished in the 3rd century CE. It possessed an important international port, where many foreign ships stopped to barter and resupply. In common with most of the states in the Malay Peninsula during that time, Kiu-Li was in contact with Funan. The Chinese records mention that an embassy sent to Funan by the Indian King Murunda sailed from Kiu-Li's port (between 240 and 245 CE). Murunda presented to the Funanese King Fan Chang four horses from the Yuezhi (Kushan) stud farms.

By the middle of the 5th century, a polity suggested to be ancient Pahang, was described in the Book of Song as Pohuang or Panhuang (婆皇). The king of Pohuang, She-li Po-luo-ba-mo ('Sri Bhadravarman'), was recorded to have sent an envoy to the Liu Song court in 449–450. In 456–457, another envoy of the same country arrived at the Chinese capital, Jiankang. This ancient Pahang is believed to have been established later as a mueang to the mandala of Langkasuka-Kedah centred in modern-day Patani region that rose to prominence with the regression of Funan from the 6th century. By the beginning of the 8th century, Langkasuka-Kedah came under the military and political hegemony of Srivijaya. In the 11th century, the power vacuum left by the collapse of Srivijaya was filled by the Nakhon Si Thammarat Kingdom, commonly known in Malay tradition as 'Ligor'. During this period, Pahang, designated as Muaeng Pahang was established as one of the twelve naksat city states of Ligor.

In the 14th century, Pahang began consolidating its influence in the southern part of the Malay Peninsula. The kingdom, described by Portuguese historian, Manuel Godinho de Erédia as Pam, was one of the two kingdoms of Malayos in the peninsula, in succession to Pattani, that flourished before the establishment of the Malacca Sultanate. The Maharaja of Pahang, was also the overlord of countries of Ujong Tanah ('land's end'), on the southern part of the peninsula including Temasek. The Majapahit chronicle, Nagarakretagama even used the name Pahang to designate the Malay Peninsula, an indication of the importance of this kingdom. The History of Ming records several envoy missions from Pahang to the Ming court in the 14th and 15th centuries. In 1378, Maharaja Tajau sent envoys with a letter on a gold leaf and sent six foreign slaves and products of the country as tribute. In 1411, during the reign of Maharaja Pa-la-mi-so-la-ta-lo-si-ni (transliterated by historian as 'Parameswara Teluk Chini'), he also sent envoys carrying tribute.

=== Old sultanate ===
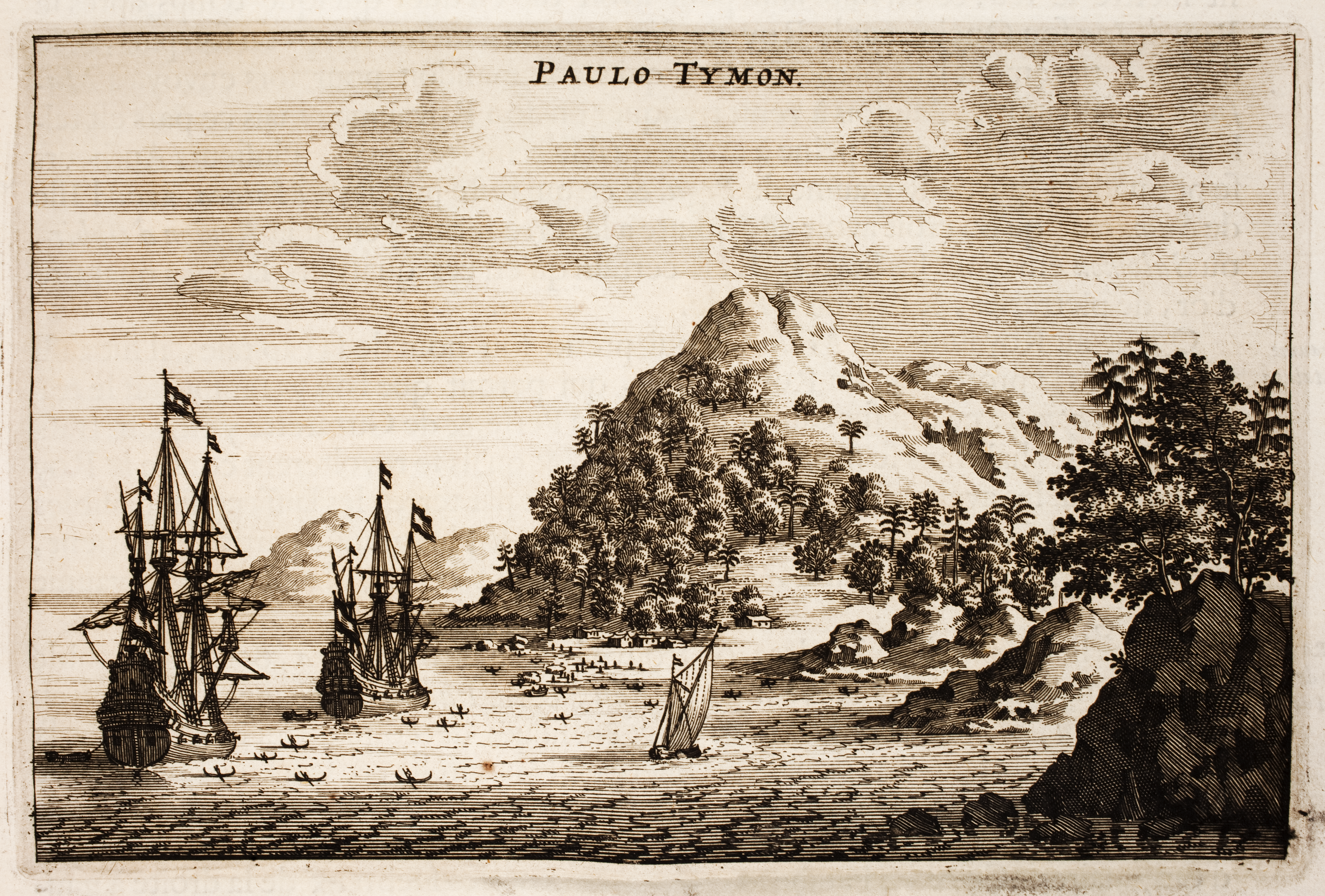
Tioman Island in 1665

The Old Pahang Sultanate centred in modern-day Pekan was established in the 15th century. At the height of its influence, the sultanate was an important power in Southeast Asia and controlled the entire Pahang basin, bordering the Pattani Sultanate to the north and the Johor Sultanate to the south. To the west, its jurisdiction extended over parts of modern-day Selangor and Negeri Sembilan.

The sultanate has its origin as a vassal to the Malacca Sultanate, with its first sultan, Muhammad Shah having been a Malaccan prince, and was the grandson of Dewa Sura, the last pre-Malaccan ruler of Pahang. Over the years, Pahang grew independent from Malaccan control and at one point even established itself as a rival to Malacca until the latter's demise in 1511. In 1528, the last Sultan of Malacca, Mahmud Shah died. Pahang joined forces with his successor, Alauddin Riayat Shah II who established himself in Johor to expel the Portuguese from the Malay Peninsula. Two attempts were made in 1547 at Muar and in 1551 at Portuguese Malacca. However, in the face of superior Portuguese arms and vessels, the Pahang and Johor forces were forced to retreat on both occasions.

During the reign of Sultan Abdul Kadir, Pahang enjoyed a brief period of cordial relations with the Portuguese. However, this relationship was discontinued by his successor, Sultan Ahmad II. The next ruler, Sultan Abdul Ghafur attacked the Portuguese and simultaneously challenged the Dutch presence in the Strait of Malacca. Nevertheless, in 1607, Pahang not only tolerated the Dutch, but, following a visit by Admiral Matelief de Jonge, even cooperated with them in an attempt to get rid of the Portuguese.

The Sultan tried to reforge the Johor-Pahang alliance to assist the Dutch. However, a quarrel which erupted between Sultan Abdul Ghafur and Alauddin Riayat Shah III of Johor, resulted in Johor declaring war on Pahang in 1612. With the aid of Sultan Abdul Jalilul Akbar of Brunei, Pahang eventually defeated Johor in 1613. Sultan Abdul Ghafur's son, Alauddin Riyat Shah ascended to the throne in 1614. In 1615, the Acehnese under Iskandar Muda invaded Pahang, forcing Alauddin Riayat Shah to retreat into the interior. He nevertheless continued to exercise some ruling powers. His reign in exile is considered to have officially ended after the installation of a distant relative, Raja Bujang to the Pahangese throne in 1615, with the support of the Portuguese following a pact between the Portuguese and Sultan of Johor.

Raja Bujang who reigned as Abdul Jalil Shah was eventually deposed in the Acehnese invasion in 1617, but restored to the Pahangese throne and also installed as the new Sultan of Johor following the death of his uncle, Abdullah Ma'ayat Shah in 1623. This event led to the union of the crown of Pahang and Johor, and the formal establishment of the Johor Empire.

=== Modern history ===
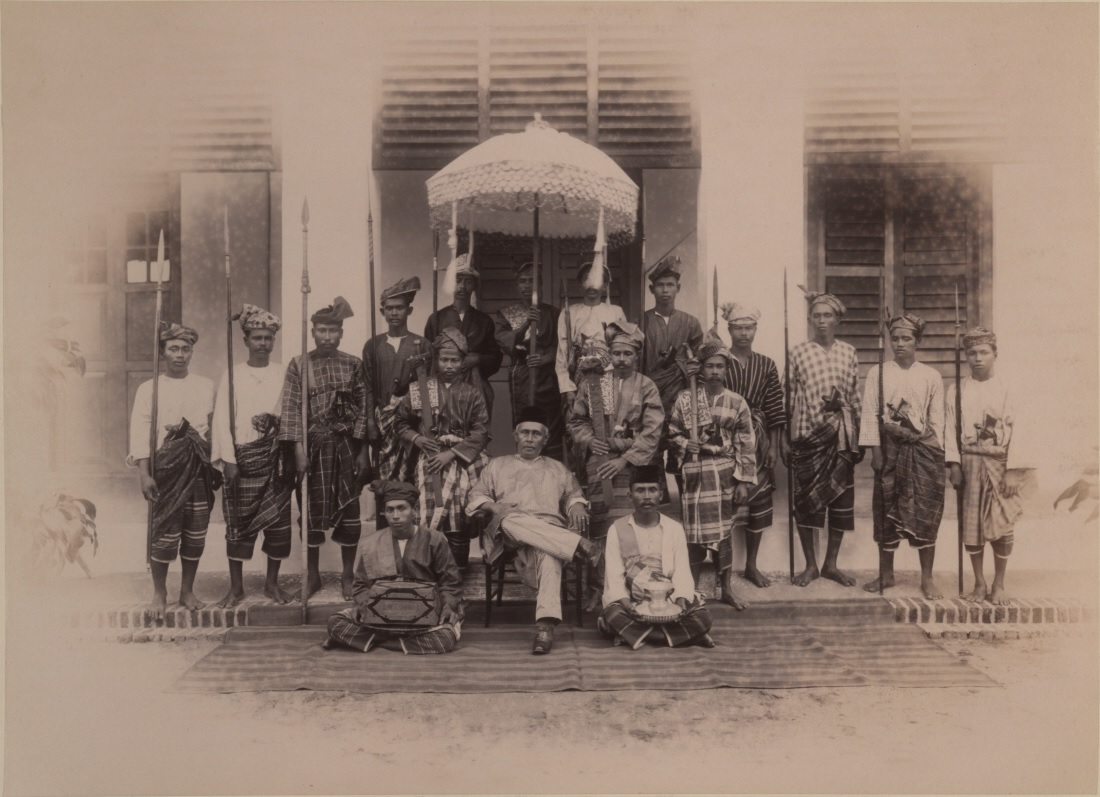
Sultan Ahmad and his attendants circa 1897. The ruler seized the Pahang throne in 1863 after six years of civil war against his brother Tun Mutahir and his British-Johor allies. His reign marked the restoration of Pahang as a Sultanate and modernisation of the state.

The modern Pahang kingdom came into existence with the consolidation of power by the Bendahara family in Pahang, following the gradual disintegration of Johor Empire. Self-rule was established in Pahang in the late 18th century, with Tun Abdul Majid declared as the first raja bendahara. The area around Pahang formed a part of the hereditary domains attached to this title and administered directly by the raja bendahara. The weakening of the Johor Sultanate and the disputed succession to the throne was coupled with the increasing independence of the Bendahara in Pahang, the Temenggong in Johor and Singapore, and the Yamtuan Muda in Riau.

In 1853, the fourth raja bendahara Tun Ali, renounced his allegiance to the Sultan of Johor and became the independent ruler of Pahang. He was able to maintain peace and stability during his reign. After his death in 1857 his younger son Wan Ahmad challenged the succession of his half-brother Tun Mutahir, in a dispute that escalated into a civil war. Supported by the neighbouring Terengganu Sultanate and the Siamese, Wan Ahmad emerged victorious, establishing control over important towns and expelled his brother in 1863. He served as the last raja bendahara, and was proclaimed Sultan of Pahang by his chiefs in 1881.

Due to internal strife within Pahang, the British pressured Sultan Ahmad to agree to the presence of a British adviser. Aided by Sultan Abu Bakar of Johor and William Fraser of the Pahang Mining Company, they succeeded in convincing Sultan Ahmad to accept a British agent, Hugh Clifford, in December 1887. In October 1888, Sultan Ahmad reluctantly accepted John Pickersgill Rodger as Pahang's first resident. Following the intervention, Sultan Ahmad became a Ruler-in-Council and acted in accordance with the advice of the British Resident and the State Council, except in matters pertaining Islam and Malay customs. Taxes were to be collected in the name of the sultan by the Resident, with the assistance of European officers.

Between 1890 and 1895, Dato' Bahaman, the Orang Kaya Setia Perkasa Pahlawan of Semantan, and Imam Perang Rasu, the Orang Kaya Imam Perang Indera Gajah of Pulau Tawar, led a revolt against the British encroachment. Sultan Ahmad appeared to be co-operating with the British, but he was known to be sympathetic to the dissidents. By 1895 the revolt was suppressed by the British and many of the dissidents surrendered. In July 1895, Sultan Ahmad signed the Federation Agreement, which made Pahang, along with Perak, Selangor and Negeri Sembilan, one of the Federated Malay States, a protectorate of the British Empire. This had effectively reduced the Sultan's powers and authority, as did the creation of Federal Council in 1909. The executive and legislative functions of the State Council became increasingly nominal.

Like other Malay States, Pahang suffered during the Japanese occupation of Malaya until 1945. During the Japanese Occupation, the reigning Sultan Abu Bakar opened a large potato plantation behind the Terentang Palace to help ease the food shortage and he personally approved proposals to form the Askar Wataniah, an underground Malay resistance force. The Sultan spent the final days of the occupation in a jungle hideout with members of Force 136, resistance fighters and refugees. In late 1945, to mark the decommissioning of the Askar Wataniah, the troops paraded through Pekan and submitted to a royal inspection, after which they were honoured at the Sa'adah Palace with what has been called 'the first ronggeng of the liberation'.

During his reign, Sultan Abu Bakar revived the office of State Mufti and established the Pahang Islamic and Malay Customs Council. The state's administrative capital, which was established in Kuala Lipis during British intervention, was moved to Kuantan.

After World War II, Pahang formed the Federation of Malaya with the other eight Malay States and two British Crown Colonies, Malacca and Penang in 1948. The semi-independent Malaya was granted independence in 1957, and was then reconstituted as Malaysia with the inclusion the states of Singapore (left the federation in 1965), Sabah and Sarawak in 1963.

== Geography ==
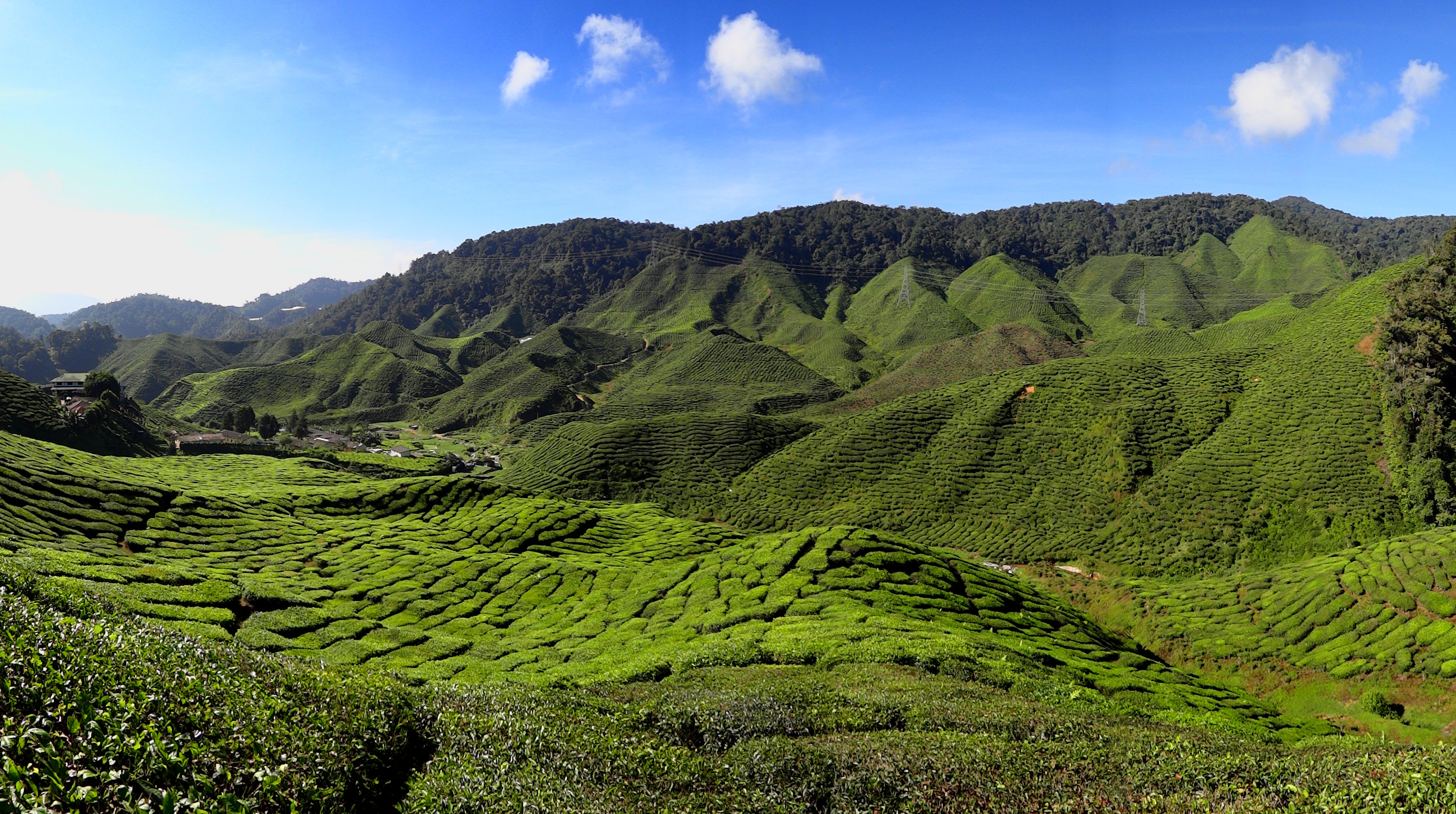
Cameron Highlands

Pahang covers a land area of 36,005.95 km^{2} (13,901.98 sq mi), making it the third largest state in Malaysia after Sabah and Sarawak, and the largest in Peninsular Malaysia. Geographically diverse, Pahang occupies the vast Pahang River basin, which is enclosed by the Titiwangsa Range to the west and the eastern highlands to the north. Permanent forest reserves account for 20,468.21 km^{2} (7,902.82 sq mi) or 56.85% of the state's total landmass, and its central plains are intersected by numerous rivers, joining to form the Pahang River which dominates the drainage system. Pahang is divided into three ecoregions, the freshwater systems, the lowlands and highlands rainforests and the coastline.

The Pahang River basin connects with Malaysia's two largest natural freshwater lakes, Bera and Chini. Described as wetland of international importance, Bera Lake was accepted as Malaysia's first Ramsar site in 1994.

The highest peak, Mount Tahan, reaches 2,187 m (7,175 ft) in elevation, which is also the highest point in Peninsular Malaysia. The climate is temperate enough to have distinct temperature variations year round, and much of the highlands are covered with tropical rainforest. Pahang is home to two of Malaysia's national parks, Taman Negara and Endau-Rompin, both located in the north and south of the state respectively. These large primary rainforests are extensive, and are home to many rare or endangered animals, such as the tapir, mouse-deer, tigers, elephants and leopards. Ferns are also extremely common, mainly due to the high humidity and fog that permeates the area. Popular hill resorts located along these main highland areas are Cameron Highlands, Genting Highlands, Fraser's Hill and Bukit Tinggi. The Cameron Highlands is home to extensive tea plantations and also a major supplier of legumes and vegetables to both Malaysia and Singapore. The largest of Felda's palm oil plantations in Malaysia are located in the Jengka Triangle centred around the Bandar Tun Razak in Maran district.

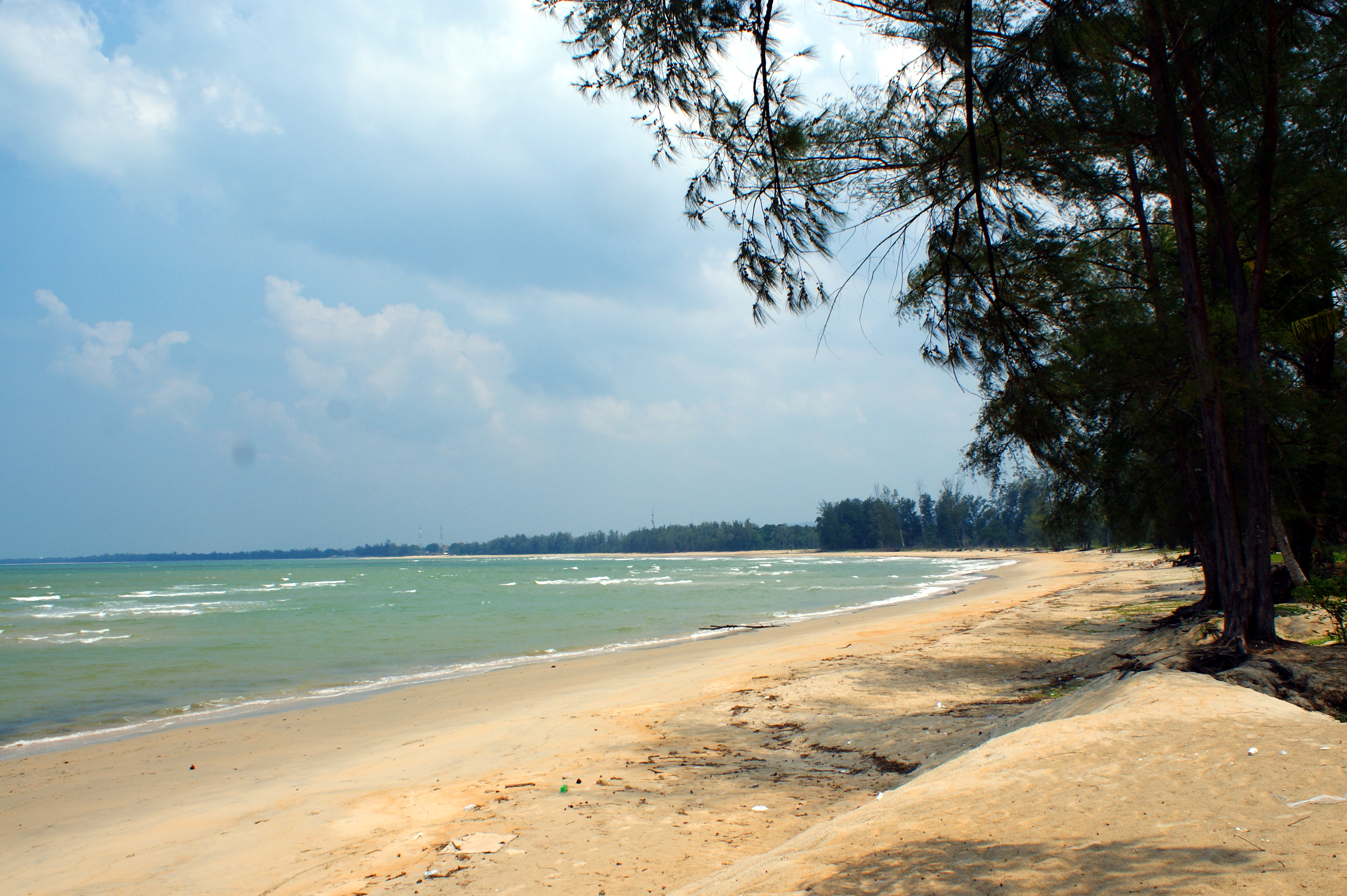
Cherating beach

Pahang's long, coastline has sandy beaches like Cherating, Teluk Cempedak, Beserah, Batu Hitam and Tanjung Sepat. Also located along the coastal plain, is a 32 km^{2} (12 sq mi) wide expanse of alluvial soil that includes the deltas and estuarine plains of the Kuantan, Pahang, Rompin, Endau, and Mersing Rivers. Important economic centres can be found along the coastline, where both capital and royal capital of the state, Kuantan and Pekan, are located. About 58 km off the coast of Pahang lies Tioman Island, in the South China Sea, acclaimed as one of the best island getaways in the world.

Pahang has a tropical geography with an equatorial climate and a year-round of humidity of no less than 75%. It is warm and humid throughout the year with temperatures ranging from 21 °C to 33 °C. The rainfall here averages 200 mm monthly, a large proportion of which occurs during the northeast monsoon. Precipitation is the lowest in March, with an average of 22.25 mm. In October and November, the precipitation reaches its peak, with an average of 393 mm. The hottest month in Pahang is May when the average maximum temperature is 33°, average temperature is 28° and average minimum temperature is 24°. At highland areas, the temperature can vary from 23 °C (73 °F) during daytime to 16 °C (61 °F) during night time.

Pahang experiences two monsoon seasons: a northeast monsoon and a southwest monsoon. The tropical storms of the northeast monsoon wash ashore from the end of October until the beginning of March ever year, bringing heavy rainfall, powerful currents and unpredictable tempest of the monsoon season coming in from the South China Sea. The southwest monsoon, which occurs beginning March every year, brings somewhat less rainfall, with sunny and tropical weather up until the end of October.

Landscapes of Pahang

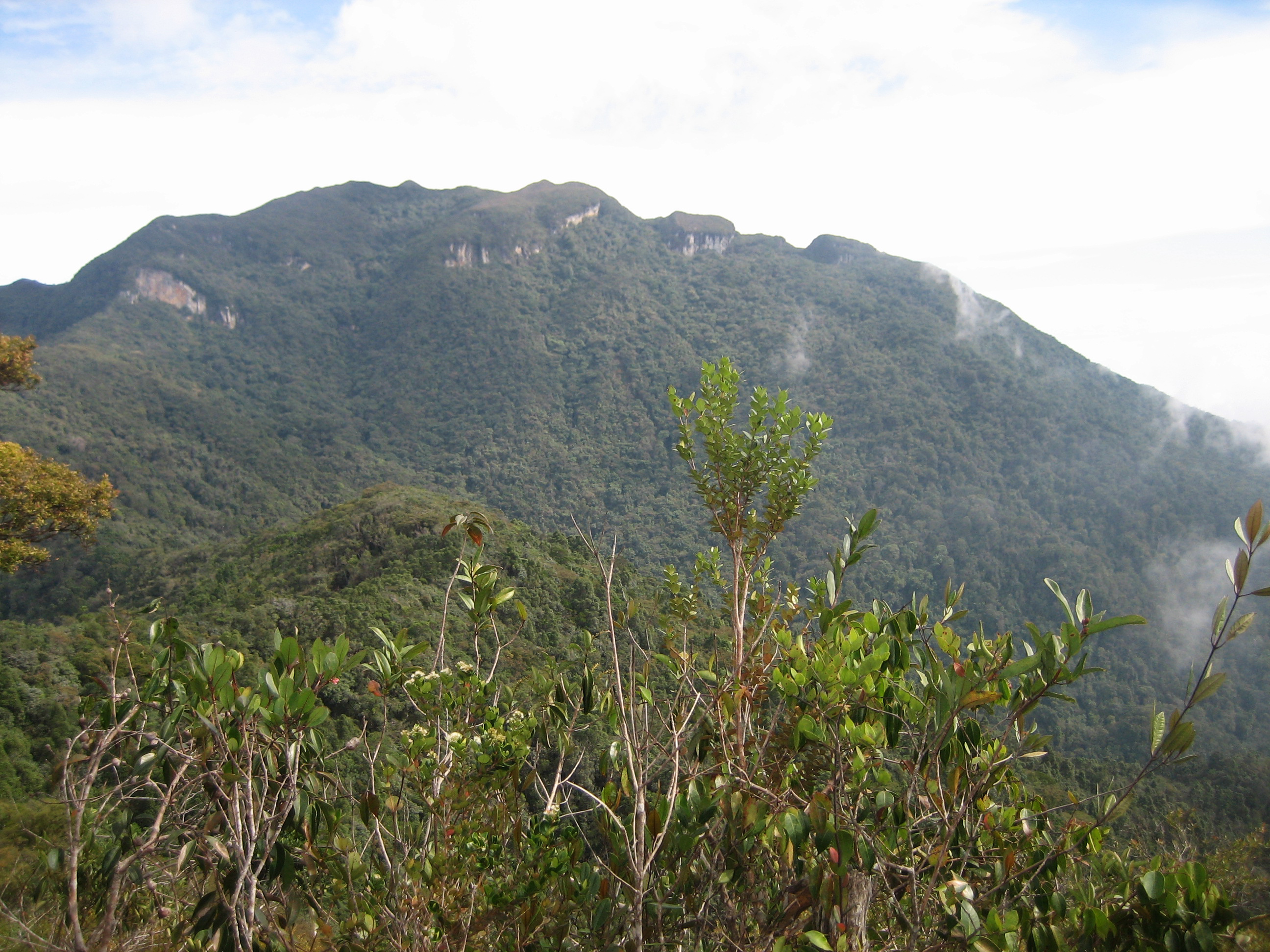
Mount Tahan, the highest mountain of Peninsular Malaysia

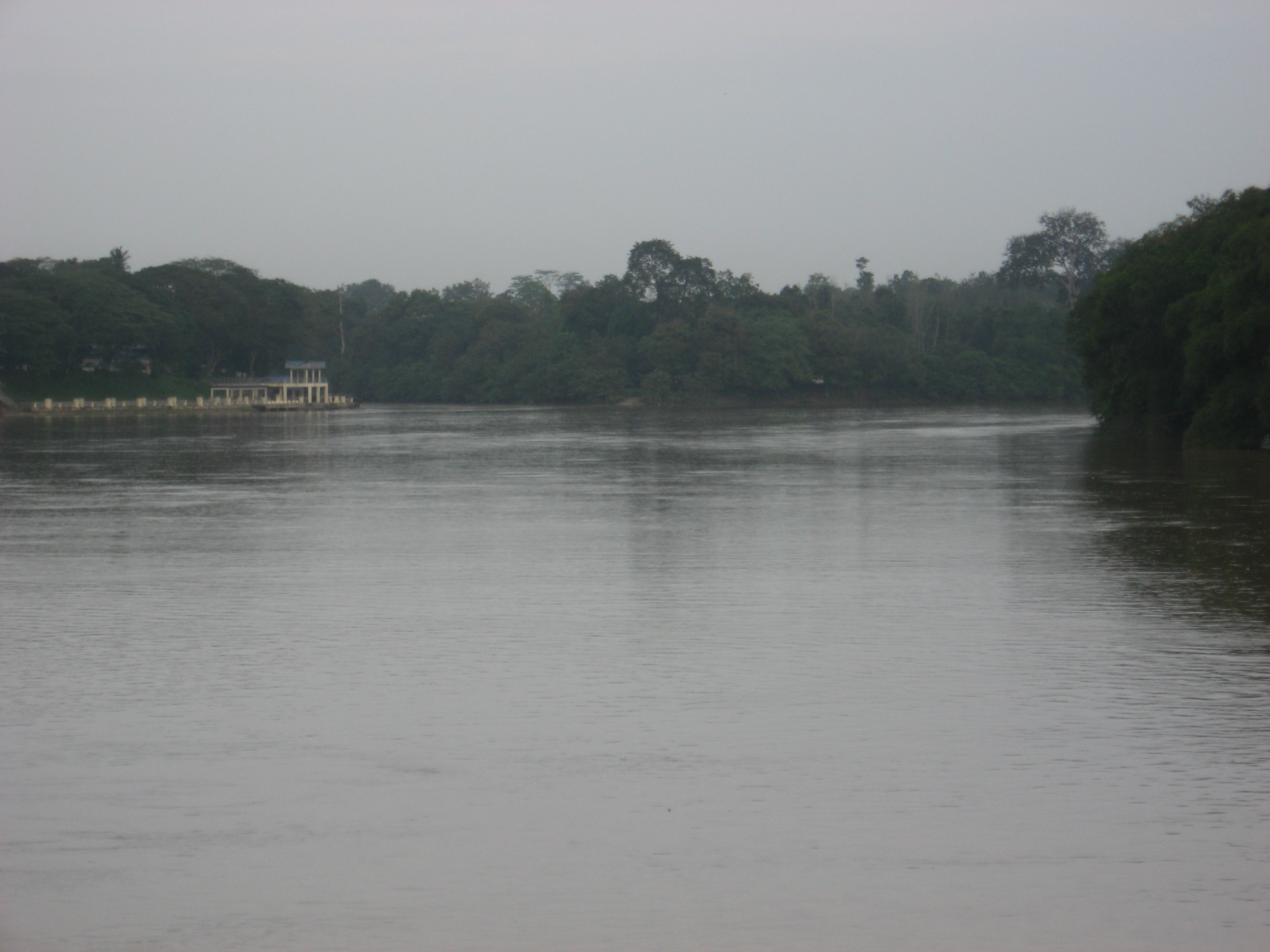
Pahang River

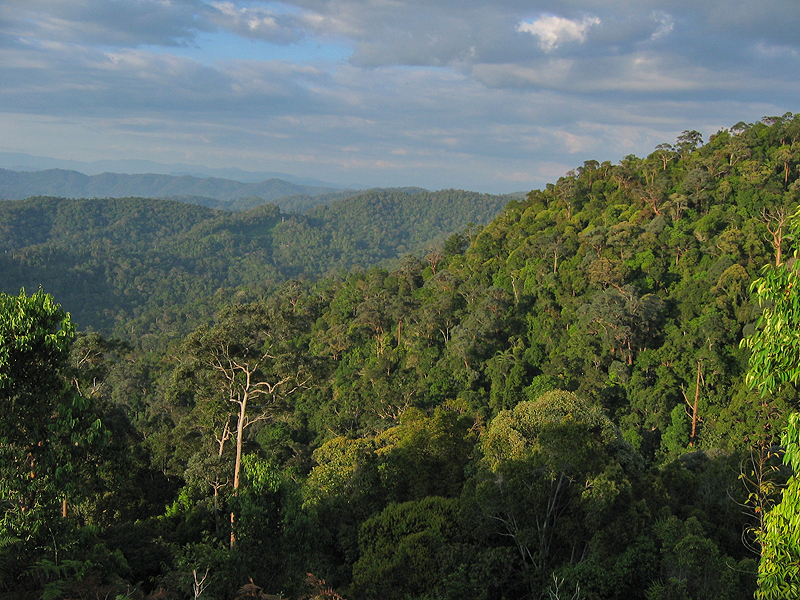
View of Taman Negara

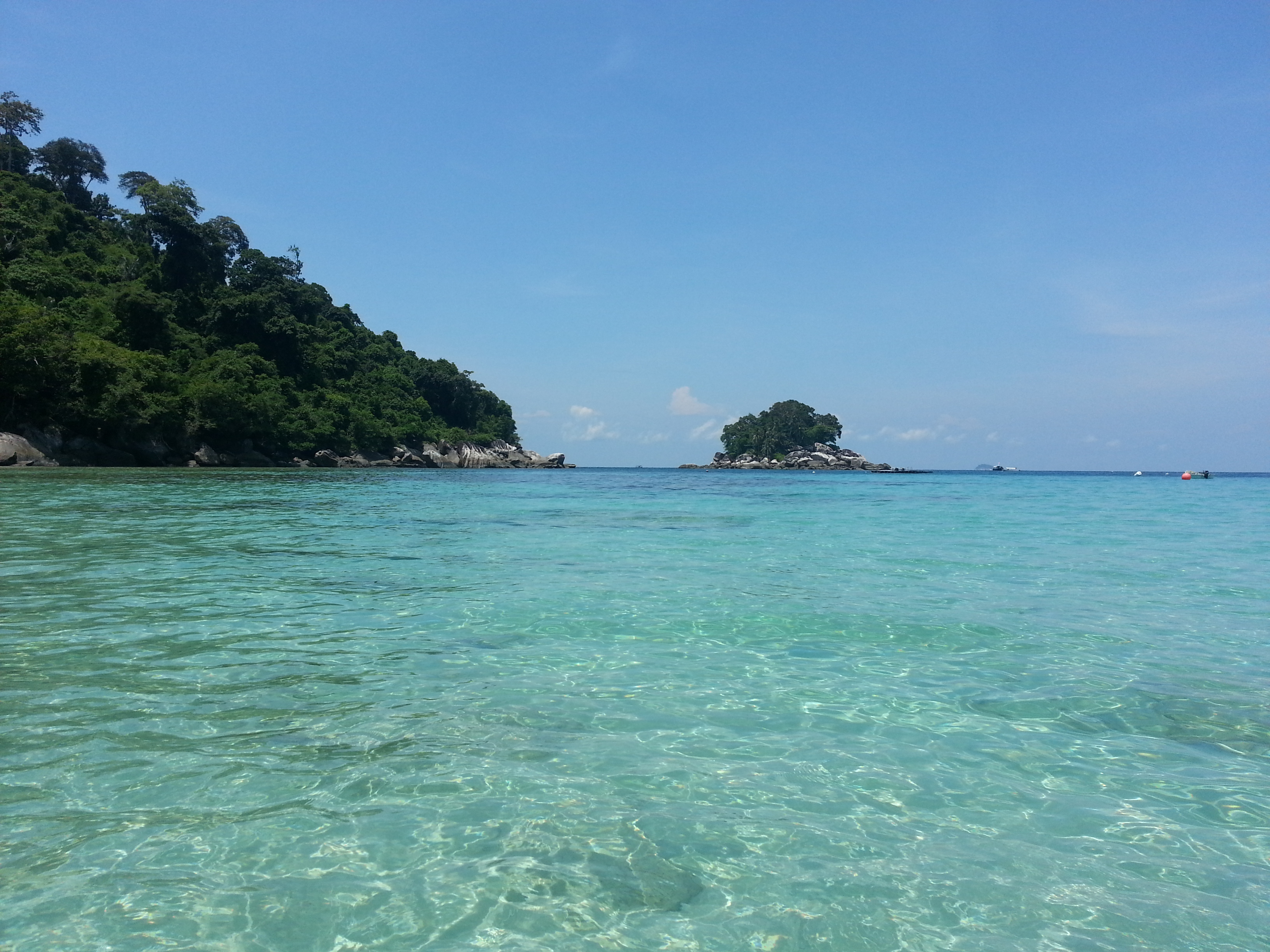
South China Sea view from Tioman Island

=== Biodiversity ===
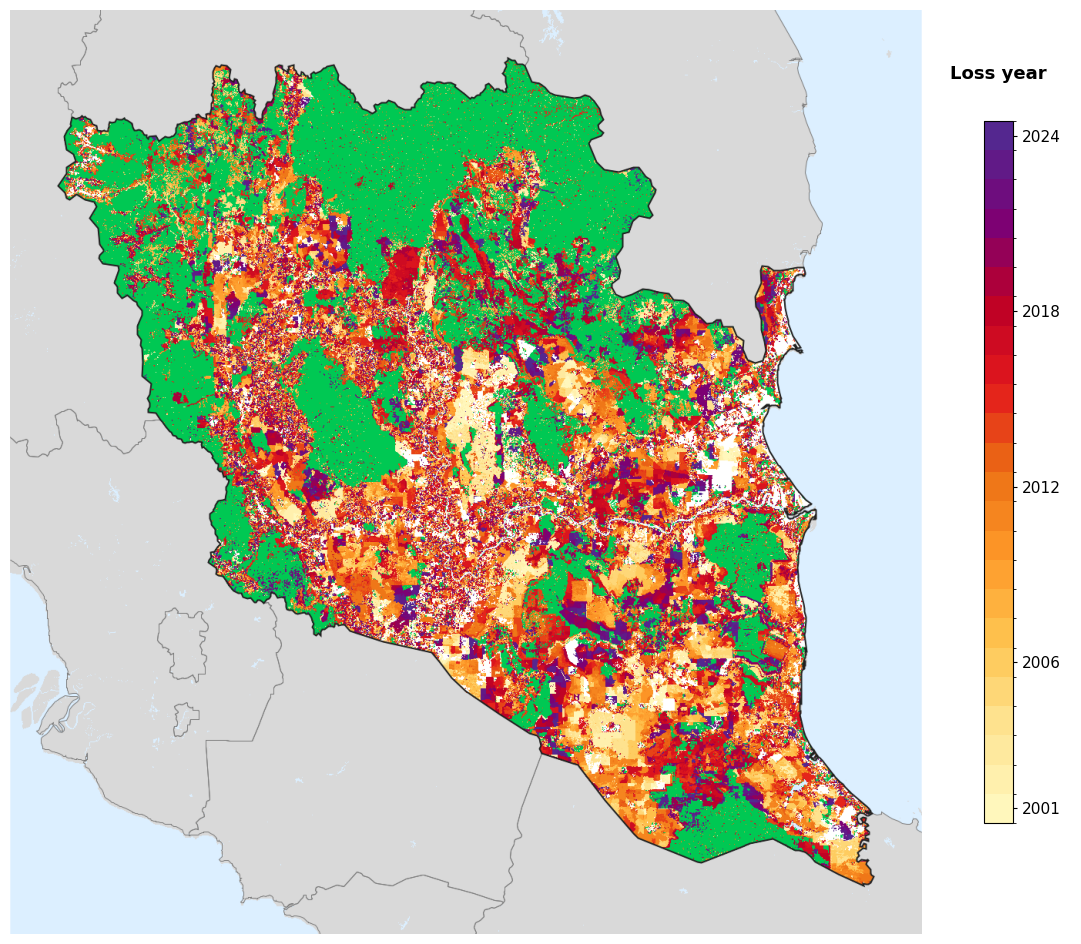
Tree-cover loss year in Pahang, 2001–2024, from the Global Forest Change dataset

Malaysia, as a nation, is considered one of the most biodiverse on earth. Pahang maintains a protected network of managed areas rich in flora, fauna, and natural resources, in spite of deforestation, rapid industrialisation and an ever-growing population. In Pahang, there are some 74 forest reserves, including ten virgin-jungle reserves and 13 different amenity forests, wildlife reserves, national parks and offshore marine parks. There are many examples of nationally and internationally relevant areas, including the Krau Wildlife Reserve, Bera Lake Ramsar Site, Tioman Island Marine Park and Cameron Highlands Wildlife Sanctuary.

Total forest in Pahang covers 2,046,577.95 ha (56.84% of the land area), of which dryland forest forms the vast majority, alongside peat swamp forest and mangroves. Almost the full range of forest types found in Malaysia is represented in Pahang, although some unique environments (such as heath forest or forest on ultrabasic rocks) exist only in fragmented areas. The protected forest within Taman Negara and Krau Wildlife Reserve includes small areas of extreme lowland alluvial plains. Elsewhere, most of the dryland forest in Pahang is on steep slopes, therefore benefiting from both catchment protection and slope protection functions. Virtually every species of bird and mammal found in Peninsular Malaysia has been recorded in Pahang, other than a few confined to the north of the country or the west coast. There are a large number of montane species. Peaks within Taman Negara, Mount Benom, and peaks along the Titiwangsa Range, with different endemic species in each of these montane regions are located in Pahang. The large forest blocks of the west and northeast support nationally important populations of big mammals and other fauna, and act as a unit with Taman Negara.

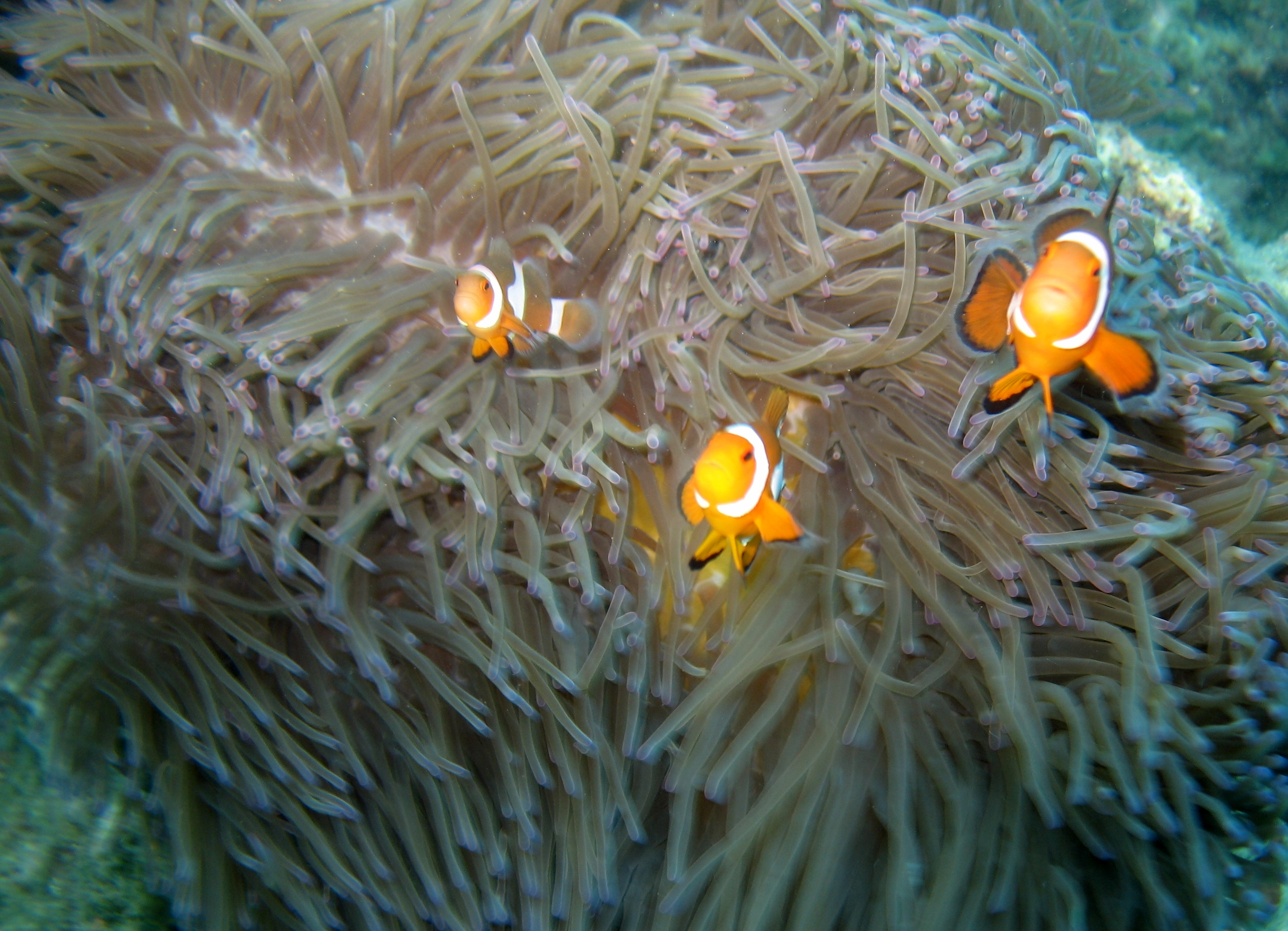
Clownfish at Paya Beach, Tioman Island

The Pahang River is the longest river on the peninsula, and from its headwaters to the estuary it includes virtually all of the natural river types. These range from montane streams, saraca streams and neram rivers to rasau and nipah tidal reaches. Water catchments have been defined as covering 81% of the state and more than half of this is forested. The huge network of rivers in Pahang is home to freshwater aquatic biodiversity, important to the economy of the state. Connecting to this riverine systems are a number of natural freshwater lakes, most notably Bera and Chini lakes. Surrounded by a patchwork of dry lowland dipterocarp forests, the lake environment stretches its tentacles into islands of peat swamp forests. Rich in wildlife and vegetation, the lakes provide an ecosystem which supports not only a diversity of animal and plant life, but sustains the livelihood of the Orang Asal, the aboriginal people inhabiting the wetlands.

Most of the coastline is sandy, with rocky headlands at intervals. Mangroves and nipah swamps are confined to estuaries and do not occur along the exposed coast. These estuaries can be seasonally important to fishermen when rough weather prevents fishing at sea. There are limited areas of hard and soft coral offshore, which have been mapped together with coastal features. There are many islands off the east coast, the largest being Tioman and Seri Buat islands. Besides the island populations of fauna and flora, which sometimes differ genetically from mainland forms of the same species, these islands are of value for the reefs and other bottom features which support marine biological diversity. The reefs in particular are sensitive to sedimentation from activities on land. These features are related to the maintenance of marine fisheries, an important sector of the coastal economy. Tioman, Chebeh, Tulai, Sembilang and Seri Buat islands constitute the Tioman group of islands within the Marine Parks system of Peninsular Malaysia.

== Politics and government ==
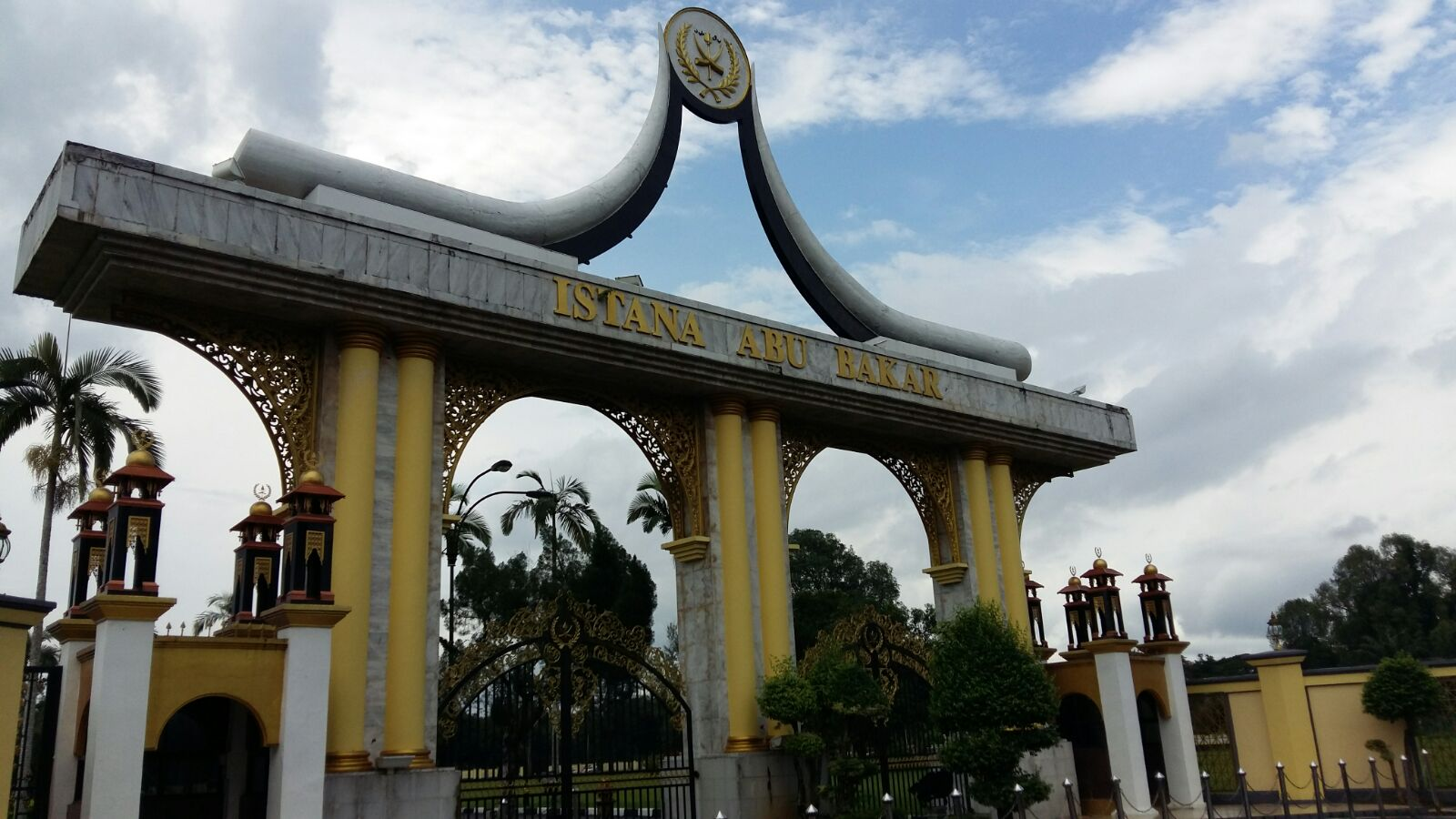
Main entrance of the Royal Palace, Pekan

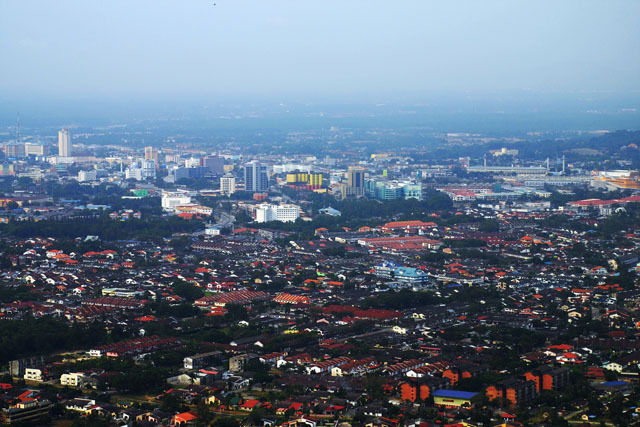
Kuantan, capital of Pahang

Parliamentary constituencies of Pahang

Affiliation	Coalition/Party Leader	Status	Seats	
Affiliation	Coalition/Party Leader	Status	2022 election	Current
Barisan Nasional; Pakatan Harapan	Wan Rosdy Wan Ismail	Government	25	25
Perikatan Nasional	Tuan Ibrahim Tuan Man	Opposition	17	17
Total			42	42
Government majority			8	24

The modern constitution of Pahang, the Undang-Undang Tubuh Kerajaan Pahang, was first drafted on 1 February 1948. It was formally adopted on 25 February 1959. The constitution proclaims that Pahang is a constitutional monarchy. The constitutional head is the Sultan, who is described as "the fountain head of justice and of all authority of government" in the state. He who is vested with the power as a monarch of the state, is also the Head of Islam and the source of all titles and dignities, honours and awards. The current Sultan belong to the male line of the Bendahara dynasty who have been ruling the state since the 17th century. Since 2019, the reigning monarch has been Abdullah. He was proclaimed as Sultan on 15 January 2019, succeeding his father, Ahmad Shah, whose abdication was decided at a Royal Council meeting on 11 January. On 24 January 2019, days after his accession to the throne of Pahang, he was elected as the 16th Yang di-Pertuan Agong of Malaysia, succeeding Muhammad V who abdicated from the throne on 6 January. Succession order to the throne of Pahang is generally determined roughly by agnatic primogeniture. No female may become ruler, and female line descendants are generally excluded from succession. In Pahang traditional political structure, the offices of Orang Besar Berempat ('four major chiefs') are the most important positions after the Sultan himself. The four hereditary territorial magnates are; Orang Kaya Indera Pahlawan, Orang Kaya Indera Perba Jelai, Orang Kaya Indera Segara and Orang Kaya Indera Shahbandar. Next in the hierarchy were the Orang Besar Berlapan ('eight chiefs') and Orang Besar Enam Belas ('sixteen chiefs') who were subordinated to the principal nobles.

The Sultan headed two institutions, the State Legislative Assembly and State Executive Council. The legislative branch of the state is the unicameral Dewan Undangan Negeri ('State Legislative Assembly') whose 42 members are elected from single-member constituencies. The assembly has the power to enact the state laws. State government is led by a Menteri Besar, who is a member of the State Legislative Assembly from the majority party. According to the constitution of Pahang, the Menteri Besar is required to be a Malay and a Muslim, appointed by the ruler from the party that commands the majority of the State Legislative Assembly. By convention, state elections are held concurrently with the federal election, held at least once every five years, the most recent of which took place in May 2018. Registered voters of age 21 and above may vote for the members for the state legislative chamber.

Executive power is vested in the State Executive Council as per 1959 constitution. It consists of the Mentri Besar, who is its chairman, and 13 other members. The Sultan of Pahang appoints the Mentri Besar and the rest of the council from the members of the State Assembly. The Mentri Besar is both the head of the Executive Council and the head of the State Government. The incumbent, Dato' Seri Wan Rosdy Wan Ismail from the United Malays National Organisation, a major component party of the Barisan Nasional (BN) coalition, appointed in 2018, is the 15th Mentri Besar.

As a federal state, Pahang is subjected to Malaysia's legal system which is based on English Common Law. The highest court in the judicial system is the Federal Court, followed by the Court of Appeal and the High Court of Malaya. Malaysia also has a special court to hear cases brought by or against royalty. The death penalty is in use for serious crimes such as murder, terrorism, drug trafficking, and kidnapping. Separate from and running parallel to the civil courts, are the Syariah Court, which apply Sharia law to Muslims in the areas of family law and religious observances. As provided in Article 3 of the Federal Constitution, Syariah or Islamic law is a matter of state law, passed in the State Legislative Assembly. Matters related to the enforcement of the Syariah law falls under the jurisdiction of the Jabatan Agama Islam Pahang ('Pahang Islamic Religious Department'). Pahang's constitution empowers the Sultan as the head of Islam and Malay customs in the state. State council known as Majlis Ugama Islam dan Adat Resam Melayu Pahang ('Council of Islam and Malay Customs of Pahang') is responsible in advising the ruler as well as regulating both Islamic affairs and adat.

=== Subdivisions ===
Pahang is divided into 11 administrative districts, which in turn is divided into 66 mukims. Currently, there are also 4 subdistricts in Pahang, which is Genting, Gebeng, Jelai and Muadzam Shah. For each district, the state government appoints a district officer who heads lands and district office. An administrative district can be distinguished from a local government area where the former deals with land administration and revenue while the latter deals with the planning and delivery of basic infrastructure to its inhabitants. Administrative district boundaries are usually coextensive with local government area boundaries but may sometimes differ especially in urbanised areas. Local governments in Pahang consist of 1 city council, 3 municipal councils, 7 district councils and 1 modified local authority.

The administrative divisions in Pahang are originated from the time of the old Pahang Sultanate, whereby territorial magnates appointed by the Sultan to administer the historical divisions of the state. The largest historical divisions were; Jelai (corresponds to modern day Lipis District), Temerloh, Chenor (corresponds to modern day Maran District) and Pekan, each administered by the four major chiefs (Orang Besar Berempat). Next in the hierarchy were the Orang Besar Berlapan ('eight chiefs') and then Orang Besar Enam Belas ('sixteen chiefs') who were subordinated to their respective principal nobles. The lowest of this traditional hierarchy are the Tok Empat or village headmen who were subordinated to Tok Mukim, who in turn subordinated to Tok Penghulu, who in turn subordinated to one of the sixteen chiefs.

In modern times, the Tok Empat became formally known as Ketua Kampung (literally 'village headman'), although continued to be referred as such informally. He is subordinated to a Penghulu, the head of the mukim, who in turn subordinated to the district officer.

Administrative divisions of Pahang
Number	Districts	Seat	Local government level	Mukim	Area (km^{2})	Population (2025)
1	Bera	Bandar Bera	District Council	Bera, Teriang	2,214.21	101,610
2	Bentong	Bentong	Municipality	Bentong, Sabai, Pelangai; Autonomous sub-districts: Genting Highlands	1,835.26	121,932
3	Cameron Highlands	Tanah Rata	District Council	Hulu Telom, Ringlet, Tanah Rata	671.98	44,769
4	Jerantut	Jerantut	District Council	Bulau, Hulu Cheka, Hulu Tembeling, Kelola, Kuala Tembeling, Pedah, Pulau Tawar, Tebing Tinggi, Teh, Tembeling	7,304.55	100,604
5	Kuantan	Kuantan	City	Kuala Kuantan, Hulu Kuantan, Sungai Karang, Beserah, Hulu Lepar, Penor; Autonomous sub-districts: Gebeng	3,088.59	574,749
6	Lipis	Kuala Lipis	District Council	Batu Yon, Budu, Cheka, Gua, Hulu Jelai, Kechau, Kuala Lipis, Penjom, Tanjung Besar, Telang; Autonomous sub-districts: Jelai	5,405.57	102,817
7	Maran	Maran	District Council	Bukit Segumpal, Chenor, Kertau, Luit	1,879.12	119,819
8	Pekan	Pekan	Municipality	Bebar, Ganchong, Kuala Pahang, Langgar, Lepar, Pahang Tua, Pekan, Penyor, Pulau Manis, Pulau Rusa, Temai	3,605.60	128,773
9	Raub	Raub	District Council	Batu Talam, Dong, Gali, Hulu Dong, Sega, Semantan Hulu, Teras	2,326.29	100,704
10	Rompin	Kuala Rompin	District Council / Modified Local Authority (Tioman Development Authority)	Endau, Keratong, Pontian, Rompin, Tioman, Bebar; Autonomous sub-districts: Bandar Muadzam Shah	5,402.68	103,521
11	Temerloh	Temerloh	Municipality	Bangau, Jenderak, Kerdau, Lebak, Lipat Kajang, Mentakab, Perak, Sanggang, Semantan, Songsang	2,272.10	178,974

== Economy ==
Pahang GDP share by sector (2024)
1. Services (51.7%)
2. Agriculture (22.3%)
3. Manufacturing (21.2%)
4. Construction (3.70%)
5. Mining & Quarrying (0.90%)
6. Others (0.20%)

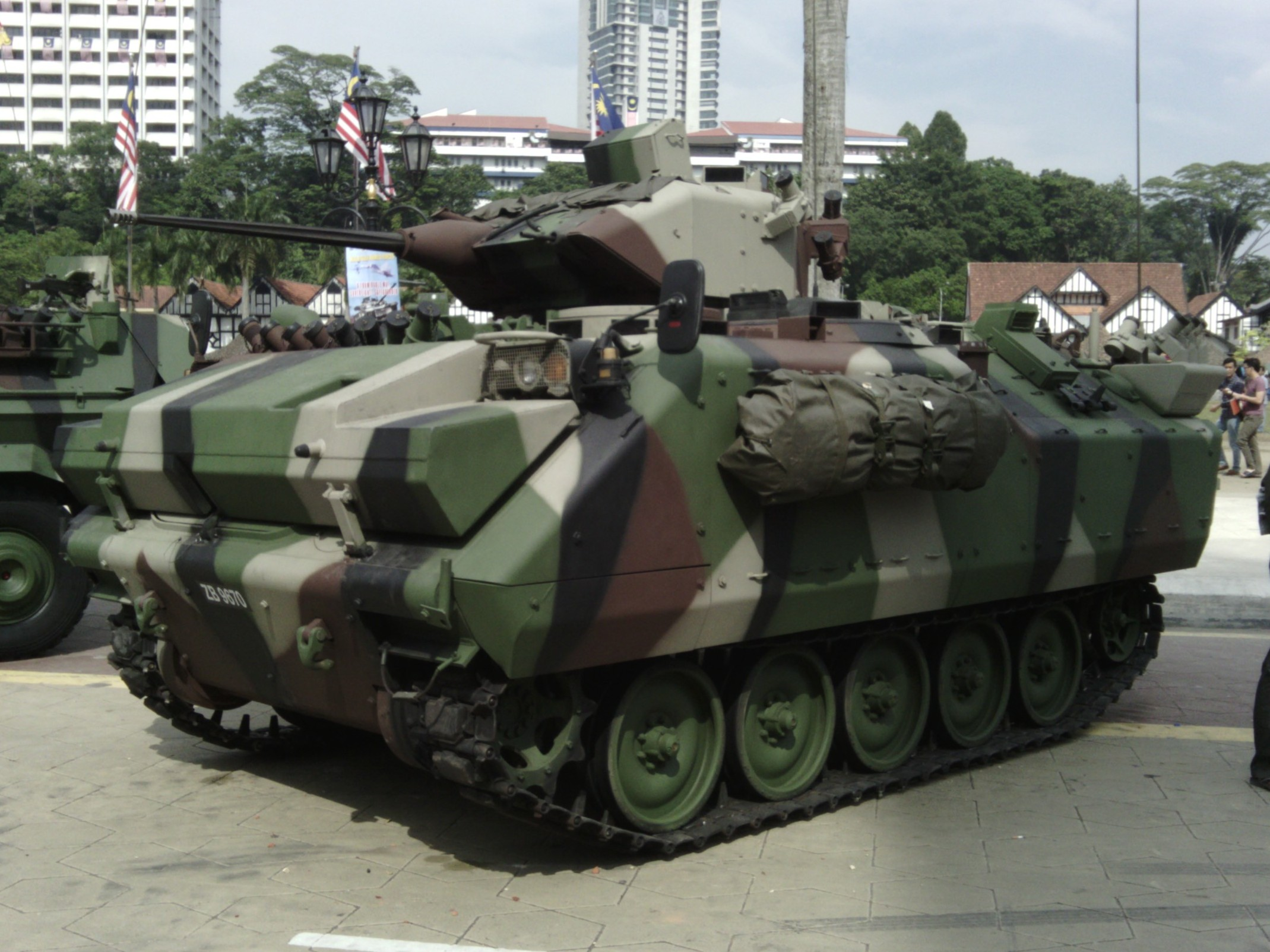
ACV-300 Adnan, produced by Deftech, a subsidiary of DRB-HICOM. The company is the anchor tenant of the Peramu Jaya Industrial Park, Pekan.

As a federal state of Malaysia, Pahang is a relatively open state-oriented market economy. The Pahang State Government Development Corporation, established in 1965, carries the responsibility to drive the economic and social development, by attracting investments, promoting industrial, property and entrepreneurial development, and setting up new commercial hubs and townships. The federal government, through a series development initiatives and programs, the most recent is the East Coast Economic Region introduced in 2007, is also credited for the robust economic growth in recent years. In 2024, Pahang recorded a GDP of RM68.7 billion with a growth rate of 5.7%, ranking as the fifth highest growing state in Malaysia. The nominal GDP per capita reached RM46,084, ranking eighth nationally. The state's economic output is dominated by Services (51.7%), Agriculture (22.3%), and Manufacturing (21.2%).

Historically, by the 19th century, Pahang's economy, like in ancient times, was still heavily dependent on the export of gold. Gold mines can be found from Bera to Jelai River river basin. Systematic mining started in 1889 during British protectorate, when the Raub Australian Gold mine was established. Extensive underground mining took place in the area and this continued until 1985 during which time the mine at Raub produced nearly 1 million ounces, 85% of the production of Peninsular Malaysia. Another important article of export was tin, which was also mined in a large scale. The tin ore production was primarily concentrated at Sungai Lembing, where during its heyday, the operations saw the excavation of deep shaft mines that were among the largest, longest and deepest in the world. The growth of the mining industry had a significant impact on Pahang's society and economy towards the end of the 19th century. Thousands of people were at work in the mines which places had, in consequence, become an important trading centres in the state. Mining and quarrying generated RM744.30 million in revenue in 2024, contributing 0.9% to state GDP. Modern mining industry includes iron ore, gold, bauxite, and non-radioactive rare earth elements (NR-REE), with estimated state reserves of 2,706,250 tonnes.

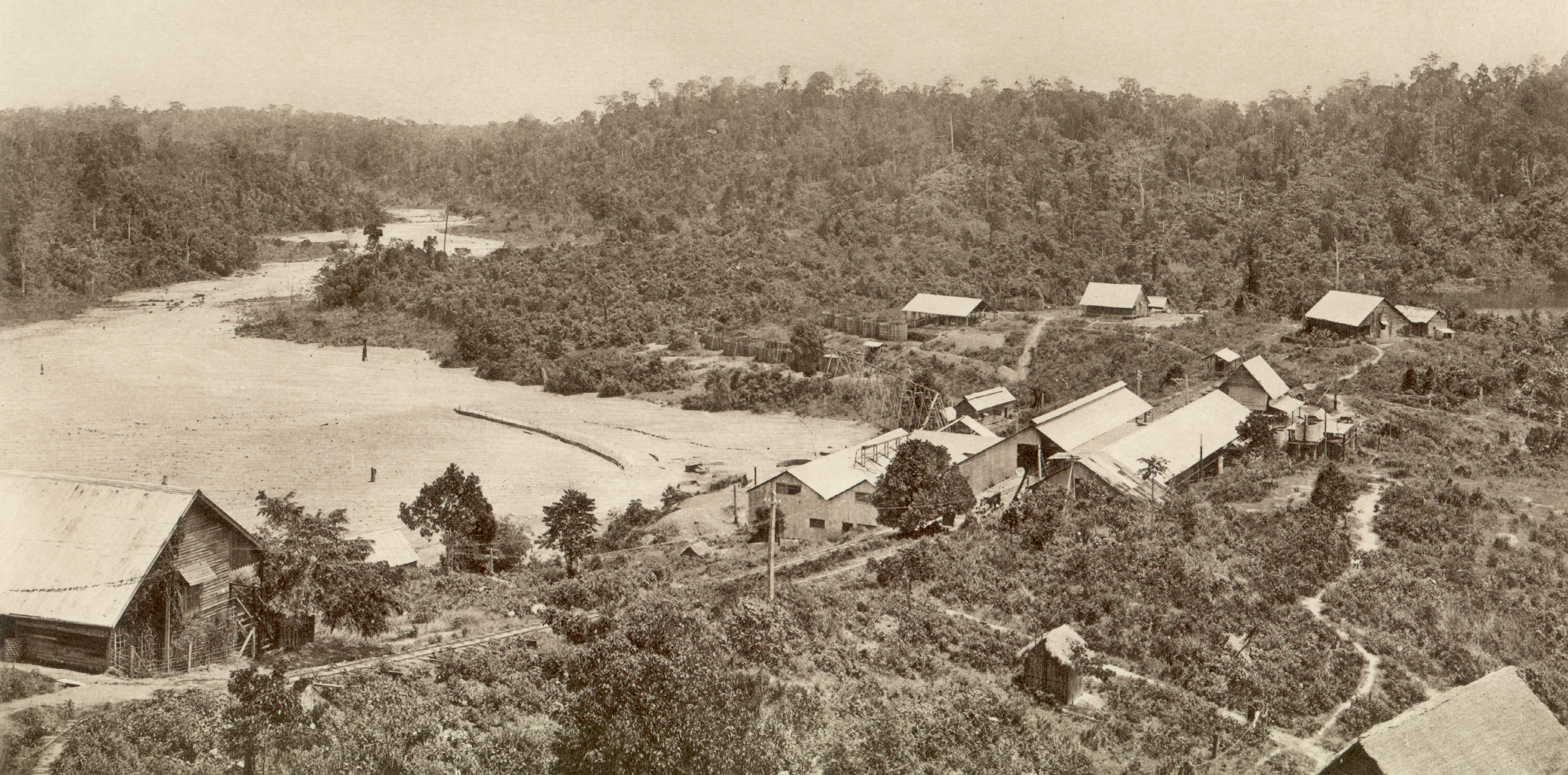
A gold mine in Raub during British Protectorate. Gold was the most important export of Pahang since the ancient times.

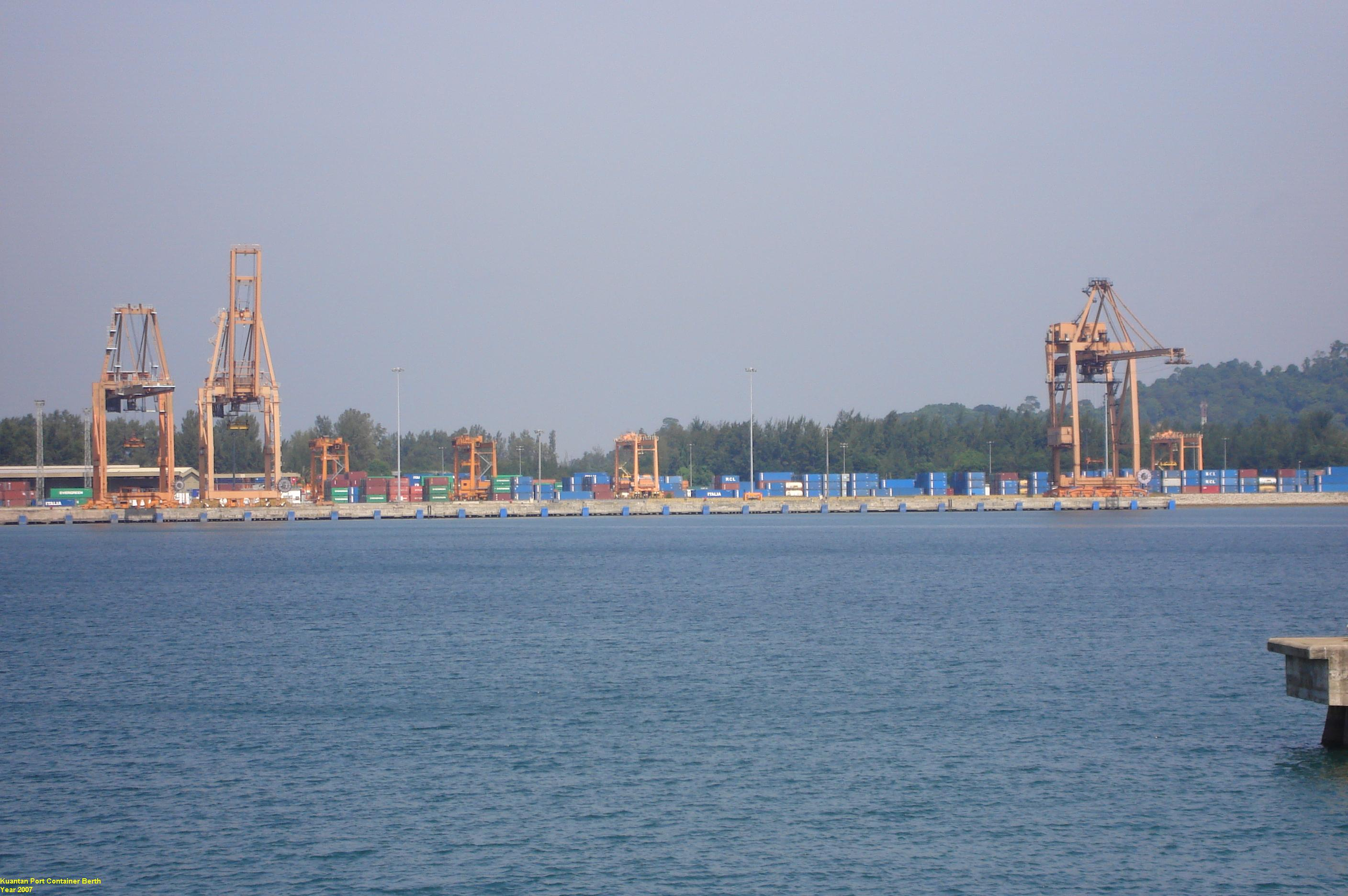
Kuantan Port, the major maritime gateway to the east coast region of Peninsular Malaysia

The services sector forms the largest component of Pahang's economy, driven by wholesale and retail trade, food and beverage services, and accommodation. Tourism serves as a primary economic catalyst within the services sector. In 2024, the state hosted 13.7 million tourists across 13 major destinations, generating RM12.3 billion in tourist expenditure.

The agricultural sector represents the second largest component of the state economy, accounting for 22.3% of GDP. Pahang has 112,852.03 ha of productive food agriculture and holds the largest oil palm cultivation area in Peninsular Malaysia at 721,554.50 ha, producing 13.78 million metric tonnes of fresh fruit bunches annually. It also leads Peninsular Malaysia in rubber plantation area with 18,235.50 ha, producing 14,171.70 metric tonnes annually.

The manufacturing sector constitutes 21.2% of the state's economy, driven by resource-based processing of rubber, wood, palm oil, petrochemicals, and high-tech manufacturing. Industrial development is concentrated around the Gebeng Industrial Estate, Malaysia-China Kuantan Industrial Park (MCKIP), and the Peramu Jaya Industrial Park in Pekan.

Under state and regional frameworks, several High Impact Projects (HIP) have been outlined to accelerate growth. Key projects include the Renewable Interconnected Sustainable Energy (RISE) grid initiative spanning Kuantan, Maran, and Bera, a proposed commercial spaceport for rocket launching in Nenasi, Pekan, the development of Lipis Geopark for eco-tourism, and dedicated Waste-to-Energy (WtE) processing plants in Kuantan and Cameron Highlands.

== Infrastructure ==
Infrastructure in Pahang, like the rest of the east coast region of Peninsular Malaysia, is still relatively underdeveloped compared to the west coast. To reduce the development gap, the federal government, have been investing heavily in high impact development as well as in upgrading the existing infrastructures. Development grant to the state government amounts to $24.82 million in 2017. In federal budget 2017, about $958 million allocation was announced for Malaysian states to improve the public infrastructures. About 46% of the state annual budget are also allocated for the improvement of the state infrastructure. Pahang also financed much of its infrastructure projects under the privatisation concept, through 13 state statutory bodies including Pahang Development Corporation, Pahang State Foundation, Development Authority of Pahang Tenggara, Tioman Development Authority and Fraser's Hill Development Corporation. Under the Tenth Malaysia Plan (2011–2015), $493 million has been allocated for 351 infrastructure projects in the state. While under the Eleventh Malaysia Plan (2016–2020), $547 million has been allocated to Pahang, with infrastructure in the rural areas was given attention with the increase of rural water, electricity supply and road coverage.

Peninsular Malaysia as a whole including Pahang, has almost 100% electrification. Transmission and distribution of electricity in the state of Pahang lie under the responsibility of the national utility company, Tenaga Nasional. The main power plant in Pahang is located in Cameron Highlands with installed capacity 250 MW that generates about 643 GWh of hydroelectricity. Transmission voltages are at 500 kV, 275 kV and 132 kV while distribution voltages are 33 kV, 22 kV, 11 kV and 415 V three-phase or 240 V single-phase. System frequency is 50 Hz 1%. Under its Total Energy Solution, Tenaga Nasional also offers electricity packaged with steam and chilled water for the benefit of certain industries that require multiple forms of energy for their activities.

Access to improved water source in Malaysia is 100%. The water supply in Pahang is managed by the Pahang Water Management Berhad or Pengurusan Air Pahang Berhad (PAIP). The department is also responsible for the planning, development, management of water supply as well as billing and collection of payment. In Pahang, water supply comes mainly from rivers and streams and there are about 79 water treatment plants located in various districts. Pahang abundant water sources are also significant to the growing demand of water supply in Greater Kuala Lumpur and Selangor, the industrial heartland of Malaysia. The federal government initiated Pahang-Selangor Raw Water Transfer Project that includes the construction of the Kelau dam on the Pahang river, as well as the transfer of water via a tunnel through the Titiwangsa Mountains.

=== Internet and telecommunication ===
5G network coverage reached 66.4% of populated areas in Pahang in 2025, alongside a fixed-line broadband premises penetration rate of 28.7%. Digital infrastructure expansion efforts continue to focus on reducing connectivity gaps between urban and rural areas, supported by national initiatives and local distribution networks.

The mobile telecommunication penetration, although increasingly popular, was lower compared to the national figure per 100 inhabitants, 130.9 against national figure 143.8. Cellular coverage expansion in Pahang is served by 207 communication towers, with 3G mobile broadband coverage has been expanded to 150 sites and LTE mobile broadband to 42 sites respectively. To accommodate the demand for high-speed mobile broadband, the core network capacity has been upgraded, with fibre-optic network has been expanded in 2015 to a total 45.6 km. In 2015, an initiative was announced by the federal government to connect the Peninsular and the East Malaysia states, Sabah and Sarawak with submarine fibre optic cable network bringing 4 terabits per second capacity with a total distance of approximately 3,800 kilometres. The planned submarine cable will connect the state of Pahang and Sabah through connecting points in Cherating and Kota Kinabalu respectively.

=== Transportation ===
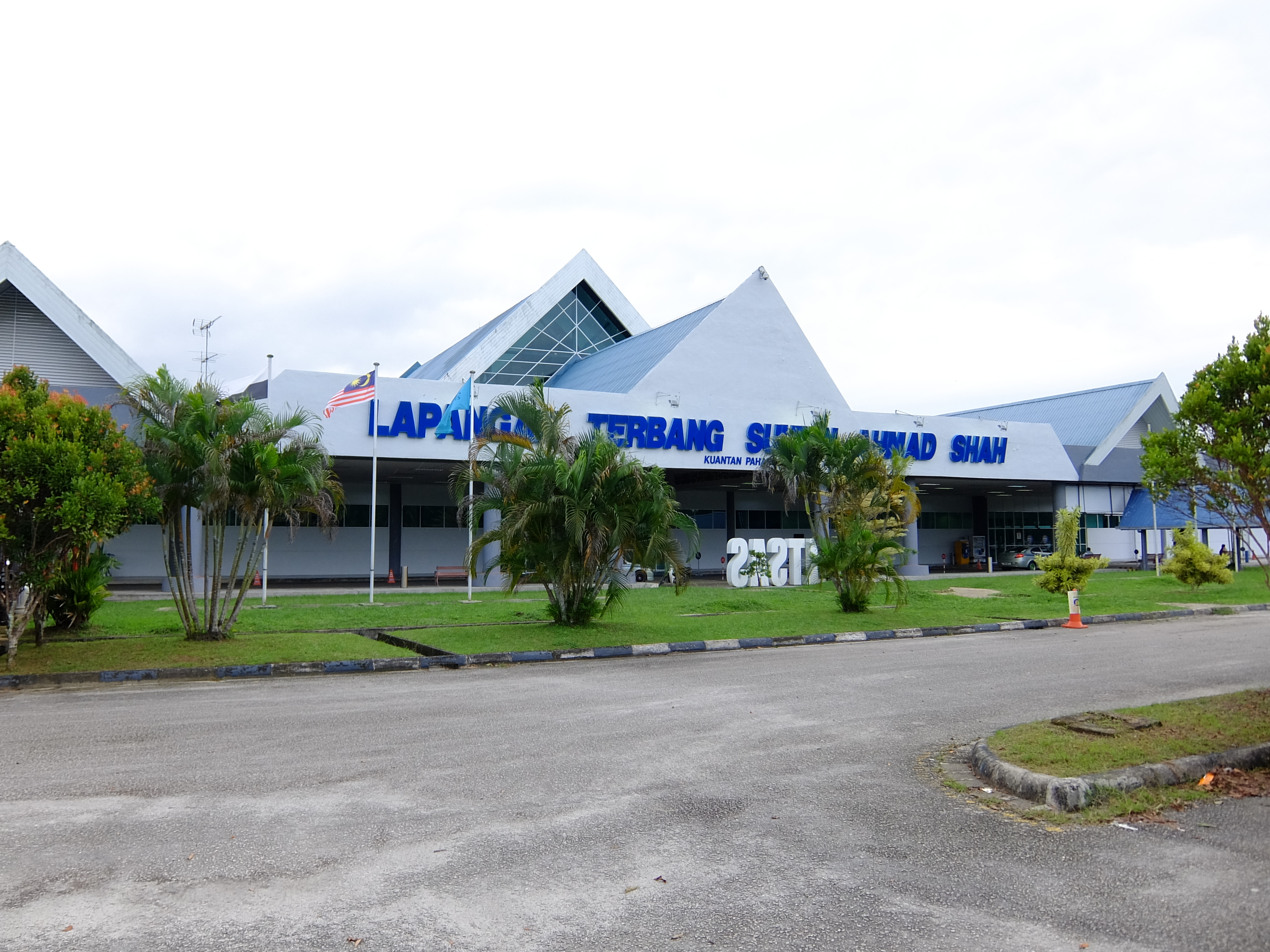
Sultan Haji Ahmad Shah Airport

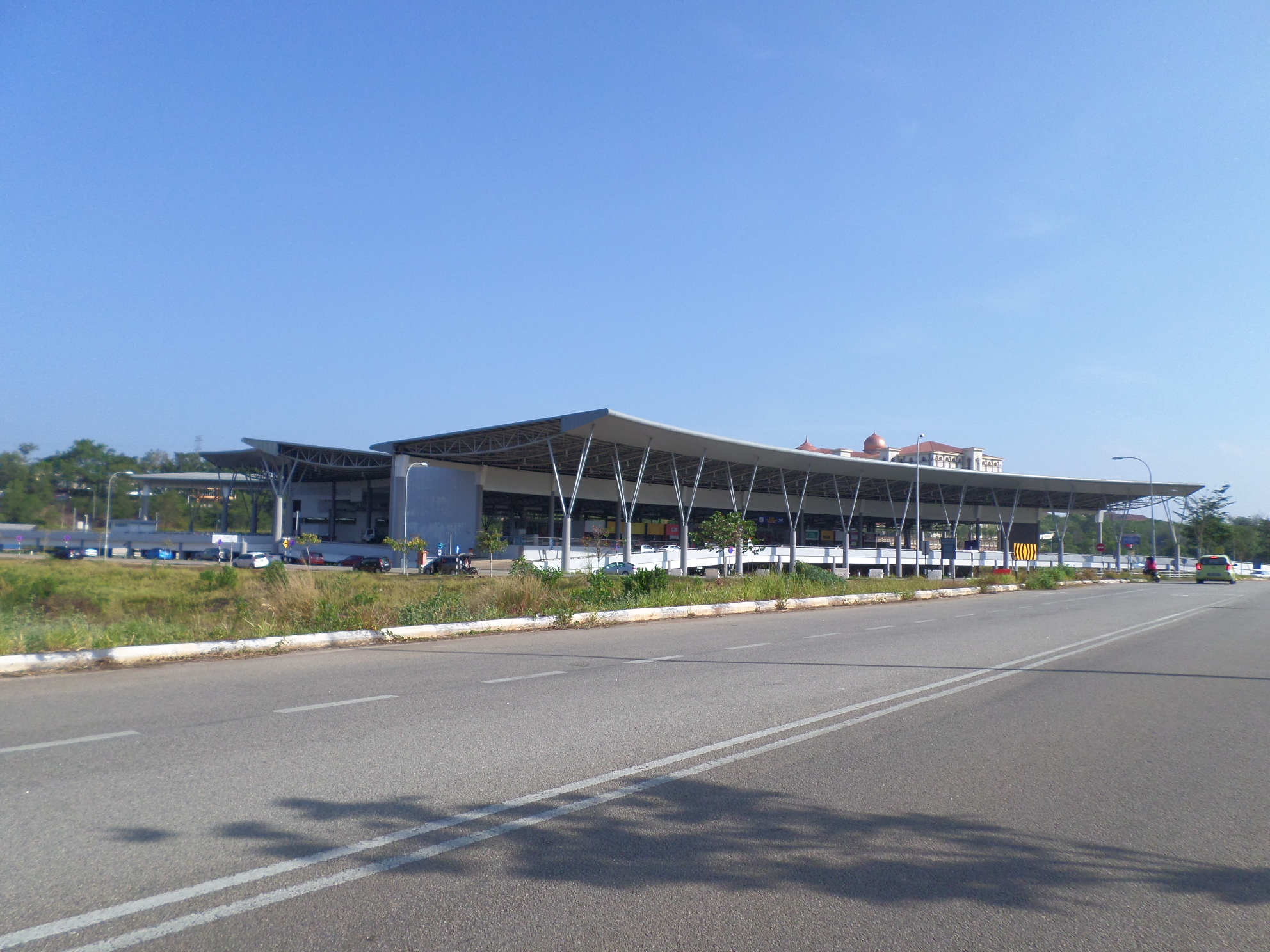
Kuantan Sentral Terminal

Much like many former British protectorates, Pahang uses a dual carriageway with the left-hand traffic rule. As of 2013, Pahang had a total of 19,132 kilometres (11,888 mi) of connected roadways, with 12,425 kilometres (7,721 mi) being paved state routes, 702 kilometres (436 mi) of dirt tracks, 2,173 kilometres (1,350 mi) of gravel roads, and 3,832.6 kilometres (2,381.5 mi) of paved federal road. The primary route in Pahang is the East Coast Expressway, which is the extension of Kuala Lumpur–Karak Expressway, that connects the east coast and the west coast of the Peninsular Malaysia. The expressway passes through 3 states of the peninsular; Pahang, Terengganu and Selangor, connects Kuantan Port to the national grid and links many important town and cities of the east coast to the industrial heartland of Malaysia in the west. Another important route, the Central Spine Road (Lingkaran Tengah Utama), serves as a major north-south inland highway connecting Kelantan, Pahang, and the Klang Valley. Long-term proposed highway developments in Pahang include the Pahang–Selangor Express Highway (LEBARAN) route linking Bagan Datuk, Raub, and Kuantan, the PETEX highway connecting Pedas, Seremban, Simpang Pelangai, and Temerloh, and the proposed East Coast Expressway Phase 4 (LPT4) extending from Kuantan to Ulu Tiram, Johor.

The traditional rail transit line in Pahang is the KTM East Coast Railway Line, running through the state's interior between Gemas and Tumpat with 8 operational stations in Pahang. The network is augmented by the MRL East Coast Rail Link (ECRL), featuring 7 stations within Pahang (including Kuantan Port City, KotaSAS, Temerloh, and Bentong) that link Port Klang to Kota Bharu, functioning as a land bridge for regional freight and passenger transit.

The Special Economic Zone centered at Kuantan, is the main transportation hub for bus services, air routes and sea routes for the entire east coast region. Terminal Kuantan Sentral serves as the land transportation hub, offering intrastate services that connects all districts of Pahang, as well as interstate services that links the state to the rest of the Peninsular, including Singapore and Thailand. Stage bus services in Kuantan operate under the BAS.MY Kuantan network operated by Sanwa. The primary airport in Pahang is Sultan Ahmad Shah Airport, located 15 km from Kuantan, with proposed future international airports under planning for Tioman and Cherating. Kuantan Port serves as the state's major deep-water maritime gateway to the South China Sea, handling bulk cargo, containers, and industrial shipping for Gebeng and the surrounding industrial parks.

=== Healthcare ===
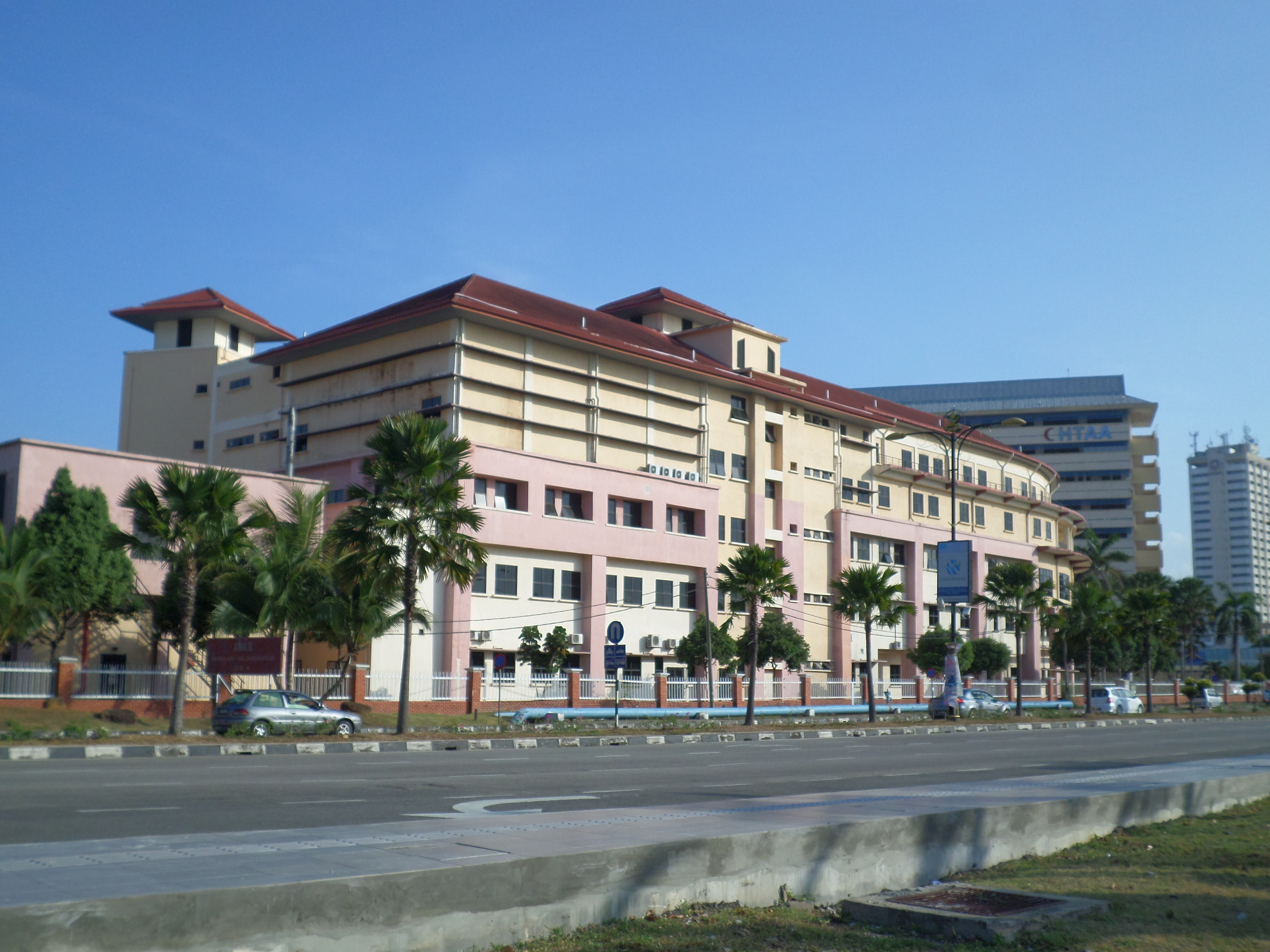
The Tengku Ampuan Afzan Hospital in Kuantan

Pahang population has benefited from a well- developed Malaysian health care system, good access to clean water and sanitation, and strong social and economic programmes. Health care services consist of tax-funded and federal government-run primary health care centres and hospitals, and fast-growing private services mainly located in physician clinics and hospitals in urban areas. Infant mortality rate per 1000 live births, a standard in determining the overall efficiency of healthcare, in 2010 was 7.6. As of national figure, infant mortality fell from 75 per 1000 live births in 1957 to 7 in 2013. Life expectancy at birth in 2016 was 70.8 years for male and 76.3 years for female.

The public healthcare system in Pahang is provided by five specialist government hospitals; Tengku Ampuan Afzan Hospital, Sultan Haji Ahmad Shah Hospital, Bentong Hospital, Kuala Lipis Hospital and Pekan Hospital, as well as other district hospitals, public health clinics, 1Malaysia clinics, and rural clinics. There are several private hospitals in Pahang, including Kuantan Medical Centre, KPJ Pahang Specialist Hospital, Darul Makmur Medical Centre, PRKMUIP Specialist Hospital and KCDC Hospital. The IIUM Medical Centre located in Bandar Indera Mahkota, is a government-funded teaching hospital managed by Kulliyyah of Medicine, International Islamic University Malaysia. For outpatient treatment, general practitioners are available at private-owned clinics which are easily accessible in most housing estates. The availability of affordable advanced medical services had benefited the state directly from the booming Malaysian medical tourism.

Public health system is financed mainly through general revenue and taxation collected by the federal government, while the private sector is funded principally through out-of-pocket payments from patients and some private health insurance. There is still, however, a significant shortage in the medical workforce, especially of highly trained specialists; thus, certain medical care and treatment are available only in large towns. Recent efforts to bring many facilities to other towns have been hampered by lack of expertise to run the available equipment. As a result, secondary care is offered in smaller public medical facilities in suburbs and rural areas, while more complex tertiary care is available in regional and national hospitals in urban areas like Temerloh and Kuantan.

=== Education ===
Education in Pahang is overseen by two federal ministries, the Ministry of Education responsible for primary and secondary education, and Ministry of Higher Education that is responsible for universities, polytechnic and community colleges. Although public education is the responsibility of the Federal Government, Pahang has an Education Department to co-ordinate educational matters in its territory. The main legislation governing education is the Education Act 1996. The education system features a non-compulsory kindergarten education followed by six years of compulsory primary education, and five years of optional secondary education. Schools in the primary education system are divided into two categories: national primary schools, which teach in Malay, and vernacular schools, which teach in Chinese or Tamil. Secondary education is conducted for five years. In the final year of secondary education, students sit for the Malaysian Certificate of Education examination. Since the introduction of the matriculation programme in 1999, students who completed the 12-month programme in matriculation colleges can enroll in local universities. By Malaysian law, primary education is compulsory. Early childhood education is not directly controlled by the Ministry of Education as it does with primary and secondary education. However, the ministry does oversee the licensing of private kindergartens, the main form of early childhood education, in accordance with the National Pre-School Quality Standard, which was launched in 2013.

Around the time of independence in 1957, overall adult literacy of Malaya in general was quite low at 51%. By the year 2000, adult literacy had increased significantly in Pahang to 92.5% and further increased to 95% ten years later in 2010 census. From these figures, urban literacy was recorded at 95% in 2000 and increased to 97.5 in 2010, while rural literacy was recorded at 90% in 2000 and increased to about 93.5% in 2010.

As of 2017, there are 736 schools in Pahang, which 540 are primary and 196 are secondary schools. Included in this figure are 8 technical/vocational schools and 18 state religious secondary schools managed by Pahang Islamic Religious Department. In addition to federal and state government-funded schools, there are a number of international private schools in Pahang. Garden International School, International School of Kuantan, and International Islamic School Malaysia are the three main international schools serving primary and secondary levels. Another notable international school is Highlands International Boarding School located in Genting Highlands that caters secondary education.

Tertiary education in the state offers certificate, diploma, first degree and higher degree qualifications. The higher learning institutions consist of two major groups, public and private institutions. Public institutions includes universities, polytechnics, community colleges and teacher training institutes. While the private institutions includes private universities, university colleges, foreign branch campus universities and private colleges. Among notable public universities are Universiti Malaysia Pahang, International Islamic University Malaysia Kuantan Campus, one state campus of Universiti Teknologi MARA in Jengka, and two satellite campuses in Kuantan and Raub. Pahang is also home to private universities like DRB-Hicom University of Automotive Malaysia and Universiti Tenaga Nasional Sultan Haji Ahmad Shah Campus.

== Demography ==
Historical population
Year	Pop.	±%
1970	504,945	—
1980	768,801	+52.3%
1991	1,045,003	+35.9%
2000	1,229,104	+17.6%
2010	1,440,741	+17.2%
2020	1,591,295	+10.4%
2025	1,678,272	+5.5%

Pahang's population stood at 1,678,272 in 2025, accounting for 4.9% of Malaysia's overall population. The population density is recorded at 47 people per km^{2}, making it one of the lowest in Peninsular Malaysia. In terms of age structure, the 15–64 working-age population comprises 69.70% of the total, followed by children aged 0–14 (23.20%) and senior citizens aged 65 and above (7.10%).

Malaysian citizens constitute 93.9% of the state's population (1,575,897 individuals), while non-citizens make up 6.1% (102,375 individuals). Among Malaysian citizens, Bumiputeras total 1,292,269 people (including 1,194,929 Malays and 97,340 other indigenous groups such as the Orang Asli), followed by 218,175 Chinese, 55,383 Indians, and 10,070 belonging to other ethnicities.

The population distribution is concentrated in urban areas, with Kuantan District recording the highest population at 574,749, followed by Temerloh (178,974) and Pekan (128,773). Cameron Highlands records the lowest district population at 44,769.

=== Ethnicity ===
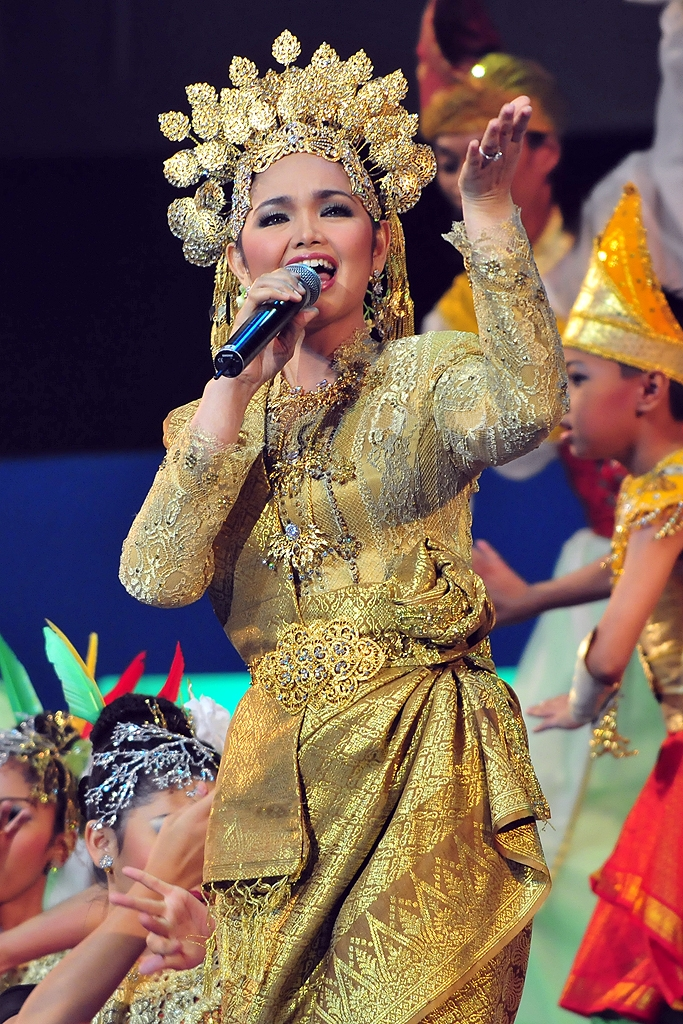
Siti Nurhaliza, a popular singer from Pahang, performing in traditional Malay dress. Malays are the dominant ethnicity in Pahang.

As a multiracial country, Malaysia is home to many ethnic groups. In 2016, it is ranked 59th most ethnically diverse countries in the world with index at 0.596. However, ethnic diversity is not equally distributed among its states and territories. Pahang is categorised as medium ethnically diverse state with 0.36 of ethnic diversity index in 2010. It is ranked 5th least diverse among Malaysian states and territories, after Terengganu, Kelantan, Malacca and Perlis. The least ethnically diverse districts are Pekan, Rompin and Temerloh (index between 0.1 and 0.39), and the most ethnically diverse districts are Bentong and Raub (index between 0.49 and 0.59) where minorities form significant proportion of the population. Ethnic diversity in Pahang was historically high, at an index between 0.5 and 0.6 in the 1970s, but showing a downward trend decades later, largely caused by outward migration, high birth rate of the majority population and the opening up of new agricultural lands particularly the FELDA settlements, that attract many immigrants from other Malaysian states.

The most dominant ethnic group are Malays who, along with other indigenous groups, form the Bumiputera majority. The Malays in turn, can be further divided into several sub-ethnic groups, of which the most dominant are the Pahang Malays. Historically, the community can be found in the vast riverine systems of Pahang and are prominently featured in the state's history. There are also small Pahang Malay communities in the valley of the Lebir River in Kelantan and the upper portions of several rivers near the Perak and Selangor boundaries, descendants of fugitives from the civil war that ravaged their homeland in the 19th century. The Terengganuan Malays, another east coast sub-ethnicity, are native to narrow strip of sometimes discontiguous fishermen villages and towns along the coastline of Pahang. Other important Malay sub-ethnicities include the Kelantanese and Kedahans, that migrated from Kelantan and Kedah respectively, and can be found in major urban centres and agricultural settlements.

The Malays are collectively referred as bumiputera along with other non-Malay indigenous people that constitutes about 5.8% of the state's total population. The community of Orang Asli form the most dominant non-Malay indigenous group. According to 2010 census, Pahang has the largest Orang Asli population in Malaysia with 64,000 people, followed by Perak with 42,841 people. The Orang Asli in Pahang is grouped into 3 large groups; Negrito, Senoi and Proto Malay. Approximately 40% of them live close to or within forested areas, and engage in swiddening as well as hunting and gathering of forest products. Some also practise permanent agriculture and manage their own rubber, oil palm, or cocoa farms. A very small number, especially among the Negrito groups, are still semi-nomadic and depend on the seasonal bounties of the forest. Due to sweeping modernisation, a fair number of them are to be found in urban areas surviving on their waged or salaried jobs. The three groups of Orang Asli can be divided further into several smaller tribes that traditionally domiciled in certain geographical part of Pahang. The Bateq tribe of Negrito group can be found in northern part of Pahang. Two Senoi tribes, Semaq Beri and Semai are also domiciled in northern Pahang. Two other Senoi tribes, Chewong and Jah Hut communities can be found in central Pahang. Meanwhile, the southern part of the state is dominated by Proto Malay tribes of Jakun, Temoq, Semelai and Temuan.

The minorities consist of Chinese (13.0%) and Indians (3.3%). They are descendants of immigrants from China and India that came in large numbers during British protectorate to work in the mines, rubber plantations and various services sector. They are primarily concentrated in the western districts of Raub and Bentong and other urban areas.

Ethnic Group	Population			
Ethnic Group	2010		2025	
Malay	1,052,774	70.15%	1,194,929	71.20%
Other Bumiputras	73,413	4.89%	97,340	5.80%
Bumiputra total	1,126,187	75.04%	1,292,269	77.00%
Chinese	230,798	15.38%	218,175	13.00%
Indian	63,065	4.20%	55,383	3.30%
Others	6,159	0.41%	10,070	0.60%
Malaysian total	1,426,209	95.03%	1,575,897	93.90%
Non-Malaysian	74,608	4.97%	102,375	6.10%
Total	1,500,817	100.00%	1,678,272	100.00%

=== Religion ===
Religion in Pahang (2010)
Religion	Percent
Islam	74.9%
Buddhism	14.4%
Hinduism	4.0%
No religion	2.7%
Christianity	1.9%
Others	0.9%
Unknown / None	0.7%
Chinese folk religion	0.5%

The constitution of Pahang established Islam as a state religion, but grants freedom to manifest other religions in its territory. In the areas of family law and religious observances, the Sharia law are applied to the Muslims and came under the jurisdiction of the Sharia court. The jurisdiction of Syariah courts is limited to Muslims in matters such as marriage, inheritance, divorce, apostasy, religious conversion, and custody among others. No other criminal or civil offences are under the jurisdiction of the Shariah courts, which have a similar hierarchy to the Civil Courts. Despite being the supreme courts of the land, the Civil Courts do not hear matters related to Islamic practices. Matters related to the enforcement of the Syariah law falls under the jurisdiction of the Jabatan Agama Islam Pahang ('Pahang Islamic Religious Department'). Pahang's constitution empowers the Sultan as the head of Islam and Malay customs in the state. State council known as Majlis Ugama Islam dan Adat Resam Melayu Pahang ('Council of Islam and Malay Customs of Pahang') is responsible in advising the ruler as well as regulating both Islamic affairs and adat. Sunni Islam of Shafi'i school of jurisprudence is the dominant branch of Islam, and became the basis of Sharia court rulings and Sharia law passed in the Pahang State Legislative Assembly.

According to the Population and Housing Census 2010 figures, ethnicity and religious beliefs correlate highly. Approximately 74.9% of the population practice Islam, 14.4% practice Buddhism, 4% Hinduism, 2.7% non-religious, 1.9% Christianity.

The Malaysian constitution defines a "Malay", as someone who is a Muslim, speaks Malay regularly, practises Malay customs, and lives in or have ancestors from Malaysia and Singapore. All Malays are therefore necessarily Muslim. Statistics from the 2010 Census indicate that 89.4% of the Chinese population identify as Buddhists, with significant minorities of adherents identifying as Christians (6.7%), Chinese folk religions (2.8%) and Muslims (0.4%). The majority of the Indian population identify as Hindus (90.3%), with a significant minorities of numbers identifying as Muslims (3.6%), Christians (2.5%) and Buddhists (2.3%). The non-Malay bumiputera community are predominantly Atheists (51.9%), with significant minorities identifying as Muslims (11.8%) and Christians (11.7%).

Religious sites in Pahang

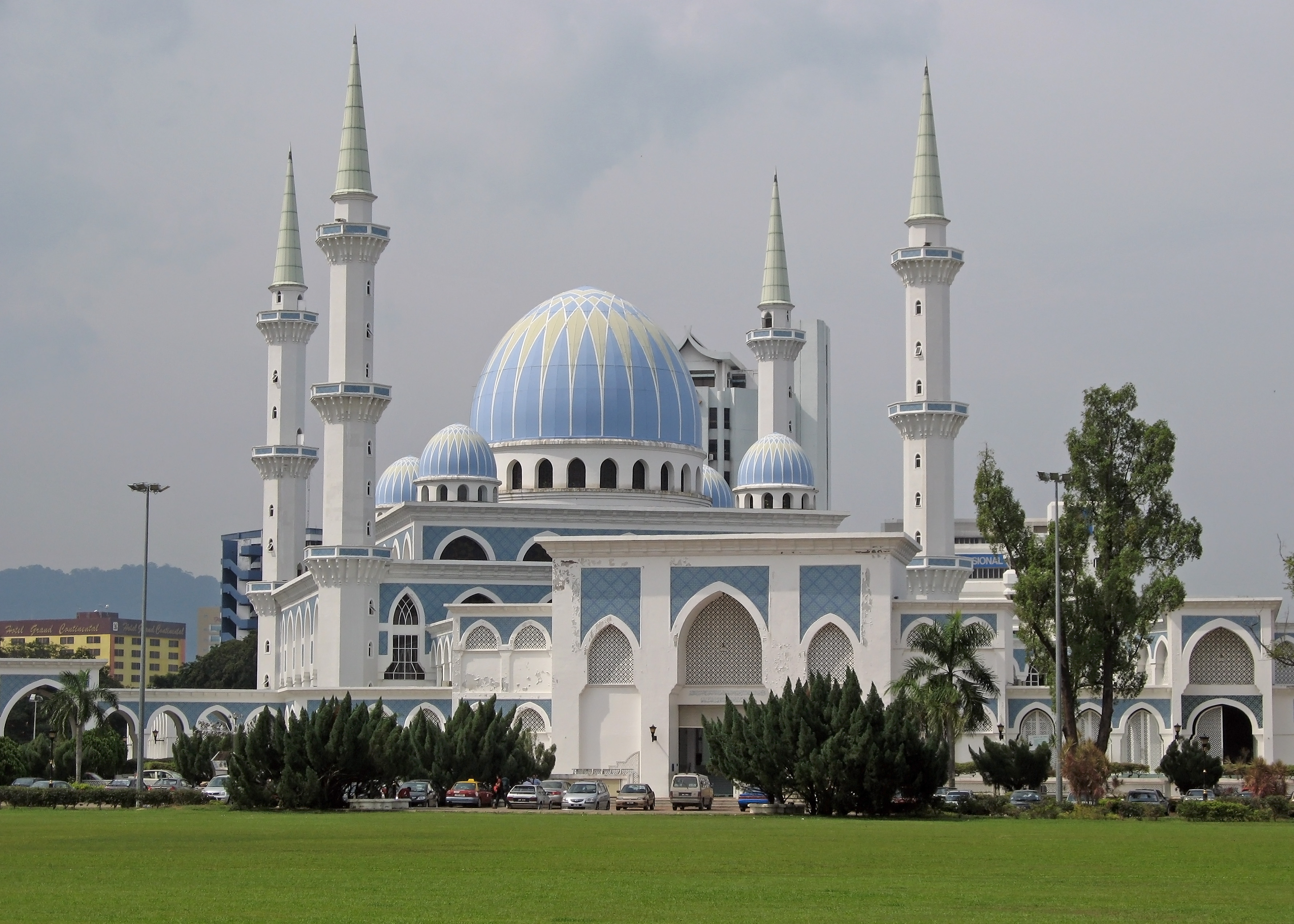
Sultan Ahmad Shah State Mosque

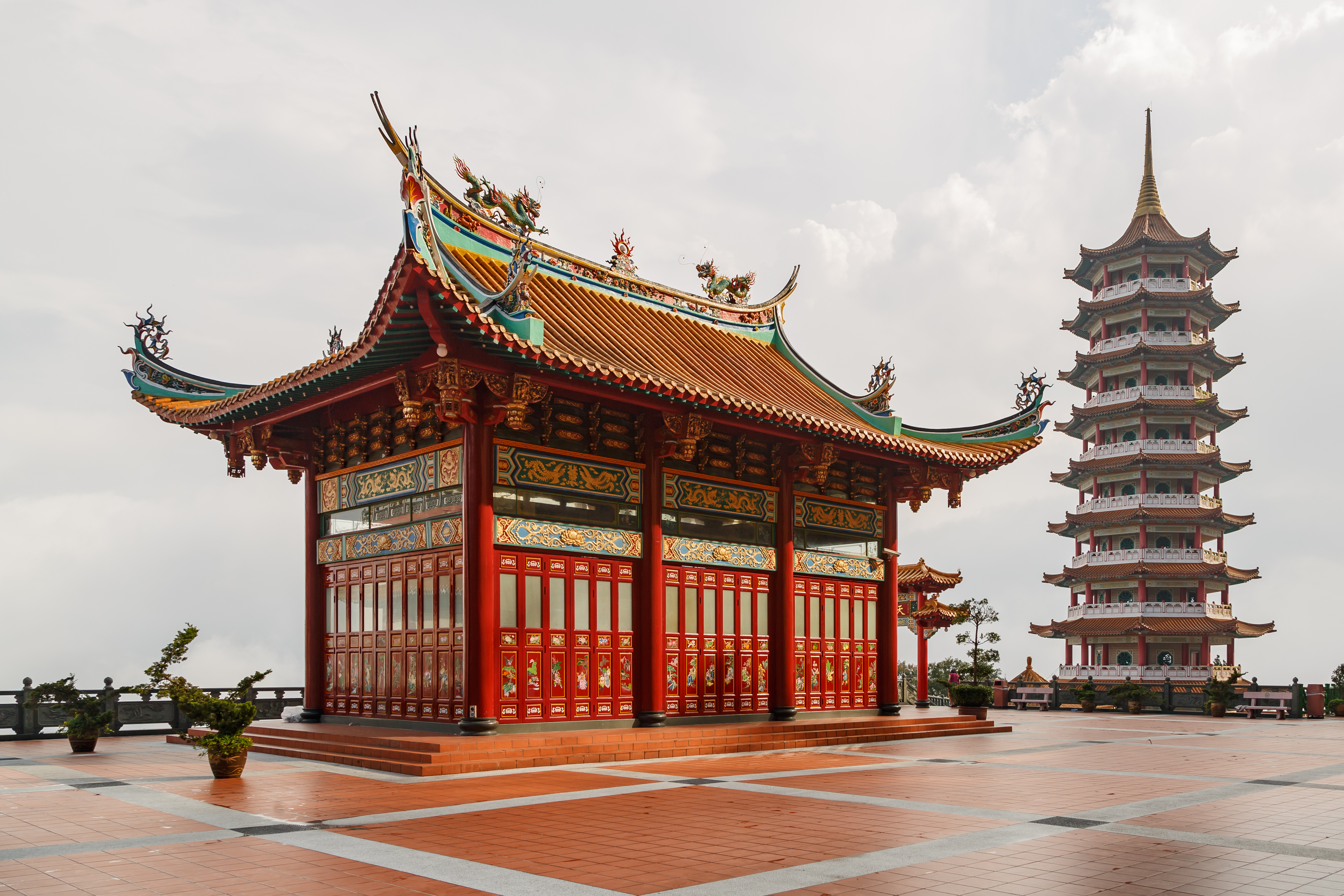
Chin Swee Caves Temple

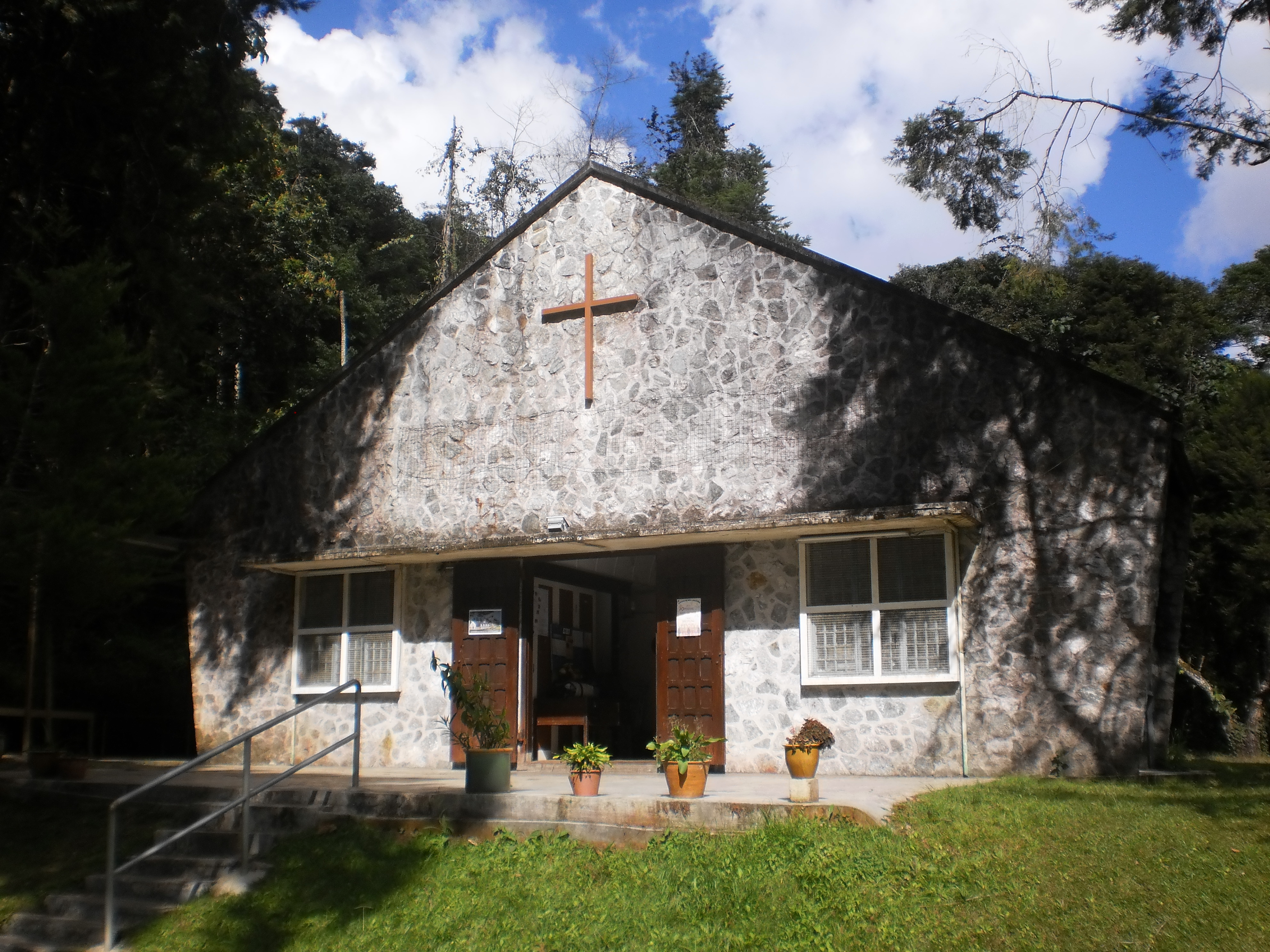
All Souls' Church

=== Languages ===
The official and state language of Pahang is Malaysian, a standardised form of the Malay language. The terminology as per federal government policy is Bahasa Malaysia (literally "Malaysian language") but in the federal constitution continues to refer to the official language as Bahasa Melayu (literally "Malay language"). The National Language Act 1967 specifies the Latin (Rumi) script as the official script of the national language, but allow the use of the traditional Jawi script. Jawi is still used in the official documents of state Islamic religious department and council, on road and building signs, and also taught in primary and religious schools. In 2018, the then Regent of Pahang in a royal decree, expressed his wish for a wider use of Jawi on road signs, business premises, office signs, government agencies and all state education offices in the state. Among the earliest response to the royal decree was by Kuantan Municipal Council that announced enforcement by 2019. English remains an active second language, with its use allowed for some official purposes under the National Language Act of 1967.

The Malay language spoken in Pahang can be further divided into several varieties of Malay dialects. Pahang Malay is the most dominant Malay dialect spoken along the vast riverine systems of Pahang, but it co-exists with other Malay dialects traditionally spoken in the state. Along the coastline of Pahang, Terengganu Malay is spoken in a narrow strip of sometimes discontiguous fishermen villages and towns. Another dialect spoken in Tioman Island is a distinct Malay variant and most closely related to Riau Archipelago Malay subdialect spoken in Natuna and Anambas islands in the South China Sea, together forming a dialect continuum between the Bornean Malay with the Mainland Peninsular/Sumatran Malay. Kelantanese and Kedahan, along with other Malay dialects are also spoken by immigrants from other Malaysian states.

Pahang is also home to majority of Orang Asli languages, mostly belong to Aslian branch of Austroasiatic such as Semai, Batek, Semoq Beri, Jah Hut, Temoq, Che Wong, Semelai (although recognised as "Proto-Malay"), Temiar and Mendriq. Besides Austroasiatic, Proto-Malay languages that is a branch of Austronesian are also spoken, mostly Temuan and Jakun.

Malaysian Chinese predominantly speak Chinese dialects from the southern provinces of China. The more common Chinese varieties in the country are Mandarin, Hokkien, Hakka, Cantonese, Hainanese and Fuzhou.

Tamil is used predominantly by Tamils, who form a majority of Malaysian Indians.

== Culture ==
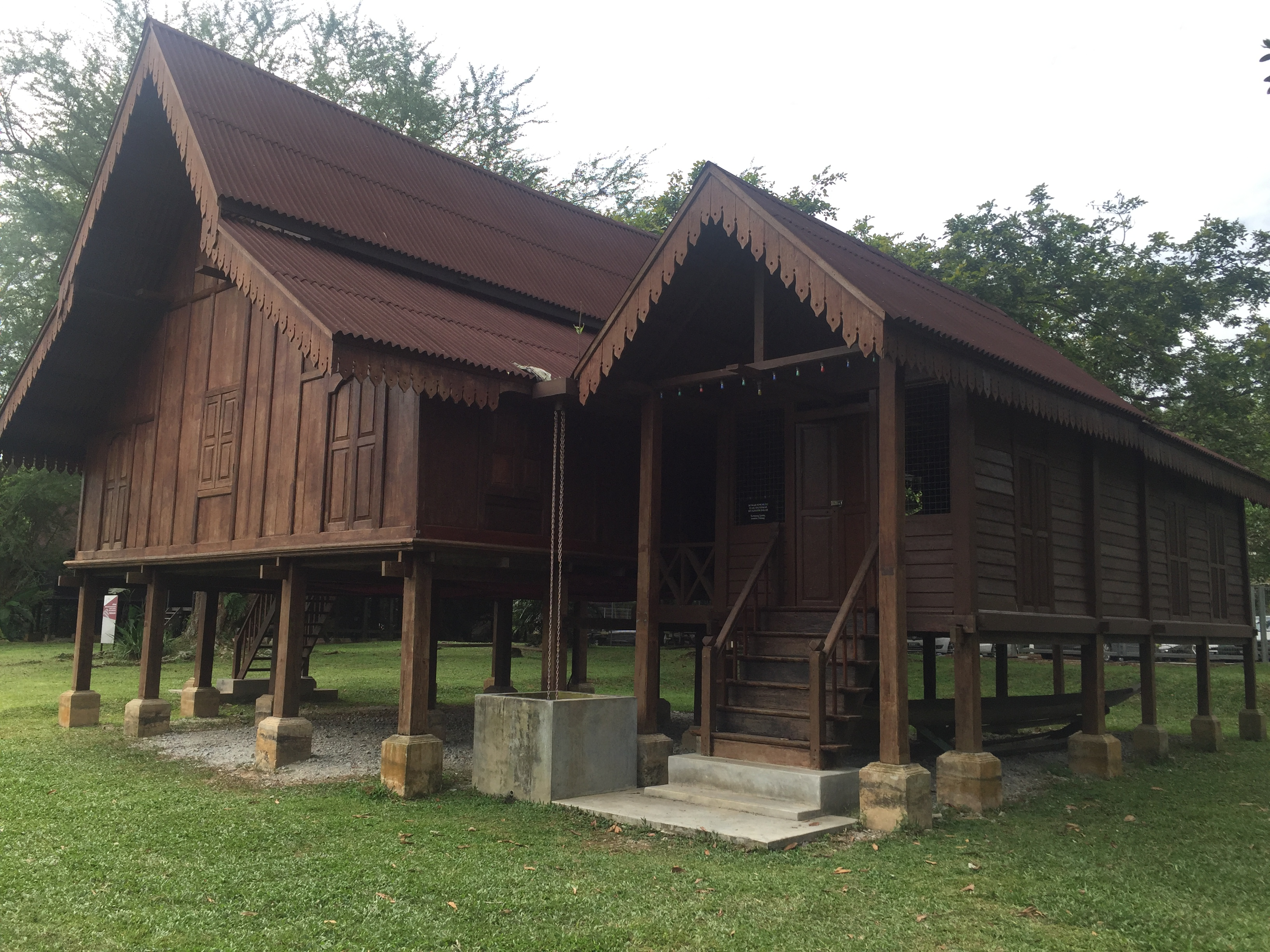
The traditional Serambi house of Pahang

As a less ethnically diverse state, the traditional culture of Pahang is largely predominated by the indigenous culture, of both Malays and Orang Asli. Both cultures trace their origin from the early settlers in the state that consist primarily from both various Malayic speaking Austronesians and Mon-Khmer speaking Austroasiatic tribes. Around the opening of the common era, Mahayana Buddhism was introduced to the region, where it flourished with the establishment of a Buddhist state from the 5th century. Malayic cultures flourished during Srivijayan era, and Malayisation intensified after Pahang was established as a Malay-Muslim Sultanate in 1470. The development of many Malay-dominated centres in the state, drew some of the natives to embrace Malayness by converting to Islam, emulating the Malay speech and their dress. Pahang Malays share similar cultural traits with other sub-groups of Malay people native to the Malay Peninsula. They are in particular closely affiliated to peoples of the east coast of the peninsula like Thai Malays, Terengganuan Malays and Kelantanese Malays.

Unlike the relatively homogeneous Malay culture, the cultural features Orang Asli are represented by significantly diverse tribal identities. Prior to the 1960, the various indigenous groups did not consciously adopt a common ethnic marker to differentiate themselves from the Malays. The label 'Orang Asli' itself was historically came from the British. Each tribe has its own language and culture, and perceives itself as different from the others. This micro identity was largely derived spatially, from geographical area they traditionally settled. Their cultural distinctiveness was relative only to other Orang Asli communities, and these perceived differences were great enough for each group to regard itself as unique from the other.

In 1971, the government created a "National Cultural Policy", defining Malaysian culture. It stated that Malaysian culture must be based on the culture of the indigenous peoples of Malaysia, that it may incorporate suitable elements from other cultures, and that Islam must play a part in it. It also promoted the Malay language above others. This government intervention into culture has caused resentment among immigrant communities who feel their cultural freedom was lessened. Both Chinese and Indian associations have submitted memorandums to the government, accusing it of formulating an undemocratic culture policy.

=== Arts ===
Traditional visual arts was mainly centred on the areas of carving, weaving, and silversmithing, and ranges from handwoven baskets from rural areas to the silverwork of the Malay courts. The Malays had traditionally adorned their monuments, boats, weapons, tombs, musical instrument, and utensils by motives of flora, calligraphy, geometry and cosmic feature. Common artworks included ornamental kris, beetle nut sets, and woven batik and songket fabrics. The Malay handloom industry traced its origin since the 13th century when the eastern trade route flourished under Song dynasty. By the 16th century, the silk weaving industry in Pahang had perfected a style called Tenun Pahang, a special clothing fabric used in the special traditional Malay costumes and attires of Pahang rulers and palace officials. In addition to silk weaving, Batik weaving has been part of the small cottage industry in the state. Although not as popular, Pahang batik has, nevertheless, thrived as a small industry in the periphery of the fame of the Terengganu and Kelantan batik. Over the centuries, a distinctive style of Baju Kurung was developed in Pahang, commonly known as Baju Kurung Pahang or Baju Riau-Pahang, or sometimes called Baju Turki. This is a long gown styled dress, cut at the front with 7 or more buttons and worn with a sarong.

Traditional Malay music is based around percussion instruments, the most important of which is the gendang (drum). There are at least 14 types of traditional drums. Drums and other traditional percussion instruments and are often made from natural materials. Pahang traditional music may be classified as a type of old oral literature in poetic forms, which exist in several different genres. The most notable one is a set of 36 songs in Indung dance. Another significant genre is a set of healing songs in Saba dance commonly performed using shamanistic charms There are other genres exist, among others are songs from traditional dances of Mayang', Limbung and Lukah, songs from Dikir Rebana, Berdah, Main Puteri and Ugam performances, as well as Lagu dodoi (lullabies), Lagu bercerita (story telling songs) and Lagu Permainan (children game songs). Other popular Pahang folk songs included; Walinung Sari, Burung Kenek-Kenek, Pak Sang Bagok, Lagu Zikir, Lagu Orang Muda, Pak Sendayung, Anak Ayam Turun Sepuluh, Cung-Cung Nai, Awang Belanga, Kek Nong or Dayang Kek Nong, Camang Di Laut, Datuk Kemenyan Tunggal, Berlagu Ayam, Walida Sari, Raja Donan, Raja Muda, Syair Tua, Anak Dagang, Puteri Bongsu, Raja Putera, Puteri Mayang Mengurai, Puteri Tujuh, Pujuk Lebah, Ketuk Kabung (Buai Kangkong) and Tebang Tebu.

Forms of ritual theatre among the Pahang Malays include the Main Puteri, Saba and many forms of Ugam performances. There are Ugam Mayang, Ugam Lukah, Ugam Kukur and Ugam Serkap, all of which involve trance and serve as agents of healing by a Bomoh. Ugam Mayang is also popularly known in Terengganu and the rest of Malaysia as Ulek Mayang. One of the most popular dance theatre is Mak Yong, which is also performed in Kelantan and Terengganu. Popular dance forms also include Joget Pahang (a local style of Joget), Zapin Pekan and Zapin Raub (local styles of Zapin), and Dikir Pahang or Dikir Rebana (a modified and secularised form of dhikr or religious chanting, also performed in Kelantan as Dikir barat). Dikir Rebana which is further divided into Dikir Maulud and Dikir Berdah, has many songs played by a group of 5 to 7 people and was historically performed in the royal court. Pahang performing arts also include some native dance forms like Limbung, Labi-Labi, Pelanduk and Indung. A distinct form of gamelan adopted from the Javanese culture during the time of Johor Empire, known as Malay Gamelan or Gamelan Pahang, forms the main musical ensemble heritage in the state and patronised by royal court of Pahang since the 19th century.

Pahang has a strong oral tradition that has existed since before the arrival of writing, and continues today. Prominent Malay folklore of Pahang origin, includes such bardic tales as the legends of Putri Walinong Sari, Sang Kelembai, Seri Gumum of Chini Lake, and the white crocodile Seri Pahang of Pahang River. In addition to oral literature, the literary tradition in Pahang traced back to the time of the old Pahang Sultanate. Contribution into the rich Classical Malay literature is attested in the form of legal literature like Hukum Kanun Pahang and historical literature like Hikayat Pahang.

=== Cuisine ===
Traditional Pahang cuisine features a lot of seafood, similar to the traditional cuisine of other states. From its rivers and lakes come the fresh water fish such as the patin (Pangasius). Certain dishes are shared with other Malay groups, like Singgang, Tembosa, Satak and Lempeng Nyiur which also commonly found in Kelantan and Terengganu. While some other regional dishes are prepared in Pahang style like Ikan Bakar Petai and Laksa Pahang. There are also popular foreign dishes prepared with the distinctly Pahang style like Murtabak Mengkasar and Puding Diraja ('Royal Pudding'), both can be found in Pahang's royal capital, Pekan.

The staple food in a Pahang culinary tradition is rice, which is also common in any other Asian cultures. Rice is commonly served with gulai or singgang, ulam and sambal condiments. Popular sambals are sambal hitam, sambal tempoyak and sambal belacan. One of the most famous gulai in Pahang that has been established as the signature dish of the state, is Gulai Tempoyak Patin. The dish consists of juicy, tender patin fish cooked in curry made of tempoyak (fermented durian). Other notable Pahang gulai are Gulai Patin Asam Rebus (a dish similar to the Gulai Tempoyak Patin but the watery soup or gravy, tastes a little sour and spicy) and Asam Rong (a sour and slightly bitter taste gulai made of processed rubber tree fruits). Other popular Pahang dishes are Nasi Kebuli, Opor Daging and Paceri Nenas.

=== Holidays and festivals ===
Pahangites observe a number of holidays and festivities throughout the year. Some are federally gazetted public holidays and some are observed by exclusively within the state. Other festivals are observed by particular ethnic or religion groups, and the main holiday of each major group has been declared a public holiday. Hari Hol Pahang is a public holiday commemorating the death date of the former Sultan Abu Bakar. The holiday is observed every 7 May. The Sultan of Pahang's Birthday is celebrated as a public holiday on 24 October. Other most observed national holiday is Hari Merdeka (Independence Day) on 31 August, commemorating the independence of the Federation of Malaya in 1957. Malaysia Day on 16 September commemorates federation in 1963. Other notable national holidays are Labour Day (1 May) and the King's birthday (first week of June).

Muslim holidays are prominent as Islam is the state religion; Hari Raya Puasa (also called Hari Raya Aidilfitri, Malay for Eid al-Fitr), Hari Raya Haji (also called Hari Raya Aidiladha, Malay for Eid ul-Adha), Maulidur Rasul (birthday of the Prophet), and Nuzul Al-Quran. Chinese celebrate festivals such as Chinese New Year and others relating to traditional Chinese beliefs. Majority of the Chinese who are also Buddhist, celebrate Wesak Day. Hindus in Pahang celebrate Deepavali, the festival of lights, while Thaipusam, although an important federal public holiday, is not gazetted as state public holiday. Pahang's Christian community celebrates most of the holidays observed by Christians elsewhere, most notably Christmas and Easter. Despite most festivals being identified with a particular ethnic or religious group, celebrations are universal. In a custom known as "open house" all Malaysians participate in the celebrations of others, often visiting the houses of those who identify with the festival.

== Sports ==
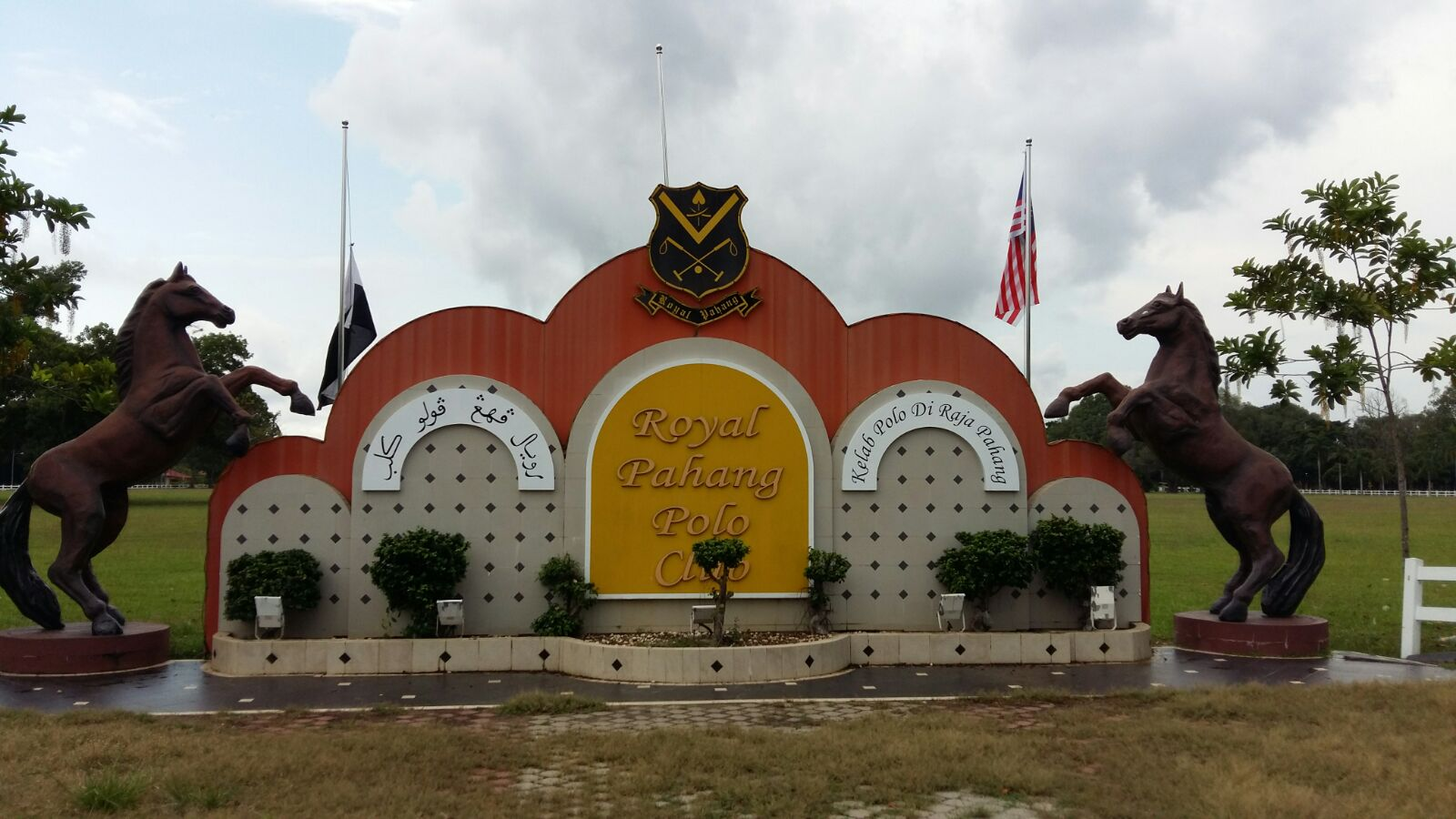
The Royal Pahang Polo Club Monument

Sports in Pahang is administered through the State Youth and Sports Committee, chaired by a member of State Executive Council. The Youth and Sports Department of Pahang is a state branch of the National Department of Youth and Sports, a department under Ministry of Youth and Sports. To produce more athletes and to improve and raise the standard of sports in the state, the Pahang State Sports Council was established in 1984. Polo is exclusively patronised by the state Royal Family in addition to association football. Founded in 1926, the Royal Pahang Polo Club is the country's one of the oldest Polo club. In the 1990s, the club started the Royal Pahang Classic, an annual high goal tournament that brought the best players in the world to play at Pekan, Pahang. The three most popular sports at national level are association football, badminton and field hockey. Sultan Ahmad Shah and his son Tengku Abdullah are the well-known figures of the Football Association of Malaysia, having headed the governing body of association football for more than three decades. Tengku Abdullah who was president of Malaysian Hockey Confederation from 2008 to 2015, is also a member of FIFA Council and president of Asian Hockey Federation. Within Malaysia, Pahang was the host of the sixth edition of SUKMA Games in 1996 and the fifteenth edition in 2012. The state also has its representatives in national camp that compete at various international sporting events.

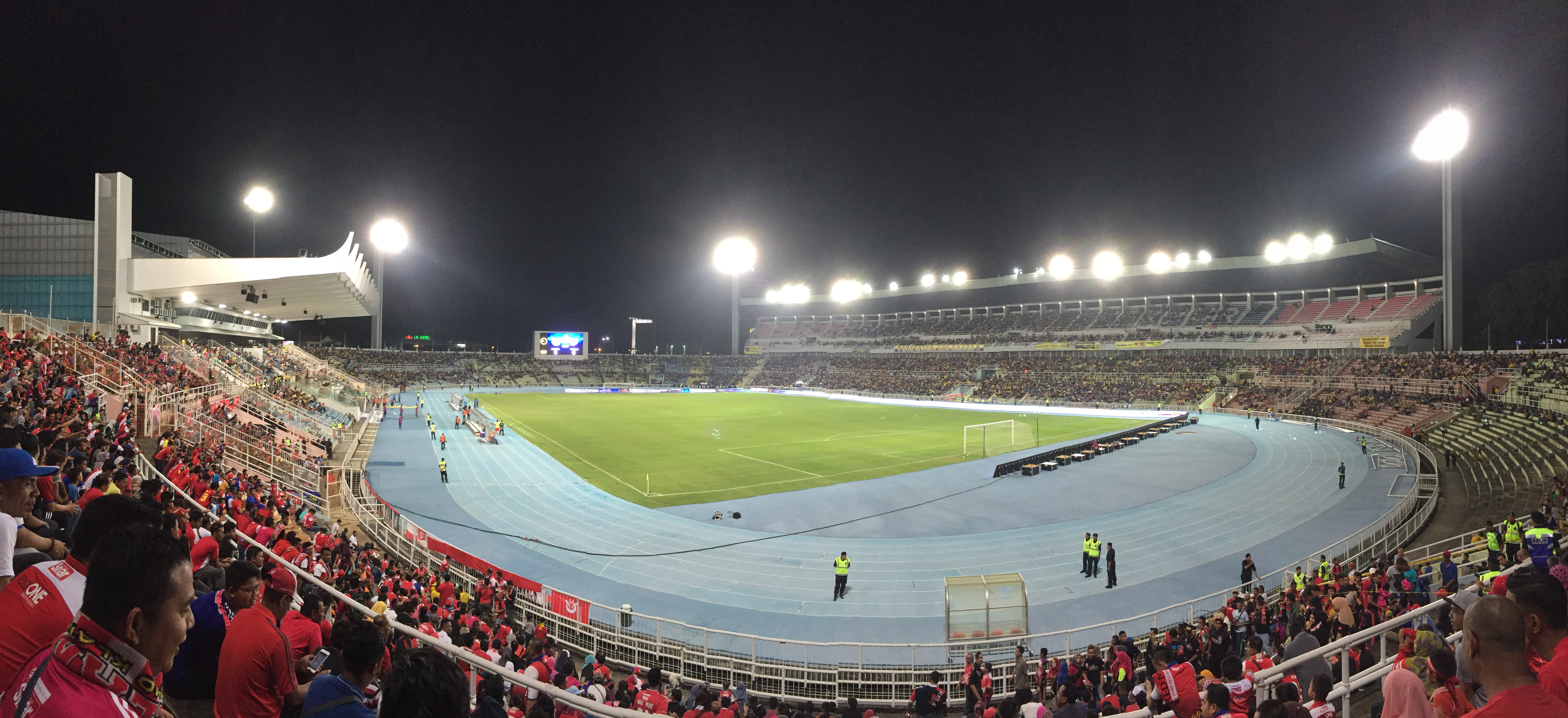
Darul Makmur Stadium

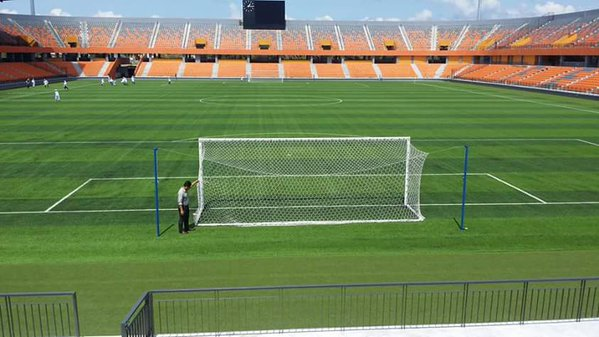
Tun Abdul Razak Stadium

The state is served by 6 main sports complexes, managed by the Youth and Sports Department, two multi-purpose stadium and a football stadium. Darul Makmur Stadium in Kuantan is the main stadium for Pahang FA that compete in Malaysia Super League, Kuantan FA that compete in Malaysia Premier League, and Shahzan Muda F.C. that compete in Malaysia FAM League. Tun Abdul Razak Stadium located in Maran District is the home stadium for Felda United F.C., another major team in Malaysia Super League. Temerloh Mini Stadium is the secondary home ground for Pahang FA and Shahzan Muda.

Traditional sports include Silat Melayu, the most common style of martial arts also practised in other states of Malaysia, Brunei, and Singapore. Silat Melayu practised in Pahang are diverse, with vast differences in training tools, methods and philosophy across different schools and styles. The Silat Melayu of Pahang may generally be divided into two major groups. Styles like Lincah, Gayong and Cekak which are widely practised at national level in Malaysia, coexist with eclectic local Pahang styles like Silat Terlak, Silat Lian, Silat Tari Pulut, Silat Melayu Lok Keris 9, Silat Sendeng 2 Beradik, Silat Tongkat Panding Juan, Silat Laksamana, Silat Sutan Muaakad, Silat Pedang, Silat Setimbun Tulang, Silat Carik Kapor and Silat Sangkar Maut.

Pahang long coastline and vast riverine systems are perfect for a wide range of water sports and activities. Rafting, sailing, jet skiing, scuba diving and surfing are among popular water sports. The surf season normally begins from October–November to February–March, during which the beaches on the East Coast becomes a no-entry danger zone during the monsoon season due to strong winds and ferocious waves. In Pahang, Cherating beach is by far one of the most popular places to surf in Malaysia.

== Tourism ==
Tourism makes up one of the largest sectors of Pahang's economy, contributing approximately 26% to the overall state gross domestic product (GDP). In 2024, the state hosted 13.7 million tourists across 13 primary destinations, generating RM12.3 billion in total visitor expenditure. Genting Highlands and Kuantan serve as the premier entry points for domestic and international visitors, alongside Cameron Highlands, Teluk Cempedak, Cherating, and Tioman Island. Of the hotels rated by the Ministry of Tourism, Arts and Culture, Pahang has the third-highest proportion of luxury hotels in Malaysia after Kuala Lumpur and Sabah, while recording the country's highest overall hotel occupancy rate at 81.1%. First World Hotel in Genting Highlands, with 7,351 rooms, is recognized by Guinness World Records as the largest hotel in the world.

Pahang structures its tourism development framework around seven dedicated regional clusters. Highland tourism encompasses the established hill stations of Cameron Highlands, Genting Highlands, Fraser's Hill, Bukit Tinggi, and Janda Baik. Cameron Highlands serves as a national hub for tea plantations, floriculture, and agrotourism, while Fraser's Hill is recognized internationally as an Important Bird Area. Coastal and island tourism covers the eastern shoreline extending from Cherating, Beserah, and Batu Hitam down to Kuala Rompin, as well as Tioman Island. The waters surrounding Tioman and the Seri Buat archipelago are gazetted marine parks protected for marine biodiversity.

Ecotourism and geotourism are concentrated around primary rainforests and freshwater ecosystems. Major ecotourism hubs include Taman Negara (one of the world's oldest tropical rainforests), Endau-Rompin National Park, Tasik Bera (Malaysia's first Ramsar site), Tasik Chini, and the Krau Wildlife Reserve, which houses the Kuala Gandah Elephant Conservation Centre. Geotourism is centered around the Lipis Geopark, featuring 28 designated geosites such as Gua Sisik Naga, Merapoh karst landscapes, and Gua Senyum.

Urban, cultural, and heritage tourism focuses on historical administrative and royal centres, notably Pekan (the royal capital, known for the Sultan Abu Bakar Museum and traditional Tenun Pahang Diraja weaving), Kuala Lipis (noted for colonial-era architecture), Kuantan, Temerloh, and Maran.

Additional specialized tourism sectors in Pahang include rail, MICE, agrotourism, and gastronomy. Rail tourism leverages heritage and scenic corridors along the KTM Jungle Railway and the East Coast Rail Link (ECRL). Meetings, Incentives, Conferences and Exhibitions (MICE) facilities are centered in Kuantan, Cherating, Genting Highlands, Cameron Highlands, and Tioman Island. Agrotourism and gastronomy span across all 11 districts, highlighting agricultural produce, tea estates, fruit orchards, and Pahang culinary heritage such as Gulai Tempoyak Patin.

Under state spatial planning initiatives, key high-impact infrastructure projects have been earmarked to enhance regional connectivity. These include proposed international airport infrastructure in Tioman and Cherating, a feasibility study for an aerial tramway cable car network connecting Cameron Highlands, Tapah, and Simpang Pulai, and the development of specialized tourism gateways at Teluk Gading and Kuala Sat.

Tourist attractions in Pahang

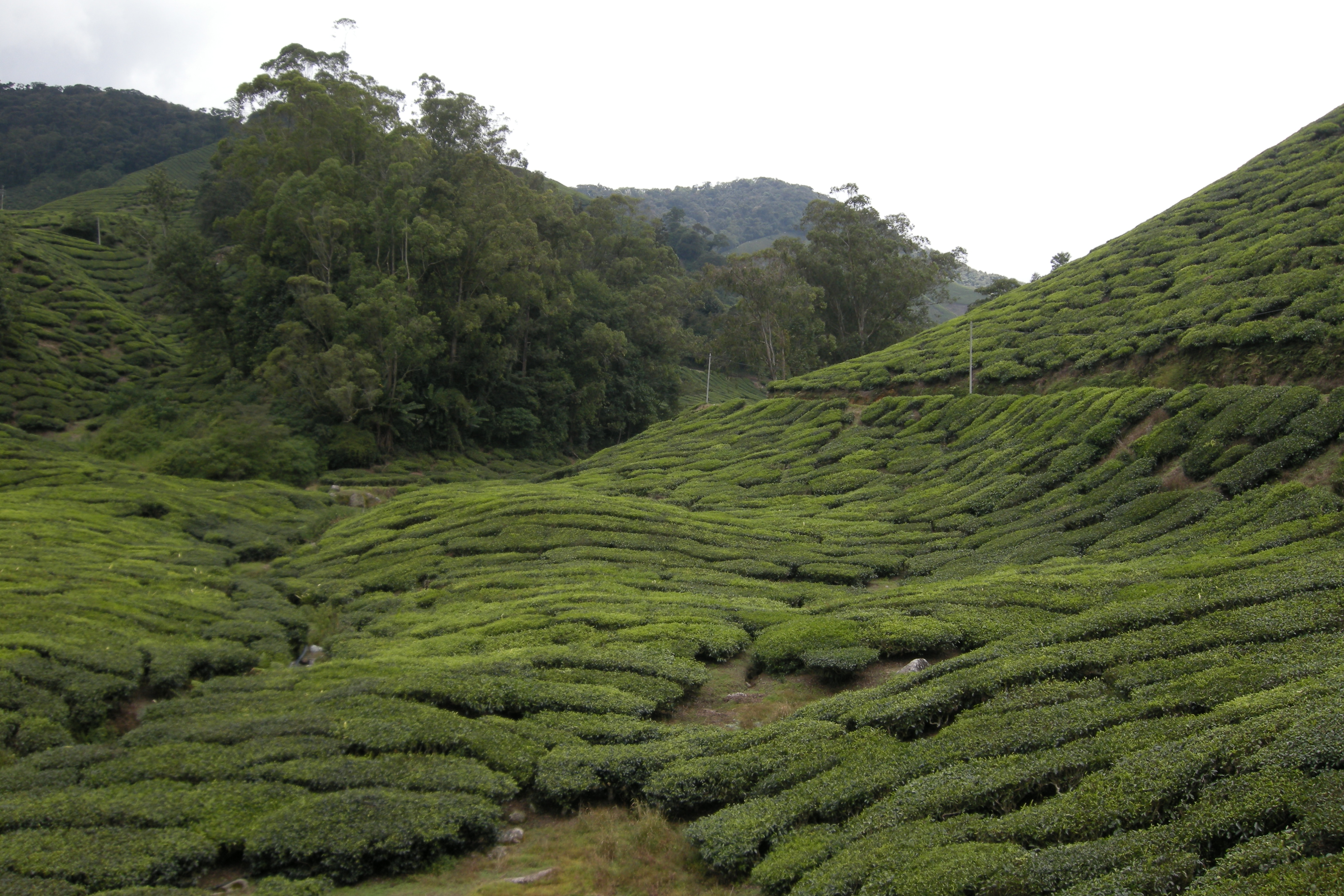
Cameron Highlands

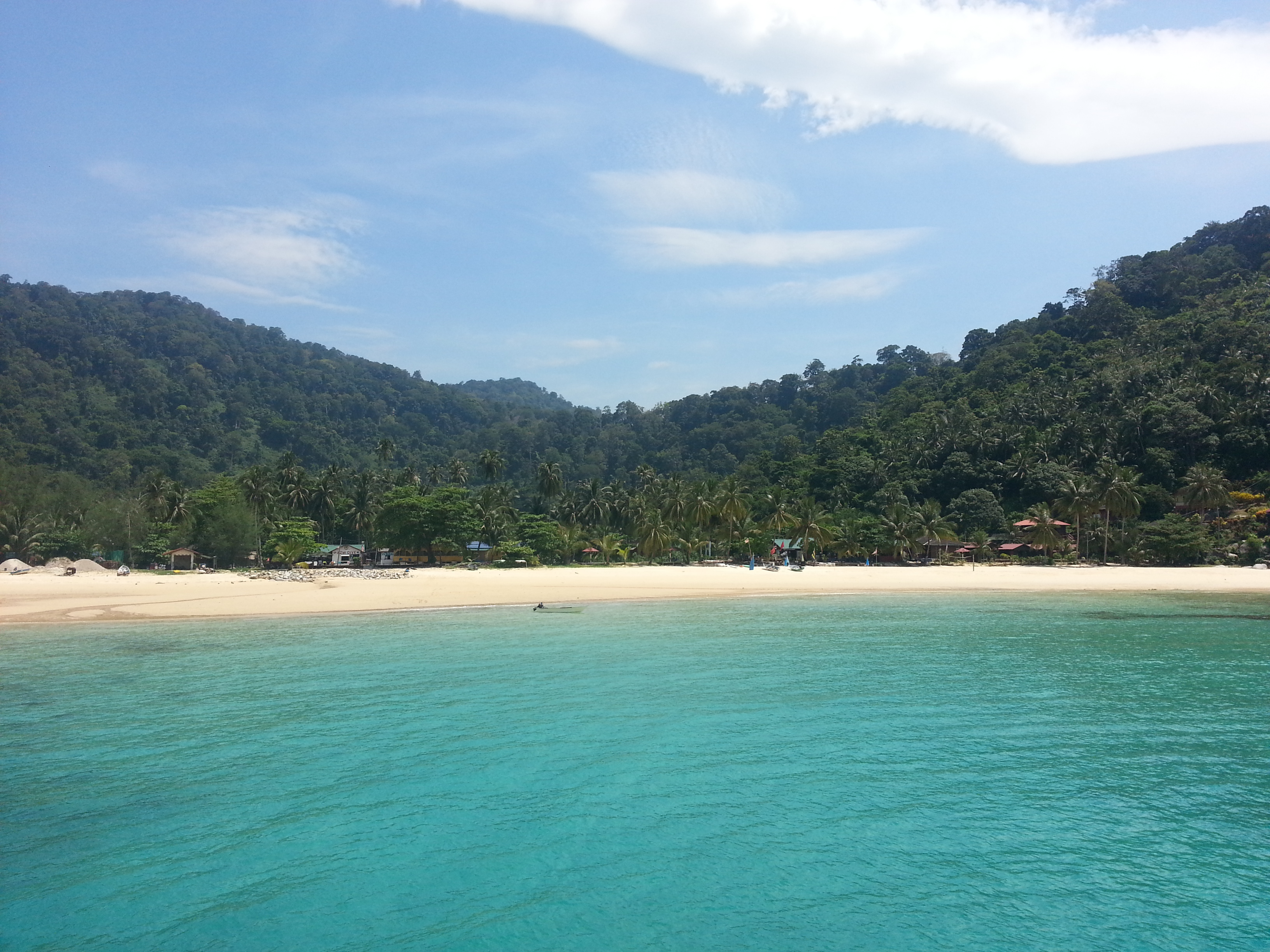
Salang Bay, Tioman Island

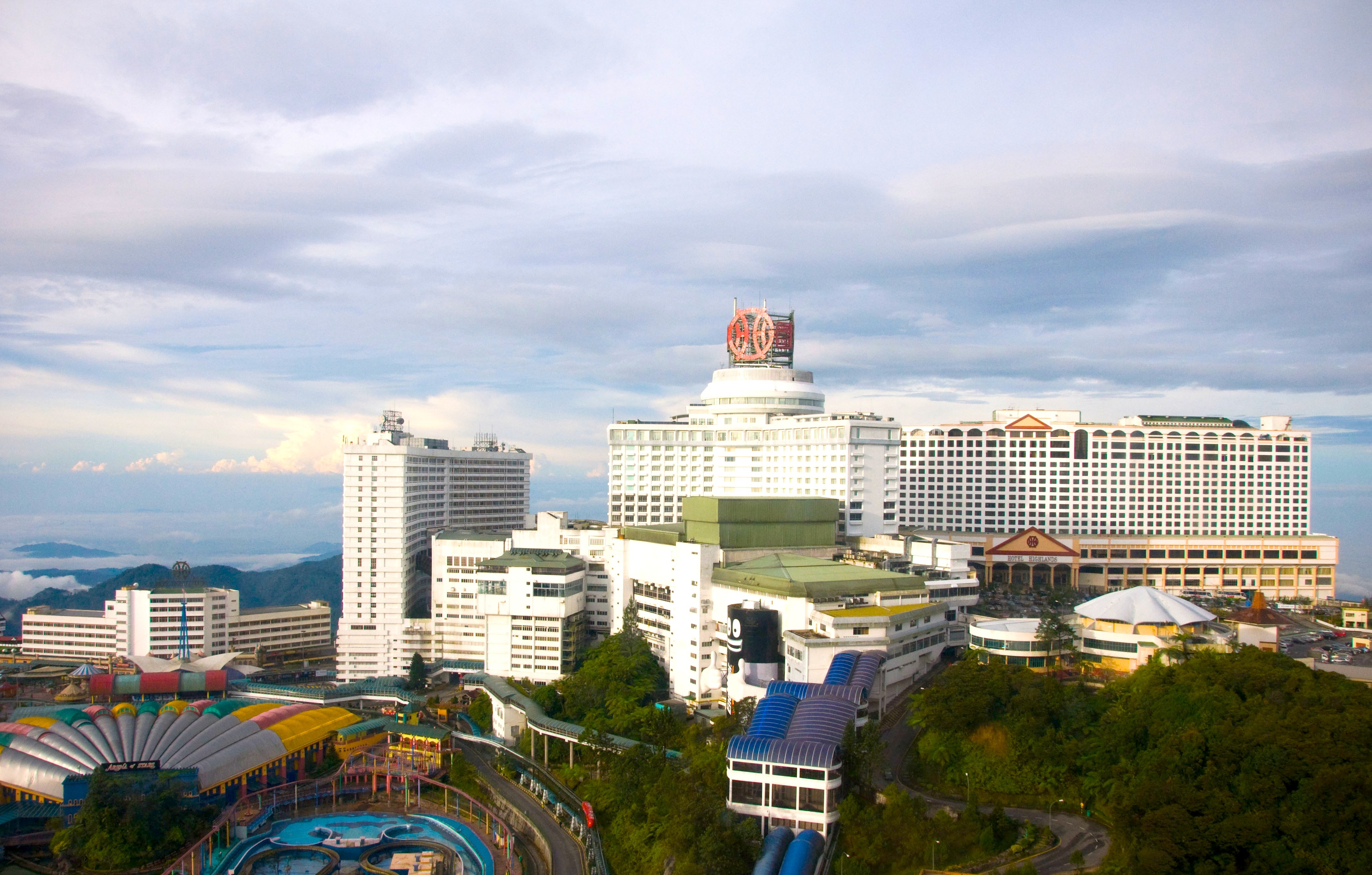
Genting Highlands resort complex

== Bibliography ==
- Ahmad Sarji Abdul Hamid (2011), The Encyclopedia of Malaysia, vol. 16 - The Rulers of Malaysia, Editions Didier Millet, ISBN 978-981-3018-54-9
- Andaya, Barbara Watson; Andaya, Leonard Yuzon (1984), A History of Malaysia, London: Palgrave Macmillan, ISBN 978-0-312-38121-9
- Aripin Said (1997), Lagu-Lagu Tradisional Rakyat Pahang (Pahang folk songs), Kementerian Kebudayaan, Kesenian dan Pelancongan, ISBN 967-903-014-8
- Barnard, Timothy P. (2004), Contesting Malayness: Malay identity across boundaries, Singapore: Singapore University press, ISBN 9971-69-279-1
- Betts, Russel H (1965), The Mass Media of Malaya and Singapore of 1965: A Survey of Literature, Center for International Studies Massachusetts Institute of Technology
- Britnell, Mark (2015), In Search of the Perfect Health System, London: Palgrave, ISBN 978-1-137-49661-4
- Chan, Cheong Jan (1998), "Malay Traditional Folk Songs In UIu Tembeling: Its Potential For A Comprehensive Study" (PDF), Pertanika Journal of Social Sciences & Humanities, 6, ISSN 0128-7702, archived from the original (PDF) on 11 October 2016
- Collins, James Thomas (1989), "Malay Dialect Research in Malaysia: The Issue of Perspective" (PDF), Bijdragen tot de Taal-, Land- en Volkenkunde, 145 (2): 235–264, doi:10.1163/22134379-90003253, archived (PDF) from the original on 9 October 2022
- Dunford, George (2006), Southeast Asia on a Shoestring, Lonely Planet, pp. 419–, ISBN 978-1-74104-444-7
- Farish A Noor (2011), From Inderapura to Darul Makmur, A Deconstructive History of Pahang, Silverfish Books, ISBN 978-983-3221-30-1
- Guy, John (2014), Lost Kingdoms: Hindu-Buddhist Sculpture of Early Southeast Asia, Metropolitan Museum of Art, ISBN 978-0300-204-37-7
- Hood Salleh (2011), The Encyclopedia of Malaysia, vol. 12 - Peoples and Traditions, Editions Didier Millet, ISBN 978-981-3018-53-2
- Hill, R.D. (2013), Agriculture in the Malaysian Region, National University of Singapore Press, ISBN 978-9971-696-01-6
- Jacq-Hergoualc'h, Michel (2002). The Malay Peninsula: Crossroads of the Maritime Silk-Road (100 Bc-1300 Ad). BRILL. ISBN 90-04-11973-6.
- Ismail Said (2005), Criteria for Selecting Timber Species in Malay Woodcarving (PDF), University Teknologi Malaysia, archived from the original (PDF) on 19 October 2012
- Khoo, Gilbert (1980), From Pre-Malaccan period to present day, New Straits Times
- Khor, Samantha (2016), 10 Pahang Dishes You Should Try Before You Die
- Linehan, William (1973), History of Pahang, Malaysian Branch Of The Royal Asiatic Society, Kuala Lumpur, ISBN 978-0710-101-37-2
- Maznah Mohammad (2000), The Malay handloom weavers: a study of the rise and decline of traditional manufacture, Institute of Southeast Asian Studies, ISBN 978-9813-016-99-6
- Miller, Terry E.; Williams, Sean (2008), The Garland handbook of Southeast Asian music, Taylor and Francis Group, pp. 223–224, ISBN 978-0-203-93144-8
- Milner, Anthony (2010), The Malays (The Peoples of South-East Asia and the Pacific), Wiley-Blackwell, ISBN 978-1444-339-03-1
- Mines Bureau; Geological Survey; Interior Department, eds. (2015), Minerals Yearbook: Area Reports: International Review 2012 Asia And The Pacific, Government Printing Office, ISBN 978-1411-336-76-6
- Mishra, Patit Paban (2010), The History of Thailand, Greenwood, ISBN 978-0313-340-91-8
- Munoz, Paul Michel (2007), Early Kingdoms of The Indonesian Archipelago and the Malay Peninsula, Didier Millet, ISBN 978-9814155670
- Norazit Selat (2000), Pahang: Sejarah dan Budaya (Pahang: History and Culture), Lembaga Muzium Negeri Pahang (Muzium Authority of Pahang)
- The Report - Malaysia 2010, Oxford Business, 2010, ISBN 978-1907-065-20-0
- Rajani, Chand Chirayu (1987), Towards a history of Laem Thong and Sri Vijaya (Asian studies monographs), Institute of Asian Studies, Chulalongkorn University, ISBN 978-9745-675-01-8
- (Tun) Suzana (Tun) Othman (2002), Institusi Bendahara: Permata Melayu yang Hilang: Dinasti Bendahara Johor-Pahang (The Bendahara Institution: The Lost Malay Jewel: The Dynasty of Bendahara of Johor-Pahang), Pustaka BSM Enterprise, ISBN 983-40566-6-4
- Zakiah Hanum (1989), Asal-usul negeri-negeri di Malaysia (The Origin of States in Malaysia), Times Books International, ISBN 978-9971-654-67-2
- Zaki Ragman (2003). Gateway to Malay culture. Asiapac Books Ptd Ltd. p. 110. ISBN 981-229-326-4.
- WWF-Malaysia (1997), WWF Malaysia's Conservation Efforts in Pahang Darul Makmur (PDF), WWF, archived from the original (PDF) on 13 October 2017
- Y. Tachikawa; R. James; K. Abdullah; Mohd. Nor bin Mohd. Desa (2004), Catalogue of Rivers for Southeast Asia and The Pacific (PDF), vol. 5 - Malaysia - Pahang, The Unesco-IHP Regional Steering Committee for Southeast Asia and The Pacific
