= Amizar Abu Adam =

Malaysian politician

Yang Berhormat Dato' Amizar Abu Adam DIMP AAP PJK MLA
- أميزر أبو آدم

Member of the Pahang State Executive Council (FELDA Affairs, Cooperative & Entrepreneur Development : since 14 February 2024) (Note: Assumed portfolios 1 day after taking office on 14 February 2024.)
- Incumbent
- Assumed office 13 February 2024
- Monarch: Abdullah
- Menteri Besar: Wan Rosdy Wan Ismail
- Preceded by: Razali Kassim
- Constituency: Pelangai

Member of the Pahang State Legislative Assembly for Pelangai
- Incumbent
- Assumed office 7 October 2023
- Preceded by: Johari Harun (BN–UMNO)
- Majority: 2,949 (2023)

Personal details
- Born: Amizar bin Abu Adam; 7 July 1973 (age 53) Malacca, Malaysia
- Citizenship: Malaysian
- Party: United Malays National Organisation (UMNO)
- Other political affiliations: Barisan Nasional (BN)
- Education: Universiti Sains Malaysia
- Occupation: Politician

Amizar bin Abu Adam (born 1973) is a Malaysian politician who has served as Member of the Pahang State Executive Council (EXCO) in the Barisan Nasional (BN) state administration under Menteri Besar Wan Rosdy Wan Ismail since February 2024 and Member of the Pahang State Legislative Assembly (MLA) for Pelangai since October 2023. He is a member and Division Committee Member of Bentong of the United Malays National Organisation (UMNO), a component party of the BN coalition.

== Political career ==
=== Candidate for the Member of the Pahang State Legislative Assembly (2022) ===
==== 2022 Pahang state election ====
In the 2022 Pahang state election, Amizar made his electoral debut after being nominated by BN to contest for the Ketari state seat. He was not elected as the Ketari MLA after losing narrowly to Thomas Su Keong Siong of Pakatan Harapan (PH) by a minority of only 120 votes.

=== Member of the Pahang State Legislative Assembly (since 2023) ===
==== 2023 Pelangai by-election ====
In the 2023 Pelangai by-election held on 7 October 2023 due to the vacancy of the state seat as a result of its MLA Johari Harun in the Elmina plane crash on 17 August 2023, Amizar was renominated by BN to contest for the state seat. He won the seat and was elected to the Pahang State Legislative Assembly as the Pelangai MLA for the first term after defeating Kasim Samat of Perikatan Nasional (PN) and independent candidate Haslihelmy DM Zulhasli by a majority of 2,949 votes.

=== Member of the Pahang State Executive Council (since 2024) ===
On 13 February 2024, Amizar was appointed as Pahang EXCO Member to fill the vacancy left by Johari. The following day on 14 February 2024, Amizar was given the portfolios of FELDA Affairs, Cooperative and Entrepreneur Development which were previously assumed by Muadzam Shah MLA Razali Kassim.

== Election results ==
Pahang State Legislative Assembly
Year	Constituency	Candidate	Votes	Pct	Opponent(s)	Votes	Pct	Ballots cast	Majority	Turnout
2022	N34 Ketari	Amizar Abu Adam (UMNO)	9,602	40.66%	Su Keong Siong (DAP)	9,722	41.17%	23,614	120	77.71%
2022	N34 Ketari	Amizar Abu Adam (UMNO)	9,602	40.66%	William Tan Wei Leong (Gerakan)	4,290	18.17%	23,614	120	77.71%
2023	N36 Pelangai	Amizar Abu Adam (UMNO)	7,324	62.35%	Kasim Samat (PAS)	4,375	37.25%	11,746	2,949	72.12%
2023	N36 Pelangai	Amizar Abu Adam (UMNO)	7,324	62.35%	Haslihelmy DM Zulhasli (IND)	47	0.40%	11,746	2,949	72.12%

== Honours ==
- Pahang
  - Knight Companion of the Order of the Crown of Pahang (DIMP) – Dato' (2016)
  - Member of the Order of Sultan Ahmad Shah of Pahang (AAP)
  - Recipient of the Meritorious Service Medal (PJK) (2012)
