= Mohd. Fakhruddin Mohd. Arif =

Malaysian politician

Yang Berhormat Dato' Seri Mohammad Fakhruddin Mohd Ariff SSAP DSAP DIMP AMN AMP PKT MLA
- محمّد فخرالدين محمّد عارف

Member of the Pahang State Executive Council
- Incumbent
- Assumed office 14 February 2024
- Monarch: Abdullah
- Menteri Besar: Wan Rosdy Wan Ismail
- Portfolio: Housing, Local Government, Environment & Green Technology
- Preceded by: Johari Harun
- Constituency: Bebar
- In office 2 December 2022 – 14 February 2024
- Monarch: Abdullah
- Menteri Besar: Wan Rosdy Wan Ismail
- Portfolio: Works, Transport & Health : 14 December 2022–14 February 2024 (Note: Assumed portfolios 12 days after taking office on 2 December 2022.)
- Preceded by: Syed Ibrahim Syed Ahmad (Health); Portfolios established (Works & Transport)
- Succeeded by: Razali Kassim
- Constituency: Bebar
- In office 15 May 2018 – 28 November 2022
- Monarchs: Ahmad Shah (2018–2019); Abdullah (2019–2022)
- Menteri Besar: Wan Rosdy Wan Ismail
- Portfolio: Science, Technology, Green Technology, Communications & Multimedia (Note: Assumed portfolios 8 days after taking office on 23 May 2018.)
- Preceded by: Adnan Yaakob (Science, Technology & Green Technology); Shahaniza Shamsuddin (Communications & Multimedia)
- Succeeded by: Nizar Najib (Science & Technology); Fadzli Mohamad Kamal (Communications & Multimedia); Johari Harun (Green Technology)
- Constituency: Bebar

Member of the Pahang State Legislative Assembly for Bebar
- Incumbent
- Assumed office 5 May 2013
- Preceded by: Ishak Muhamad (BN–UMNO)
- Majority: 6,715 (2013); 5,720 (2018); 6,273 (2022)

Faction represented in the Pahang State Legislative Assembly
- 2013–: Barisan Nasional

Personal details
- Born: 10 September 1966 (age 60) Pahang, Malaysia
- Party: United Malays National Organisation (UMNO)
- Other political affiliations: Barisan Nasional (BN)
- Education: University of Miami
- Occupation: Politician
- Profession: Industrial engineer

Mohammad Fakhruddin bin Mohd Ariff is a Malaysian politician who has served as Member of the Pahang State Executive Council (EXCO) in the Barisan Nasional (BN) state administration under Menteri Besar Wan Rosdy Wan Ismail since May 2018 and Member of the Pahang State Legislative Assembly (MLA) for Bebar since May 2013. He is a member and the Division Chief of Pekan of the United Malays National Organisation (UMNO), a component party of the BN coalition.

== Election results ==
Pahang State Legislative Assembly
Year	Constituency	Candidate	Votes	Pct	Opponent(s)	Votes	Pct	Ballots cast	Majority	Turnout
2013	N22 Bebar	Mohammad Fakhruddin Mohd Ariff (UMNO)	8,846	80.59%	Mohd Jafri Ab. Rashid (PKR)	2,131	19.41%	11,290	6,715	84.20%
2018	N22 Bebar	Mohammad Fakhruddin Mohd Ariff (UMNO)	8,172	70.50%	Mohd Nazhar Othman (PAS)	2,452	21.15%	11,970	5,720	80.00%
2018	N22 Bebar	Mohammad Fakhruddin Mohd Ariff (UMNO)	8,172	70.50%	Afif Syairol Abdul Rahim (BERSATU)	968	8.35%	11,970	5,720	80.00%
2022	N22 Bebar	Mohammad Fakhruddin Mohd Ariff (UMNO)	10,485	67.37%	Narzatul Haidar Sakim (BERSATU)	4,212	27.06%	15,563	6,273	73.09%
2022	N22 Bebar	Mohammad Fakhruddin Mohd Ariff (UMNO)	10,485	67.37%	Ibrahim Sulaiman (AMANAH)	866	5.56%	15,563	6,273	73.09%

== Honours ==
=== Honours of Malaysia ===
- Malaysia
  - Member of the Order of the Defender of the Realm (AMN) (2011)
- Pahang
  - Grand Knight of the Order of Sultan Ahmad Shah of Pahang (SSAP) – Dato' Sri (2026)
  - Knight Companion of the Order of Sultan Ahmad Shah of Pahang (DSAP) – Dato' (2018)
  - Knight Companion of the Order of the Crown of Pahang (DIMP) – Dato' (2015)
  - Member of the Order of the Crown of Pahang (AMP)
  - Recipient of the Distinguished Conduct Medal (PKT)
