= 2023 Pelangai by-election =

By-election in Malaysia in 2023

- 7 October 2023

N36 (Pelangai) seat in the Pahang State Legislative Assembly
	First party	Second party
	BN	PN
Candidate	Amizar Abu Adam	Kasim Samat
Party	UMNO	PAS
Alliance	BN	PN
Popular vote	7,324	4,375
Percentage	62.35%	37.25%
Pelangai assemblyman before election
Johari Harun (deceased)
Barisan Nasional (UMNO)
Elected Pelangai assemblyman
Amizar Abu Adam
Barisan Nasional (UMNO)

A by-election was held on 7 October 2023 in the Pelangai state constituency due to the death of incumbent Johari Harun on 17 August 2023 as a result of the Elmina plane crash.

This is the latest by-election in Pahang after the 2020 Chini by-election. (Note: Not counting the state by-election for Tioman, which were delayed to 7 December 2022 because of death of one of its candidate after nomination day for GE15. The Tioman by-election and result are considered as part of the 2022 Pahang state election.)

== Background ==
Pelangai is a state constituency in the Malaysian state of Pahang, and one of the four constituencies in the federal constituency of Bentong. As of August 2023, Supplementary Electoral Roll used by Election Commission (EC) for this by-election, Pelangai has 16,456 eligible registered voters, including 36 voters from the police force and 3 abroad voters.

The incumbent, Johari had held the seat for only 9 months since the 15th General Election on 19 November 2022, representing the United Malays National Organisation (UMNO) party under the Barisan Nasional (BN) coalition. The UMNO Youth Chief for Bentong, he had replaced former Menteri Besar Adnan Yaakob, who has held the seat since elected in 1986 until his retirement in 2022. Johari won the seat in the 2022 Pahang state election, defeating 3 other candidates with 4,048 votes majority over his nearest rival. He had been the Pahang EXCO member for the portfolio of local government, housing, environment, and green technology until his death.

== Nomination and campaign ==
Candidates nomination day was announced by Election Commission (EC) to be on 23 September 2023. BN has stated that it would nominate its candidate to defend the seat, and Perikatan Nasional (PN) also confirmed its intention to contest. Pakatan Harapan (PH), the other major party in the country, decided not to contest this by-election, instead helping to campaign on behalf of its partner in the federal and state government, BN. On the nomination day, 3 candidates were accepted: Amizar Abu Adam from BN, Kasim Samat from PN, and Haslihelmy DM Zulhasli as an independent candidate.

Amizar was announced as the BN candidate on 20 September, by the UMNO Vice President, UMNO Pahang Chief and Pahang Menteri Besar, Wan Rosdy Wan Ismail. Amizar, an UMNO Bentong Committee member, had previously contested in Ketari in the 2022 Pahang state election but lost by a slim majority of 120 votes.

On the same day as Amizar's announcement, PN's candidate Kasim Samat was announced by PAS Deputy President, Dato' Sri Tuan Ibrahim Tuan Man. The PAS Bentong Vice Chief and former teacher, Kasim was re-nominated after losing to Johari in the same seat 9 months earlier.

Haslihelmy DM Zulhasli, the president for NGO Pertubuhan Suara Anak Pahang (PSAP) is the first person to announce his intention to contest as independent on 29 August. A businessman born in Pelangai, he was an UMNO member for 15 years. His motivation to contest the election is to bring the local and youth voice to the State Assembly, and also in protest of UMNO's choice of Amizar as its candidate for the by-election. Haslihelmy's decision to contest in the by-election resulted on his UMNO membership being terminated on the nomination day.

== Timeline ==
The key dates are listed below.

Date	Event
24 August 2023	Issue of the Writ of Election
23 September 2023	Nomination Day
23 September 2023 – 6 October 2023	Campaigning Period
3–6 October 2023	Early Polling Day For Postal, Overseas and Advance Voters
7 October 2023	Polling Day

== Results ==
Pahang state by-election, 7 October 2023: Pelangai Upon the death of incumbent, Johari Harun
Party	Candidate	Votes	%	∆%
BN	Amizar Abu Adam	7,324	62.35	+4.64
PN	Kasim Samat	4,375	37.25	+11.51
Independent	Haslihelmey DM Zulhasli	47	0.40	+0.40
Total valid votes		11,746	100.00	
Total rejected ballots		120		
Unreturned ballots		2		
Turnout		11,868	72.12	
Registered electors		16,456		
Majority		2,949		
BN hold		Swing		

== Previous results ==
Pahang state election, 2022: Pelangai
Party	Candidate	Votes	%	∆%
BN	Johari Harun	7,308	57.71	
PN	Kasim Samat	3,260	25.74	
PH	Ahmed Wafiuddin Shamsuri	2,031	16.04	
PEJUANG	Isa Ahmad	65	0.51	
Total valid votes		12,664	100.00	
Total rejected ballots		164		
Unreturned ballots		18		
Turnout		12,846		
Registered electors		16,371		
Majority		4,048		
BN hold		Swing		

== Aftermath ==
Amizar, the winner of the by-election, were sworn in as the new MLA for Pelangai on 13 February 2024, 4 months after his victory, before the Sultan of Pahang, Sultan Abdullah at Istana Abdulaziz. The following day, Pahang MB, Wan Rosdy announced reshuffling of the State EXCO portfolios, in which Amizar was appointed EXCO of Felda Affairs, Cooperatives and Entrepreneurs.
