= Menteri Besar of Pahang =

First Minister of Pahang

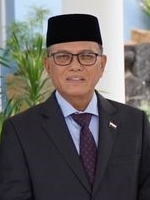
- Incumbent; Wan Rosdy Wan Ismail since 15 May 2018
- Government of Pahang
- Style: Yang Amat Berhormat (The Most Honourable)
- Member of: Pahang State Executive Council
- Reports to: Pahang State Legislative Assembly
- Residence: Jalan Telok Sisek, 25000 Kuantan, Pahang
- Seat: Wisma Sri Pahang, 25502 Kuantan, Pahang
- Appointer: Tengku Hassanal Ibrahim Alam Shah; Pemangku Raja (Regent) of Pahang
- Term length: 5 years or lesser, renewable once (while commanding the confidence of the Pahang State Legislative Assembly With State Elections held no more than five years apart)
- Inaugural holder: Mahmud Mat
- Formation: 1 February 1948; 78 years ago
- Deputy: Vacant
- Website: www.pahang.gov.my/yab-menteri-besar-pahang

The Menteri Besar Pahang or First Minister of Pahang is the head of government in the Malaysian state of Pahang. According to convention, the Menteri Besar is the leader of the majority party or largest coalition party of the Pahang State Legislative Assembly.

The 14th and current Menteri Besar of Pahang is Wan Rosdy, who took office on 15 May 2018.

== Appointment ==
According to the state constitution, the Sultan of Pahang shall first appoint the Menteri Besar to preside over the Executive Council and requires such Menteri Besar to be a member of the Legislative Assembly who in his judgment is likely to command the confidence of the majority of the members of the Assembly, must be an ethnic Malay who professes the religion of Islam and must not a Malaysian citizen by naturalisation or by registration. The Sultan on the Menteri Besar's advice shall appoint not more than ten nor less than four members from among the members of the Legislative Assembly.

The member of the Executive Council must take and subscribe in the presence of the Sultan the oath of office and allegiance as well as the oath of secrecy before they can exercise the functions of office. The Executive Council shall be collectively responsible to the Legislative Assembly. The members of the Executive Council shall not hold any office of profit and engage in any trade, business or profession that will cause conflict of interest.

If a government cannot get its appropriation (budget) legislation passed by the Legislative Assembly, or the Legislative Assembly passes a vote of "no confidence" in the government, the Menteri Besar is bound by convention to resign immediately. The Sultan's choice of replacement Menteri Besar will be dictated by the circumstances. A member of the Executive Council other than the Menteri Besar shall hold office during the pleasure of the Sultan, unless the appointment of any member of the Executive Council shall have been revoked by the Sultan on the advice of the Menteri Besar but may at any time resign his office.

Following a resignation in other circumstances, defeated in an election or the death of the Menteri Besar, the Sultan will generally appoint as Menteri Besar the person voted by the governing party as their new leader.

== Powers ==
The power of the Menteri Besar is subject to a number of limitations. Menteri Besar removed as leader of his or her party, or whose government loses a vote of no confidence in the Legislative Assembly, must advise a state election or resign the office or be dismissed by the Sultan. The defeat of a supply bill (one that concerns the spending of money) or unable to pass important policy-related legislation is seen to require the resignation of the government or dissolution of Legislative Assembly, much like a non-confidence vote, since a government that cannot spend money is hamstrung, also called loss of supply.

The Menteri Besar's party will normally have a majority in the Legislative Assembly and party discipline is exceptionally strong in Pahang politics, so passage of the government's legislation through the Legislative Assembly is mostly a formality.

== Caretaker Menteri Besar ==
The legislative assembly unless sooner dissolved by the Sultan with His Majesty's own discretion on the advice of the Menteri Besar shall continue for five years from the date of its first meeting. The state constitution permits a delay of 60 days of general election to be held from the date of dissolution and the legislative assembly shall be summoned to meet on a date not later than 120 days from the date of dissolution. Conventionally, between the dissolution of one legislative assembly and the convening of the next, the Menteri Besar and the executive council remain in office in a caretaker capacity.

== List of Menteris Besar of Pahang ==
The following is the list of Menteris Besar of Pahang since 1948:

Colour key (for political parties):
UMNO Alliance / Barisan Nasional

No.	Portrait	Name Constituency (Birth–Death)	Term of office			Party (Note: This column names only the Menteri Besar's party. The state government he heads may be a complex coalition of several parties and independents; those are not listed here.)	Election	Assembly
No.	Portrait	Name Constituency (Birth–Death)	Took office	Left office	Time in office	Party	Election	Assembly
1		Haji Sir Mahmud Haji Sir Mat (1894–1971)	1 February 1948	1 February 1951	3 years, 1 day	UMNO	–	–
2		Tengku Muhammad Sultan Haji Sir Ahmad (1901–1957)	1 February 1951	1 February 1955	4 years, 1 day	UMNO	–	–
2		Tengku Muhammad Sultan Haji Sir Ahmad (1901–1957)	1 February 1951	1 February 1955	4 years, 1 day	Alliance (UMNO)	–	–
3		Abdul Razak Hussein (1922–1976)	1 February 1955	15 June 1955	135 days	Alliance (UMNO)	–	–
4		Tengku Muhammad Sultan Haji Sir Ahmad (1901–1957)	15 June 1955	8 January 1957	1 year, 208 days	Alliance (UMNO)	–	–
5		Raja Abdullah Tok Muda Ibrahim (1914-?)	9 January 1957	18 July 1959	2 years, 191 days	Alliance (UMNO)	–	–
6		Wan Abdul Aziz Ungku Abdullah (1914-?); MLA for Chenor	18 July 1959	5 May 1964	4 years, 293 days	Alliance (UMNO)	1959	1st
7		Yahya Mohd Seth; MLA for Sanggang	5 May 1964	1 July 1972	8 years, 120 days	Alliance (UMNO)	1964	2nd
7		Yahya Mohd Seth; MLA for Sanggang	5 May 1964	1 July 1972	8 years, 120 days	Alliance (UMNO)	1969	3rd
8		Abdul Aziz Ahmad; MLA for Beserah	1 July 1972	18 July 1974	1 year, 321 days	Alliance (UMNO)	–	3rd
8		Abdul Aziz Ahmad; MLA for Beserah	1 July 1972	18 July 1974	1 year, 321 days	BN (UMNO)	–	3rd
9		Muhammad Jusoh; MLA for Kuala Pahang (1912–1985)	19 July 1974	18 July 1978	4 years, 0 days	BN (UMNO)	–	3rd
9		Muhammad Jusoh; MLA for Kuala Pahang (1912–1985)	19 July 1974	18 July 1978	4 years, 0 days	BN (UMNO)	1974	4th
10		Abdul Rahim Abu Bakar; MLA for Beserah (1943–2009)	19 July 1978	7 November 1981	3 years, 112 days	BN (UMNO)	1978	5th
11		Abdul Rashid Abdul Rahman; MLA for Paya Besar (1938–2018)	7 November 1981	4 May 1982	179 days	BN (UMNO)	–	5th
12		Dato' Sri; Mohammad Najib Abdul Razak; MLA for Bandar Pekan (born 1953)	4 May 1982	14 August 1986	4 years, 103 days	BN (UMNO)	1982	6th
13		Dato' Sri; Mohd Khalil Yaakob; MLA for Bukit Tajau (until 1995); MLA for Lepar (from 1995) (born 1937)	14 August 1986	20 May 1999	12 years, 280 days	BN (UMNO)	1986	7th
13		Dato' Sri; Mohd Khalil Yaakob; MLA for Bukit Tajau (until 1995); MLA for Lepar (from 1995) (born 1937)	14 August 1986	20 May 1999	12 years, 280 days	BN (UMNO)	1990	8th
13		Dato' Sri; Mohd Khalil Yaakob; MLA for Bukit Tajau (until 1995); MLA for Lepar (from 1995) (born 1937)	14 August 1986	20 May 1999	12 years, 280 days	BN (UMNO)	1995	9th
14		Dato' Sri Diraja; Adnan Yaakob; MLA for Pelangai (born 1950)	20 May 1999	15 May 2018	18 years, 361 days	BN (UMNO)	–	9th
14		Dato' Sri Diraja; Adnan Yaakob; MLA for Pelangai (born 1950)	20 May 1999	15 May 2018	18 years, 361 days	BN (UMNO)	1999	10th
14		Dato' Sri Diraja; Adnan Yaakob; MLA for Pelangai (born 1950)	20 May 1999	15 May 2018	18 years, 361 days	BN (UMNO)	2004	11th
14		Dato' Sri Diraja; Adnan Yaakob; MLA for Pelangai (born 1950)	20 May 1999	15 May 2018	18 years, 361 days	BN (UMNO)	2008	12th
14		Dato' Sri Diraja; Adnan Yaakob; MLA for Pelangai (born 1950)	20 May 1999	15 May 2018	18 years, 361 days	BN (UMNO)	2013	13th
15		Dato' Sri Diraja; Wan Rosdy Wan Ismail; MLA for Jelai (born 1958)	15 May 2018	Incumbent	8 years, 141 days	BN (UMNO)	2018	14th
15		Dato' Sri Diraja; Wan Rosdy Wan Ismail; MLA for Jelai (born 1958)	15 May 2018	Incumbent	8 years, 141 days	BN (UMNO)	2022	15th

== Living former Menteris Besar ==
Name	Term of office	Date of birth
Mohammad Najib Abdul Razak	1982–1986	23 July 1953 (age 73)
Mohd Khalil Yaakob	1986–1999	29 December 1937 (age 88)
Adnan Yaakob	1999–2018	18 April 1950 (age 76)
