= Beechcraft Premier I =

American light business jet

Beechcraft 390 (Premier I/IA)
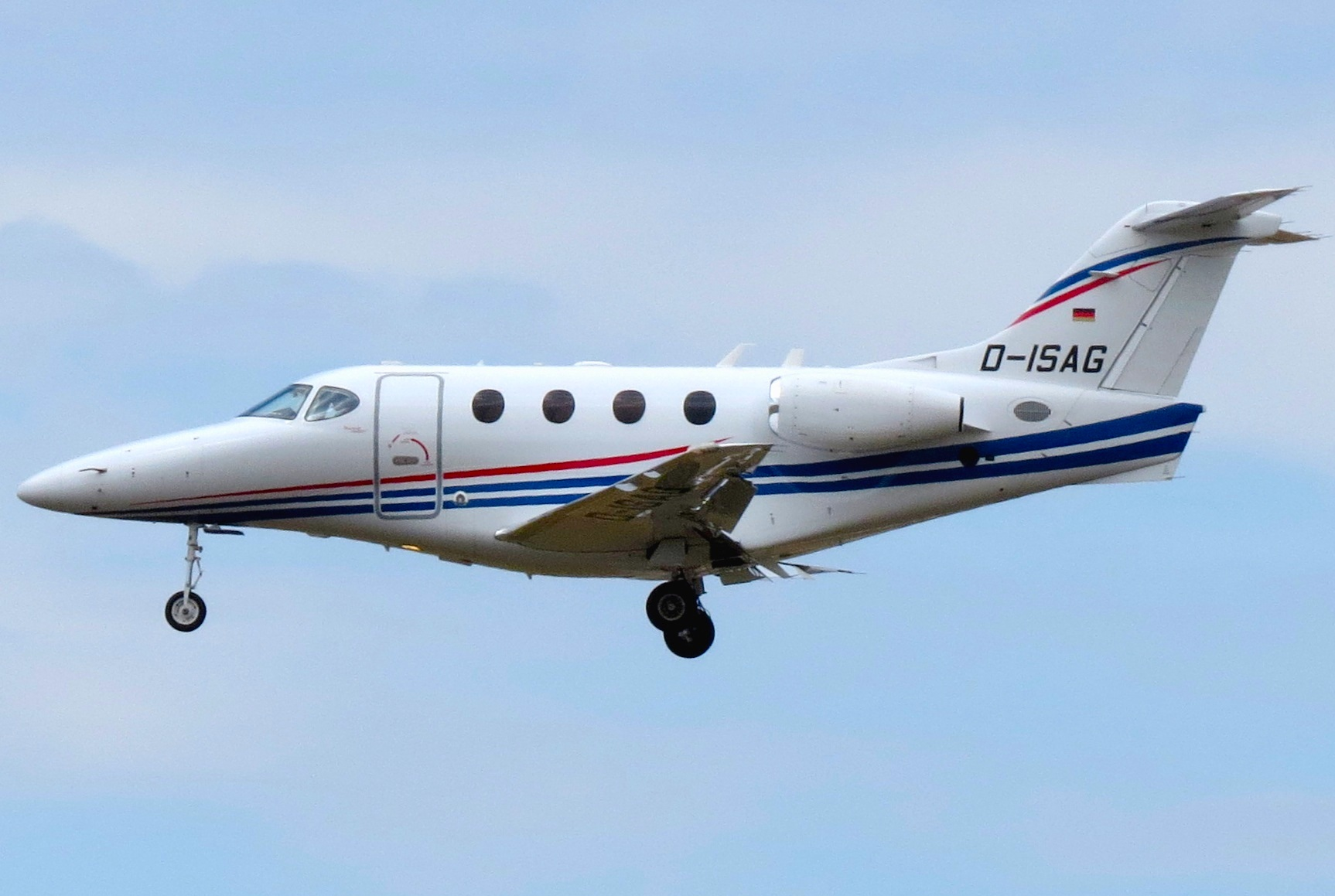

General information
- Type: Business Jet
- Manufacturer: Raytheon/Hawker Beechcraft
- Status: Active
- Number built: 292

History
- Manufactured: 2001-2012
- First flight: December 22, 1998

The Beechcraft Premier I is a light business jet aircraft designed and manufactured by the Beechcraft division of Hawker Beechcraft. It was the company's first in-house designed business jet.

Developed during the mid-to-late 1990s, the Premier I was designed to compete with the Cessna CitationJet series of aircraft. Its construction made use of both aluminium and composite materials; while the manufacturing approach for the airframe reduced production time, the overall aircraft was somewhat overweight compared to the programme's original goals. Upon its receipt of type certification in March 2001, the Premier I was both the fastest and most spacious aircraft in the light jet niche of the market. In 2006, an improved model of the aircraft, the Premier IA, was introduced; it featured improved avionics, brakes, and cabin comfort. Two years later, work on the further improved Premier II was launched, however, development was paused in 2011 and formally terminated following the bankruptcy of Hawker Beechcraft in May 2012. While production of the type ended with the firm's bankruptcy and restructuring, existing Premiers continue to fly and receive support as well as aftermarket upgrades.

== Development ==
=== Premier I ===
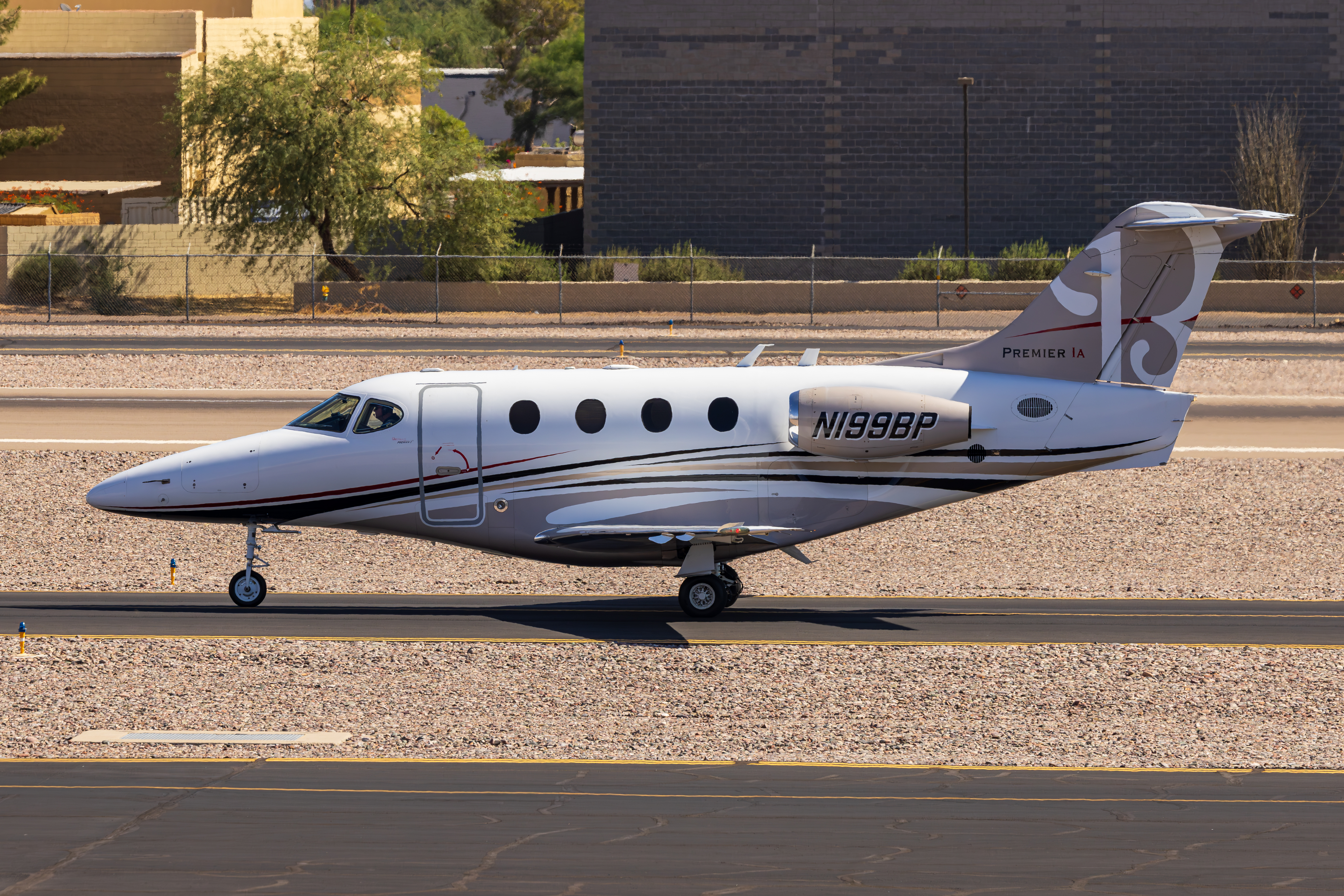
Beechcraft 390 Premier IA N199BP departing Scottsdale Airport, Arizona, October 2023

Design of the Premier I began early in 1994 under the designation PD-374 (PD stood for Preliminary Design), and development was authorized to continue early the following year. The aircraft was officially launched at the annual National Business Aviation Association Convention in September 1995 and construction of the first prototype commenced late in 1996. In the mid-1990s, the light jet was to be priced at $5 million.

The company decided that, in order to reduce cost, risk, and weight, the airframe's construction should use a combination of both aluminium and composite materials; furthermore, the fuselage manufacturing process involving these composites spurned labor-intensive hand lay-up techniques in favour of a computer-controlled fiber-placement machine process, which reportedly reduced the assembly manhours required to half of the Beechcraft King Air. However, by the end of its development, the Premier I weighed 12,500 lb, which was 1,500 lb more than had been originally intended.

On 19 August 1998, the Premier I prototype was rolled out; it performed its maiden flight on 22 December 1998; a total of four prototypes were used in the flight test program. On 23 March 2001, the aircraft's type certificate was issued by the Federal Aviation Administration. This permitted the Premier I to enter service in 2001; however, early operations were allegedly afflicted by instances of poor runway performance, erratic spoiler and brakes, a relatively noisy cabin and a substandard cockpit. Many of these performance issues would be subsequently rectified.

In 2006, the aircraft was upgraded into the Premier IA, which featured improvements to the brakes, avionics and cabin; 163 aircraft were produced over a five year period. It was certified on 22 September 2005.

=== Premier II/Hawker 200 ===
On 19 May 2008, Hawker Beechcraft announced the launch of the Premier II. Based on the preceding Premier IA, this new derivative would feature higher cruise speeds, a 20 percent longer range with four passengers, as well as an increased payload capacity. The aircraft would continue to feature composite materials in the construction of its fuselage and be equipped with more powerful engines along with new winglets to achieve performance improvements over the previous model. Its first flight was scheduled for April 2009 while FAA certification was anticipated to occur during the first half of 2010. Hawker Beechcraft claimed to have received orders for over 70 new Premier IIs.

On 31 August 2009, the company indicated that it was slowing the development of the Premier II, moving its first delivery date into late 2012 or early 2013 due to the poor market for business aircraft. Company Chairman and CEO Bill Boisture stated: "While we remain fully committed to certifying and fielding the class-leading Premier II as designed, we must be prudent in our evaluation of the current and forecasted global economic environment. Based on these conditions, we have made the decision to extend the entry-into-service date to better align with the anticipated rebound of the business jet market."

In October 2010, Hawker Beechcraft announced that the Premier II had rebranded and upgraded as the Hawker 200. In December 2011, the company announced that it was slowing down the development of the Hawker 200 jet due to the uncertain state of the economy. Speaking at the time, CEO Bill Boisture indicated the program had not been cancelled, stating that the aircraft program was "well positioned to continue...when the time is right."

As a result of the bankruptcy of Hawker Beechcraft in May 2012 and its subsequent restructuring, the production of all business jets permanently ceased in 2013. This events, coupled with the wider downturn in demand for business jets amid the Great Recession, dimmed the prospects for a potential revival of production.

== Design ==
In terms of its general configuration, the Beechcraft Premier I features a cantilever low-mounted swept wing, pressurized cabin, and a T-tail. Both the fin and horizontal stabilizers of the tail are swept. Its airfoil is fitted with slotted Fowler flaps than spans 75 percent of the wing's trailing edge and can achieve a 30 percent laminar flow. While the wing is composed of traditional aluminium, the fuselage is constructed with a high-strength composite, carbon fiber/epoxy honeycomb structure fuselage.

The landing gear comprise relatively short-travel straight legs. The powerplants are Williams International FJ44-2A engines. A single fire extinguisher bottle is incorporated to respond to an engine fire. The aircraft's hydraulic system, which operates at 3,000 psi, is used actuate the spoilerons, landing gear, and wheel brakes. These brakes incorporate an anti-skid system and differed considerably between the Premier I and IA; the former used actuating cables while the latter switched to a master cylinder approach, which lessened the impact on the aircraft's occupants.

The cabin of the Premier is similar in terms of width to the competing Citation Excel with 3 in (76 mm) however, it provided noticeably less headroom. In a standard configuration, the cabin was arranged in a four-seat club plus two aft chairs arrangement, providing seating with a length of 11.2 ft (3.4 m), similar to a CJ2. Amenities in the cabin include a refreshment centre in the forward area and an enclosed full-width lavatory. Baggage is stowed in two separate compartment, one is housed within the aircraft's nose while the rear compartment (which was heated) was located in the aft fuselage section. A redesigned cabin interior was adopted for the Premier 1A; amongst other improvements, it featured superior sound insulation, more comfortable chairs, greater headroom and increased legroom for the rear seats.

In terms of performance, the Premier can fly four passengers over 1,105 or 1,365 nmi (2,046 or 2,528 km) with two passengers and can take off within 3,792 ft (1,156 m) at ISA temperatures and sea-level. The type's basic operating weight is typically around 8,400 lb (3,800 kg), leaving 570 lb (260 kg) for the payload at full tanks. The Premier 1A has a Mach 0.8 MMo, 451 kn (835 km/h) cruise at FL310 and a 817 lb (371 kg)/h fuel burn at 424 kn (785 km/h) and midweight. The Premier possessed favourable handling characteristics, the flight controls being both responsive and relatively crisp. However, a somewhat demanding check of the aircraft spoilers is necessary prior to taxiing.

Both the Premier I and IA can be certified as light aircraft for operation by a single pilot. Various avionics are fitted to the aircraft. Instead of an engine-indicating and crew-alerting system, the pilot is required to use an annunciator panel. The TDR-94 transponders originally fitted to the Premier are not compliant with the ADS-B requirement; aftermarket upgrades are available to achieve compliance. On the Premier IA, numerous upgrades were enacted; including the installation of dual primary flight displays, integration of a integrated flight information system (IFIS) compatible with electronic charts and weather map overlays, and TCAS II.

== Variants ==
Premier I
basic version, introduced in 2001.
Premier IA
new cabin interior and improved systems, introduced in 2005.
Premier II/Hawker 200
abandoned improved model with more powerful Williams International FJ44-3AP engines and winglets.

== Specifications (Premier IA) ==
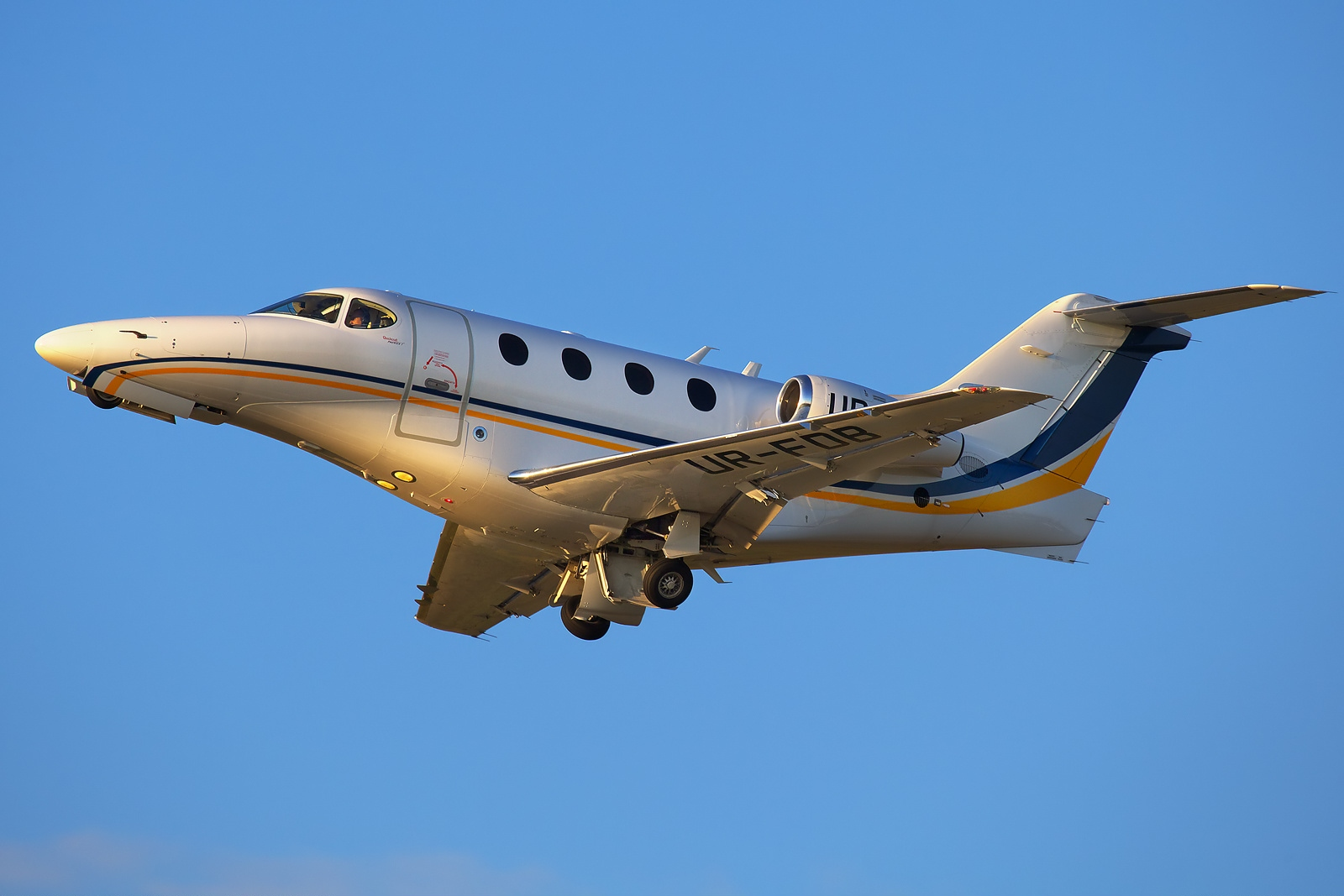
Premier IA climbing

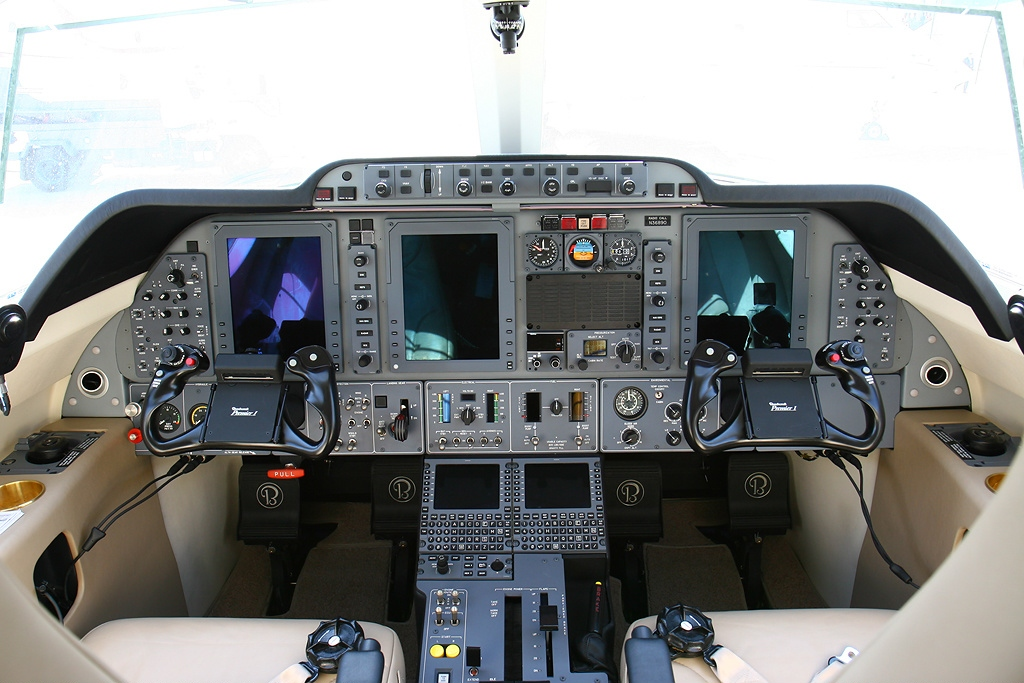
Premier IA cockpit

Data from Hawker Beechcraft

General characteristics

- Crew: 1
- Capacity: 6 / 7
- Length: 46 ft 0 in (14.02 m)
- Wingspan: 44 ft 6 in (13.56 m)
- Height: 15 ft 4 in (4.67 m)
- Wing area: 246 sq ft (22.9 m^{2})
- Aspect ratio: 8.03
- Empty weight: 8,600 lb (3,901 kg) Basic Operating
- Max takeoff weight: 12,500 lb (5,670 kg)
- Fuel capacity: 3,670 lb / 1,665 kg
- Max Payload: 1,400 lb / 635 kg
- Cabin Length × Width × Height: 13 ft 6 in × 5 ft 6 in × 5 ft 5 in (4.11 × 1.68 × 1.65 m)
- Hold: 76.9 cu. ft / 2.2 cu. m
- Powerplant: 2 × Williams FJ44-2A Turbofan, 2,300 lbf (10.23 kN) thrust each

Performance

- Maximum speed: 523 mph (841 km/h, 454 kn) maximum cruise
- Range: 950 mi (1,530 km, 830 nmi) maximum payload
- Ferry range: 1,710 mi (2,750 km, 1,480 nmi)
- Service ceiling: 41,000 ft (12,500 m)
- Wing loading: 50.6 lb/sq ft (247 kg/m^{2})
- Fuel consumption: 1.67 lb/mi (0.47 kg/km)
- Thrust/weight: 0.37
- Take-off (MTOW): 3,792 ft / 1,156 m
- Landing (MLW): 3,177 ft / 968 m

Avionics

- Collins Pro Line 21

== Incidents and accidents ==
On 17 August 2023, a private Raytheon 390 Premier I became uncontrollable on final approach to Kuala Lumpur-Subang-Sultan Abdul Aziz Shah Airport runway 15 and crashed 5 kilometres short of the runway threshold, subsequently bursting into flames. A total of ten people were killed including Malaysian politician Datuk Johari Harun.

== See also ==
Aircraft of comparable role, configuration, and era

- Bombardier Learjet 40/Bombardier Learjet 45
- Cessna CitationJet
- Embraer Phenom 300
- SyberJet SJ30
- Grob G180 SPn
