= Order of precedence in Pahang =

Relative preeminence of officials for ceremonial purposes

The Pahang order of precedence is a nominal and symbolic hierarchy of important positions within the state of Pahang. It has no legal standing but is used to dictate ceremonial protocol at events of a state nature.

== See also ==
- List of post-nominal letters (Pahang)
