= Jalaluddin Abdul Rahman =

Retired Malaysia police officer

CP Dato' Sri Jalaluddin bin Abdul Rahman (born 28 December 1956 (age 69)) is a retired Malaysian police officer.

== Police career ==
Jalaluddin Abdul Rahman started his career in the Police Force as Probationary Inspector on 1 October 1977. During his career, he previously served as Commander of the Marine Police Force, Bukit Aman on 21 June 2006, Kelantan Police Chief in 2011, and Sabah Police Commissioner in 2014. Lastly, he was appointed as Director of Bukit Aman Integrity and Standards Compliance Department on 21 June 2016. He was retired on 27 December 2016.

== Honours ==
- Malaysia :
  - Companion of the Order of the Defender of the Realm (JMN) (2015)
  - Companion of the Order of Loyalty to the Crown of Malaysia (JSM) (2013)
  - Officer of the Order of the Defender of the Realm (KMN) (2004)
- Royal Malaysia Police :
  - Courageous Commander of The Most Gallant Police Order (PGPP) (2016)
- Kelantan
  - Knight Commander of the Order of the Loyalty to the Crown of Kelantan (DPSK) – Dato’ (2012)
  - Knight Commander of the Order of the Services to the Crown of Kelantan (DPJK) – Dato’ (2016)
- Pahang :
  - Knight Grand Companion of the Order of Sultan Ahmad Shah of Pahang (SSAP) – Dato' Sri (2016)
  - Member of the Order of Sultan Ahmad Shah of Pahang (AAP) (2005)
