= Grand Royal Order of Sultan Ahmad Shah of Pahang =

Chivalric order of Pahang

Grand Royal Order of Sultan Ahmad Shah of Pahang Darjah Sri Diraja Sultan Ahmad Shah Pahang

Awarded by Sultan of Pahang
- Type: Order of chivalry
- Established: 23 October 2010
- Status: Currently constituted
- Founder: Sultan Ahmad Shah
- Grand Master: Sultan Abdullah
- Grades: Grand Recipient (SDSA)
- Post-nominals: S.D.S.A.

Statistics
- First induction: 2010
- Last induction: 2024
- Total inductees: 2

Precedence
- Next (higher): Order of Al-Sultan Abdullah of Pahang
- Next (lower): Order of Sultan Ahmad Shah of Pahang
- Ribbon bar

The Grand Royal Order of Sultan Ahmad Shah of Pahang (Malay: Darjah Sri Diraja Sultan Ahmad Shah Pahang) is the fourth highest order of chivalry of the state of Pahang which was constituted by Sultan Ahmad Shah of Pahang on 23 October 2010 in conjunction with his 80th birthday anniversary. The order ranked below the Order of Al-Sultan Abdullah of Pahang and above the Order of Sultan Ahmad Shah of Pahang.

== Classes ==
The Grand Recipient of the Order of Sultan Ahmad Shah of Pahang is conferred in the single class of "Grand Recipient". The recipients are entitled to bear the prenominal title of "Dato' Sri Diraja" and use the post-nominal letters of "S.D.S.A.".

== Recipients ==
=== Grand Recipients ===
- Adnan Yaakob (2010)
- Wan Rosdy Wan Ismail (2024)

== See also ==
- Orders, decorations, and medals of the Malaysian states and federal territories#Pahang
- Orders, decorations, and medals of Pahang
- List of post-nominal letters (Pahang)
