= 2023 Elmina Beechcraft 390 crash =

Aviation accident in Selangor, Malaysia

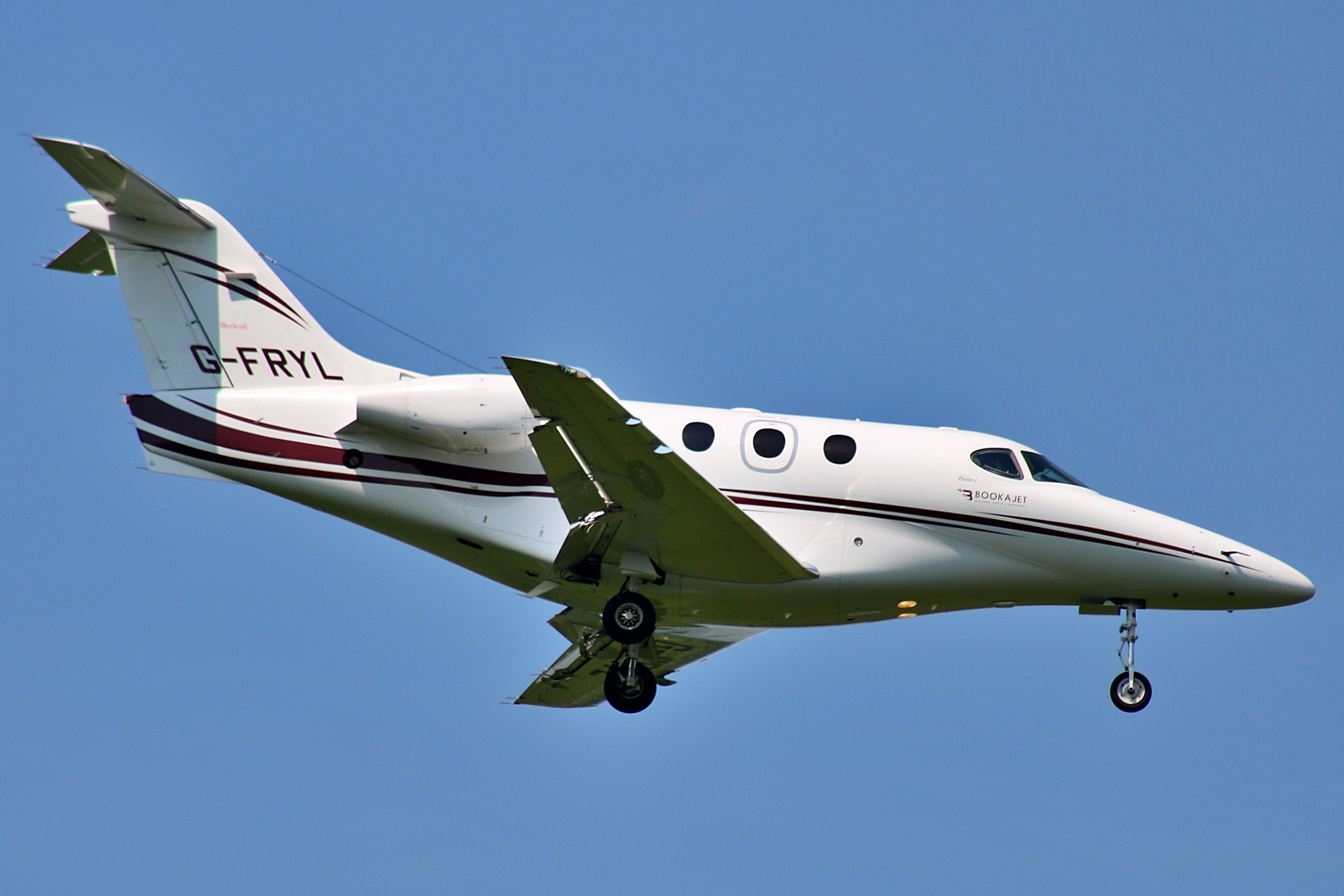
- The aircraft involved in the accident under a previous registration, G-FRYL in 2020

Accident
- Date: 17 August 2023
- Summary: Loss of control due to pilot error
- Site: Elmina, Sungai Buloh, Selangor, Malaysia; 03°10′52″N 101°30′53″E
- Total fatalities: 10
- Total survivors: 0

Aircraft
- Aircraft type: Beechcraft Model 390 (Model I)
- Operator: Jet Valet
- Call sign: NOVEMBER TWO EIGHT JULIET VICTOR
- Registration: N28JV
- Flight origin: Langkawi International Airport
- Destination: Sultan Abdul Aziz Shah Airport
- Occupants: 8
- Passengers: 6
- Crew: 2
- Fatalities: 8
- Survivors: 0

Ground casualties
- Ground fatalities: 2

On 17 August 2023, a Beechcraft 390 Premier I business jet crashed onto an expressway interchange near Elmina in Sungai Buloh, Selangor, Malaysia, killing 10 people. The aircraft was travelling from Langkawi International Airport to Sultan Abdul Aziz Shah Airport when it crashed two minutes prior to landing.

== Background ==
The aircraft was a Beechcraft 390 Premier I built in 2004 and was first registered as G-FRYL in the United Kingdom. In May 2023, the aircraft entered service with Jet Valet, a private flight service based in Kuala Lumpur, and was given a new registration of N28JV.

The aircraft carried six passengers and two pilots. The pilots were 41-year-old Captain Shahrul Kamal Roslan and 44-year-old First Officer Heikal Aras Abdul Azim. Captain Shahrul Kamal had just over 6,275 hours of flight time, including less than 37 hours on the type of aircraft involved in the accident, while First Officer Heikal Aras had 9,298 hours of flight time, including just over 3 hours on the Beechcraft 390 Premier I aircraft.

Among the passengers was Johari Harun, a member of the Pahang State Executive Council and a member of the Pahang State Legislative Assembly for Pelangai.

Captain Shahrul Kamal previously worked for Etihad Airways, Malaysia Airlines and AirAsia while First Officer Heikal Aras Abdul Azim was a former pilot at the Royal Malaysian Air Force.

== Flight ==
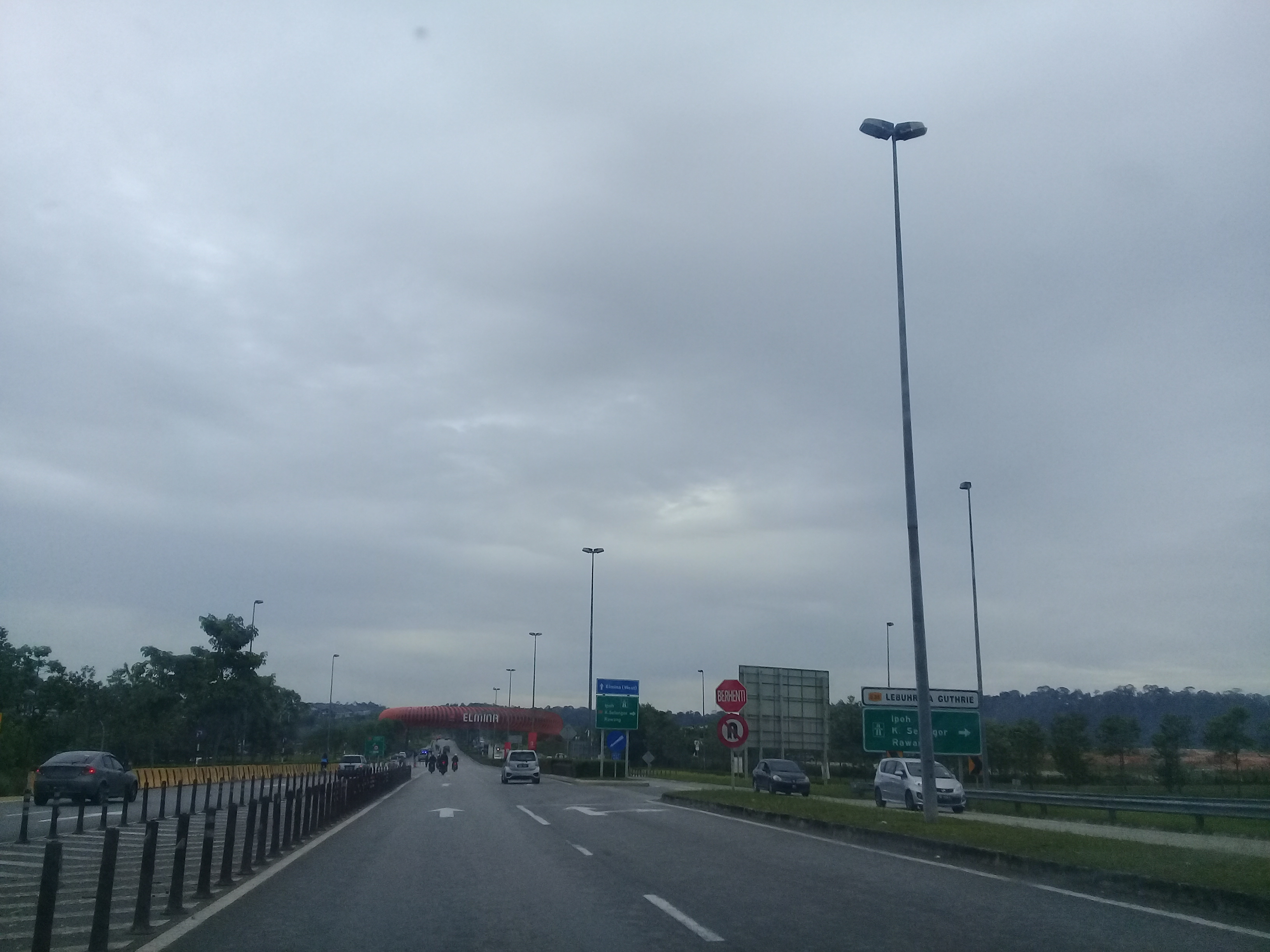
Plane crash site in 2021, Persiaran Elmina

The aircraft took off from Langkawi International Airport en route to Sultan Abdul Aziz Shah Airport at 2:08 pm MYT (06:08 UTC). At 2:47 pm, the aircraft made contact with the destination airport's air traffic control (ATC). A minute later, the ATC gave clearance for landing. However, at 2:51 pm, it sighted smoke plumes along the aircraft's flight path.

Eyewitnesses reported erratic flying movements from the aircraft before the crash. The aircraft banked to the right before descending sharply to the ground, exploding upon impact near the Elmina interchange of the Guthrie Corridor Expressway. The explosion killed a motorist, while a motorcyclist caught on fire and died after attempts to extinguish the flames failed.

The aircraft struck the road surface at high speeds wing-first, quickly followed by the nose. It was completely destroyed on impact and engulfed by the post-crash fire. Momentum carried the aircraft wreckage forward; the main debris was located 73 m (240 ft) away from the initial impact zone. Additional wreckage and an occupant's body was found 100 m (330 ft) from the point of impact.

== Aftermath ==
=== Recovery operations ===
Disassembled cockpit voice recorder of the plane, on displayed during the 2026 Parliament Open Day.

Only one body was recovered intact among the ten casualties in the accident. Five bags of body parts were collected in the vicinity of the crash. Identification of the bodies involved 20 to 30 personnel from the Ministry of Health, who are also responsible for counselling services and emotional support for family members of the victims. The family members of all ten victims submitted their DNA samples to local police for identification purposes.

The cockpit voice recorder of the aircraft was retrieved from the crash site at 10:20 pm. It was sent to the laboratories of the Air Accident Investigation Bureau (AAIB) for analysis.

=== Reactions ===
The then Yang di-Pertuan Agong, Abdullah, and Prime Minister Anwar Ibrahim visited the crash site several hours later to assess the situation.

The Malaysian Communications and Multimedia Commission issued a statement advising against the online sharing of any form of videos and photographs of bodies near the crash site as they believed such distribution would offend the families of the victims and violate basic ethics. Similar statements were made by the Criminal Investigation Department in relation to several viral videos online.

Former Prime Minister of Malaysia, Mahathir Mohamad, shared his condolences on Facebook.

== Investigation ==
The AAIB found that the aircraft was not equipped with a flight data recorder, which is not uncommon among light aircraft of this type. The aircraft had veered off its original flight path prior to its fall, following the ATC's clearance for landing.

Police recorded statements from the owners of vehicles that were equipped with dashcams. A forensics unit was sent to gather evidence.

A preliminary accident report was released on 15 September 2023 by the Ministry of Transport. It stated the aircraft had a valid airworthiness certificate and maintained in accordance with regulations. Both pilots were described as certified to operate the flight. There was also no indication of incapacitation or physiological factors that impact the crews' behavior. Data from the cockpit voice recorder was successfully extracted but the transcript was not released. The report added that the early analysis of the data "has provided critical leads to uncovering the cause of the accident, with a focus on the aircraft flight control systems." The National Transportation Safety Board (NTSB) and the American aircraft component manufacturer also conducted an inspection and evaluation.

The final report was released on 16 August 2024. Investigators cited pilot error as the main cause of the crash, in which the pilots inadvertently deployed the aircraft's lift dump spoilers, resulting in a sudden loss of lift. The report also concluded that the pilots were in the wrong seats, with inadequate training and communication also being contributing factors to the crash.

== See also ==
- Japan Air Lines Flight 715, which crashed within the same area 46 years prior.
- 1976 Sabah Air GAF Nomad crash, which also stalled on approach.
- Flying Tiger Line Flight 066, which crashed while approaching the same destination airport, from the opposite end of the runway.
