= Orders, decorations, and medals of Pahang =

Honorific order of the Sultanate of Pahang

The following is a list of the orders, decorations, and medals given by the Sultan of Pahang, Malaysia. When applicable, post-nominal letters and non-hereditary titles are indicated.

== Order of precedence for the wearing of order insignias, decorations, and medals ==
Precedence:

1.
Darjah Kerabat
D.K.P.
--
Left shoulder
2.
Darjah Kerabat Sri Indra Mahkota Pahang Yang Amat Dihormati
D.K. I
--
Left shoulder
3.
Darjah Kerabat Sri Indera Mahkota Pahang Yang Amat Dihormati
D.K. II
--
4.
Sri Setia Al-Sultan Abdullah Ahmad Shah Pahang
S.A.A.S.
Dato' Sri Setia
5.
Sri Diraja Sultan Ahmad Shah Pahang
S.D.S.A.
Dato' Sri Diraja
6.
Sri Sultan Ahmad Shah Pahang
S.S.A.P.
Dato' Sri

7.
Sri Indera Mahkota Pahang
S.I.M.P.
Dato' Indera

8.
Darjah Al- Sultan Abdullah Ahmad Shah
D.S.A.S.

Dato'

9.
Darjah Sultan Ahmad Shah Pahang
D.S.A.P.

Dato'

10.
Darjah Indera Mahkota Pahang
D.I.M.P.
Dato'
11.
Setia Al-Sultan Abdullah Pahang
S.A.S.
--
12.
Setia Ahmad Shah Pahang
S.A.P.
--
13.
Setia Mahkota Pahang
S.M.P.
--
14.
Ahli Ahmad Shah Pahang
A.A.P.
--
15.
Ahli Mahkota Pahang
A.M.P.
--
16.
Pingat Khidmat Cemerlang
P.K.C.
--
17.
Pingat Gagah Perwira
P.G.P.
--
18.
Jaksa Pendamai
J.P.
--
19.
Pingat Kelakuan Terpuji
P.K.T.
--
20.
Pingat Jasa Kebaktian
P.J.K.
--
21.
Pingat Perkhidmatan Luar Biasa
P.P.B.
--

== Orders, decorations, and medals ==
The Most Illustrious Royal Family Order of Pahang - Darjah Kerabat Yang Maha Mulia Utama Kerabat Diraja Pahang

- Founded by Sultan Ahmad Shah on 24 October 1977.
- Awarded in one class, Royal Principal - (DKP)

The Most Esteemed Family Order of the Crown of Indra of Pahang - Darjah Kerabat Sri Indra Mahkota Pahang Yang Amat Dihormati

- Founded by Sultan Abu Bakar on 25 May 1967.
- Awarded in two classes :
  - 1. 1st class - (DK I)
  - 2. 2nd class - (DK II)

The Most Illustrious Order of Al-Sultan Abdullah of Pahang - Darjah Kebesaran Al-Sultan Abdullah Pahang Yang Amat Mulia

- Founded by Al-Sultan Abdullah on 30 July 2024.
- Awarded in two classes :
  - 1. Grand Companion - (SAAS)
  - 2. Companion - (DSAS)
  - 3. Officer - (SAS)

The Grand Royal Order of Sultan Ahmad Shah of Pahang - Darjah Sri Diraja Sultan Ahmad Shah Pahang

- Founded by Sultan Ahmad Shah on 23 October 2010 in commemoration of his eightieth birthday.
- Awarded in a single class, Grand Recipient - (SDSA)

The Most Illustrious Order of Sultan Ahmad Shah of Pahang - Darjah Kebesaran Sri Sultan Ahmad Shah Pahang Yang Amat Mulia

- Founded by Sultan Ahmad Shah on 24 October 1977.
- Awarded in four classes :
  - 1. Grand Companion - (SSAP)
  - 2. Companion - (DSAP)
  - 3. Officer - (SAP)
  - 4. Member - (AAP)

The Esteemed Order of the Crown of Pahang - Darjah Kebesaran Mahkota Pahang Yang Dihormati

- Founded by Sultan Abu Bakar on 27 December 1968.
- Awarded in four classes :
  - 1. Grand Companion - (SIMP)
  - 2. Companion (DIMP)
  - 3. Officer - (SMP)
  - 4. Member - (AMP)

Gallantry Medal - Pingat Gagah Perwira

- Instituted by Sultan Abu Bakar on 17 October 1951 to reward conspicuous acts of gallantry of the highest order.
- Awarded in a single class, a silver medal - P.G.P.

Distinguished Service Medal - Pingat Khidmat Cemerlang

- Instituted by Sultan Ahmad Shah on 20 October 1985 as a reward for long and distinguished services to the state.
- Awarded in a single class, a silver medal - P.K.C.

Distinguished Conduct Medal - Pingat Kelakuan Terpuji

- Instituted by Sultan Abu Bakar on 17 October 1951 as a reward for distinguished conduct in the service of the state.
- Awarded in a single class, a bronze medal - P.K.T.

Meritorious Service Medal - Pingat Jasa Kebaktian

- Instituted by Sultan Abu Bakar on 17 October 1951 as a reward for long and meritorious services to the state.
- Awarded in a single class, a bronze medal - P.J.K.

Silver Jubilee Medal - Pingat Jubli Perak Pahang

- Instituted by Sultan Abu Bakar on 29 May 1957 in commemoration of his twenty-five years as sultan.
- Awarded in a single class, a silver medal - P.J.P.

Silver Jubilee Medal - Pingat Jubli Perak Pahang

- Instituted by Sultan Ahmad Shah in 1999 to commemorate his twenty-five years as sultan.
- Awarded in a single class, a silver medal - P.J.P.

Sultan Haji Ahmad Shah Installation Medal - Pingat Pertabalan Sultan Haji Ahmad Shah

- Instituted to commemorate the installation of the Sultan of Pahang, Sultan Ahmad Shah, as the seventh Yang di-Pertuan Agong on 10 July 1980.
- Awarded in three classes of medals, gold, silver and bronze.

== See also ==
- Orders, decorations, and medals of the Malaysian states and federal territories#Pahang
- List of post-nominal letters (Pahang)
- Orang Kaya Indera Shahbandar
