= Spoiler (aeronautics) =

Device for reducing lift and increasing drag on aircraft wings

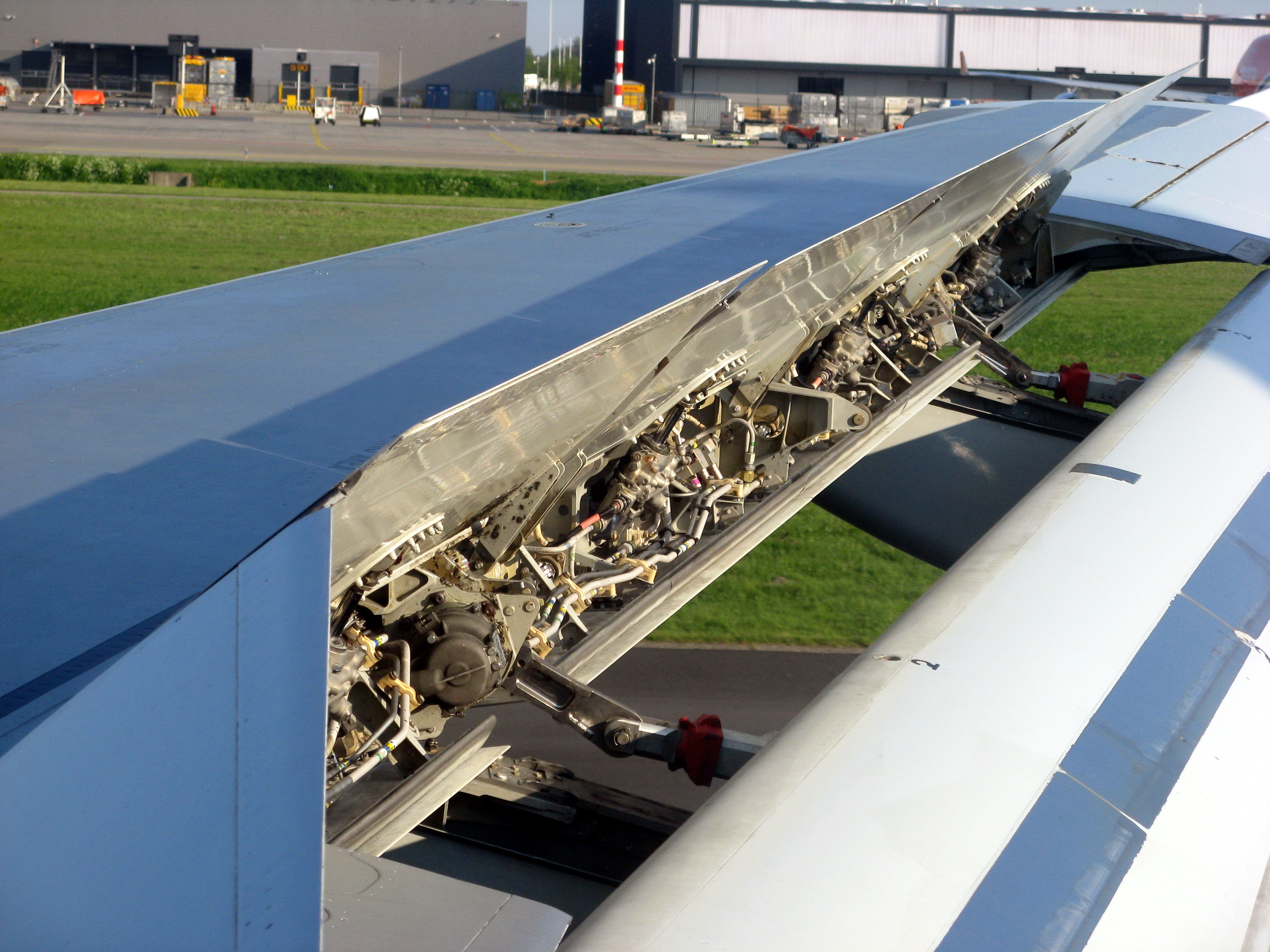
The inner workings of spoilers in lift dump deployment during the landing of an Airbus A320

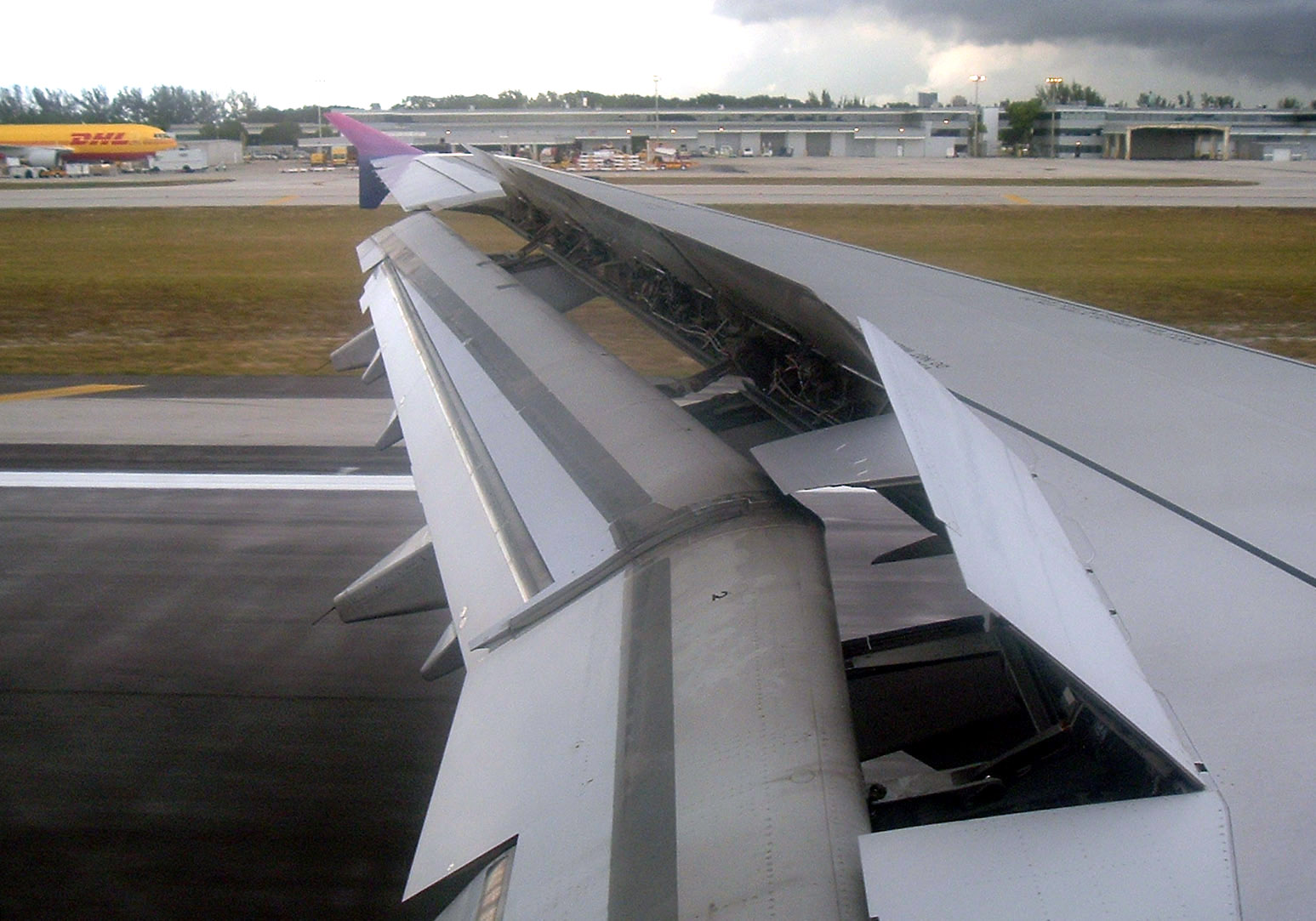
A spoiler (the parts of the wing that are raised up) during the landing of an Airbus A321

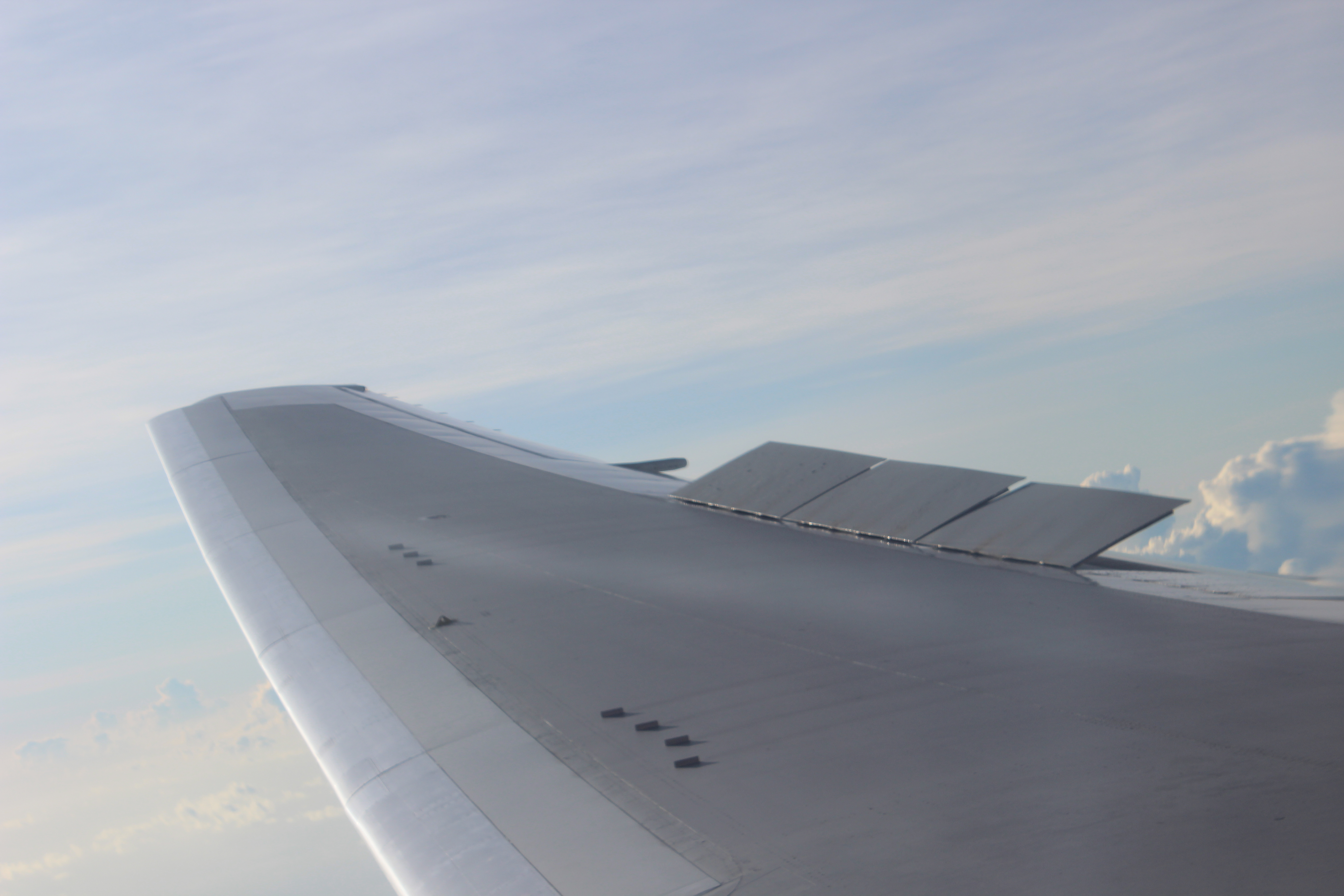
The right wing of a Boeing 767-300ER during descent with spoilers partially deployed

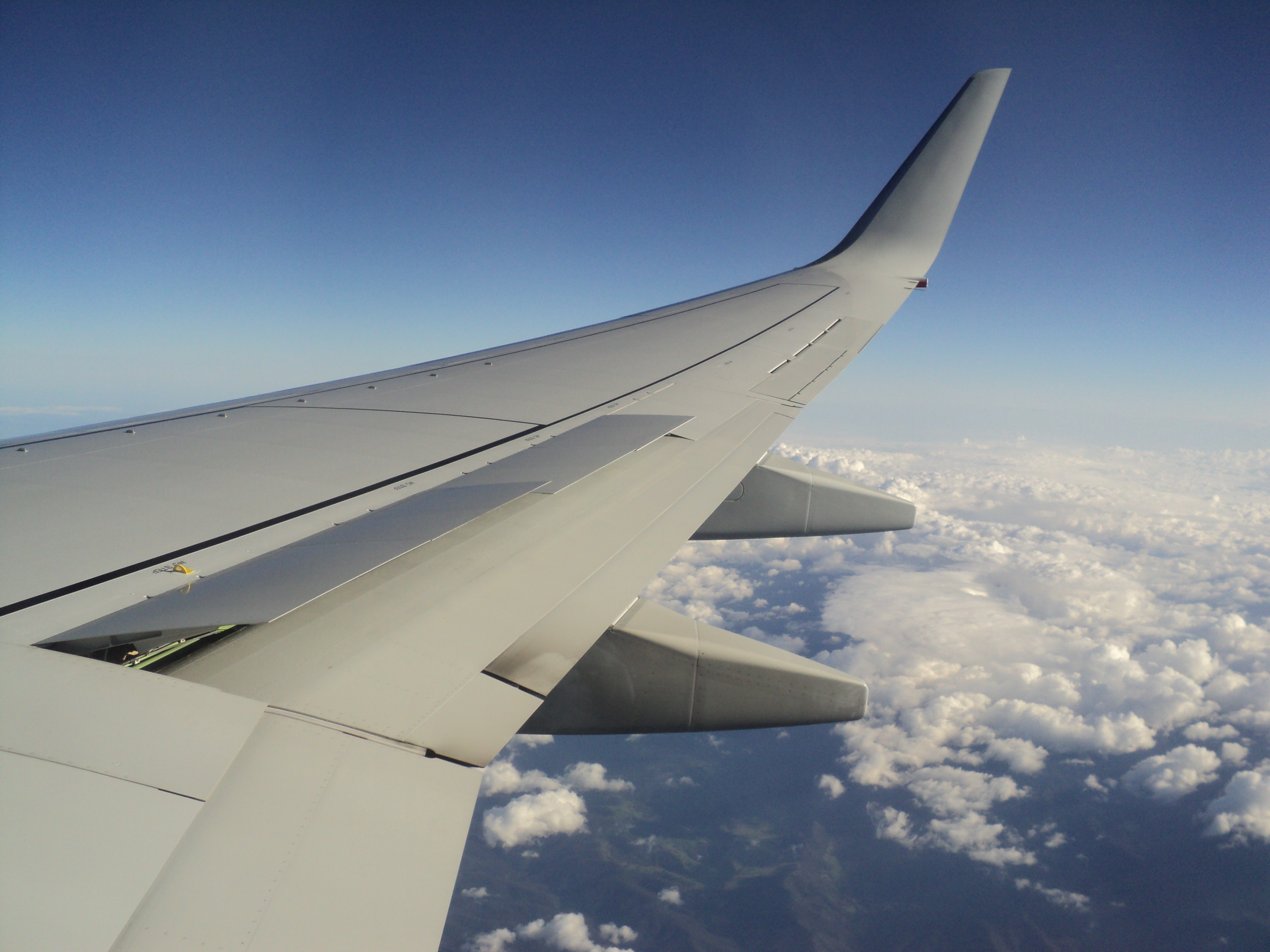
Spoilers deployed to slow down for descent on a Qantas Boeing 737-800

In aeronautics, a spoiler (sometimes called a lift spoiler or lift dumper) is a device which increases the drag and decreases the lift of an airfoil in a controlled way. Most often, spoilers are hinged plates on the top surface of a wing that can be extended upward into the airflow to spoil the streamline flow. By so doing, the spoiler creates a controlled stall over the portion of the wing behind it, greatly reducing the lift of that wing section.

Spoilers differ from airbrakes in that airbrakes are designed to increase drag without disrupting the lift distribution across the wing span, while spoilers disrupt the lift distribution as well as increasing drag. However, flight spoilers are routinely referred to as "speed brakes" on transport aircraft by pilots and manufacturers, despite significantly reducing lift.

Spoilers fall into two categories: those that are deployed at controlled angles during flight to increase descent rate ("flight spoilers") or control roll ("spoilerons"), and those that are fully deployed immediately on landing to greatly reduce lift and increase drag ("ground spoilers"). In modern fly-by-wire aircraft, the same set of control surfaces can serve both functions ("multifunction spoilers").

Spoilers were used by most gliders (sailplanes) until the 1960s to control their rate of descent and thus achieve a controlled landing. Since then, spoilers on gliders have almost entirely been replaced by airbrakes, usually of the Schempp-Hirth type. Spoilers and airbrakes enable the glide angle to be altered during the approach while leaving the speed unchanged.

Airliners are commonly fitted with spoilers. Spoilers are used to increase descent rate without increasing speed. Spoilers may also be differentially operated for roll control as spoilerons in place of ailerons; Martin Aircraft was the first company to develop such spoilers in 1948. On landing the spoilers are usually fully deployed to help slow the aircraft: the increase in form drag created by the spoilers provides a braking effect. The spoilers also cause a significant loss of lift so that there is more weight acting on the landing gear, allowing more braking to be used without skidding.

In air-cooled piston engine aircraft, spoilers may be needed to avoid shock cooling the engines. In a descent without spoilers, air speed is increased and the engine will be at low power, producing less heat than normal. The engine may cool too rapidly, resulting in stuck valves, cracked cylinders or other problems. Spoilers alleviate the situation by allowing the aircraft to descend at a desired rate while letting the engine run at a power setting that keeps it from cooling too quickly (especially true for turbocharged piston engines, which generate higher temperatures than normally aspirated engines).

== Spoiler controls ==
Spoiler controls can be used for roll control (outboard or mid-span spoilers) or descent control (inboard spoilers).

Some aircraft use spoilers in combination with or in lieu of ailerons for roll control, primarily to reduce adverse yaw when rudder input is limited by higher speeds. For such spoilers the term spoileron has been coined. In the case of a spoileron, in order for it to be used as a control surface, it is raised on one wing only, thus decreasing lift and increasing drag, causing roll and yaw. Eliminating dedicated ailerons also avoids the problem of control reversal and allows flaps to occupy a greater portion of the wing trailing edge.

Almost all modern jet airliners are fitted with inboard lift spoilers which are used together during descent to increase the rate of descent and control speed. Some aircraft use lift spoilers on landing approach to control descent without changing the aircraft's attitude.

One jet airliner not fitted with lift spoilers was the Douglas DC-8 which used reverse thrust in flight on the two inboard engines to control descent speed (however the aircraft was fitted with lift dumpers). The Lockheed Tristar was fitted with a system called Direct Lift Control that used the spoilers on landing approach to control descent.

Airbus aircraft with fly-by-wire control utilise wide-span spoilers for descent control, spoilerons, gust alleviation, and lift dumpers. Especially on landing approach, the full width of spoilers can be seen controlling the aircraft's descent rate and bank.

== Ground spoilers ==
Ground spoilers, sometimes called lift dumpers informally, are a special type of spoiler designed to reduce wing lift on landing, differentiated from flight spoilers by having only two positions: deployed and retracted. The spoilers have three main functions: increasing the weight acting the landing gear for maximum braking effect, increasing form drag, and preventing aircraft "bounce" on landing.

Ground spoilers usually deploy automatically on touch down, with the flight spoilers also raised to increase the effect.

Virtually all modern jet aircraft are fitted with ground spoilers. The British Aerospace 146 is fitted with particularly wide-span spoilers to generate additional drag and make reverse thrust unnecessary.

A number of accidents have been caused either by inadvertently deploying ground spoilers on landing approach, or forgetting to set them to "automatic".

== Incidents and accidents ==
- Air Canada Flight 621 – Premature deployment of the spoilers at low altitude contributed to this crash in Toronto on 5 July 1970.
- United Airlines Flight 553 – Forgetting to deactivate the spoilers contributed to crash at Chicago Midway International Airport on 8 December 1972.
- Loftleiðir Icelandic Airlines Flight 509 – Deployment of lift dumpers while attempting to arm them 40 feet above the runway caused this accident at John F. Kennedy International Airport on 23 June 1973.
- American Airlines Flight 965 – Forgetting to deactivate the spoilers while climbing to avoid a mountain contributed to this crash on 20 December 1995.
- American Airlines Flight 1420 – Forgetting to deploy the spoilers contributed to this crash at Little Rock National Airport on 1 June 1999.
- Atlantic Airways Flight 670 – The spoilers did not deploy during landing on a fairly short wet runway, causing overrun and falling over a cliff, on 10 October 2006.
- TAM Airlines Flight 3054 – This Airbus A320's pilots were aware of their deactivated starboard engine #2 thrust reverser, and so apparently did not attempt to use it to brake when attempting to land at São Paulo's Congonhas Airport on 17 July 2007; under one theory of the cause, they used an old procedure, which reduced the required runway length for landing but was superseded because it invited pilot error, which required them to leave the engine in idle rather than reverse thrust, and mistakenly left the engine at full power. The plane's spoilers may have been their only method of braking at speed. The plane slid off the runway, over a major highway, and ploughed into a warehouse, killing all 186 on board as well as several on the ground. It was Brazil's worst aviation disaster.
- 2023 Elmina Beechcraft 390 crash – Inadvertent deployment of spoilers of a Beechcraft 390 Premier I business jet while attempting to arm them before landing, resulting in a sudden loss of lift and subsequent crash in Sungai Buloh, Selangor, Malaysia, on 17 August 2023.

== See also ==
- Air brake (aircraft)
