= Muadzam Shah (state constituency) =

Political subdivision in Malaysia

Muadzam Shah (N41)
Pahang constituency

State constituency
- Legislature: Pahang State Legislative Assembly
MLA
Razali Kassim
BN
- Constituency created: 1994
- First contested: 1995
- Last contested: 2022

Demographics
- Electors (2022): 29,663

Muadzam Shah is a state constituency in Pahang, Malaysia that is represented in the Pahang State Legislative Assembly.

== Demographics ==
Ethnic breakdown of Muadzam Shah's electorate as of 2022
1. Malay (79.7%)
2. Other ethnicities (18.5%)
3. Indian (1.18%)
4. Chinese (0.64%)

== History ==
=== Polling districts ===
According to the federal gazette issued on 31 October 2022, the Rompin constituency is divided into 38 polling districts.

State constituency	Polling district	Code	Location
Muadzam Shah（N41）	Muadzam Shah	091/41/01	SK Bukit Ridan
Muadzam Shah（N41）	Bukit Ridan	091/41/02	Dewan Stesen MARDI Muadzam Shah
Muadzam Shah（N41）	FELDA Keratong 10	091/41/03	SK LKTP Keratong 10
Muadzam Shah（N41）	FELDA Keratong 9	091/41/04	SK Perantau Damai
Muadzam Shah（N41）	FELDA Keratong 8	091/41/05	SK LKTP Keratong 8
Muadzam Shah（N41）	Kedaik	091/41/06	SK Kedaik
Muadzam Shah（N41）	Gading	091/41/07	Balai Raya Kampung Gading; Tadika KEMAS / JAKOA Kampung Kerpal
Muadzam Shah（N41）	Leban Chondong	091/41/08	SK Leban Chondong
Muadzam Shah（N41）	FELDA Keratong 6	091/41/09	SK LKTP Keratong 6
Muadzam Shah（N41）	Chenderawasih	091/41/10	SK Chenderawasih
Muadzam Shah（N41）	FELDA Selancar	091/41/11	SK LKTP Selancar 2
Muadzam Shah（N41）	FELDA Selancar 3	091/41/12	SK LKTP Selancar 3

=== Representation history ===
Members of the Legislative Assembly for Muadzam Shah
Assembly	No	Years	Name	Party
Constituency created from Bukit Ibam and Tioman
9th	N37	1995-1999	Maznah Mazlan	BN (UMNO)
10th	N37	1999-2004	Maznah Mazlan	BN (UMNO)
11th	N41	2004-2008	Maznah Mazlan	BN (UMNO)
12th	N41	2008-2013	Maznah Mazlan	BN (UMNO)
13th	N41	2013-2018	Maznah Mazlan	BN (UMNO)
14th	N41	2018-2022	Razali Kassim	BN (UMNO)
15th	N41	2022–present	Razali Kassim	BN (UMNO)

== Election results ==
Pahang state election, 2022
Party	Candidate	Votes	%	∆%
BN	Razali Kassim	10,990	49.35	▼7.04
PN	Jaafar Mustaffa	9,756	43.81	▲43.81
PH	Norlaily Forizad	1,523	6.84	▲6.84
Total valid votes		22,269	100.00	
Total rejected ballots		409		
Unreturned ballots		55		
Turnout		22,733	76.64	▼5.13
Registered electors		29,663		
Majority		1,234	5.54	▼24.52
BN hold		Swing		

Pahang state election, 2018
Party	Candidate	Votes	%	∆%
BN	Razali Kassim	9,081	56.39	▼16.61
PAS	Ramli Awang Ahmat	4,241	26.34	▲26.34
PKR	Osman A.Bakar	2,781	17.27	▼9.73
Total valid votes		16,103	100.00	
Total rejected ballots		338		
Unreturned ballots		80		
Turnout		16,521	81.76	▼4.44
Registered electors		20,206		
Majority		4,840	30.06	▼15.94
BN hold		Swing		

Pahang state election, 2013
Party	Candidate	Votes	%	∆%
BN	Maznah Mazlan	10,639	73.00	▲5.12
PKR	Muhamad Nordin Pa'Wan Chik	3,935	27.00	▼5.12
Total valid votes		14,574	100.00	
Total rejected ballots		399		
Unreturned ballots		34		
Turnout		15,007	86.20	▲6.58
Registered electors		17,409		
Majority		6,704	46.00	▲10.23
BN hold		Swing		

Pahang state election, 2008
Party	Candidate	Votes	%	∆%
BN	Maznah Mazlan	6,681	67.88	▼0.07
PKR	Rabidin Kasmawi	3,161	32.12	▲0.07
Total valid votes		9,842	100.00	
Total rejected ballots		282		
Unreturned ballots		21		
Turnout		10,145	79.62	▼0.20
Registered electors		12,741		
Majority		3,520	35.77	▼0.15
BN hold		Swing		

Pahang state election, 2004
Party	Candidate	Votes	%	∆%
BN	Maznah Mazlan	6,114	67.96	▲3.71
PKR	Long Jidin	2,883	32.04	▲32.04
Total valid votes		8,997	100.00	
Total rejected ballots		288		
Unreturned ballots		15		
Turnout		9,300	79.82	▲1.05
Registered electors		11,651		
Majority		3,231	35.91	▲7.42
BN hold		Swing		

Pahang state election, 1999
Party	Candidate	Votes	%	∆%
BN	Maznah Mazlan	5,200	64.25	▼16.74
PKR	Abd. Kadir Raman Sharif	2,894	35.75	▲35.75
Total valid votes		8,094	100.00	
Total rejected ballots		334		
Unreturned ballots		16		
Turnout		8,444	78.77	▲1.12
Registered electors		10,720		
Majority		2,306	28.49	▼33.48
BN hold		Swing		

Pahang state election, 1995
Party	Candidate	Votes	%
BN	Maznah Mazlan	6,397	80.98
S46	Abdul Rahim Sulaiman	1,502	19.02
Total valid votes		7,899	100.00
Total rejected ballots		238	
Unreturned ballots		38	
Turnout		8,175	77.65
Registered electors		10,528	
Majority		4,895	61.97
This was a new constituency created.
