= Razali Kassim =

Malaysian politician

Yang Berhormat Dato' Razali Kassim DIMP MLA

Member of the Pahang State Executive Council
- Incumbent
- Assumed office 14 February 2024 (Public Works, Transportation and Health)
- Monarch: Abdullah
- Menteri Besar: Wan Rosdy Wan Ismail
- In office 2 December 2022 – 14 February 2024 (FELDA Affairs, Cooperative and Entrepreneur Development)
- Monarch: Abdullah
- Menteri Besar: Wan Rosdy Wan Ismail

Member of the Pahang State Legislative Assembly for Muadzam Shah
- Incumbent
- Assumed office 9 May 2018
- Preceded by: Maznah Mazlan (BN–UMNO)
- Majority: 4,840 (2018); 1,234 (2022)

Personal details
- Party: United Malays National Organisation (UMNO)
- Other political affiliations: Barisan Nasional (BN)
- Occupation: Politician

Razali bin Kassim is a Malaysian politician and engineer who served as Member of the Pahang State Executive Council (EXCO) in the Barisan Nasional (BN) state administration under Menteri Besar Wan Rosdy Wan Ismail since 2024 as well as Member of the Pahang State Legislative Assembly (MLA) for Muadzam Shah since May 2018. He is a member of United Malays National Organisation (UMNO), a component party of Barisan Nasional (BN). At the party level, he is the Secretary of the UMNO of Pahang.

== Election results ==
Pahang State Legislative Assembly
| Year | Constituency | Candidate | Votes | Pct | Opponent(s) | Votes | Pct | Ballots cast | Majority | Turnout |
|---|---|---|---|---|---|---|---|---|---|---|
| 2018 | N41 Muadzam Shah | Razali Kassim (UMNO) | 9,081 | 56.39% | Ramli Awang Ahmat (PAS) | 4,241 | 26.34% | 16,521 | 4,840 | 81.76% |
| 2018 | N41 Muadzam Shah | Razali Kassim (UMNO) | 9,081 | 56.39% | Osman A Bakar (BERSATU) | 2,781 | 17.27% | 16,521 | 4,840 | 81.76% |
| 2022 | N41 Muadzam Shah | Razali Kassim (UMNO) | 10,990 | 49.35% | Jaafar Mustaffa (BERSATU) | 9,756 | 43.81% | 22,678 | 1,234 | 76.45% |
| 2022 | N41 Muadzam Shah | Razali Kassim (UMNO) | 10,990 | 49.35% | Norlaily Forizad (PKR) | 1,523 | 6.84% | 22,678 | 1,234 | 76.45% |

== Honours ==
- Pahang
  - Knight Companion of the Order of the Crown of Pahang (DIMP) – Dato' (2024)
