= Order of Sultan Ahmad Shah of Pahang =

Knighthood order of the Sultanate of Pahang

Order of Sultan Ahmad Shah of Pahang Darjah Kebesaran Sultan Ahmad Shah Pahang

Awarded by Sultan of Pahang
- Type: Order
- Founded: 24 October 1977
- Status: Currently constituted
- Founder: Sultan Haji Ahmad Shah Al-Musta’in Billah
- Sovereign: Al-Sultan Abdullah Ri'ayatuddin Al-Mustafa Billah Shah
- Grades: Grand Companion (SSAP); Companion (DSAP); Officer (SAP); Member (AAP)
- Post-nominals: S.S.A.P.; D.S.A.P.; S.A.P.; A.A.P.

Precedence
- Next (higher): Grand Royal Order of Sultan Ahmad Shah of Pahang
- Next (lower): Order of the Crown of Pahang
- Grand Companion Companion Officer Member; Ribbon bar of the order

The Most Illustrious Order of Sultan Ahmad Shah of Pahang (Malay: Darjah Kebesaran Sultan Ahmad Shah Pahang Yang Amat Di Mulia) is a knighthood order of the Sultanate of Pahang.

== History ==
The order was founded by Sultan Ahmad Shah on 24 October 1977. It is awarded to individuals who have rendered meritorious service to the State.

== Classes ==
There are four classes of the order:

- Grand Companion of the Order of Sultan Ahmad Shah of Pahang (post-nominal letters : SSAP)
- Companion of the Order of Sultan Ahmad Shah of Pahang (post-nominal letters : DSAP)
- Officer of the Order of Sultan Ahmad Shah of Pahang (post-nominal letters : SAP)
- Member of the Order of Sultan Ahmad Shah of Pahang (post-nominal letters : AAP)

== Recipients ==
=== Knight Grand Companion (S.S.A.P.) ===
The grand knights receives the title Dato' Sri and his wife Datin Sri

- 1977: Abdullah of Pahang
- 1977: Mahathir Mohamad
- 1977: Hamzah Abu Samah
- 1978: Ghazali Shafie
- 1980: Tengku Razaleigh Hamzah
- 1981: Tengku Ahmad Rithauddeen Ismail
- 1981: Harris Salleh
- 1982: Lee Kim Sai
- 1985: Najib Razak
- 1988: Daim Zainuddin
- 1988: Joseph Pairin Kitingan
- 1990: Anwar Ibrahim
- 1992: Abdul Taib Mahmud
- 1996: Halim Saad
- 1998: Sabbaruddin Chik
- 1999: Abdullah Ahmad Badawi
- 1999: Adnan Yaakob
- 2001: Samsudin Osman
- 2002: Zeti Akhtar Aziz
- 2002: Shahidan Kassim
- 2002: Teh Hong Piow
- 2003: Norian Mai
- 2003: Chan Kong Choy
- 2003: Siti Zaharah Sulaiman
- 2003: Mohd Anwar Mohd Nor
- 2004: Rosmah Mansor
- 2004: Abdul Aziz Zainal
- 2004: Mohd Bakri Omar
- 2004: Hishammuddin Hussein
- 2004: Nor Mohamed Yakcop
- 2004: Abdul Aziz Shamsuddin
- 2004: Jamaluddin Jarjis
- 2004: Abdul Kadir Sheikh Fadzir
- 2004: Samy Vellu
- 2005: Lim Keng Yaik
- 2005: Rais Yatim
- 2005: Shahrizat Abdul Jalil
- 2005: Musa Hassan
- 2005: Abdul Gani Patail
- 2006: Lim Wee-Chai
- 2006: Mohd Sidek Hassan
- 2006: Tiong King Sing
- 2006: Tengku Adnan Tengku Mansor
- 2006: Mohd Radzi Sheikh Ahmad
- 2006: Azizan Ariffin
- 2006: Richard Malanjum
- 2007: Azalina Othman Said
- 2007: Idris Jala
- 2007: Abdul Wahid Omar
- 2007: Tengku Azlan
- 2007: Nazir Razak
- 2007: Lim Kok Thay
- 2007: Leo Moggie Irok
- 2008: Ismail Sabri Yaakob
- 2008: Ng Yen Yen
- 2008: Ahmad Zahid Hamidi
- 2008: Liow Tiong Lai
- 2008: Ong Tee Keat
- 2008: Mustapa Mohamed
- 2008: Mohamed Nazri Abdul Aziz
- 2008: Reezal Merican
- 2008: Ismail Omar
- 2008: Abdul Aziz Jaafar
- 2008: Arifin Zakaria
- 2008: Ahmad Said Hamdan
- 2009: Ali Hamsa
- 2009: Teo Tsoon Yong (Zhang Junrong)
- 2009: Sallehuddin Mohamed
- 2009: Peter Chin Fah Kui
- 2009: Anifah Aman
- 2010: Khalid Abu Bakar
- 2010: Zulkifeli Mohd Zin
- 2010: Hussin Ismail
- 2010: Mohamed Apandi Ali
- 2010: Ahmad Shabery Cheek
- 2011: Huang Tiong Sii
- 2011: Ackbal Abdul Samad
- 2011: Chor Chee Heung
- 2011: Kong Cho Ha
- 2012: James Dawos Mamit
- 2012: Mohd Irwan Serigar Abdullah
- 2012: Syed Danial Syed Ahmad
- 2013: Fadillah Yusof
- 2013: Noor Hisham Abdullah
- 2013: Noor Rashid Ibrahim
- 2013: Syed Ismail Syed Azizan
- 2013: Mohamad Shukri Abdull
- 2013: Joseph Kurup
- 2013: Rohani Abdul Karim
- 2013: Richard Riot Jaem
- 2013: Hasan Malek
- 2013: Idrus Harun
- 2013: Tajuddin Abdul Rahman
- 2014: Noorainee Abdul Rahman
- 2014: Hamidah Khamis
- 2014: Affendi Buang
- 2014: Azam Baki
- 2014: Wan Rosdy Wan Ismail
- 2014: Mohd Sharkar Shamsudin
- 2014: Mohd Soffi Abd Razak
- 2014: Shahiruddin Ab Moin
- 2014: Ishak Muhamad
- 2014: Ti Lian Ker
- 2014: Wong Hea Ngun
- 2014: Abdul Rahman Bakar
- 2014 : Hasmiza Othman
- 2015: Ab Rauf Yusoh
- 2015: Tengku Zafrul Aziz
- 2015: Ismail Bakar
- 2015: Jamil Khir Baharom
- 2015: Mohamed Jaafar
- 2015: Ismail Muttalib
- 2015: Ikmal Hisham Abdul Aziz
- 2015: Mohd Johari Baharum
- 2015: Zainal Rahim Seman
- 2015: Abdul Manan Ismail
- 2015: Irmohizam Ibrahim
- 2015: Muhaini Zainal Abidin
- 2015: Vigneswaran Sanasee
- 2015: Doris Sophia Brodi
- 2015: Chew Yu Ming
- 2016: Acryl Sani Abdullah Sani
- 2016: Abdul Ghafar Rajab
- 2016: Yap Chen Hiong
- 2016: Mohamad Fuzi Harun
- 2016: Mohamad Norza Zakaria
- 2016: Nancy Shukri
- 2016: Mohamed Raus Sharif
- 2016: Wee Jeck Seng
- 2016: Bung Moktar Radin
- 2016: Jalaluddin Abdul Rahman
- 2016: Adham Baba
- 2016: Rusli Ahmad
- 2016: Tengku Hassanal Ibrahim Alam Shah
- 2017: Siti Nurhaliza
- 2017: Johari Harun
- 2017: Mohd Johari Hussain
- 2017: Chang Ding Shin
- 2017: Abdul Rahman Mohamad
- 2017: Norol Azali Sulaiman
- 2017: Syed Ibrahim Syed Ahmad
- 2017: Shafik Fauzan Sharif
- 2017: Shahaniza Shamsuddin
- 2017: Hou Kok Chung
- 2017: Jailani Johari
- 2017: Aliff Syukri Kamarzaman
- 2018: Mohd Zakaria Ahmad
- 2018: Fauzi Abdul Rahman
- 2018: Hoh Khai Mun
- 2018: Rossa (singer)
- 2020: Tengku Muhammad Iskandar Ri'ayatuddin Shah
- 2020: Tengku Amir Nasser Ibrahim
- 2020: Tengku Puteri Iman Afzan
- 2020: Abdul Jalil Hassan
- 2020: Tuan Ibrahim Tuan Man
- 2021: Mohd Shafiq Abdullah
- 2021: Hamzah Zainudin
- 2021: Saifuddin Abdullah
- 2021: Mohd Asghar Khan Goriman Khan
- 2021: Wan Ahmad Dahlan Abdul Aziz
- 2022: Razarudin Husain
- 2022: Ramlan Harun
- 2023: Ayob Khan Mydin Pitchay
- 2023: Mohd Khalid Ismail
- 2023: Mohd Shuhaily Mohd Zain
- 2023: Tengku Fahd Mu'adzam
- 2024: Ahmad Jazlan Yaakub
- 2024: Shamsul Azri Abu Bakar
- 2024: Muhamad Norazlan Aris
- 2024: Ramanan Ramakrishnan
- 2024: Harjeet Singh Hardev Singh
- 2024: Baharin Din
- 2024: Low Kok Thye
- 2024: Yeoh Seok Hong
- 2025: Arthur Joseph Kurup

=== Knight Companion (D.S.A.P.) ===
The Knight Companions receives the title Dato' and his wife Datin

- 1986: Mohd Zaman Khan
- 1986: Abdul Rahman Arshad
- 1988: Megat Junid
- 1988: Borhan Ahmad
- 1995: Md Hashim Hussein
- 1996: Yahya Awang
- 1998: Mohd Jamil Johari
- 2002: Zainal Abidin Zin
- 2002: Mohd Sedek Mohd Ali
- 2002: Dell Akbar Khan
- 2004: Kalimullah Masheerul Hassan
- 2005: Noh Omar
- 2005: Noraini Ahmad
- 2006: Koh Hong Sun
- 2006: Abdul Razak Bokhari
- 2007: Muhammad Sabtu Osman
- 2009: Sudirman Haji Arshad (posthumously)
- 2010: Mustapha Maarof
- 2011: Noriah Kasnon
- 2011: Nazri Ngah
- 2014: Law Hong Soon
- 2014: Fatimah Ghazali
- 2015: Nizar Najib
- 2016: Sahabudin Abdul Manan
- 2018: Abdul Rahim Muda
- 2018: Abd. Aziz Mat Kiram
- 2018: Mohd. Fakhruddin Mohd. Arif
- 2021: Leong Ngah Ngah
- 2022: Mohd Roslan Sulaiman
- 2023: Raja Kamarul Bahrin

== See also ==
- Orders, decorations, and medals of the Malaysian states and federal territories#Pahang
- Orders, decorations, and medals of Pahang
- List of post-nominal letters (Pahang)
