= Jelai =

Political subdivision in Malaysia

Jelai (N02)
Pahang constituency

State constituency
- Legislature: Pahang State Legislative Assembly
MLA
Wan Rosdy Wan Ismail
BN
- Constituency created: 1959
- First contested: 1959
- Last contested: 2022

Demographics
- Electors (2022): 19,182

Jelai is a state constituency in Pahang, Malaysia. It is one of the 42 constituencies represented in the Pahang State Legislative Assembly.

== Demographics ==
Ethnic breakdown of Jelai's electorate as of 2022
1. Malay (53.0%)
2. Other ethnicities (45.8%)
3. Indian (0.84%)
4. Chinese (0.42%)

== History ==
=== Polling districts ===
According to the gazette issued on 31 October 2022, the Cameron Highlands constituency has a total of 29 polling districts.

State constituency	Polling Districts	Code	Location
Jelai（N02）	Pos Lanai	078/02/01	SK Lanai
Jelai（N02）	Kuala Medang	078/02/02	SK Kuala Medang
Jelai（N02）	Tanjung Gahai	078/02/03	SK Tanjung Gahai
Jelai（N02）	Bukit Kota	078/02/04	SK Batu Yon
Jelai（N02）	Kampung Keledek	078/02/05	SK Kampung Keledek
Jelai（N02）	Lubuk Kulit	078/02/06	SK Lubok Kulit
Jelai（N02）	FELDA Sungai Koyan Satu	078/02/07	SK LKTP Sungai Koyan
Jelai（N02）	FELDA Sungai Koyan Dua & Tiga	078/02/08	SMK Sungai Koyan
Jelai（N02）	Pos Betau	078/02/09	SK Betau
Jelai（N02）	Pos Sinderut	078/02/10	SK Senderut
Jelai（N02）	Pos Lenjang	078/02/11	SK Lenjang
Jelai（N02）	Pos Titum	078/02/12	SK Titom

=== Representation history ===
Members of the Legislative Assembly for Jelai
Assembly	No	Years	Name	Party
Constituency created
1st	N21	1959-1964	Muhammad Nor Sulaiman	Alliance (UMNO)
2nd	N21	1964	Muhammad Nor Sulaiman	Alliance (UMNO)
2nd	N21	1964-1969	Abu Samah Idris	Alliance (UMNO)
		1969-1971	Assembly dissolved	
3rd	N21	1971-1974	Wan Abdul Rahman Wan Ibrahim	Alliance (UMNO)
3rd	N21	1973-1974	Wan Abdul Rahman Wan Ibrahim	BN (UMNO)
4th	N01	1974-1978	Ramli Abdul Ghani	BN (UMNO)
5th	N01	1978-1982	Mohamed Hashim Idrus	BN (UMNO)
6th	N01	1982-1986	Mohamed Hashim Idrus	BN (UMNO)
7th	N02	1986-1990	Abdullah Sulaiman	BN (UMNO)
8th	N02	1990-1995	Abdullah Sulaiman	BN (UMNO)
9th	N02	1995-1999	Omar Othman	BN (UMNO)
10th	N02	1999-2004	Omar Othman	BN (UMNO)
11th	N02	2004-2008	Wan Rosdy Wan Ismail	BN (UMNO)
12th	N02	2008-2013	Wan Rosdy Wan Ismail	BN (UMNO)
13th	N02	2013-2018	Wan Rosdy Wan Ismail	BN (UMNO)
14th	N02	2018-2022	Wan Rosdy Wan Ismail	BN (UMNO)
15th	N02	2022-present	Wan Rosdy Wan Ismail	BN (UMNO)

== Election results ==
Pahang state election, 2022: Jelai
Party	Candidate	Votes	%	∆%
BN	Wan Rosdy Wan Ismail	10,092	68.81	▲8.64
PN	Abdul Rasid Mohamed Ali	3,109	21.20	▲21.20
PH	Ismail Mohd Hussin	1,465	9.99	▲9.99
Total valid votes		14,666	100.00	
Total rejected ballots		483		
Unreturned ballots		38		
Turnout		15,187	79.17	▼3.03
Registered electors		19,182		
Majority		6,983	47.61	▲11.59
BN hold		Swing		

Pahang state election, 2018
Party	Candidate	Votes	%	∆%
BN	Wan Rosdy Wan Ismail	5,858	60.17	▼5.64
PAS	Abdul Karim Nor	2,351	24.15	▼6.28
PKR	Abdul Rasid Mohamed Ali	1,298	13.33	▲13.33
Socialist Party of Malaysia	Mat Nor Ayat	229	2.35	▲2.35
Total valid votes		9,736	100.00	
Total rejected ballots		471		
Unreturned ballots		103		
Turnout		10,310	82.20	▼1.77
Registered electors		12,543		
Majority		3,507	36.02	▲0.64
BN hold		Swing		
Source(s) "Pahang - 14th General Election Malaysia (GE14 / PRU14)". The Star.

Pahang state election, 2013: Jelai
Party	Candidate	Votes	%	∆%
BN	Wan Rosdy Wan Ismail	5,919	65.81	▼4.85
PAS	Abdul Karim Nor	2,737	30.43	▲30.43
Independent	Alagu Thangarajoo	338	3.76	▲3.76
Total valid votes		8,994	100.00	
Total rejected ballots		396		
Unreturned ballots		1		
Turnout		9,391	83.97	▲8.91
Registered electors		11,184		
Majority		3,182	35.38	▼5.94
BN hold		Swing		

Pahang state election, 2008: Jelai
Party	Candidate	Votes	%	∆%
BN	Wan Rosdy Wan Ismail	4,482	70.66	▲2.84
PAS	Abdullah Abdul Wahab	1,861	29.34	▲29.34
Total valid votes		6,343	100.00	
Total rejected ballots		323		
Unreturned ballots		8		
Turnout		6,674	75.06	▲2.88
Registered electors		8,892		
Majority		2,621	41.32	▲5.69
BN hold		Swing		

Pahang state election, 2004: Jelai
Party	Candidate	Votes	%	∆%
BN	Wan Rosdy Wan Ismail	4,145	67.82	▲10.51
PAS	Abdul Rahman Awang Ngah	1,967	32.18	▼7.97
Total valid votes		6,112	100.00	
Total rejected ballots		276		
Unreturned ballots		0		
Turnout		6,388	72.18	▲7.17
Registered electors		8,850		
Majority		2,178	35.63	▲18.48
BN hold		Swing		

Pahang state election, 1999: Jelai
Party	Candidate	Votes	%	∆%
BN	Omar Othman	3,180	57.31	▼13.09
PAS	Mohd Yusof Abdul Rahman	2,228	40.15	▲10.55
Independent	Norya Abas	141	2.54	▲2.54
Total valid votes		5,549	100.00	
Total rejected ballots		287		
Unreturned ballots		12		
Turnout		5,848	65.01	▲0.32
Registered electors		8,995		
Majority		952	17.16	▼23.64
BN hold		Swing		

Pahang state election, 1995: Jelai
Party	Candidate	Votes	%	∆%
BN	Omar Othman	3,681	70.40	▲10.14
PAS	Kassim Yahya	1,548	29.60	▼10.14
Total valid votes		5,229	100.00	
Total rejected ballots		215		
Unreturned ballots		18		
Turnout		5,462	64.69	▼6.97
Registered electors		8,443		
Majority		2,133	40.79	▲20.27
BN hold		Swing		

Pahang state election, 1990: Jelai
Party	Candidate	Votes	%	∆%
BN	Abdullah Sulaiman	3,251	60.26	▼12.34
PAS	Osman Abdul Hamid	2,144	39.74	▲12.34
Total valid votes		5,395	100.00	
Total rejected ballots		220		
Unreturned ballots		0		
Turnout		5,615	71.67	▲6.19
Registered electors		7,835		
Majority		1,107	20.52	▼24.69
BN hold		Swing		

Pahang state election, 1986: Jelai
Party	Candidate	Votes	%	∆%
BN	Abdullah Sulaiman	3,347	72.60	▲0.41
PAS	Mukhtar Ab Rahman	1,263	27.40	▼0.41
Total valid votes		4,610	100.00	
Total rejected ballots		141		
Unreturned ballots		0		
Turnout		4,751	65.48	▼2.02
Registered electors		7,256		
Majority		2,084	45.21	▲0.82
BN hold		Swing		

Pahang state election, 1982: Jelai
Party	Candidate	Votes	%	∆%
BN	Mohd Hashim Idrus	3,201	72.19	▲17.29
PAS	Osman Abdul Hamid	1,233	27.81	▲4.24
Total valid votes		4,434	100.00	
Total rejected ballots		101		
Unreturned ballots		0		
Turnout		4,535	67.50	▲4.10
Registered electors		6,719		
Majority		1,968	44.38	▲13.04
BN hold		Swing		

Pahang state election, 1978: Jelai
Party	Candidate	Votes	%
BN	Mohd Hashim Idrus	1,729	54.91
PAS	Harun Jaafar	742	23.56
Independent	Nus Mat Duyar	405	12.86
Independent	Wan Ismail Wan Chik	273	8.67
Total valid votes		3,149	100.00
Total rejected ballots		171	
Unreturned ballots		0	
Turnout		3,320	63.40
Registered electors		5,237	
Majority		987	31.34
BN hold		Swing	

Pahang state election, 1974: Jelai
Party	Candidate	Votes	%	∆%
On the nomination day, Ramli Abd Ghani won uncontested.
BN	Ramli Abd Ghani			
Total valid votes				
Total rejected ballots				
Unreturned ballots				
Turnout				
Registered electors		4,104		
Majority				
BN hold		Swing		-

Pahang state election, 1969: Jelai
Party	Candidate	Votes	%	∆%
Alliance	Wan Abdul Rahman Wan Ibrahim	2,846	60.26	▼17.23
PMIP	Kassim Yahya	1,578	33.41	▲10.90
Parti Sosialis Rakyat Malaysia	Wahab Ismail	299	6.33	▲6.33
Total valid votes		4,723	100.00	
Total rejected ballots		550		
Unreturned ballots		0		
Turnout		5,273	77.62	▼2.33
Registered electors		6,793		
Majority		1,268	26.85	▼28.12
Alliance hold		Swing		

Pahang state election, 1964: Jelai
Party	Candidate	Votes	%	∆%
Alliance	Muhammad Nor Sulaiman	3,259	77.48	▲2.21
PMIP	Wan Ibrahim Wan Dol	947	22.52	▼2.21
Total valid votes		4,206	100.00	
Total rejected ballots		361		
Unreturned ballots		0		
Turnout		4,567	79.95	▼2.77
Registered electors		5,712		
Majority		2,312	54.97	▲4.42
Alliance hold		Swing		

Pahang state election, 1959: Jelai
Party	Candidate	Votes	%
Alliance	Muhammad Nor Sulaiman	2,816	75.27
PMIP	Sulaiman Sidek	925	24.73
Total valid votes		3,741	100.00
Total rejected ballots		90	
Unreturned ballots		0	
Turnout		3,831	82.73
Registered electors		4,631	
Majority		1,891	50.55
This was a new constituency created.
