= Pelangai =

Political subdivision in Malaysia

Pelangai (N36)
Pahang constituency

State constituency
- Legislature: Pahang State Legislative Assembly
MLA
Amizar Abu Adam
BN
- Constituency created: 1984
- First contested: 1986
- Last contested: 2023

Demographics
- Electors (2023): 16,456

Pelangai is a state constituency in Pahang, Malaysia, that is represented in the Pahang State Legislative Assembly. It has been represented by Amizar Abu Adam of Barisan Nasional (BN) since 2023.

== Demographics ==
Ethnic breakdown of Pelangai's electorate as of 2022
1. Malay (72.1%)
2. Chinese (18.2%)
3. Indian (5.71%)
4. Other ethnicities (3.96%)

== History ==
=== Polling districts ===
According to the federal gazette issued on 31 October 2022, the Bentong constituency is divided into 40 polling districts.

| State constituency | Polling district | Code | Location |
|---|---|---|---|
| Pelangai (N36) | FELDA Kemasul | 089/36/01 | SK LKTP Kemasul |
| Pelangai (N36) | FELDA Chemomoi | 089/36/02 | SMK LKTP Chemomoi |
| Pelangai (N36) | FELDA Sungai Kemahal | 089/36/03 | SK LKTP Sungai Kemahal |
| Pelangai (N36) | Kampung Jawi-Jawi | 089/36/04 | SK Pelangai |
| Pelangai (N36) | Simpang Pelangai | 089/36/05 | SMK Seri Pelangai |
| Pelangai (N36) | Manchis | 089/36/06 | SJK (C) Manchis |
| Pelangai (N36) | Sungai Gapoi | 089/36/07 | Dewan Serbaguna Sungai Gapoi |
| Pelangai (N36) | Telemong | 089/36/08 | SJK (C) Telemong |
| Pelangai (N36) | Sungai Perdak | 089/36/09 | Balai Raya Kg. Sungai Perdak |

=== Representation history ===
Members of the Legislative Assembly for Pelangai
| Assembly | No | Years | Name | Party |
Constituency created from Semantan
| 7th | N27 | 1986-1990 | Adnan Yaakob | BN (UMNO) |
| 8th | N27 | 1990-1995 | Adnan Yaakob | BN (UMNO) |
| 9th | N31 | 1995-1999 | Adnan Yaakob | BN (UMNO) |
| 10th | N31 | 1999-2004 | Adnan Yaakob | BN (UMNO) |
| 11th | N36 | 2004-2008 | Adnan Yaakob | BN (UMNO) |
| 12th | N36 | 2008-2013 | Adnan Yaakob | BN (UMNO) |
| 13th | N36 | 2013-2018 | Adnan Yaakob | BN (UMNO) |
| 14th | N36 | 2018-2022 | Adnan Yaakob | BN (UMNO) |
| 15th | N36 | 2022-2023 | Johari Harun | BN (UMNO) |
| 15th | N36 | 2023–present | Amizar Abu Adam | BN (UMNO) |

== Election results ==
Pahang state by-election, 7 October 2023: Pelangai Upon the death of incumbent, Johari Harun
| Party | Candidate | Votes | % | ∆% |
|---|---|---|---|---|
| BN | Amizar Abu Adam | 7,324 | 62.35 | ▲4.64 |
| PN | Kasim Samat | 4,375 | 37.25 | ▲11.51 |
| Independent | Haslihelmey DM Zulhasli | 47 | 0.40 | ▲0.40 |
| Total valid votes | | 11,746 | 100.00 | |
| Total rejected ballots | | 120 | | |
| Unreturned ballots | | 2 | | |
| Turnout | | 11,868 | 72.12 | ▼6.35 |
| Registered electors | | 16,456 | | |
| Majority | | 2,949 | 25.10 | ▼6.87 |
| BN hold | | Swing | | |

Pahang state election, 2022: Pelangai
| Party | Candidate | Votes | % | ∆% |
|---|---|---|---|---|
| BN | Johari Harun | 7,308 | 57.71 | ▲5.31 |
| PN | Kasim Samat | 3,260 | 25.74 | ▲25.74 |
| PH | Ahmed Wafiuddin Shamsuri | 2,031 | 16.04 | ▲16.04 |
| PEJUANG | Isa Ahmad | 65 | 0.51 | ▲0.51 |
| Total valid votes | | 12,664 | 100.00 | |
| Total rejected ballots | | 164 | | |
| Unreturned ballots | | 18 | | |
| Turnout | | 12,846 | 78.47 | ▼4.01 |
| Registered electors | | 16,371 | | |
| Majority | | 4,048 | 31.96 | ▲9.57 |
| BN hold | | Swing | | |

Pahang state election, 2018: Pelangai
| Party | Candidate | Votes | % | ∆% |
|---|---|---|---|---|
| BN | Adnan Yaakob | 5,410 | 52.40 | ▼9.96 |
| PKR | Nor Haizan Abu Hassan | 3,098 | 30.00 | ▲30.00 |
| PAS | Zaharim Osman | 1,817 | 17.60 | ▼20.04 |
| Total valid votes | | 10,325 | 100.00 | |
| Total rejected ballots | | 158 | | |
| Unreturned ballots | | 59 | | |
| Turnout | | 10,542 | 82.48 | ▼2.81 |
| Registered electors | | 12,781 | | |
| Majority | | 2,312 | 22.39 | ▼2.32 |
| BN hold | | Swing | | |

Pahang state election, 2013: Pelangai
| Party | Candidate | Votes | % | ∆% |
|---|---|---|---|---|
| BN | Adnan Yaakob | 6,245 | 62.36 | ▼6.58 |
| PAS | Abdul Hamid Bahatim | 3,770 | 37.64 | ▲6.58 |
| Total valid votes | | 10,015 | 100.00 | |
| Total rejected ballots | | 227 | | |
| Unreturned ballots | | 24 | | |
| Turnout | | 10,266 | 85.29 | ▲8.20 |
| Registered electors | | 12,037 | | |
| Majority | | 2,475 | 24.71 | ▼13.16 |
| BN hold | | Swing | | |

Pahang state election, 2008: Pelangai
| Party | Candidate | Votes | % | ∆% |
|---|---|---|---|---|
| BN | Adnan Yaakob | 5,406 | 68.94 | ▼5.96 |
| PAS | Hamdan Ahmad | 2,436 | 31.06 | ▲5.96 |
| Total valid votes | | 7,842 | 100.00 | |
| Total rejected ballots | | 154 | | |
| Unreturned ballots | | 14 | | |
| Turnout | | 8,010 | 77.09 | ▲1.38 |
| Registered electors | | 10,391 | | |
| Majority | | 2,970 | 37.87 | ▼11.93 |
| BN hold | | Swing | | |

Pahang state election, 2004: Pelangai
| Party | Candidate | Votes | % | ∆% |
|---|---|---|---|---|
| BN | Adnan Yaakob | 5,521 | 74.90 | ▲9.63 |
| PAS | Mohamed Mat Ali | 1,850 | 25.10 | ▲25.10 |
| Total valid votes | | 7,371 | 100.00 | |
| Total rejected ballots | | 188 | | |
| Unreturned ballots | | 21 | | |
| Turnout | | 7,580 | 75.70 | ▲2.85 |
| Registered electors | | 10,013 | | |
| Majority | | 3,671 | 49.80 | ▲19.27 |
| BN hold | | Swing | | |

Pahang state election, 1999: Pelangai
| Party | Candidate | Votes | % | ∆% |
|---|---|---|---|---|
| BN | Adnan Yaakob | 4,529 | 65.27 | ▼17.49 |
| PKR | Abdul Wahid Ahmad Suhaime | 2,410 | 34.73 | ▲34.73 |
| Total valid votes | | 6,939 | 100.00 | |
| Total rejected ballots | | 156 | | |
| Unreturned ballots | | 15 | | |
| Turnout | | 7,110 | 72.85 | ▲1.11 |
| Registered electors | | 9,760 | | |
| Majority | | 2,119 | 30.54 | ▼34.99 |
| BN hold | | Swing | | |

Pahang state election, 1995: Pelangai
| Party | Candidate | Votes | % | ∆% |
|---|---|---|---|---|
| BN | Adnan Yaakob | 5,484 | 82.76 | ▲14.63 |
| S46 | Mohamed Buyong | 1,142 | 17.24 | ▼14.63 |
| Total valid votes | | 6,626 | 100.00 | |
| Total rejected ballots | | 228 | | |
| Unreturned ballots | | 7 | | |
| Turnout | | 6,861 | 71.74 | ▼2.27 |
| Registered electors | | 9,564 | | |
| Majority | | 4,342 | 65.53 | ▲29.27 |
| BN hold | | Swing | | |

Pahang state election, 1990: Pelangai
| Party | Candidate | Votes | % | ∆% |
|---|---|---|---|---|
| BN | Adnan Yaakob | 6,231 | 68.13 | ▲3.95 |
| S46 | Shamsuddin @ Damanhuri Moner | 2,915 | 31.87 | ▲31.87 |
| Total valid votes | | 9,146 | 100.00 | |
| Total rejected ballots | | 371 | | |
| Unreturned ballots | | 83 | | |
| Turnout | | 9,600 | 74.01 | ▼0.41 |
| Registered electors | | 12,972 | | |
| Majority | | 3,316 | 36.26 | ▼14.14 |
| BN hold | | Swing | | |

Pahang state election, 1986: Pelangai
| Party | Candidate | Votes | % |
|---|---|---|---|
| BN | Adnan Yaakob | 5,955 | 72.08 |
| DAP | Lee Hon | 1,791 | 21.67 |
| PAS | Mat Shun Sidek | 516 | 6.25 |
| Total valid votes | | 8,262 | 100.00 |
| Total rejected ballots | | 244 | |
| Unreturned ballots | | 0 | |
| Turnout | | 8,506 | 74.42 |
| Registered electors | | 11,430 | |
| Majority | | 4,164 | 50.40 |
This was a new constituency created.
