= Johari Harun =

Malaysian politician (1970–2023)

Yang Hormat Dato' Sri Johari Harun SSAP DIMP SMP
- جوهري هارون

Member of the Pahang State Executive Council (Local Government, Housing, Environment and Green Technology: 14 December 2022 – 17 August 2023) (Note: Assumed portfolios 12 days after taking office.)
- In office 2 December 2022 – 17 August 2023
- Monarch: Abdullah
- Menteri Besar: Wan Rosdy Wan Ismail
- Preceded by: Abdul Rahim Muda (Local Government and Housing); Mohd Sharkar Shamsudin (Environment); Mohd. Fakhruddin Mohd. Arif (Green Technology)
- Succeeded by: Wan Rosdy Wan Ismail (Local Government and Housing); Mohd. Fakhruddin Mohd. Arif (Environment); Nizar Najib (Green Technology)
- Constituency: Pelangai

Member of the Pahang State Legislative Assembly for Pelangai
- In office 19 November 2022 – 17 August 2023
- Preceded by: Adnan Yaakob (BN–UMNO)
- Succeeded by: Amizar Abu Adam (BN–UMNO)
- Majority: 4,048 (2022)

Personal details
- Born: Johari bin Harun; 20 January 1970 Janda Baik, Bentong, Pahang, Malaysia
- Died: 17 August 2023 (aged 53) Bandar Elmina, Selangor, Malaysia
- Cause of death: Plane crash
- Resting place: Tanah Perkuburan Islam Raudhatul Sakinah, Taman Selasih, Batu Caves
- Party: United Malays National Organisation (UMNO)
- Other political affiliations: Barisan Nasional (BN)
- Spouse: Maziah Muhammad Sudin
- Children: 5
- Education: Royal Military College
- Alma mater: Universiti Teknologi MARA
- Occupation: Politician; businessman

Johari bin Harun (20 January 1970 – 17 August 2023) was a Malaysian politician and businessman who served as Member of the Pahang State Executive Council (EXCO) in the Barisan Nasional (BN) state administration under Menteri Besar Wan Rosdy Wan Ismail from December 2022 and Member of the Pahang State Legislative Assembly (MLA) for Pelangai from November 2022 to his death in a plane crash in August 2023 respectively. He was a member and Division Chief of Bentong of the United Malays National Organisation (UMNO), a component party of the BN coalition. He was also the group CEO of Gading Group.

== Death ==
On 17 August 2023, Johari and nine others died when their airplane crashed in the middle of a road in Bandar Elmina, Shah Alam in a Subang-bound flight from Langkawi.

== Election results ==
Pahang State Legislative Assembly
Year	Constituency	Candidate	Votes	Pct	Opponent(s)	Votes	Pct	Ballots cast	Majority	Turnout
2022	N36 Pelangai	Johari Harun (UMNO)	7,308	57.71%	Kasim Samat (PAS)	3,260	25.74%	12,846	4,048	78.5%
2022	N36 Pelangai	Johari Harun (UMNO)	7,308	57.71%	Ahmed Wafiuddin Shamsuri (AMANAH)	2,031	16.04%	12,846	4,048	78.5%
2022	N36 Pelangai	Johari Harun (UMNO)	7,308	57.71%	Isa Ahmad (PUTRA)	65	0.51%	12,846	4,048	78.5%

== Honours ==
- Pahang
  - Grand Knight of the Order of Sultan Ahmad Shah of Pahang (SSAP) – Dato' Sri (2017)
  - Knight Companion of the Order of the Crown of Pahang (DIMP) – Dato' (2014)
  - Companion of the Order of the Crown of Pahang (SMP) (2011)
