= Adnan Yaakob =

Malaysian politician and teacher

Yang Berbahagia Tan Sri Dato' Sri Diraja Haji Adnan Yaakob PSM SDSA DGSM DSAP
- عدنان يعقوب

13th Menteri Besar of Pahang
- In office 25 May 1999 – 15 May 2018
- Monarch: Ahmad Shah
- Deputy: Hasan Arifin (25 May–2 December 1999); Tan Aminuddin Ishak (1999–2008)
- Preceded by: Mohd Khalil Yaakob
- Succeeded by: Wan Rosdy Wan Ismail
- Constituency: Pelangai

Member of the Pahang State Legislative Assembly for Pelangai
- In office 3 August 1986 – 19 November 2022
- Preceded by: Position established
- Succeeded by: Johari Harun (BN–UMNO)
- Majority: 4,164 (1986); 3,316 (1990); 4,342 (1995); 2,119 (1999); 3,671 (2004); 2,970 (2008); 2,475 (2013); 2,312 (2018)

Faction represented in Pahang State Legislative Assembly
- 1986–2022: Barisan Nasional

Personal details
- Born: Adnan bin Yaakob Bentong, Pahang, Federation of Malaya (now Malaysia)
- Citizenship: Malaysian
- Party: United Malays National Organisation (UMNO)
- Other political affiliations: Barisan Nasional (BN)
- Spouse: Junaini Kassim
- Children: 4
- Education: University of Malaya (DipEd); International Islamic University Malaysia
- Occupation: Politician
- Profession: Teacher

Adnan Yaakob (Jawi: عدنان بن حاج يعقوب) is a Malaysian politician and teacher who served as the 13th Menteri Besar of Pahang from May 1999 to May 2018, making him the longest serving Menteri Besar of the state, and Member of the Pahang State Legislative Assembly (MLA) for Pelangai from August 1986 to November 2022. He is a member and was the State Chairman of Pahang and Division Chief of Bentong of the United Malays National Organisation (UMNO), a component party of the Barisan Nasional (BN) coalition. He is the longest-serving Menteri Besar of Pahang and Pelangai MLA, serving in both positions for 19 years and 36 years respectively.

== Biography ==
Born and raised in Bentong, Pahang, Adnan graduated from secondary school and became a teacher in 1969. He then attended the University of Malaya from 1972 and graduated in 1975. He studied for his Diploma of Education until 1977 before enrolling at the International Islamic University Malaysia to study law.

Adnan never completed his law studies, having dropped out to join full-time politics. He contested and won the Pahang State Legislative Assembly seat in Pelangai during the 1986 state election. He was elected UMNO division chief in Bentong in 1987.

In 1999, Adnan was appointed the Menteri Besar of Pahang, succeeding Mohd Khalil Yaakob. He was succeeded by Wan Rosdy Wan Ismail as the Menteri Besar in 2018.

== Personal life ==
Adnan is married to Junaini Kassim and the couple have four children.

== Election results ==
Pahang State Legislative Assembly
Year	Constituency	Candidate	Votes	Pct	Opponent(s)	Votes	Pct	Ballots cast	Majority	Turnout
1986	N27 Pelangai	Adnan Yaakob (UMNO)	5,955	72.08%	Lee Hon (DAP)	1,791	21.67%	8,506	4,164	74.42%
1986	N27 Pelangai	Adnan Yaakob (UMNO)	5,955	72.08%	Mat Shun Sidek (PAS)	516	6.25%	8,506	4,164	74.42%
1990	N27 Pelangai	Adnan Yaakob (UMNO)	6,231	68.13%	Shamsuddin @ Daman Huri Moner (S46)	2,915	31.87%	9,517	3,316	73.37%
1995	N31 Pelangai	Adnan Yaakob (UMNO)	5,484	82.76%	Mohamed Buyong (S46)	1,142	17.24%	6,861	4,342	71.74%
1999	N31 Pelangai	Adnan Yaakob (UMNO)	4,529	65.27%	Abdul Wahid Ahmad Suhaime (keADILan)	2,410	34.73%	7,110	2,119	72.85%
2004	N36 Pelangai	Adnan Yaakob (UMNO)	5,521	74.90%	Mohamed Mat Ali (PAS)	1,850	25.10%	7,580	3,671	75.70%
2008	N36 Pelangai	Adnan Yaakob (UMNO)	5,406	68.94%	Hamdan Ahmad (PAS)	2,436	31.06%	8,010	2,970	77.09%
2013	N36 Pelangai	Adnan Yaakob (UMNO)	6,245	62.36%	Abdul Hamid Bahatim (PAS)	3,770	37.64%	10,242	2,475	85.30%
2018	N36 Pelangai	Adnan Yaakob (UMNO)	5,410	52.40%	Nor Haizan Abu Hassan (AMANAH)	3,098	30.00%	10,542	2,312	82.50%
2018	N36 Pelangai	Adnan Yaakob (UMNO)	5,410	52.40%	Zaharim Osman (PAS)	1,817	17.60%	10,542	2,312	82.50%

== Honours ==
- Malaysia
  - Commander of the Order of Loyalty to the Crown of Malaysia (PSM) – Tan Sri (2022)
- Pahang
  - Knight Companion of the Order of Sultan Ahmad Shah of Pahang (DSAP) – Dato' (1992)
  - Grand Knight of the Order of Sultan Ahmad Shah of Pahang (SSAP) – Dato' Sri (1999)
  - Grand Royal Knight of the Grand Royal Order of Sultan Ahmad Shah of Pahang (SDSA) – Dato' Sri Diraja (2010)
- Malacca
  - Grand Commander of the Exalted Order of Malacca (DGSM) – Datuk Seri (2004)
