= List of post-nominal letters (Pahang) =

Companion, Order of the Crown of Pahang

This is a list of post-nominal letters used in Pahang. The order in which they follow an individual's name is the same as the order of precedence for the wearing of order insignias, decorations, and medals. When applicable, non-hereditary titles are indicated.

Grades		Post-nominal	Title	Wife's title	Ribbon
The Most Illustrious Royal Family Order of Pahang - Darjah Kerabat Yang Maha Mulia Utama Kerabat Diraja Pahang
Royal Principal	Darjah Kerabat Pahang	D.K.P.	--	--	
The Most Esteemed Family Order of the Crown of Indra of Pahang - Darjah Kerabat Sri Indra Mahkota Pahang Yang Amat Dihormati
1st class	Darjah Kerabat Sri Indra Mahkota Pahang Yang Amat Dihormati Kelas I	D.K. I	--	--	
2nd class	Darjah Kebesaran Mahkota Pahang Yang Amat Dihormati Kelas II	D.K. II	--	--	
The Most Illustrious Order of Al-Sultan Abdullah of Pahang - Darjah Kebesaran Al-Sultan Abdullah Pahang Yang Amat Mulia
Grand Companion	Sri Setia Al-Sultan Abdullah Ahmad Shah	S.A.A.S.	Dato' Sri Setia	Datin Sri Setia	
Companion	Darjah Al-Sultan Abdullah Ahmad Shah	D.S.A.S.	Dato'	Datin'	
Officer	Setia Al-Sultan Abdullah Pahang	S.A.S.	--	--	
The Grand Royal Order of Sultan Ahmad Shah of Pahang - Darjah Sri Diraja Sultan Ahmad Shah Pahang
Grand Recipient	Sri Diraja Sultan Ahmad Shah Pahang	S.D.S.A.	Dato' Sri Diraja	Datin Sri Diraja	
The Most Illustrious Order of Sultan Ahmad Shah of Pahang - Darjah Kebesaran Sri Sultan Ahmad Shah Pahang Yang Amat Mulia
Grand Companion	Sri Sultan Ahmad Shah Pahang	S.S.A.P.	Dato' Sri	Datin Sri	
Companion	Darjah Sultan Ahmad Shah Pahang	D.S.A.P.	Dato'	Datin	
Officer	Setia Ahmad Shah Pahang	S.A.P.	--	--	
Member	Ahli Ahmad Shah Pahang	A.A.P.	--	--	
The Esteemed Order of the Crown of Pahang - Darjah Kebesaran Mahkota Pahang Yang Amat Mulia
Grand Companion	Sri Indera Mahkota Pahang	S.I.M.P.	Dato' Indera	Datin Indera	
Companion	Darjah Indera Mahkota Pahang	D.I.M.P.	Dato'	Datin	
Officer	Setia Mahkota Pahang	S.M.P.	--	--	
Member	Ahli Mahkota Pahang	A.M.P.	--	--	
Distinguished Service Medal - Pingat Khidmat Cemerlang
Silver Medal	Pingat Khidmat Cemerlang	P.K.C.	--	--	
Conspicuous Gallantry Medal - Pingat Gagah Perwira
Silver Medal	Pingat Gagah Perwira	P.G.P.	--	--	
Justice of the Peace - Jaksa Pendamai
Certificate	Jaksa Pendamai	J.P.	--	--	
Distinguished Conduct Medal - Pingat Kelakuan Terpuji
Bronze Medal	Pingat Kelakuan Terpuji	P.K.T.	--	--	
Meritorious Service Medal - Pingat Jasa Kebaktian
Bronze Medal	Pingat Jasa Kebaktian	P.J.K.	--	--	
Silver Jubilee Medal 1957 - Pingat Jubli Perak Pahang 1957
Silver Medal	Pingat Jubli Perak Pahang	--	--	--	
Sultan Haji Ahmad Shah Installation Medal - Pingat Pertabalan Sultan Haji Ahmad Shah
Gold Medal	Pingat Pertabalan Sultan Haji Ahmad Shah	--	--	--	
Silver Medal	Pingat Pertabalan Sultan Haji Ahmad Shah	--	--	--	
Bronze Medal	Pingat Pertabalan Sultan Haji Ahmad Shah	--	--	--	
Silver Jubilee Medal 1999 - Pingat Jubli Perak Pahang 1999
Silver Medal	Pingat Jubli Perak Pahang	--	--	--	

== See also ==
- Orders, decorations, and medals of Pahang
- Order of precedence in Pahang
