= Wan Rosdy Wan Ismail =

Malaysian politician

Yang Amat Berhormat Dato' Sri Diraja Wan Rosdy Wan Ismail SDSA SUMW SSAP DSAP DIMP SMP AMP PhD Hon (YU) MLA
- وان رسدي وان إسماعيل
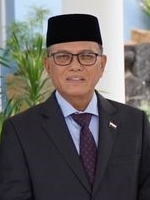

14th Menteri Besar of Pahang
- Incumbent
- Assumed office 15 May 2018
- Monarchs: Ahmad Shah (2018–2019); Abdullah (since 2019)
- Preceded by: Adnan Yaakob
- Constituency: Jelai

Member of the Pahang State Executive Council (Rural Development and Orang Asli Affairs : 13 March 2008–15 May 2013) (Housing and Local Government : 16 May 2013–14 May 2018)
- In office 13 March 2008 – 14 May 2018
- Monarch: Ahmad Shah
- Menteri Besar: Adnan Yaakob
- Preceded by: Adnan Yaakob (Rural Development); Ishak Muhamad (Orang Asli Affairs)
- Succeeded by: Abdul Rahim Muda
- Constituency: Jelai

Vice President of the United Malays National Organisation
- Incumbent
- Assumed office 18 March 2023 Serving with: Mohamed Khaled Nordin &; Johari Abdul Ghani
- President: Ahmad Zahid Hamidi
- Preceded by: Ismail Sabri Yaakob

Member of the Pahang State Legislative Assembly for Jelai
- Incumbent
- Assumed office 21 March 2004
- Preceded by: Omar Othman (BN–UMNO)
- Majority: 2,178 (2004); 2,621 (2008); 3,182 (2013); 3,507 (2018); 6,983 (2022)

Faction represented in the Pahang State Legislative Assembly
- 2004–: Barisan Nasional

Personal details
- Born: Wan Rosdy bin Wan Ismail Kampung Tanjung Gahai, Kuala Lipis, Pahang, Malaya (now Malaysia)
- Citizenship: Malaysia
- Party: United Malays National Organisation (UMNO)
- Other political affiliations: Barisan Nasional (BN)
- Spouse: Burhah Mohammed
- Children: 3
- Education: Institut Teknologi Mara (Dip); Universiti Sains Malaysia (BA)
- Occupation: Politician
- Website: wanrosdy.com

Wan Rosdy bin Wan Ismail (Jawi: وان رسدي بن وان إسماعيل) is a Malaysian politician who has served as the 14th Menteri Besar of Pahang since May 2018 and Member of the Pahang State Legislative Assembly (MLA) for Jelai since March 2004. He served as Member of the Pahang State Executive Council (EXCO) from March 2008 to May 2018. He is a member and State Chairman of Pahang of the United Malays National Organisation (UMNO), a component party of the Barisan Nasional (BN) coalition. He has also served as one of the Vice Presidents of UMNO since March 2023.

== Early life and education ==
Wan Rosdy was born at Kampung Tanjung Gahai, Kuala Lipis, Pahang, Malaya (now Malaysia). He received his early education at the Clifford Primary School (1965), Sekolah Menengah Clifford and Sekolah Menengah Mahmud Raub. He then pursuing a Diploma in Commerce at the Institut Teknologi Mara (ITM). He then pursued his Bachelor of Arts (BA) degree in Social Science (Political Science) at Universiti Sains Malaysia (USM).

== Early career ==
Wan Rosdy began his career in the civil service as an executive with the Perak branch of the National Paddy and Rice Board (LPN) in 1985, before being appointed manager at the LPN Complex in Arau, Perlis in 1989. He has also held several posts within Bernas.

== Political career ==
Wan Rosdy was elected as Cameron Highlands UMNO Division Chief in 2003 has been Cameron Highlands Barisan Nasional chairperson since 2008.

In 2004, Wan Rosdy was elected as Jelai state assemblyperson and he has been serving the constituency since. He has also served as chairperson of the Pahang Orang Asli Affairs and Rural Development Committee from 2008 to 2013, before being appointed as state exco for the second term as Pahang Housing and Municipal committee chairperson in 2013.

On May 15, 2018, Wan Rosdy was sworn in as Menteri Besar after BN was reelected as the state government in the 2018 Pahang state election, replacing Adnan Yaakob who was retiring after serving in the position for 19 years. Adnan however remained as an MLA. On 28 November 2022 after the 2022 Pahang state election resulted in a hung assembly, he was sworn in as the Menteri Besar for the second term after BN and Pakatan Harapan (PH) agreed to form the state coalition of Pahang and nominate him to be reappointed to the position. The two coalitions received the support from a total of 24 MLAs to do so, which exceeded the simple majority of at least 22 MLAs required.

== Personal life ==
He is married to Burhah Mohamed and has three children.

== Election results ==
Pahang State Legislative Assembly
| Year | Constituency | Candidate | Votes | Pct | Opponent(s) | Votes | Pct | Ballots cast | Majority | Turnout |
|---|---|---|---|---|---|---|---|---|---|---|
| 2004 | N02 Jelai | Wan Rosdy Wan Ismail (UMNO) | 4,145 | 67.82% | Abdul Rahman Awang Ngah (PAS) | 1,967 | 32.18% | 6,388 | 2,178 | 72.18% |
| 2008 | N02 Jelai | Wan Rosdy Wan Ismail (UMNO) | 4,482 | 70.66% | Abdullah Abdul Wahab (PKR) | 1,861 | 29.34% | 6,674 | 2,621 | 75.06% |
| 2013 | N02 Jelai | Wan Rosdy Wan Ismail (UMNO) | 5,919 | 65.81% | Abdul Karim Nor (PAS) | 2,737 | 30.43% | 9,390 | 3,182 | 84.00% |
| 2013 | N02 Jelai | Wan Rosdy Wan Ismail (UMNO) | 5,919 | 65.81% | Alagu Thangarajoo (IND) | 338 | 3.76% | 9,390 | 3,182 | 84.00% |
| 2018 | N02 Jelai | Wan Rosdy Wan Ismail (UMNO) | 5,858 | 60.17% | Abdul Karim Nor (PAS) | 2,351 | 24.15% | 10,310 | 3,507 | 82.20% |
| 2018 | N02 Jelai | Wan Rosdy Wan Ismail (UMNO) | 5,858 | 60.17% | Abdul Rasid Mohamed Ali (BERSATU) | 1,298 | 13.33% | 10,310 | 3,507 | 82.20% |
| 2018 | N02 Jelai | Wan Rosdy Wan Ismail (UMNO) | 5,858 | 60.17% | Mat Nor Ayat (PSM) | 229 | 2.35% | 10,310 | 3,507 | 82.20% |
| 2022 | N02 Jelai | Wan Rosdy Wan Ismail (UMNO) | 10,092 | 68.81% | Abdul Rasid Mohamed Ali (BERSATU) | 3,109 | 21.20% | 14,666 | 6,983 | 76.46% |
| 2022 | N02 Jelai | Wan Rosdy Wan Ismail (UMNO) | 10,092 | 68.81% | Ismail Mohd Hussin (PKR) | 1,465 | 9.99% | 14,666 | 6,983 | 76.46% |

== Honours ==
=== Honours of Malaysia ===
- Pahang
  - Grand Royal Knight of the Grand Royal Order of Sultan Ahmad Shah of Pahang (SDSA) – Dato' Sri Diraja (2024)
  - Grand Knight of the Order of Sultan Ahmad Shah of Pahang (SSAP) – Dato' Sri (2014)
  - Knight Companion of the Order of the Crown of Pahang (DIMP) – Dato' (2006)
  - Knight Companion of the Order of Sultan Ahmad Shah of Pahang (DSAP) – Dato' (2012)
  - Companion of the Order of the Crown of Pahang (SMP)
  - Member of the Order of the Crown of Pahang (AMP)
- Federal Territory (Malaysia)
  - Grand Knight of the Order of the Territorial Crown (SUMW) – Datuk Seri Utama (2021)

=== Honorary doctorate ===
- Jordan :
  - Honorary (PhD Hon) in Islamic Economics and Banking from the Yarmouk University (2025)
