= Ahmad Shah of Pahang =

King of Malaysia from 1979 to 1984

Ahmad Shah: أحمد شاه
- Al-Musta'in Billah (He who seeks help from God)

King of Malaysia
- Reign: 26 April 1979 – 25 April 1984
- Installation: 10 July 1980
- Predecessor: Yahya Petra
- Successor: Iskandar

Sultan of Pahang
- Reign: 7 May 1974 – 11 January 2019
- Installation: 8 May 1975
- Predecessor: Abu Bakar
- Successor: Abdullah

8th President of AFC
- In office 1 August 1994 – 1 August 2002
- Preceded by: Hamzah Abu Samah
- Succeeded by: Mohammed bin Hammam
- Born: 24 October 1930; Istana Mangga Tunggal, Pekan, Pahang, Federated Malay States
- Died: 22 May 2019 (aged 88); Kuala Lumpur, Malaysia
- Burial: 23 May 2019; Abdullah Mosque, Pekan, Pahang, Malaysia
- Spouse: Tengku Ampuan Afzan (m. 1954; died 1988) Sultanah Kalsom (m. 1991)
- Issue: Tengku Meriam; Tengku Muhaini; Tengku Aishah Marcella; Tengku Abdullah; Tengku Abdul Rahman; Tengku Nong Fatimah; Tengku Shahariah; Tengku Fahad Mua'adzam Shah
Names
- Tengku Ahmad Shah ibni Tengku Abu Bakar (as birth) Tuanku Sultan Haji Ahmad Shah Al-Musta’in Billah ibni Almarhum Sultan Abu Bakar Ri’ayatuddin Al-Mu’azzam Shah (as Yang di-Pertuan Agong) Sultan Haji Ahmad Shah Al-Musta’in Billah ibni Almarhum Sultan Abu Bakar Ri’ayatuddin Al-Mu’azzam Shah (as Sultan of Pahang) Paduka Ayahanda Sultan Haji Ahmad Shah Al-Musta’in Billah ibni Almarhum Sultan Abu Bakar Ri’ayatuddin Al-Mu’azzam Shah (as former Sultan of Pahang)
- House: Bendahara
- Father: Sultan Abu Bakar Ri’ayatuddin Mu’azzam Shah ibni Almarhum Sultan Abdullah Al-Mu’tassim Billah Shah
- Mother: Tengku Ampuan Besar Raja Fatimah binti Almarhum Sultan Iskandar Shah Kaddasullah
- Religion: Sunni Islam

Ahmad Shah Al-Musta’in Billah ibni Almarhum Sultan Abu Bakar Ri’ayatuddin Al-Mu’azzam Shah (Jawi: المرحوم سلطان حاج أحمد شاه المستعين بالله إبن المرحوم سلطان أبو بكر رعاية الدين المعظم شاه; 24 October 1930 – 22 May 2019) was Sultan of Pahang from 1974 until his abdication in 2019, and the seventh Yang di-Pertuan Agong (King of Malaysia), from 1979 to 1984. His abdication as sultan was decided by the Royal Council at an extraordinary meeting on 11 January 2019. A special amendment was made to the state constitution that gave the body more power for this decision, citing the Sultan's incapability to rule due to his failing health. The abdication was announced the next day which was retroactively effective on the day of the Royal Council meeting, paving the way to his son, Abdullah to succeed him as sultan immediately, and subsequently be elected as the next Yang di-Pertuan Agong later the same month.

== Biography ==
Ahmad Shah was born on 24 October 1930 at the Istana Mangga Tunggal, Pekan, Pahang. He was the only son of Sultan Abu Bakar of Pahang (r. 1932–1974) by his official and royal consort, Tengku Ampuan Besar Raja Fatimah binti Almarhum Sultan Iskandar Shah Kaddasullah (1910–1988), a princess of Perak's royal family.

A student of the Malay College Kuala Kangsar, he received diplomas in public administration from Worcester College, Oxford and the University of Exeter. He succeeded his father as sultan in 1974.

His election as the 7th Yang di-Pertuan Agong in 1979 was marked with controversy as he was said to be at odds with the incoming prime minister Mahathir Mohamad. However, the rumours proved to be untrue and he proved to be a keen admirer of the prime minister. Twenty-two years earlier, his father Abu Bakar had failed five times to be elected as the first Agong.

A controversial, headstrong personality, he has often forced his chief ministers in Pahang to resign over minor differences.

His favourite hobbies were playing football, golf, polo, and equestrian activities.

Sultan Ahmad Shah was a keen sportsman and was the President of the Malaysian Football Association (FAM) from 1984 until 2014, the President of Asian Football Confederation (AFC) until 2002 and Asean Football Federation (AFF) from 2011 until 2019.

His official and royal consort, Tengku Ampuan Afzan, a member of the Terengganu royal family, served as his Raja Permaisuri Agong but died of cancer on her return to Pahang on 29 June 1988. They had seven children, Tengku Meriam, Tengku Muhaini, Tengku Aishah Marcella, Al-Sultan Abdullah Ri'ayatuddin Al-Mustafa Billah Shah, Tengku Abdul Rahman, Tengku Nong Fatimah and Tengku Shahariah. Sultan Ahmad Shah's second wife Kalsom Abdullah (nee Anita), was designated as the Sultanah of Pahang in 1991. They then had a child, Tengku Fahad Mua'adzam Shah.

== Abdication and death ==
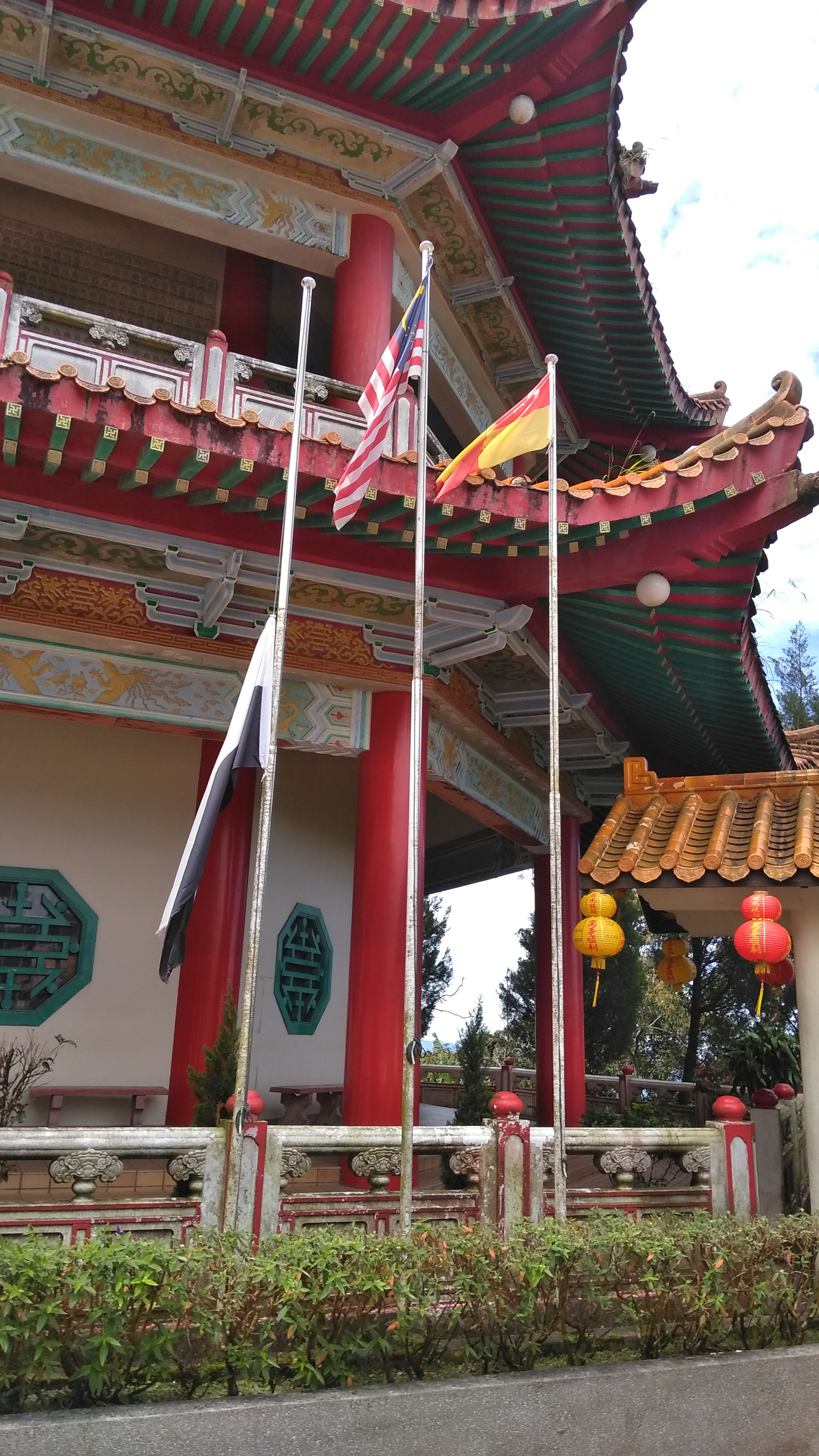
Flag of Pahang is flown at half-mast at the Chin Swee Caves Temple as a mark of respect to the late Sultan.

After being ill for some time, Sultan Ahmad Shah abdicated with effect from 11 January 2019 (when it was Pahang's turn to provide the Agong) upon the amendment of the state's constitution. On 22 May 2019, Sultan Ahmad Shah died at 8:50 am at the National Heart Institute, Kuala Lumpur at age 88. He was laid to rest next to the grave of his late wife, Tengku Ampuan Afzan at the Pahang Royal Mausoleum near Abu Bakar Royal Mosque in Pekan, Pahang. The state of Pahang observed 40 days of mourning, and Pahangese flags across the state were flown at half-mast, while all entertainment events for the next 3 days were cancelled.

== Issue ==
Name	Royal designation	Birth date	Birth Place	Death date	Death place	Marriage Date	Spouse	Their children	Their grandchildren
Tengku Meriam	Y.A.M Tengku Puteri Seri Lela Wangsa	1 April 1955 (age 71)	Istana Abu Bakar, Pekan, Pahang			24 April 1976 - Divorced	Tengku Dato’ Sri Kamil Ismail bin Tengku Idris Shah (divorced); Dato' Seri Mohamad Toufic Al-Ozeir	Y.M. Tengku Aidy Ahmad Shah; Y.M. Tengku Nurul Kamalia; Y.M. Tengku Madina Kamilia; Y.M Puteri Noor Afzan	Y.M Tengku Abdullah Amir Ahmad Shah; Puteri Nadra Raniya; Puteri Shakira Nurjenna
Tengku Muhaini	Y.A.M Tengku Puteri Seri Teja	31 October 1956 (age 70)	Istana Manggal Tunggal, Pekan, Pahang			22 January 1981 - Divorced	Tengku Dato’ Ibrahim Petra bin Tengku Indra Petra (divorced); Tan Sri Dato’ Sri Hj Affendi bin Hj Buang (Chief Of Defense Forces)	Puteri Munawwarah Syammiyah; Tun Putera Abdul Mubin Shah	
Tengku Aishah Marcella	Y.A.M Tengku Puteri Seri Kemala	13 November 1957	Istana Manggal Tunggal, Pekan, Pahang	26 August 2026 (aged 68)	Kuala Lumpur, Malaysia	23 October 1980 - Divorced, 2 July 1987	Tunku Kamil Ikram bin Tunku Abdullah (divorced); Dato’ Muhammad Johan bin Dato’ Muhammad Yusuf	Y.M. Tunku Shazwan Kaiyisha; Y.M Tun Putra Ahmad Aizuddin Shah; Y.M Putri Afzan Shakira Nabila	Tun Putra Shakeel Abdullah Shah; Tun Putera Khyrie Ahmad Shah; Puteri Khaira Layna; Puteri Sofia Khadijah Aishah
Tengku Abdullah	KDPB Sultan Pahang	30 July 1959 (age 67)	Istana Manggal Tunggal, Pekan, Pahang			6 March 1986, 1991	Tunku Azizah Aminah Maimunah Iskandariah binti Almarhum Baginda Al-Mutawakkil Alallah Sultan Iskandar Al-Haj; Che Puan Julia binti Abdul Rais	Y.A.M Tengku Amir Nasser Ibrahim (Adopted); Almarhum Y.A.M Tengku Ahmad Iskandar Shah (Died 24 July 1990); K.D.Y.M.M Tengku Hassanal Ibrahim Alam Shah; Y.A.M Tengku Muhammad Iskandar Ri'ayatuddin Shah; Y.A.M Tengku Ahmad Ismail Shah; Y.A.M Tengku Puteri Afzan Aminah Hafizatullah; Y.A.M Tengku Puteri Jihan Azizah Athiyatullah; Y.A.M Tengku Puteri Iman Afzan; Y.A.M Tengku Puteri Ilisha Ameera; Y.A.M Tengku Ilyana	Y.M Tengku Adam Ibrahim Shah; Y.M Tengku Sulaiman Abdullah Shah; Y.M Tengku Zayn Edin Shah; Y.M Tengku Nuh Muhammad Shah; Y.M Tengku Aleya Norlini
Tengku Abdul Rahman	Y.A.M. Tengku Muda	23 August 1960 (age 66)	Istana Manggal Tunggal, Pekan, Pahang			27 July 2002, 2012	Che Puan Muda Julita Aishah binti Abdul Latif; Che Puan Nur Bahiyah binti Mohd Akip	Y.M Tengku Eddie Akasya; Y.M Tengku Ahmad Firhan Shah; Y.M Tengku Ameera Asya; Y.M Tengku Armaan Alam Shah	
Tengku Nong Fatimah	Y.A.M Tengku Puteri Seri Lela Manja	4 September 1962 (age 64)					Dato’ Haji Muhammad Moiz	Y.M Puteri Suraiya Afzan; Tun Putera Yasir Ahmad Shah	Y.M Tengku Adam Ibrahim Shah; Y.M Tengku Sulaiman Abdullah Shah; Y.M Tengku Nuh Muhammad Shah
Tengku Shahariah	Y.A.M Tengku Puteri Seri Bongsu	12 September 1964 (age 62)					Dato' Baharim	Puteri Amida Afsha Afzan; Puteri Ameera Azwa Asyrah	
Tengku Fahad Mua'adzam Shah	Y.A.M. Tengku Arif Temenggong	10 February 1994 (age 32)							

== Awards and recognitions ==
=== Honours ===
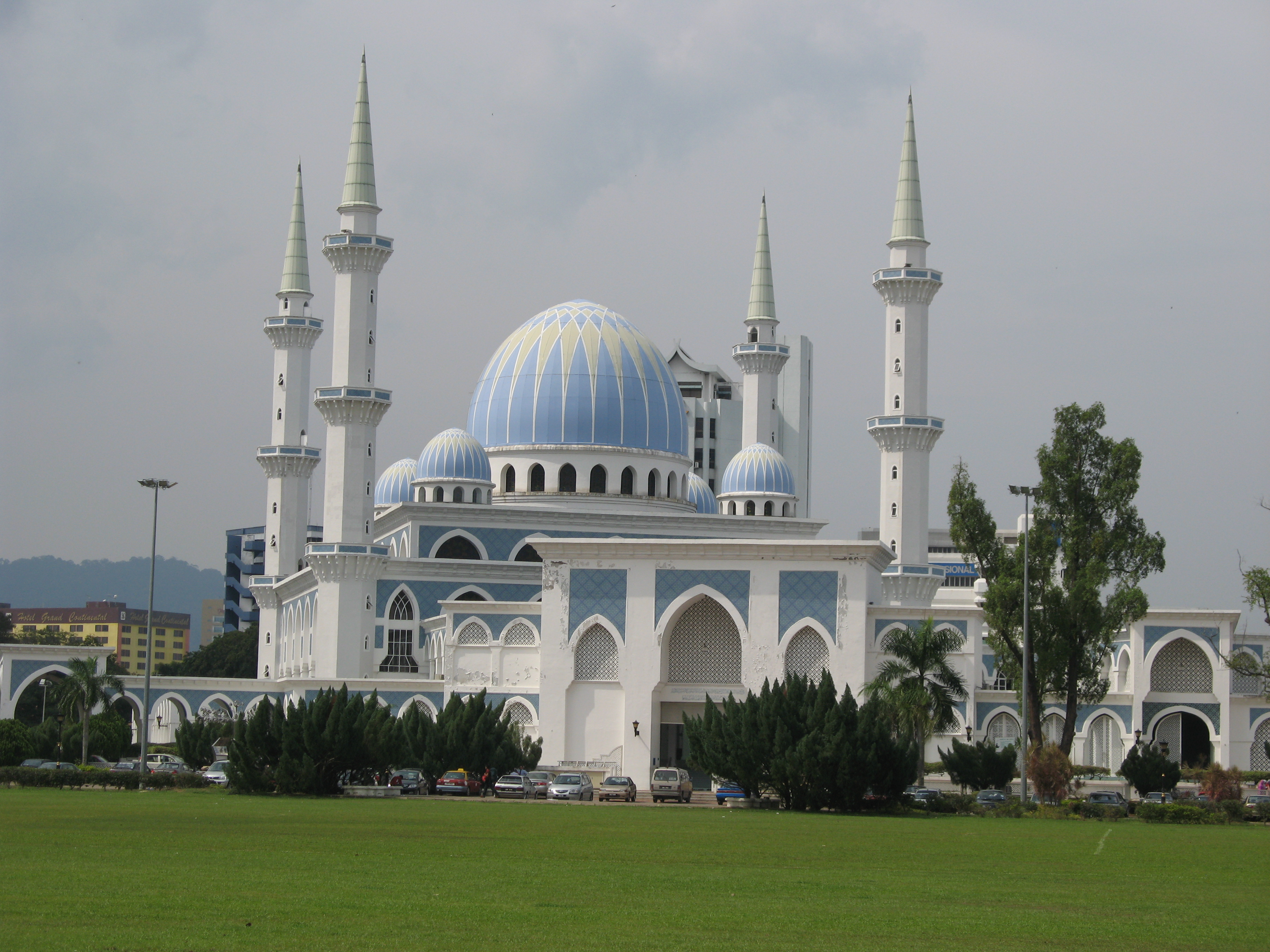
Building of the Sultan Ahmad Shah Mosque in Kuantan, Pahang

As the Yang di-Pertuan Agong from 1979 to 1984, Sultan Haji Ahmad Shah was automatically designated under constitutional provisions as the Supreme Commander of the Malaysian Armed Forces, holding the rank of the Field Marshal of the Royal Malaysian Air Force, Admiral of the Royal Malaysian Navy and Field Marshal of the Army.

Until he stepped down in 2019 he was the RMAF's Colonel in Chief and appeared at official RMAF ceremonies.

=== Honours of Pahang ===
- Pahang
  - Founding Grand Master and Member (DKP) of the Royal Family Order of Pahang (since 24 October 1977)
  - Grand Master and Member 1st class (DK I) of the Family Order of the Crown of Indra of Pahang (since 1974)
  - Founding Grand Master of the Grand Royal Order of Sultan Ahmad Shah of Pahang (SDSA, since 23 October 2010)
  - Founding Grand Master and Grand Knight of the Order of Sultan Ahmad Shah of Pahang (SSAP, since 24 October 1977)
  - Knight Companion (DIMP), Grand Knight (SIMP) and Grand Master of the Order of the Crown of Pahang (since 1974)
  - Sultan Abu Bakar Silver Jubilee Medal (24 June 1957)
  - Sultan Ahmad Shah Installation Medal (8 May 1975)
  - Sultan Ahmad Shah Silver Jubilee Medal (1999)

=== National ===
- Malaysia (as Yang di-Pertuan Agong, 29 March 1979 – 25 April 1984)
  - Recipient of Order of the Royal House of Malaysia (DKM)
  - Recipient (DMN) and Grand Master (1979-1984) of the Order of the Crown of the Realm
  - Grand Master (1979-1984) of the Order of the Defender of the Realm
  - Grand Master (1979-1984) of the Order of Loyalty to the Crown of Malaysia
  - Grand Master (1979-1984) of the Order of Merit of Malaysia
  - Grand Master (1979-1984) of the Order of Loyalty to the Royal Family of Malaysia
  - Courageous Commander of the Most Gallant Order of Military Service (PGAT) (1983)
- Johor
  - Recipient of Sultan Ibrahim Ismail Coronation Medal (23 March 2015)
  - Sultan Ismail Coronation Medal (10 February 1960)
  - Knight Grand Commander of the Order of the Crown of Johor (SPMJ) – Dato' (1972)
  - First Class of the Royal Family Order of Johor (DK I) (1 November 1975)
- Kedah
  - Member of the Royal Family Order of Kedah (DK)
- Kelantan
  - Recipient of the Royal Family Order of Kelantan (DK)
- Negeri Sembilan
  - Member of the Royal Family Order of Negeri Sembilan (DKNS)
- Perak
  - Knight Grand Commander of the Order of Cura Si Manja Kini (SPCM) – Dato' Seri (1970)
  - Member of the Royal Family Order of Perak (DK) (1975)
- Perlis
  - Recipient of the Perlis Family Order of the Gallant Prince Syed Putra Jamalullail (DK)
- Sarawak
  - Knight Grand Commander of the Order of the Star of Hornbill Sarawak (DP) – Datuk Patinggi (1982)
- Selangor
  - First Class of the Royal Family Order of Selangor (DK I) (1987)
- Terengganu
  - Member first class of the Family Order of Terengganu (DK I)

=== Foreign ===
- Argentina
  - Grand Cross of the Order of the Liberator General San Martín (26 September 2006)
- Brunei
  - Recipient of Royal Family Order of the Crown of Brunei (DKMB)
  - First Class of the Family Order of Laila Utama (DK) - Dato Laila Utama (1980)
- International Olympic Committee
  - Gold Olympic Order (1984)
- Kuwait
  - Collar of the Order of Mubarak the Great
- Romania
  - Star of the Socialist Republic of Romania 1st class (25 November 1982)
- Saudi Arabia
  - Badr Chain (January 1982)
- South Korea
  - Grand Order of Mugunghwa
- United Kingdom
  - Queen Elizabeth II Coronation Medal (2 June 1953)

=== Places named after him ===
- Sultan Haji Ahmad Shah Campus (Universiti Tenaga Nasional (UNITEN) branch campus) in Muadzam Shah, Pahang
- Sultan Haji Ahmad Shah Science Secondary School (SEMSAS), a secondary school in Kuantan, Pahang
- Sultan Haji Ahmad Shah Science School Pekan (SHAH Pekan), a secondary school in Pekan, Pahang
- Sultan Haji Ahmad Shah Al-Mustain Billah Vocational College, a vocational college in Kuala Lipis, Pahang
- Sultan Ahmad Shah Pahang Islamic University College (KUIPSAS)
- Sultan Ahmad Shah Polytechnic (POLISAS), a polytechnic in Kuantan, Pahang
- Ma'ahad As-Sultan Ahmad Shah Ad-Dini, a secondary school in Bandar Tun Razak, Jengka, Pahang
- Sultan Haji Ahmad Shah Al-Mustain Billah Mosque in Temerloh, Pahang
- Sultan Ahmad Shah Mosque in Kuantan, Pahang
- Sultan Ahmad Shah Bridge (Temerloh Bridge) on Federal Route 2 at Temerloh
- Sultan Ahmad Shah II Bridge (Semantan Bridge) on East Coast Expressway at Semantan
- Sultan Ahmad Shah III Bridge (Chenor Bridge) in Chenor, Pahang
- Jalan Sultan Ahmad Shah (formerly Northam Road) in George Town, Penang
- Jalan Sultan Haji Ahmad Shah, Kuala Lumpur (formerly Jalan Khidmat Usaha)
- Sultan Haji Ahmad Shah Airport, an airport in Kuantan, Pahang
- Sultan Haji Ahmad Shah Hospital (formerly Hospital Temerloh) in Temerloh, Pahang
- Sultan Haji Ahmad Shah Cup (Charity Shield Malaysia)
- Sultan Haji Ahmad Shah Mosque, International Islamic University Malaysia Gombak Campus
- Sekolah Sultan Haji Ahmad Shah, a primary school in Pekan, Pahang
- SMK Sultan Ahmad Shah, a secondary school in Cameron Highlands, Pahang
- Taman Pertanian Jubli Perak Sultan Haji Ahmad Shah in Kuantan, Pahang
- Pusat Jagaan Taman Pengasih Sultan Haji Ahmad Shah in Kuantan, Pahang
- Institut Latihan Sultan Ahmad Shah in Kajang, Selangor
- Pusat Kokurikulum Sultan Haji Ahmad Shah, Jabatan Pelajaran Negeri Pahang
- Dewan Jubli Perak Sultan Haji Ahmad Shah in Kuantan, Pahang
- Sultan Ahmad Shah International Convention Center (SASICC) in Kuantan, Pahang
- Akademi Maritim Sultan Ahmad Shah (AMSAS) in Kuantan, Pahang
- Pusat Pentadbiran Sultan Ahmad Shah (PPSAS) in Kuantan, Pahang

== Ancestry ==
Ancestors of Ahmad Shah of Pahang

8. Sultan Ahmad al-Muadzam Shah of Pahang (= 14)
4. Sultan Abdullah al-Mutasim of Pahang
9. Cik Kusuma binti Tok Minal Daeng Koro
2. Sultan Abu Bakar of Pahang
10. Yang Berbahagia Tun Abdullah, of Pulau Duyung (Terengganu)
5. Kalsum, of Pulau Duyung (Terengganu)
1. Sultan Ahmad Shah of Pahang
12. Sultan Idris Shah I of Perak
6. Sultan Iskandar of Perak
13. Cik Ngah Manah binti Manda Duwayat
3. Princess Fatima of Perak
14. Sultan Ahmad al-Muadzam Shah of Pahang (= 8)
7. Princess Nong Fatima of Pahang (half-sister of 4.)
15. Princess Fatima of Pahang (1st cousin of husband)

== Notes ==
Regnal titles
Preceded by Sultan Yahya Petra (Sultan of Kelantan)	Yang di-Pertuan Agong (King of Malaysia); 1979–1984	Succeeded by Sultan Iskandar (Sultan of Johor)
Preceded by Sultan Sir Abu Bakar Riayatuddin Al-Muadzam Shah ibni Almarhum Sultan Abdullah Al-Mutassimu Billah Shah	Sultan of Pahang; 1974–2019	Succeeded by Al-Sultan Abdullah Ria'yatuddin Al Mustafa Billah Shah ibni Sultan Ahmad Shah al-Musta'in Billah
Civic offices
Preceded by Hamzah Abu Samah	President of Asian Football Confederation; 1994–2002	Succeeded by Mohamed bin Hammam
