= Tengku Ampuan Afzan =

Raja Permaisuri Agong from 1979 to 1984

Afzan افزان
- Hajjah Afzan

Queen consort of Malaysia
- Reign: 26 April 1979 – 25 April 1984
- Installation: 10 July 1980
- Predecessor: Tengku Zainab
- Successor: Tengku Zanariah

Tengku Ampuan of Pahang
- Reign: 8 May 1974 – 29 June 1988
- Coronation: 6 May 1975
- Predecessor: Tengku Ampuan Fatimah
- Successor: Sultanah Kalsom (as Sultanah)
- Born: Tengku Afzan binti Tengku Muhammad; 4 December 1932; Kuala Terengganu, Terengganu, British Malaya (now Malaysia)
- Died: 29 June 1988 (aged 55); Istana Pahang, Kuala Lumpur, Malaysia
- Burial: 30 June 1988; Pahang Royal Mausoleum, Kuala Pahang, Pekan, Pahang, Malaysia
- Spouse: Ahmad Shah of Pahang (m. 1954)
- Issue: Tengku Meriam; Tengku Muhaini; Tengku Aishah Marcella; Tengku Abdullah; Tengku Abdul Rahman; Tengku Nong Fatimah; Tengku Shahariah
Regnal name
- Tengku Ampuan Hajah Afzan binti Almarhum Tengku Panglima Perang Muhammad
Posthumous name
- Marhumah Rahimahallah
- House: Bendahara of Pahang
- Religion: Sunni Islam

Tengku Ampuan Hajah Afzan Rahimahallah binti Almarhum Tengku Panglima Perang Tengku Muhammad (Jawi: تڠكو امڤوان حاجه افزان رحمة ﷲ بنت المرحوم تڠكو ڤڠليما ڤراڠ تڠکو محمد; born Tengku Afzan binti Tengku Muhammad; 4 December 1932 – 29 June 1988) was the Tengku Ampuan (Queen Consort) of Pahang. She served as the 7th Raja Permaisuri Agong (Queen of Malaysia) between 26 April 1979 and 25 April 1984.

== Early life ==
Born on 4 December 1932 in Kuala Terengganu, she was the fourth child of Tengku Panglima Perang Tengku Muhammad Mu’azzam Shah ibni Almarhum Sultan Haji Sir Ahmad al-Mu’azzam Shah and Tengku Hajah Mandak binti Tengku Haji Mustaffar, and the granddaughter of Almarhum Sultan Ahmad Shah, the first Sultan of Pahang.

Her father, the son of Sultan Ahmad of Pahang, served as Chief Minister of Terengganu and Pahang before returning to Pahang to hold the same post.

Tengku Hajah Afzan received her early education at the Malay Girls’ School in Pekan. She also received private tuition in English.

== Marriage and becoming queen ==
On 22 April 1954, at the age of 22, she married Ahmad Shah, Crown Prince of Pahang, at Kuala Lipis and became the Tengku Puan (Crown Princess) of Pahang. She gave birth to seven children, two boys and five girls, namely, Tengku Meriam, Tengku Muhaini, Tengku Aishah Marcella, Al-Sultan Abdullah Ri'ayatuddin Al-Mustafa Billah Shah, Tengku Abdul Rahman, Tengku Nong Fatimah and Tengku Shahariah.

In 1974 when Ahmad Shah ascended to the throne of Pahang, she became his queen consort styled as Tengku Ampuan of Pahang. She was Queen of Malaysia between 1979 and 1984.

== Death ==
Tengku Afzan died on 29 June 1988 at 8:42 am at Istana Pahang, Kuala Lumpur at the age of 55 due to cancer. She was laid to rest at the Pahang Royal Mausoleum near Abu Bakar Royal Mosque in Pekan, Pahang.

== Awards and recognitions ==
=== Honours of Pahang ===
- Member 1st class of the Family Order of the Crown of Indra of Pahang (DK I) (6 May 1975)
- Grand Knight of the Order of Sultan Ahmad Shah of Pahang (SSAP) – Dato' Sri
- Grand Knight of the Order of the Crown of Pahang (SIMP) – formerly Dato', now Dato' Indera (29 May 1972)

=== National and Sultanal honour ===
- Malaysia (as wife of the King of Malaysia, 29 March 1979 – 25 April 1984)
  - Recipient of the Order of the Crown of the Realm (DMN) (29 May 1979)

=== Foreign honour ===
- Romania
  - First Class of the Order of Tudor Vladimirescu (25 November 1982)

=== Places named after her ===
- Tengku Ampuan Afzan Mosque in Kuantan, Pahang
- Tengku Ampuan Afzan Hospital in Kuantan, Pahang
- Institut Tengku Ampuan Afzan, a child development centre in Kuala Lumpur
- Institut Pendidikan Guru Kampus Tengku Ampuan Afzan in Kuala Lipis, Pahang
- SM Tengku Ampuan Afzan, a secondary school in Chenor, Pahang
- SMK Tengku Afzan, a secondary school in Kuantan, Pahang
- SMKA Tengku Ampuan Hajjah Afzan, a secondary school in Jerantut, Pahang
- Maahad Tahfiz Al Quran Wal Qiraat Tengku Ampuan Afzan, Pekan, Pahang
- Taman Tengku Ampuan Afzan, a residential area in Lanchang, Pahang

== See also ==
- Raja Permaisuri Agong
- Yang di-Pertuan Agong

Malaysian royalty
Preceded by Tengku Zainab (Raja Perempuan of Kelantan)	Raja Permaisuri Agong (Queen of Malaysia)	Succeeded by Tengku Zanariah (Sultanah of Johor)
Preceded by Sultanah Fatimah	Sultanah of Pahang	Succeeded by Sultanah Kalsom
