= Abu Bakar Royal Mosque =

Mosque in Pekan, Pahang

- Masjid Diraja Abu Bakar مسجد دراج ابو بكر
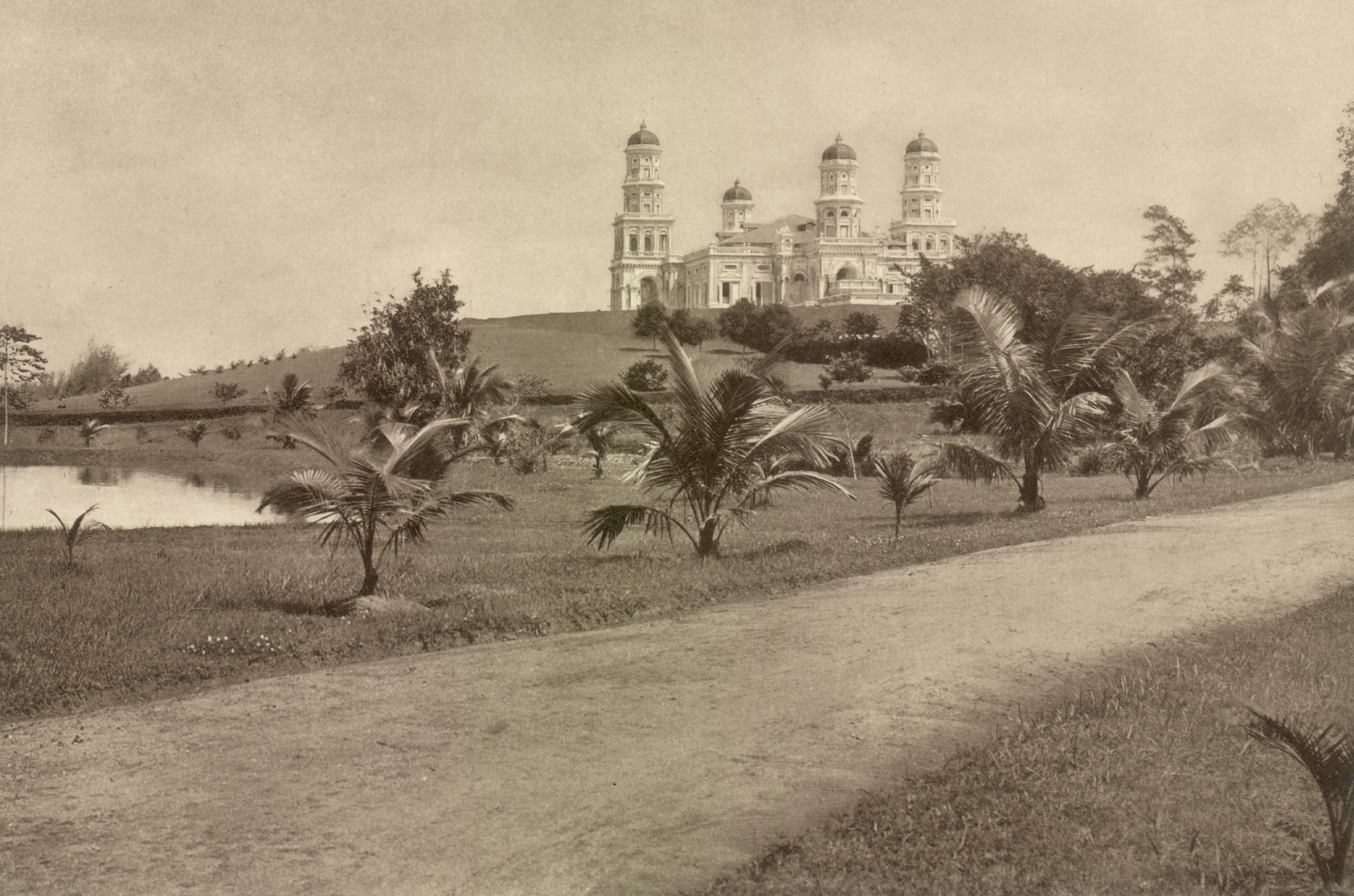

Religion
- Affiliation: Sunni Islam

Location
- Location: Pekan, Pahang, Malaysia
- Interactive map of Abu Bakar Royal Mosque

Architecture
- Type: Mosque

The Abu Bakar Royal Mosque (Malay: Masjid Diraja Abu Bakar) is a royal mosque located in Pekan, Pahang, Malaysia. It was officially opened in 1976 by Sultan Ahmad Shah of Pahang replacing the nearby Abdullah Mosque or Old Royal Mosque. Its interesting features include the royal mausoleum.

== Abdullah Mosque ==
The Abdullah Mosque, or the Old Royal Mosque, is an old royal mosque of Pahang located near royal mausoleum and the new mosque (Abu Bakar Royal Mosque). The mosque was built in 1928, after an 8-year construction period, during the reign of Sultan Abdullah Al-Mu’tassim Billah Shah and was officially opened on 8 January 1932 by Sultan Abu Bakar of Pahang on behalf of his father. It's named after the sultan who commissioned its construction. It may accommodate around 2000 worshippers in total at full capacity. Admission for getting in or seeing it is free. This cultural building is easily readable by foot, near Johor.

The Abdullah Mosque was constructed in Moorish style and was the principal mosque in Pekan for performing Friday prayers from 1932 until 1976.

== Graves ==
=== Graves of sultans ===
- Sultan Abu Bakar Riayatuddin al-Mu'azzam Shah ibni Almarhum Sultan Abdullah al-Mu'tassim Billah Shah (died 1974)
- Sultan Haji Ahmad Shah al-Musta’in Billah ibni Almarhum Sultan Abu Bakar Ri’ayatuddin al-Mu'adzam Shah (died 2019)

=== Graves of royal consorts ===
- Tengku Ampuan Besar Hajah Fatimah binti Almarhum Sultan Iskandar Shah (died 1988)
- Tengku Ampuan Hajah Afzan binti Almarhum Tengku Panglima Perang Tengku Muhammad (died 1988)

=== Graves of royal family members ===
- Tengku Muhammad ibni Almarhum Sultan Ahmad al-Muazzam Shah - Tengku Panglima Perang (died 1957)
- Tengku Putri Nur Aziah binti Almarhum Sultan Abu Bakar Riayatuddin al-Muadzam Shah (died 1972)
- Tengku Abdul Aziz ibni Almarhum Sultan Abdullah al-Mu'tassim Billah Shah - Tengku Arif Temenggung (died 1987)
- Tengku Ibrahim ibni Almarhum Sultan Abu Bakar Riayatuddin al-Muadzam Shah - Tengku Arif Bendahara (died 1987)
- Tengku Ahmad Iskandar Shah ibni Al-Sultan Abdullah Riayatuddin al-Mustafa Billah Shah (died 1990)
- Tengku Ahmad ibni Almarhum Sultan Abdullah al-Mu'tassim Billah Shah - Tengku Arif Temenggung (died 2000)
- Datin Rafeah binti Buang - Tok Puan Setia Perkasa and Malay singler (died 24 July 2002)
- Tengku Puteri Kamariah binti Almarhum Sultan Abu Bakar Riayatuddin al-Muadzam Shah (died 2006)
- Tengku Ainon Jamil binti Almarhum Sultan Abu Bakar Riayatuddin al-Muazzam Shah - Tengku Sri Nila Utama (died 2012)
- Tengku Ibrahim bin Tengku Sulaiman - Tengku Panglima Besar (died 2017)
- Tengku Abdullah ibni Almarhum Sultan Abu Bakar Riayatuddin al-Muazzam Shah - Tengku Arif Bendahara (died 2018)
- Tengku Haji Asmawi bin Tengku Haji Hussin - Orang Kaya Indera Segara (died 2020)
- Tengku Hajjah Aishah binti Almarhum Sultan Haji Ahmad Shah al-Musta’in Billah - Tengku Puteri Seri Kemala (died 2026)

== See also ==
- Islam in Malaysia
- Abidin Mosque
- Al-Muktafi Billah Shah Mosque
- Sultan Abdul Samad Mausoleum
- Sultan Sulaiman Mosque
- Shah Alam Royal Mausoleum
- Kedah Royal Mausoleum
- Kelantan Royal Mausoleum
- Pahang Old Royal Mausoleum
- Al-Ghufran Royal Mausoleum
- Johor Lama
- Jalan Kubor Cametery
- Mahmoodiah Royal Mausoleum
- Seri Menanti Royal Mausoleum
