= Mahmud Shah II of Pahang =

Sultan of Pahang (r. 1914–1917)

Mahmud Shah محمود شاه

Sultan of Pahang
- Reign: 13 April 1909 – 19 June 1917
- Installation: 29 May 1914
- Predecessor: Sultan Ahmad Al-Mu’azzam Shah
- Successor: Sultan Abdullah Al-Mu’tassim Billah Shah
- Born: 4 February 1868; Pekan, Pahang
- Died: 19 June 1917 (aged 49); Istana Sri Terentang, Tanjung, Kuala Pahang, Pahang
- Burial: 20 June 1917; Royal Cemetery, Kampung Marhum, Kuala Pahang, Pahang
- Spouse: Cik Hajjah Aminah binti Haji Abdul Halim; Tengku Ampuan Mariam Binti Al-Marhum Sultan Abu Bakar Al-Khalil Ibrahim Shah; Che Engku Umaiyah binti Tun Mansur
Names
- Kebawah Duli Yang Maha Mulia Paduka Seri Sultan Mahmud Shah Ibni Al-Marhum Sultan Ahmad Al-Mu’azzam Shah
- Father: Sultan Ahmad Al-Mu’azzam Shah Ibni Al-Marhum Bendahara Sewa Raja Tun Ali
- Mother: Cik Pah binti Arshad
- Religion: Sunni Islam

Sultan Mahmud Shah Ibni Al-Marhum Sultan Ahmad Al-Mu’azzam Shah (Jawi: سلطان محمود شاه ابن المرحوم سلطان أحمد المعظم شاه; 4 February 1868 – 19 June 1917) was the second modern sultan of Pahang reigning from 1914 to 1917. Born as Tun Mahmud, he was the second and eldest surviving son of Sultan Ahmad Muʽazzam by his second wife, Cik Pah binti Arshad.

== Life ==
Born at the Royal Palace, Pekan Lama, on 4 February 1868, as Tun Mahmud, he was the second and eldest surviving son of Sultan Ahmad Muʽazzam of Pahang, by his second wife, Cik Pah binti Arshad. Raised to the title of Tengku on 5 December 1884. His poor health prevented him from taking active part in affairs of the state following his accession, and he died in 1917, leaving no heir. He was succeeded by his brother, Abdullah al-Mu'tassim Billah of Pahang.

== Bibliography ==
- Ahmad Sarji Abdul Hamid (2011), The Encyclopedia of Malaysia, vol. 16 - The Rulers of Malaysia, Editions Didier Millet, ISBN 978-981-3018-54-9
