= Regalia of Malaysia =

Regalia of Supreme King of Malaysia and his consort

The regalia of Malaysia (Malay: Alat-alat Kebesaran Diraja Malaysia; Jawi: الت٢ كبسرن دراج مليسيا) includes all the items which are deemed sacred and symbolic of the supremacy and authority of the Yang di-Pertuan Agong (the Supreme King of Malaysia) and his consort, the Raja Permaisuri Agong. The installation of the Supreme King is normally held every five years, thus making it the only time the public can see the full set of regalia. Several pieces were made Malaysian National Treasures in 2009.

== The Throne ==
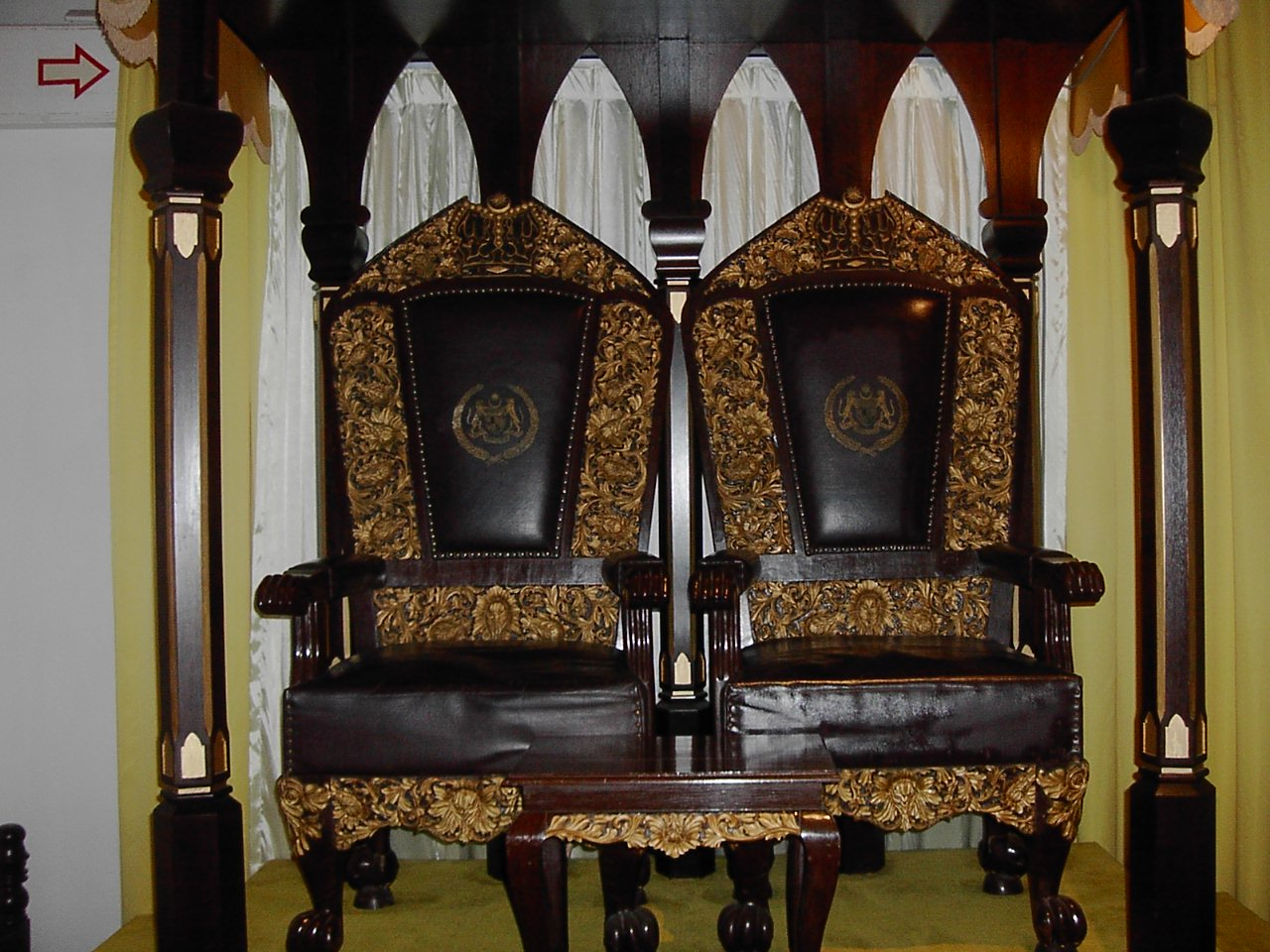
Replicas of the first thrones of the Yang di-Pertuan Agong and the Raja Permaisuri Agong, National History Museum, Kuala Lumpur

The Thrones housed in the Balairong Seri (Throne Room) of the Istana Negara feature a mixture of motifs from Peninsular Malaysia as well as Sabah and Sarawak.

The primary element is gold to impart a royal aura, and designs generally point upwards to indicate all beings are created by Allah.

== Tengkolok Diraja (Royal headdress) ==
According to legend, the first Sultan of Perak, Sultan Muzaffar Shah I Ibni Almarhum Sultan Mahmud Shah (1528–1549) set sail to establish the Perak Sultanate. Sultan Muzaffar was of the Malacca Sultanate, and had been exiled to Johor by the Portuguese. He carried on his ship many of the regalia of Malacca, including the Royal Crown of Malacca.

During his journey, his ship entered shallow waters and was stuck, the only solution being to reduce the ship's load. One by one, the many items on board were cast into the sea, but the ship would not budge. The only object left was the Royal Crown of Malacca, which was then offered to the waters. The sea was happy with this, for immediately after the ship miraculously set sail on its own to Perak.

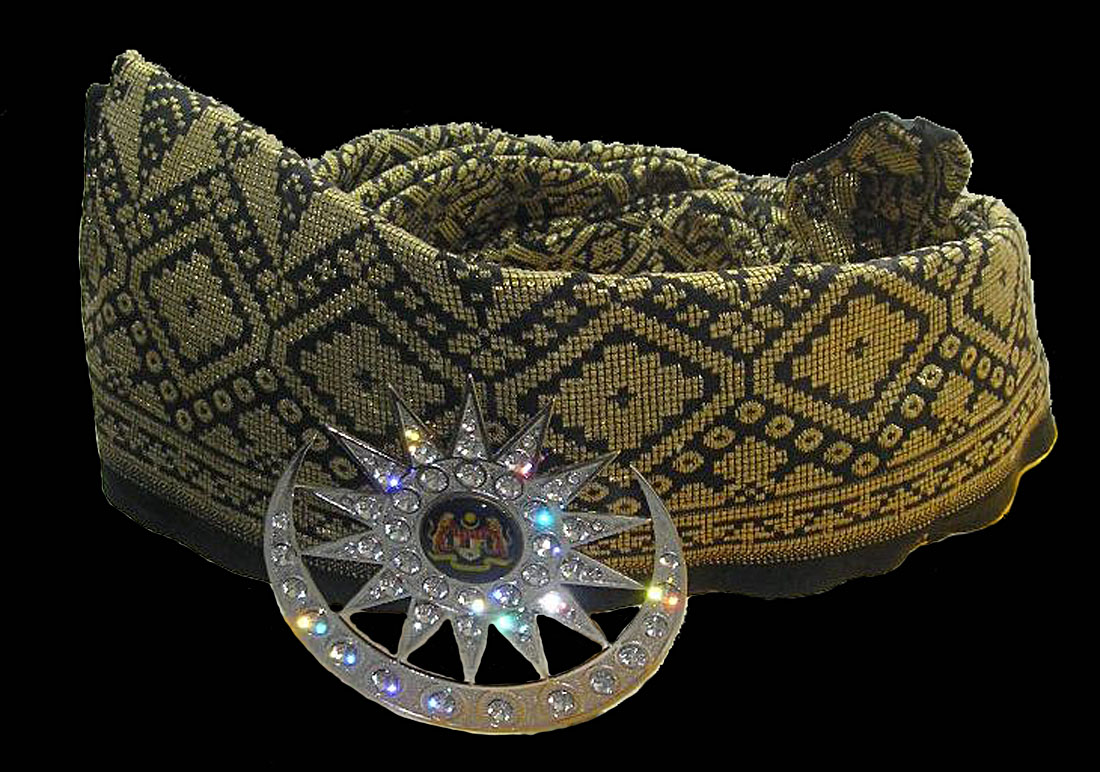
Copy of the royal headgear, Muzium Negara, Kuala Lumpur

The Sultan took this as a sign, and swore that he and his descendants would never wear a crown during their installation. This practice came to be followed by other Malay Rulers. Thence, the Malay headdress known as the Tengkolok came to be the replacement for a crown.

For centuries, the Malay Rulers have worn headdresses as part of their regalia. These are made of embroidered silk folded in different styles since the days of the Malay Sultanate. The style of folding is called solek, and there are variations depending on the tradition of the royal family of a particular state. The colour of the headdress also varies from one state to another. However two of the royal states in Peninsular Malaysia - Selangor and Johor - have since added a crown to their regalia following British influence.

The royal headdress worn by the King of Malaysia during his installation ceremony is called the Tengkolok Diraja. Made of black fabric embroidered with gold thread, it is folded in the Dendam Tak Sudah ("Persistent Vengeance") style from the state of Negeri Sembilan (which also inspired the elective monarchical system itself). Affixed to the front of Tengkolok Diraja is the Bintang Persekutuan (Federation Star), a bejewelled ornament consisting of a crescent moon and a 14-point star. At the centre of the star is the Coat of arms of Malaysia. The Tengolok is worn together with the Muskat.

== Muskat ==
The royal attire of the King for the installation ceremony and other events is the Muskat, King's Royal Dress. The origin of the Muskat can be traced to the ancient kingdom of Muscat, in present-day Oman. Originally, the Muskat was worn by government officials of Kedah.

The Muskat was first worn in 1960, at the installation of the third King of Malaysia, Almarhum Tuanku Syed Putra ibni Almarhum Syed Hassan Jamalullail, in Jalan Ampang - the then royal audience hall in the capital. It was the introduced by Tunku Abdul Rahman Putra Al-haj, Malaysia's first prime minister, who was a prince of the Kedah royal house.

The Muskat is made of black wool embroidered with gold thread, in the pattern of the hibiscus, Malaysia's national flower. The dress is worn with headdress and embroidered long trousers at ceremonies to mark the King's installation, official birthday, official visits to the states and territories, and during the State Opening of Parliament. Past Hari Merdeka celebrations saw various other appearances of this dress.

== Royal buckle ==
The Pending Diraja or Royal Buckle Belt is made of pure gold and decorated with eleven rubies. The engraved centrepiece features the Malaysian federal arms surrounded by a gold wreath. The belt is made of heavy ribbed silk, embroidered with floral motifs in gold thread. The Buckle is worn with the Muskat by the King in days wherein it is worn.

== Royal blades ==
The most revered item in the Malay royal regalia is the keris. Two of these, the Keris Pendek Diraja and Keris Panjang Diraja are among the Royal Regalia worn by the King and are worn with his ceremonial Muskat.

=== Keris Pendek Diraja ===
Keris Pendek Diraja or Royal Short Keris is the short keris made from the steel blades of older keris from the royal states of the peninsula. It has an ivory hilt coloured white and a gold-decorated sheath. The hilt is called Hulu Pekaka and shaped like the head of the legendary Garuda bird. The Federation Crest is embossed on the crosspiece of the sheath. It can only be carried or worn by the reigning King of Malaysia with the Muskat.

=== Keris Panjang Diraja ===
The Keris Panjang Diraja is the most important symbol of authority during the installation ceremony. The Keris Panjang Diraja or Government Keris symbolises regal power and authority and is thus the image of the continuing pictorial traditions of royalty in Malaysia of the royal ruler being historical warrior chief of his territory, as well as the King's constitutional duty as Commander in Chief of the Armed Forces. Both its hilt and sheath are covered in gold plating. The crosspiece of the keris is engraved with the Coat of arms of Malaysia and the heraldic arms of the eleven states of Peninsular Malaysia.

The blade itself was forged from steel taken from eleven keris from each of the eleven states. The hilt of the keris is in the form of a horse's hoof with decorations resembling the jering (Archidendron jiringa) fruit. This keris is worn by the reigning King only on certain occasions with the Muskat, and is kissed as a form of reverence during his installation day.

== Gendik Diraja (Royal tiara) ==
The Gendik Diraja or Royal Tiara is worn solely by the Queen during royal ceremonies (in certain cases with hijab) and on the day of her husband's official installation.

The Gendik is made of platinum and studded with diamonds. It is designed to come apart to form a locket and two brooches.

== Kalung Diraja (Royal Necklace) ==
The Kalung Diraja or Royal Necklace is made of platinum and studded with diamonds. As with the Tiara, the Kalung can be separated into a pair of earrings, brooches, and kerabu (a traditional ornament for the ears). It is solely worn by the Queen.

== Cogan (Sceptres) ==
These two large sceptres or maces form part of the royal regalia and are carried by attendants in state ceremonies escorting the King and Queen.

=== Cogan Alam ===
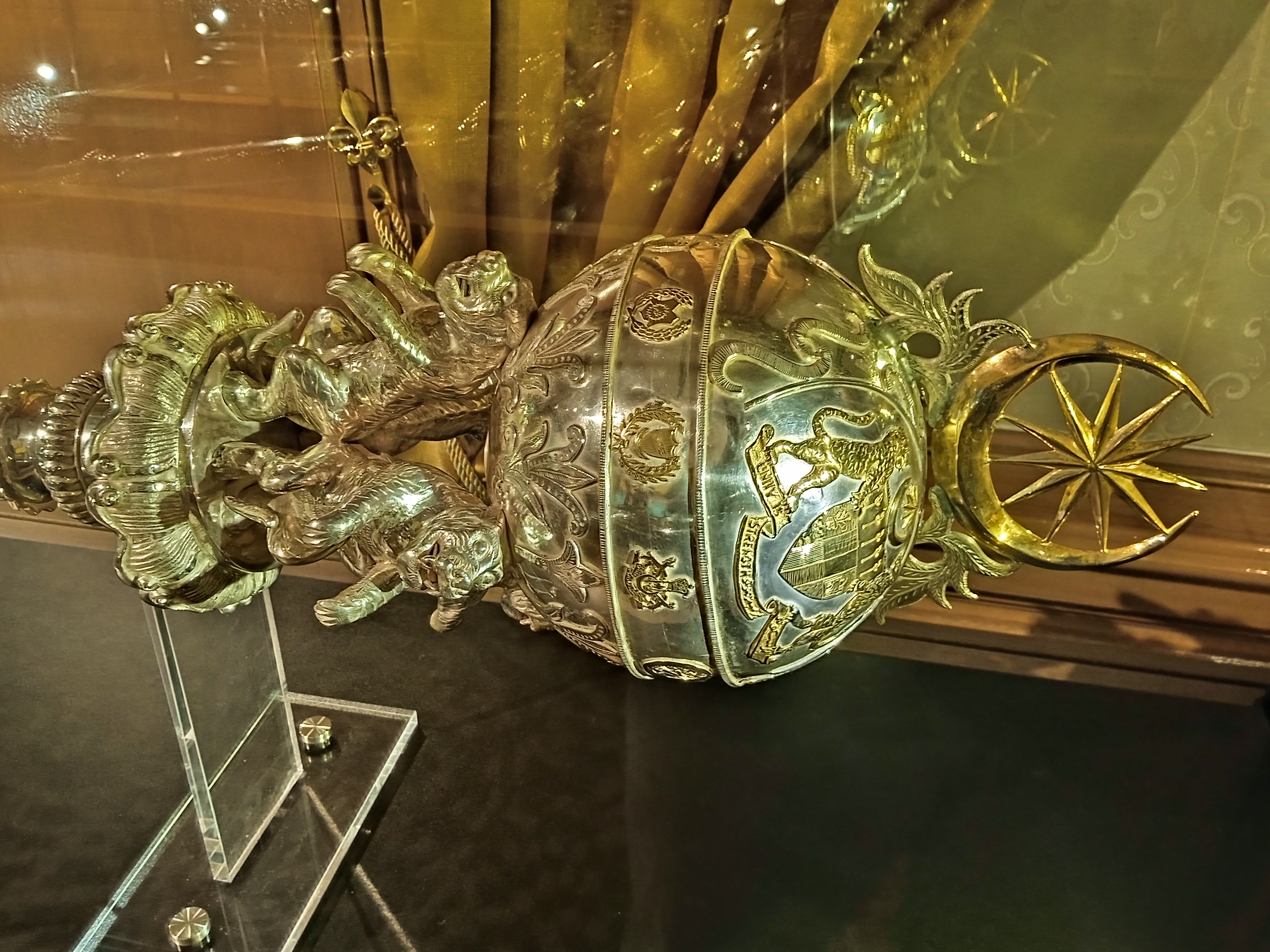
Cogan Alam

The Cogan Alam ("Sceptre of the Universe") is part of the Royal Regalia. This silver ceremonial mace symbolises power and is 162.66 cm long. It consists of an orb mounted on a long shaft. The orb is topped by a crescent and an eleven-pointed gold star. Around the equator of the orb, the crests of the eleven Peninsular Malaysian states are embossed in gold while the federal heradic arms also embossed similarly is above it. The orb is supported by four tigers while the shaft itself is decorated with six padi stalks in gold.

=== Cogan Agama ===
The 155.04 cm long Cogan Agama ("Sceptre of Religion") is also made of silver. It consists of a large, conical-shaped head with a golden, five-pointed star and a silver crescent mounted on a long shaft. Quranic verses are embossed on the head and shaft. It is a reminder of the King's role as Head of Islam and Defender of the Faith.

== Mace ==
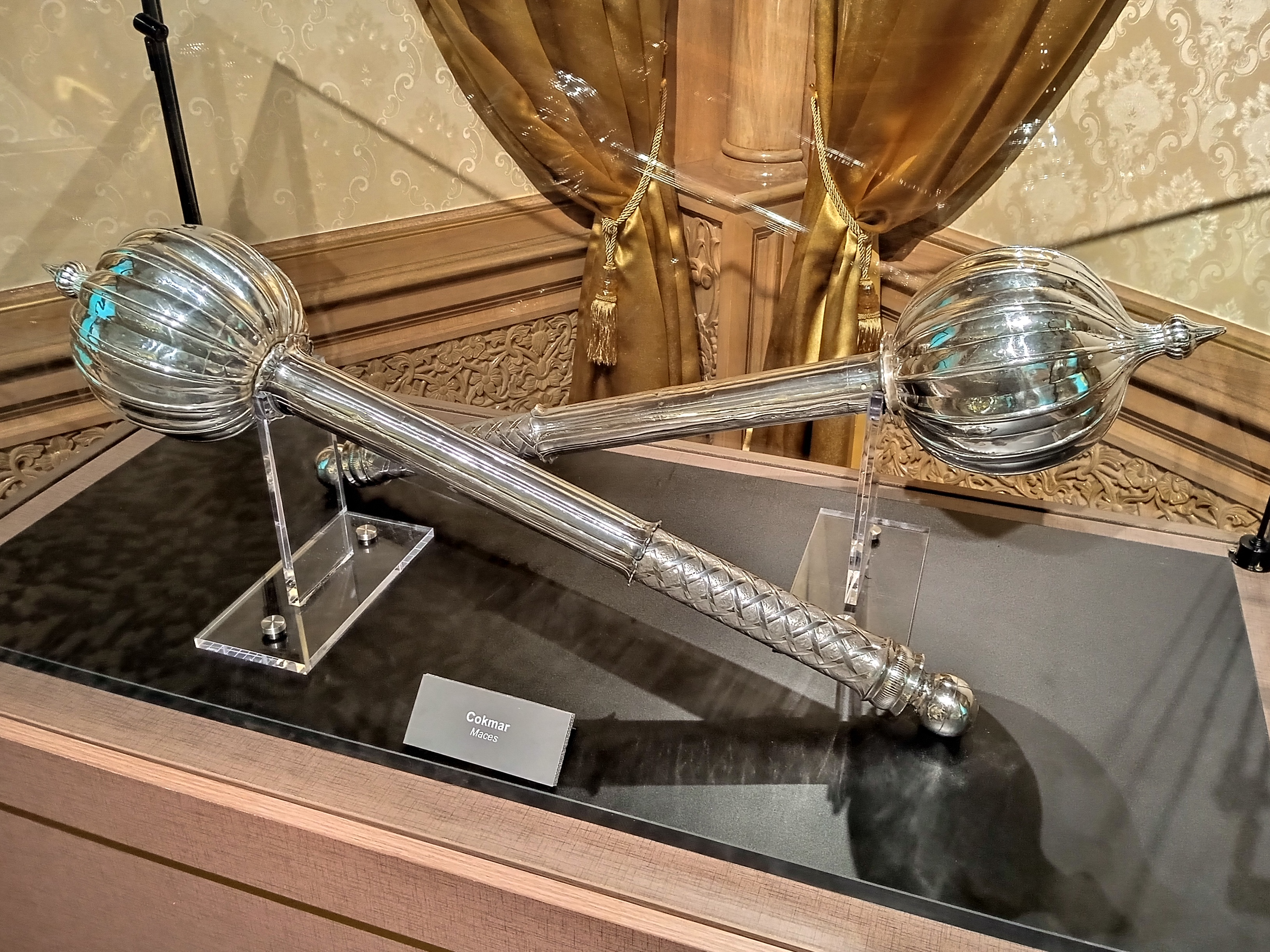
Cokmar

The Cokmar, or War Clubs, or Mace are another symbol of power and part of the panoply of authority of the Malaysian Government. The pair of Cokmar are made of silver. Each is 81.32 cm long and consists of a circular, fluted orb made of plain silver and mounted on a short shaft, also made of silver. Attendants carrying the War Clubs in royal ceremonies walk after the bearers of the Sceptres.

== Other regalia ==
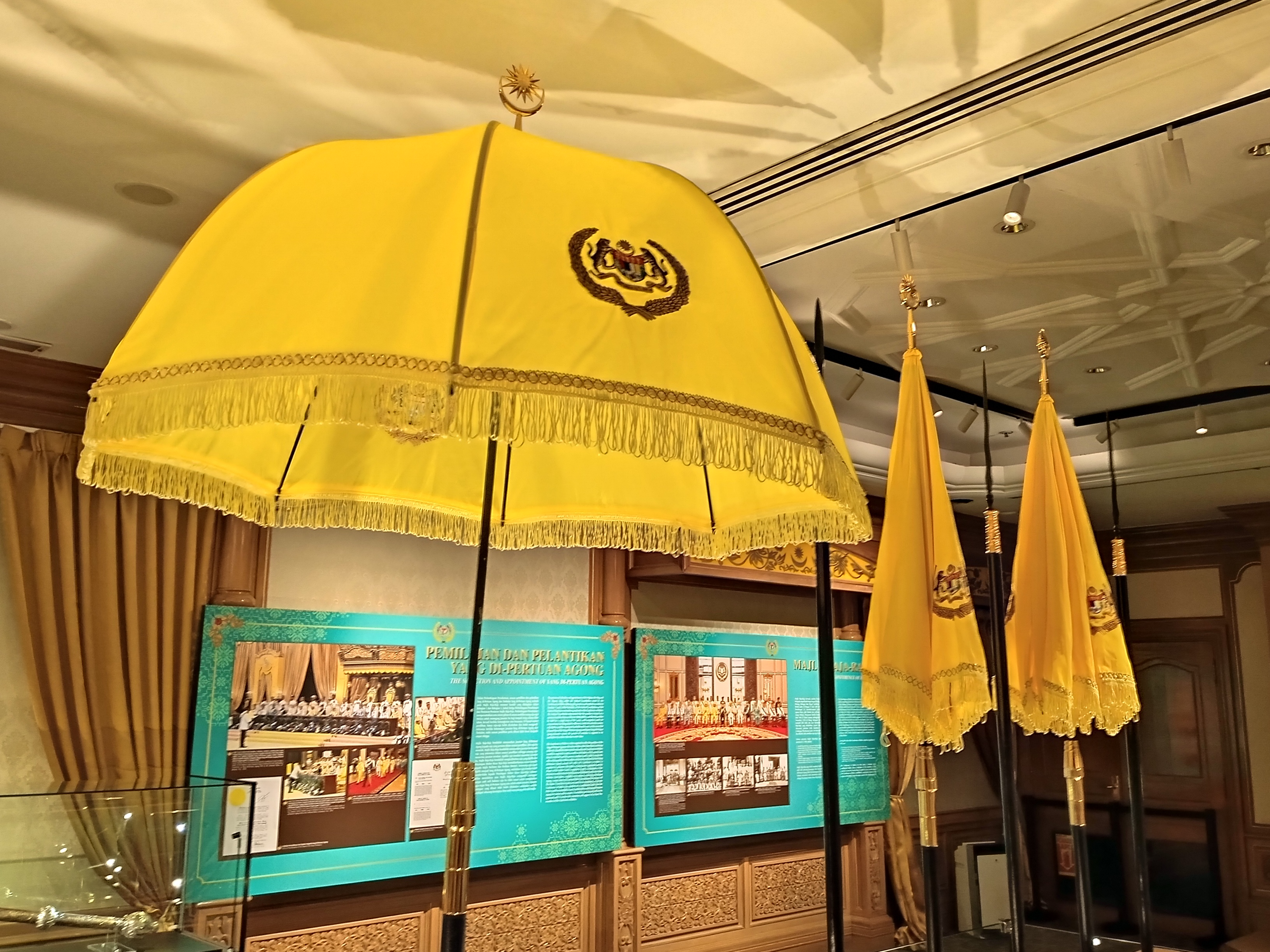
Payung ubur-ubur kuning and tombak berambu

Other components of the Royal Regalia are the Pedang Diraja (Royal Swords), Keris Panjang Diraja (Long Keris) and Sundang Diraja (Royal Sword-Keris). The Keris, Pedang and Sundang are traditional Malay weapons that have become symbols of royalty. They have silver-gilt hilts and sheaths, however some hilts are black. The Payung Ubur-Ubur Kuning (Yellow Jellyfish Umbrellas) are 20 in number, and made of silver. Yellow symbolises royalty and is reserved for royal personages. The Royal Yellow Umbrellas are each tipped a finial of an eleven-pointed star and crescent. These are used in public events outdoors. The Tombak Berambu (Fringed Spears) are also 20 in number, and have blades with three, curved indentations. They are made from ancient spears given by the eleven states of Peninsular Malaysia. These are brown colored and the blade is in silver.

== Nobat ==
Musical instruments for nobat
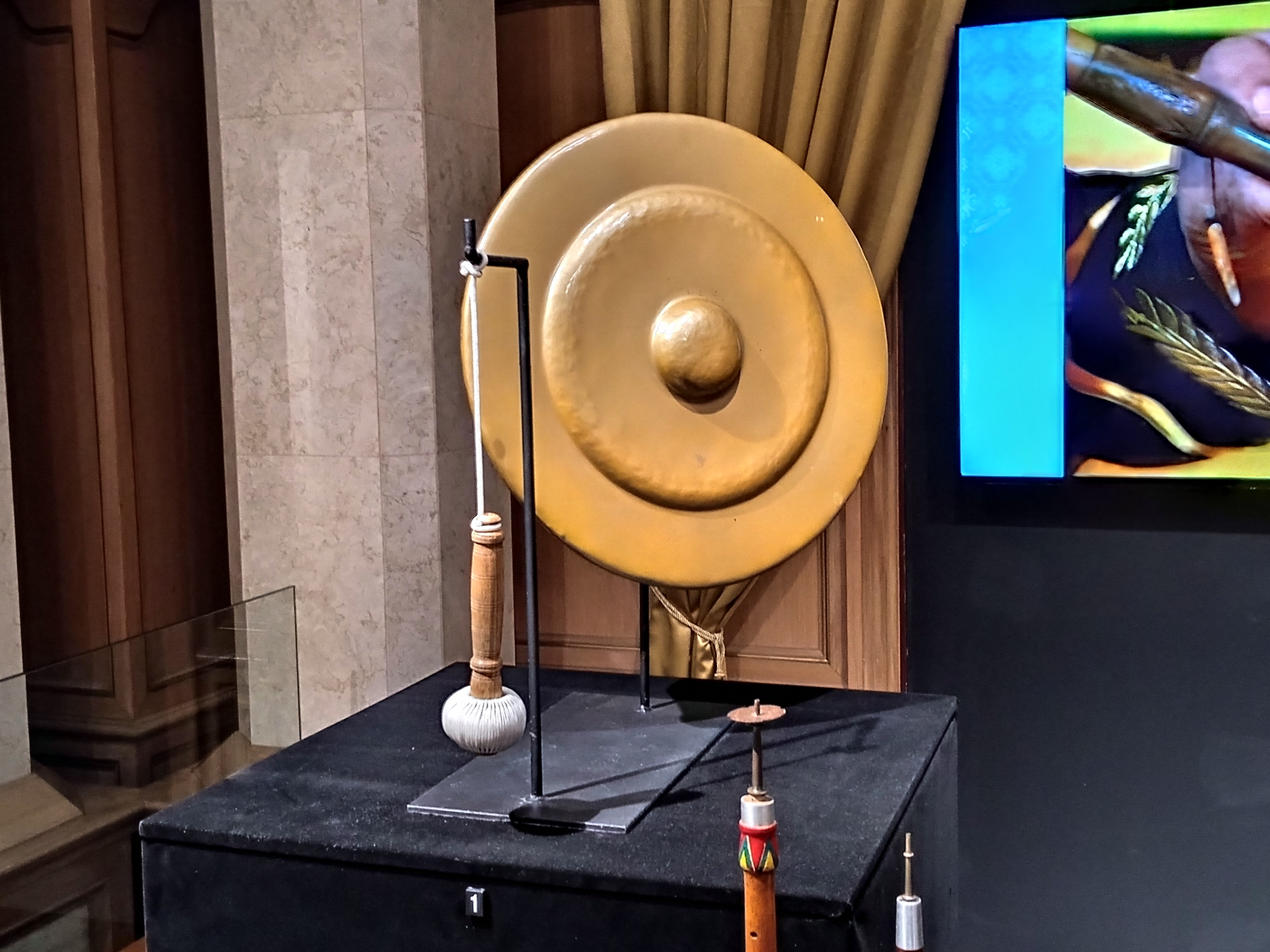
Gong

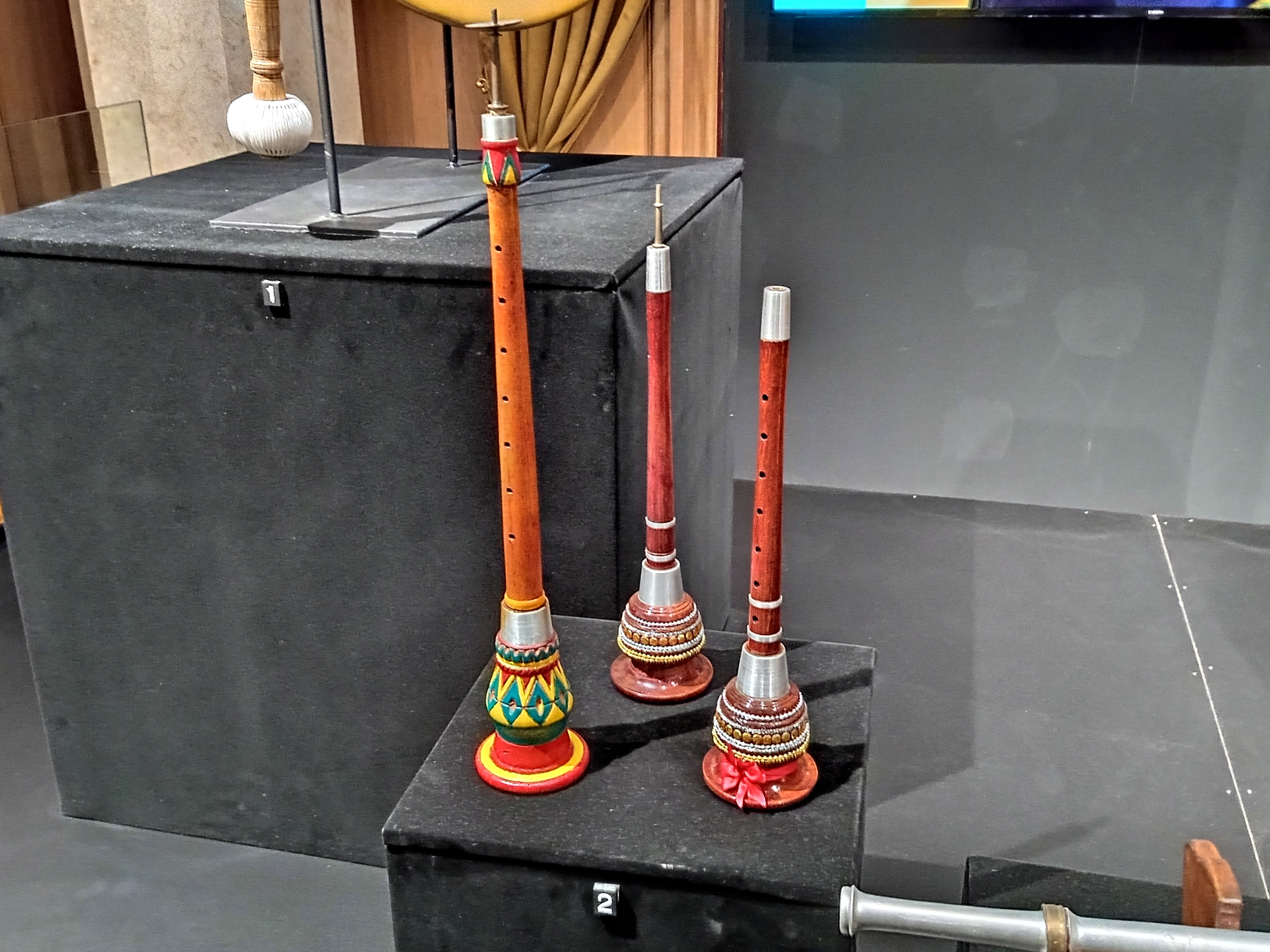
Seruling

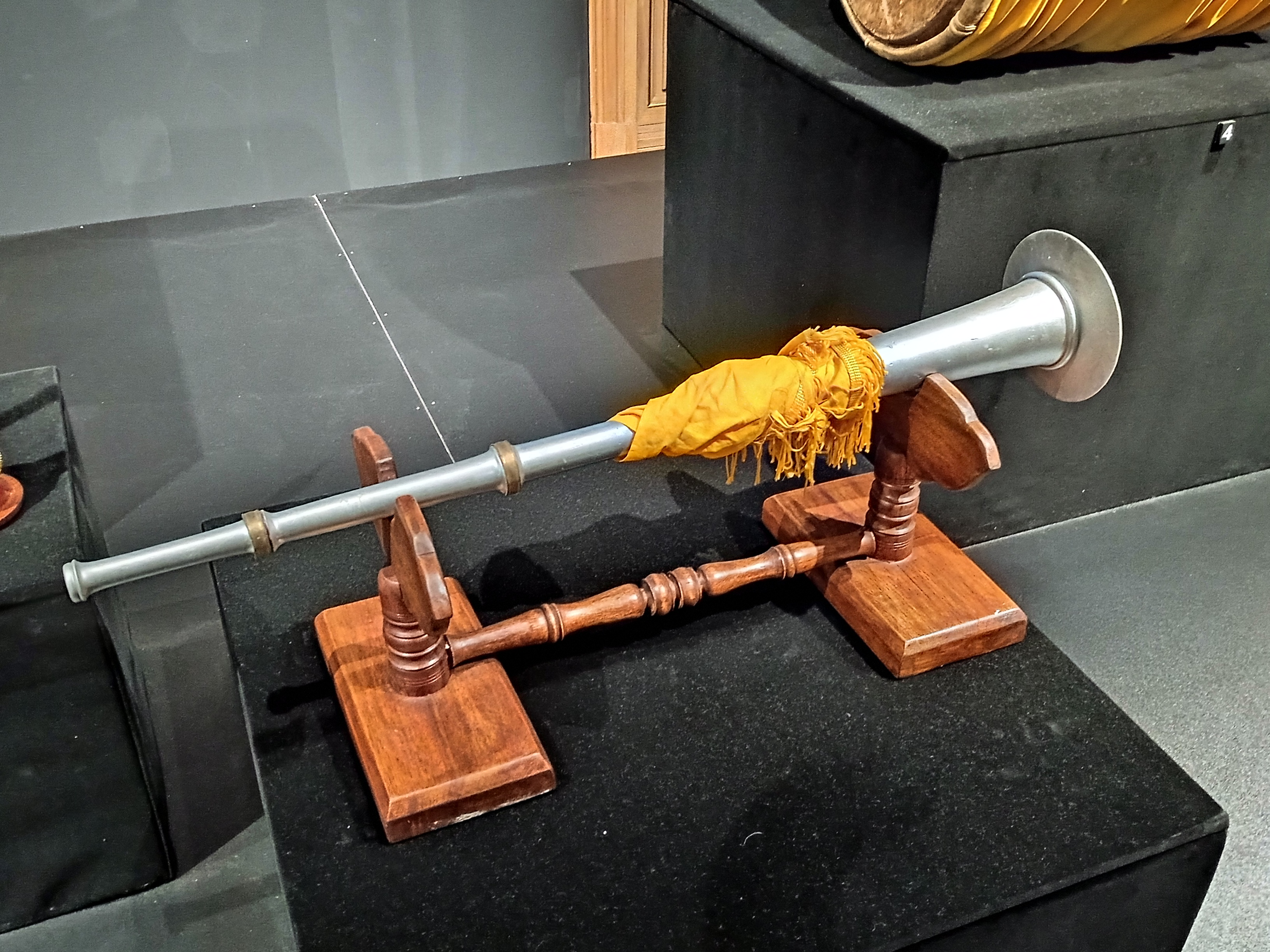
Nafiri

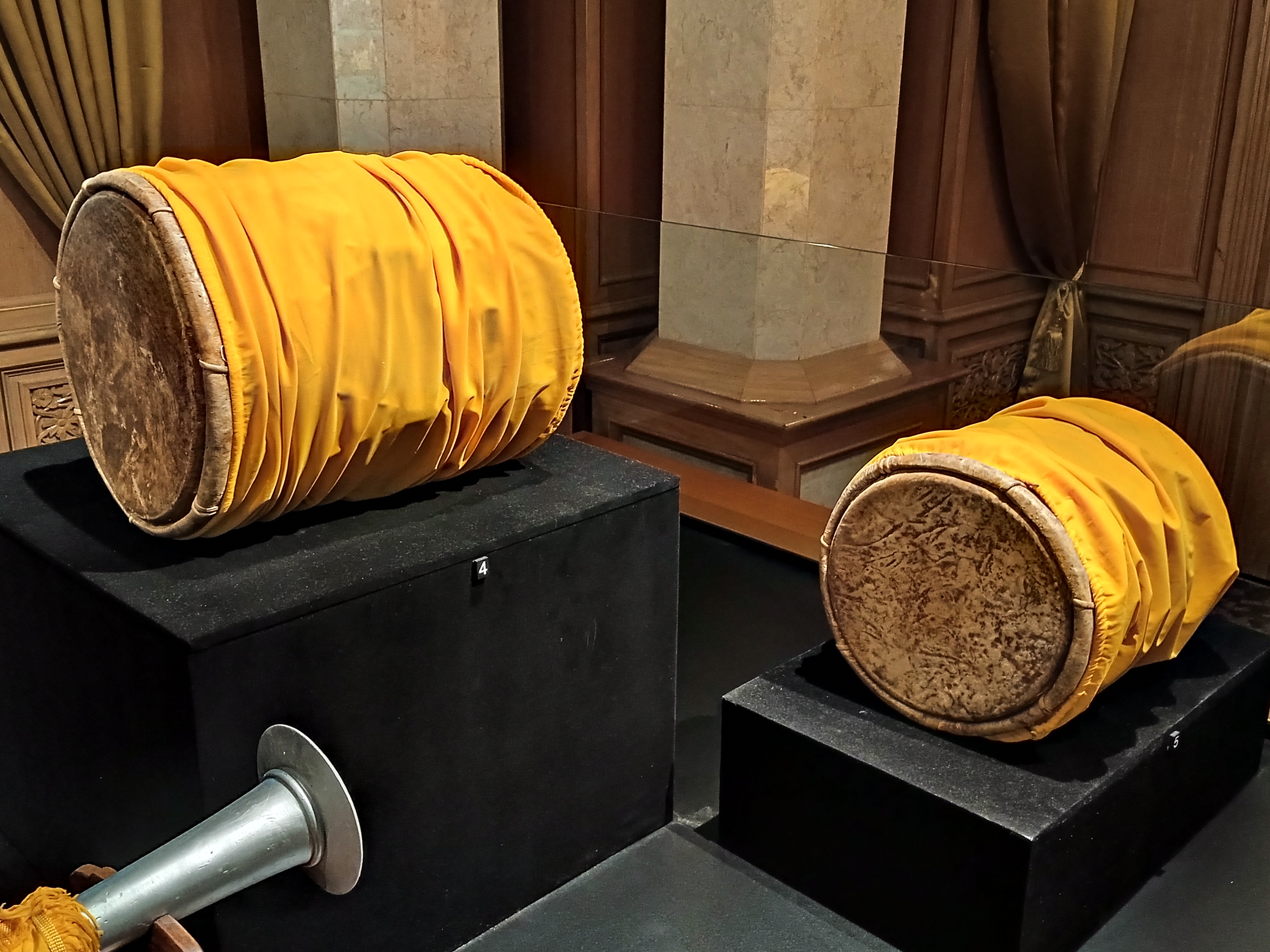
Gendang anak and gendang ibu

The Nobat or Royal Musical Ensemble is a form of traditional Malay music and is considered part of the Royal Regalia. The Nobat only plays on special occasions like the Installation of the Yang di-Pertuan Agong, the investitures of the other Malay Rulers, the King's Official Birthday, and other royal ceremonies including weddings, births and funerals. The ensemble originated in the 15th century.

The term originates from the Persian word naubat, which means nine types of instruments. Currently, only Terengganu, Kelantan, Kedah, Perak and Selangor maintain Nobat ensembles, with the instrumentation differing by state. The Kedah and Perak ensembles are the oldest in the federation, while those of Terengganu and Selangor use loaned sets (the former from the Riau-Lingga Sultanate, last used there in 1910, and the latter a complete set from Perak given when the state's first ruler was enthroned). Kelantan's ensemble, reformed in 2016, is the youngest (existing since the early 20th century). It is termed Pasukan Gendang Besar Diraja only in that state, unlike the four others which are titled nobat.

A typical arrangement has five instruments:

- Gendang Negara ("state" kettledrum)
- Gendang Ibu ("mother" drum, double-headed)
- Gendang Anak ("child" drum, double-headed and slightly smaller than the Gendang Ibu)
- Serunai (oboes or clarinets), one to two in number
- Nafiri (trumpet)

The ensembles of Perak and Selangor have identical instrumentation, while the Kedah Nobat includes a wooden rod covered with yellow cloth (Mahaguru) and a medium-sized, mounted gong. The Terengganu ensemble possesses an additional set of silver clash cymbals. Kelantan's, while omitting the nafiri, has an additional serunai plus two rebab lutes, two large gongs, and two more Gendang Anak.

During the installation ceremony of the Yang Di-Pertuan Agong, the Nobat orchestra will play the tune Raja Berangkat (The King Arrives / Departs) as he and his consort enters the Balairong Seri, the same song is played when they depart. When the installation regalia are brought in, the ensemble will play the tune Menjunjung Duli. The climax of the ceremony is when the Yang Di-Pertuan Agong reads the Installation Oath, after which the tune Raja Bertabal (The King is Installed) is heard. These three tunes have their own names in their home states. For example, in Kedah, they are known as: Belayar (Sailing), Palu [(The Drums are) Beaten] and Perang (War) respectively - while in Terengganu, the songs are played to the melody of Iskandar Shah (King Alexander), Palu-Palu Melayu [(The) Malay (drums are) Beaten] and Ibrahim Khalil [Abraham, friend (of God)].

Each state with the nobat has their own repertoire of tunes. The Kedah ensemble has 19 surviving pieces (more than in the other ensembles), while Perak and Selangor share the same 16 songs, 13 in the Terengganu nobat and 8 songs in Kelantan's. The leader and conductor of a Nobat ensemble is responsible for the musicians under him, and for the care and maintenance of the instruments. The positions of the musicians are hereditary by custom; the Perak and Selangor musicians are hired from the same clan known as Orang Kalur. Although the Kedah musicians are also known as Orang Kalur, it is not currently known how, or whether or not they are related. One of the taboos in these 3 ensembles is that those who are not from the Orang Kalur clan are forbidden to play or even touch these instruments, for they are considered sacred. This is also attributed to the belief that the instruments are home to guardian spirits (penunggu). The nobat has a significant relationship to the Sultan's daulat (sovereignty, inner aura or spirit); the greater his daulat, the grander and more haunting the sounds produced will be.

While the ensembles of Selangor, Terengganu, and Kelantan play only at official occasions, the Kedah ensemble plays every day before prayer hours and during holidays and celebrations. In Perak, the nobat is also sounded during days of Islamic significance: the last 3 afternoons before and final 6 nights of Ramadhan, the eve of Eid-ul-Fitr, 3 consecutive afternoons before Eid-ul-Adha, and the mornings of those two days, including the arrival and departure of the Sultan of Perak at the Ubudiah Mosque to perform the congregational Eid prayers.

== Literature ==
- bin Haji Taha, Adi (2004). Pameran Raja Kita. Kuala Lumpur: Department of Museums and Antiquities, Malaysia. ISBN 967-9935-17-5.
