= Abu Bakar of Pahang =

Sultan of Pahang (r. 1932–1974)

Abu Bakar أبو بکر
- Al Mu'adzam (The Exalted One)
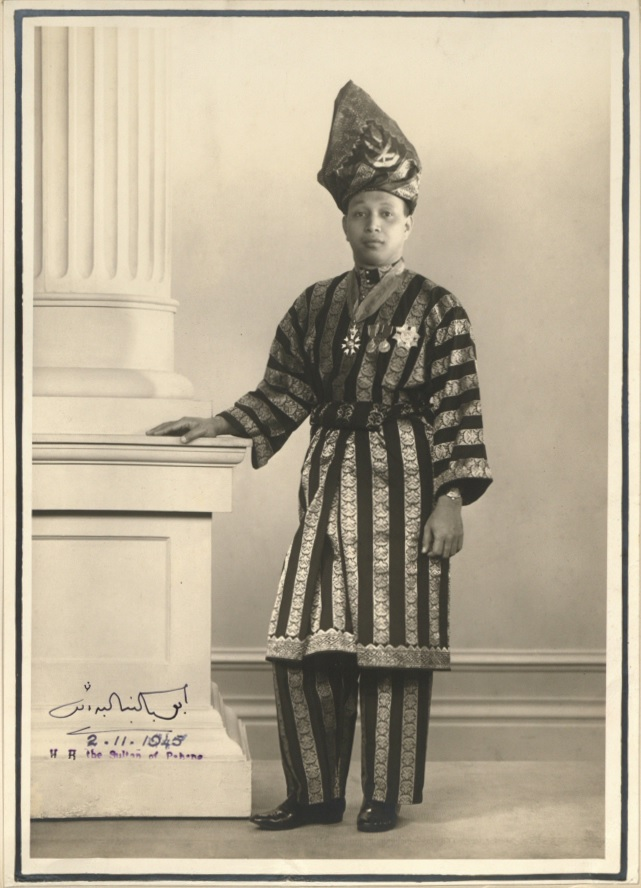

Sultan of Pahang
- Reign: 22 June 1932 – 5 May 1974
- Installation: 28 May 1933
- Predecessor: Sultan Abdullah Al-Mu’tassim Billah Shah
- Successor: Sultan Haji Ahmad Shah Al-Musta’in Billah
- Menteri Besar: See List: Mahmud Mat; Tengku Mohamad Sultan Ahmad; Abdul Razak Hussein; Raja Abdullah Tok Muda Ibrahim; Wan Abdul Aziz Ungku Abdullah; Yahya Mohd Seth; Abdul Aziz Ahmad
- Born: 29 May 1904; Istana Hinggap, Pekan, Pahang, Federated Malay States, British Malaya
- Died: 5 May 1974 (aged 69); Istana Peninjau, Kampung Padang Polo, Pekan, Pahang
- Burial: 7 May 1974; Abdullah Mosque, Pekan, Pahang
- Spouse: Raja Fatimah Binti Al-Marhum Sultan Iskandar Shah Kaddasullah; Che Siti Nah; Tengku Hajjah Azam Binti Tengku Setia Raja Omar; Che Mek Mas; Che Hafsah Binti Imam Mat; Che Siti Zainab Binti Sheikh Ahmad; Che Hathifah Binti Abdul Rashid Alias; Maria Menado
- Issue: Tengku Ahmad Shah; Tengku Nur Azhan; Tengku Ainon Jamil; Tengku Puteri Mariam; Tengku Puteri Nur Aziah; Tengku Tan Sri Ibrahim; Tengku Tan Sri Abdullah; Tengku Ismail; Tengku Abdul Aziz; Tengku Tan Sri Azlan; Tengku Azman; Tengku Abdul Rahman; Tengku Abdul Rashid; Tengku Kamal Baharin; Tengku Zaiton; Tengku Putri Kamariah; Tengku Intan Badariya; Tengku Nong Suraya; Tengku Nur Azahar; Tengku Faridah; Tengku Nur Aizah; Tengku Nur Akmar; Tengku Zabedah; Tengku Nina; Tengku Omar; Tengku Muhammad; Tengku Sulaiman; Tengku Kalsum Suzanne; Tengku Idris; Tengku Baharuddin; Tengku Nur Ashikin
Names
- Sultan Abu Bakar Ri’ayatuddin Al-Mu’azzam Shah Ibni Al-Marhum Sultan Abdullah Al-Mu’tassim Billah Shah
- House: Bendahara
- Father: Sultan Abdullah Al-Mu’tassim Billah Shah Ibni Al-Marhum Sultan Ahmad Al-Mu’azzam Shah
- Mother: Che Som binti Tun
- Religion: Sunni Islam

Sultan Abu Bakar Ri’ayatuddin Al-Mu’azzam Shah Ibni Al-Marhum Sultan Abdullah Al-Mu’tassim Billah Shah GCMG (Jawi: سلطان أبو بكر رعاية الدين المعظم شاه ابن المرحوم سلطان عبد الله المعتصم بالله شاه; 29 May 1904 – 5 May 1974) was the fourth modern sultan of Pahang.

== Life ==
Born on 29 May 1904 at Istana Hinggap, Pekan, he was the second son of Sultan Abdullah Al-Mu’tassim Billah Shah by his second wife, Som binti Tun.

Succeeding his father in 1932, he quickly became known as a friendly and approachable ruler by his subjects. During the Japanese occupation of Malaya, he discreetly encouraged resistance movements such as the Askar Wataniah, Force 136 and the Malayan Peoples' Anti-Japanese Army.

However, due to his penchant for marrying commoners, including several popular actresses and singers, he was less popular with other Malay rulers and they declined to choose him as Yang di-Pertuan Agong of Malaysia on five separate occasions.

== Family ==
He was married to Tengku Ampuan Pahang Raja Fatimah, the daughter of Sultan Iskandar of Perak, in Kuala Kangsar, Perak. It was a marriage between two royal relatives.

He died on 5 May 1974 at the Istana Peninjau, Kampung Padang Polo, Pekan at age 69 and was succeeded by his son Ahmad Shah.

== Honours ==
=== Honours of Pahang ===
- Founding Grand Master of the Family Order of the Crown of Indra of Pahang (25 May 1967)
- Founding Grand Master of the Order of the Crown of Pahang (27 December 1968)

=== Honours of Malaya ===
- Malaya
  - Recipient of the Order of the Crown of the Realm (DMN) (31 August 1958)

=== Honours of other State ===
- Johor
  - First Class of the Royal Family Order of Johor (DK I) (1965)
- Kedah
  - Member of the Royal Family Order of Kedah (DK) (1969)
- Perak
  - Member of the Royal Family Order of Perak (DK) (1970)

=== Foreign honours ===
- United Kingdom
  - Honorary Knight Grand Cross of the Order of St Michael and St George (GCMG) – Sir (1 June 1953)
- Brunei
  - Member of the Family Order of Seri Utama (DK) - Dato Seri Utama (1958)

Preceded by Sultan Abdullah Al-Mutassim Billah Shah	Sultan of Pahang; 1932-1974	Succeeded by Sultan Ahmad Shah
