= Che Puan Besar Kalsom Abdullah =

Sultanah of Pahang from 1992 to 2019

Kalsom كلثوم

Che Puan Besar of Pahang
- Tenure: 15 August 2019 – present
- Predecessor: Tengku Ampuan Besar Raja Fatimah (as Tengku Ampuan Besar)

Sultanah of Pahang
- Tenure: 30 September 1992 – 11 January 2019
- Predecessor: Tengku Ampuan Afzan (as Tengku Ampuan)
- Successor: Tengku Ampuan Azizah Aminah Maimunah Iskandariah (as Tengku Ampuan)
- Born: 12 September 1951 (age 74); Taftan, Baluchistan, Dominion of Pakistan
- Spouse: Sultan Haji Ahmad Shah Al-Musta’in Billah (m. 1991; died 2019)
- Issue: Tengku Fahad Mua'adzam Shah
- Religion: Sunni Islam

Che Puan Besar Hajjah Kalsom Abdullah (Jawi: چئ ڤوان بسر حاجه كلثوم عبدالله), formerly known as Sultanah Kalsom (née Anita; born 12 September 1951 in Taftan, Baluchistan, Dominion of Pakistan) is a former Sultanah of Pahang as the second wife of Sultan Haji Ahmad Shah. She is of Persian and Pakistani descent.

== Early life ==
She was born on 12 September 1951 in Taftan, Baluchistan, Dominion of Pakistan.

Prior to her marriage, she was an air stewardess for a prominent airline.

== Personal life ==
She and the Sultan have a son together Tengku Fahad Mua'adzam Shah, the Tengku Arif Temenggong of Pahang.

== Kiwanis Club of Kuantan ==
She has been the patron of the Kiwanis Club of Kuantan since 2004.

== Titles, styles, honours, and recognitions ==
Sultanah Kalsom's style was changed to Cik Puan Besar Hajjah Kalsom Abdullah on 15 August 2019, following the death of Sultan Haji Ahmad Shah in May 2019.

=== Honours of Pahang ===
- Member 1st class of the Family Order of the Crown of Indra of Pahang (DK I) (24 October 1999)

=== Honorary degrees ===
- Malaysia
  - Honorary Doctorate of Social Development from the Limkokwing University of Creative Technology - (18 December 2010)

Malaysian royalty
| Preceded by Tengku Ampuan Afzan | Sultanah of Pahang | Succeeded by Tengku Ampuan Azizah |
