= Tengku Fahad Mua'adzam Shah =

Malaysian prince

- Tengku Arif Temenggong
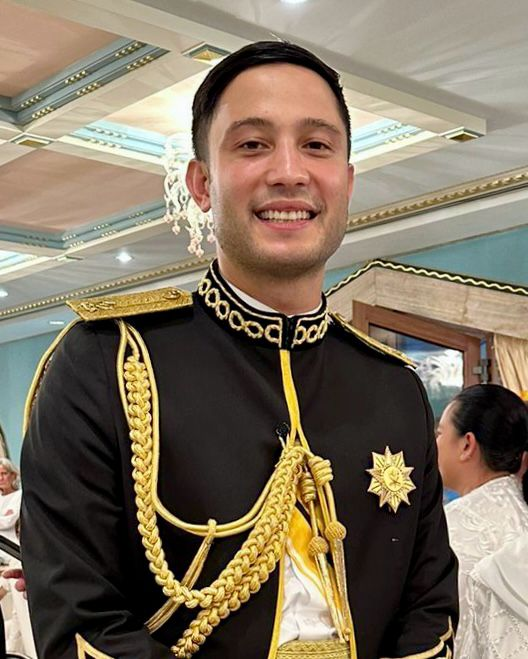
- Tengku Fahad in 2022
- Born: Tengku Fahad Mua'adzam Shah ibni Tengku Ahmad Shah; 10 February 1994 (age 32); Tengku Ampuan Afzan Hospital, Pahang, Malaysia
Names
- Tengku Fahad Mua'adzam Shah ibni Tengku Ahmad Shah
Regnal name
- Tengku Fahad Mua'adzam Shah ibni Almarhum Sultan Haji Ahmad Shah Al-Musta'in Billah
- House: Bendahara
- Father: Sultan Haji Ahmad Shah Al-Musta’in Billah
- Mother: Che Puan Besar Kalsom Abdullah
- Religion: Sunni Islam

Tengku Fahad Mua'adzam Shah ibni Almarhum Sultan Haji Ahmad Shah Al-Musta'in Billah (born 10 February 1994) is a member of the Pahang royal family who is the Tengku Arif Temenggong. He is the eighth and youngest child of the late Sultan of Pahang, Sultan Ahmad Shah Al-Musta'in Billah, and his only child with his second wife, the former Sultanah of Pahang, Che Puan Besar Kalsom Abdullah. Additionally, he is the President of Pahang Rangers F.C., founder of the Sultan Ahmad Shah Environment Trust, the chairman of TAT Alliance Services, and co-founder of SASET Foundation.

Media coverage of Tengku Fahad started at the proclamation of Al-Sultan Abdullah as the 6th Sultan of modern Pahang at the Abu Bakar Palace in January 2019. On 3 November 2019, he presided over the United Bentong Brilliant Network Association's Youth Carnival, which was organized by Dato' Jasvir Singh. He is usually present during charitable events.

== Personal life ==
Tengku Fahad Mua'adzam Shah, the only son of the late Sultan Ahmad Shah Al-Musta'in Billah by his second wife, Che Puan Besar Kalsom Abdullah, was born at the Tengku Ampuan Afzan Hospital in Kuantan, Pahang. Garden International School in Kuantan was the educational institution attended by him. Thereafter, he continued his education at Eton College in the United Kingdom. Additionally, he pursued his education and received a bachelor's degree from Princeton University in the United States.

During their 14-day visit of Malaysia, a football team from Eton College landed in Kuala Lumpur on 22 August 2011, to play a series of friendly matches with the national young team and the Pahang youth teams. Tengku Fahad was one of the 20 players that made up the Eton College squad.

== Titles and honours ==
Styles of Tengku Fahad Mua'adzam Shah
- Reference style: His Highness
- Spoken style: Your Highness
- Alternative style: Tengku

In addition to assuming the position of WSSEM Patron, Tengku Fahad was awarded the Royal Fellowship of the World Society of Sports and Exercise Medicine (WSSEM) in 2017. This recognition was given for his active participation in sports. He was conferred the title of Tengku Arif Temenggong in 2002 and was awarded the following honours;

- Member 2nd class of the Family Order of the Crown of Indra of Pahang (DK II) (24 October 2008)
- Grand Knight of the Order of Sri Setia Al-Sultan Abdullah Ahmad Shah of Pahang (SAAS) – Dato' Sri Setia (30 July 2024)
- Grand Knight of the Order of Sultan Ahmad Shah of Pahang (SSAP) – Dato' Sri (23 November 2023)
- Grand Knight of the Order of the Crown of Pahang (SIMP) – Dato' Indera (23 November 2023)
- Royal Fellowship of the World Society of Sports and Exercise Medicine (WSSEM; 2017)
