= Tengkolok =

Traditional Malay or Indonesian male headgear

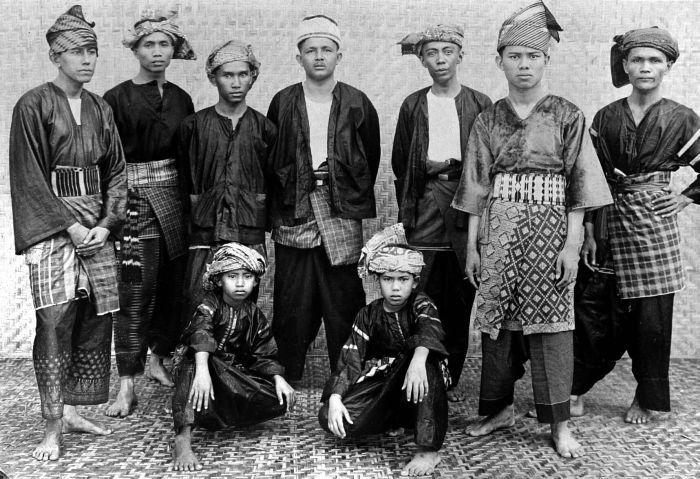
- Minangkabau man with a tengkolok headgear.
- Type: Traditional headgear
- Material: Songket
- Place of origin: Maritime Southeast Asia
- Manufacturer: Malay people Banjarese, Minangkabau, Buginese, Makassar, Minahasa, Bajau, Kadazandusun, Gorontalo, Moro people and Brunei Malay people

Tengkolok (Jawi: تڠكولوق), also known as Tanjak or Destar (Minangkabau: Deta; Kelantan-Pattani: Semutar; Brunei: Dastar) is a traditional Malay or Indonesian male headgear. It is made from long songket cloth folded and tied in a particular style (solek). Nowadays, it is usually worn in ceremonial functions, such as by royalty during royal ceremonies and by grooms at weddings.

== Name ==
The terms tengkolok, Tanjak, and setanjak are synonyms; the word "tengkolok" also refers to "headgear or headcover worn by women", but the definition of women's headgear is rarely used today.

However, some people say that tengkolok, tanjak, and destar are different in terms of cloth type or tying even though the purpose is the same, which the tengkolok is a headgear made from cloth of good quality and its tying has many layers and tapers to tip; destar has low tying and its tying layers are fewer than tengkolok; tanjak has tying much like tengkolok, the only difference is that its cloth is simple and thin.

== Style (Solek) ==
Tengkolok is made in various forms, with different types and designs of cloth, depending on the social status of its dress.

The general term for different styles of tengkolok is solek. Each solek has its special name. For instance: the tengkolok worn by Yang di-Pertuan Agong during the installation ceremony is known as Solek Dendam Tak Sudah (Persistent Vengeance Style).

Every Malay kings has their particular solek:

- Raja of Perlis, Sultan of Kedah and Yang di-Pertuan Besar of Negeri Sembilan: Solek Dendam Tak Sudah (Persistent Vengeance Style)
- Sultan of Perak: Solek Ayam Patah Kepak (Broken Winged Chicken Style)
- Sultan of Selangor: Solek Balung Raja (Royal Crest Style)
- Sultan of Pahang: Solek Sekelongsong Bunga
- Sultan of Terengganu: Solek Belalai Gajah
- Sultan of Kelantan: Solek Ketam Budu

Unlike other Malay kings, the Sultan of Johor does not wear a tengkolok, but instead wear a crown (Mahkota Diraja Johor) due to influence from the British Empire.

== Brunei ==
The traditional attire of the Brunei Malay population, locally known as destar, represents the significance of Malay rulers and nobility throughout history. In addition, it served as a representation of the social structure of the time, separating commoners from dignitaries until the head covering became the Malay custom of dressing. Over two millennia have passed since the discovery of Brunei's destar types, which include Destar Taruna, Helang Benari, Singa Menerpa, Layar Bahtera, Nakhoda Sailar, and Hulubalang Diraja. The destar's production process, it was previously known that a high-quality dastar requires a week to complete, which has a more adaptable notion, is what makes it distinctive.

== Gallery ==
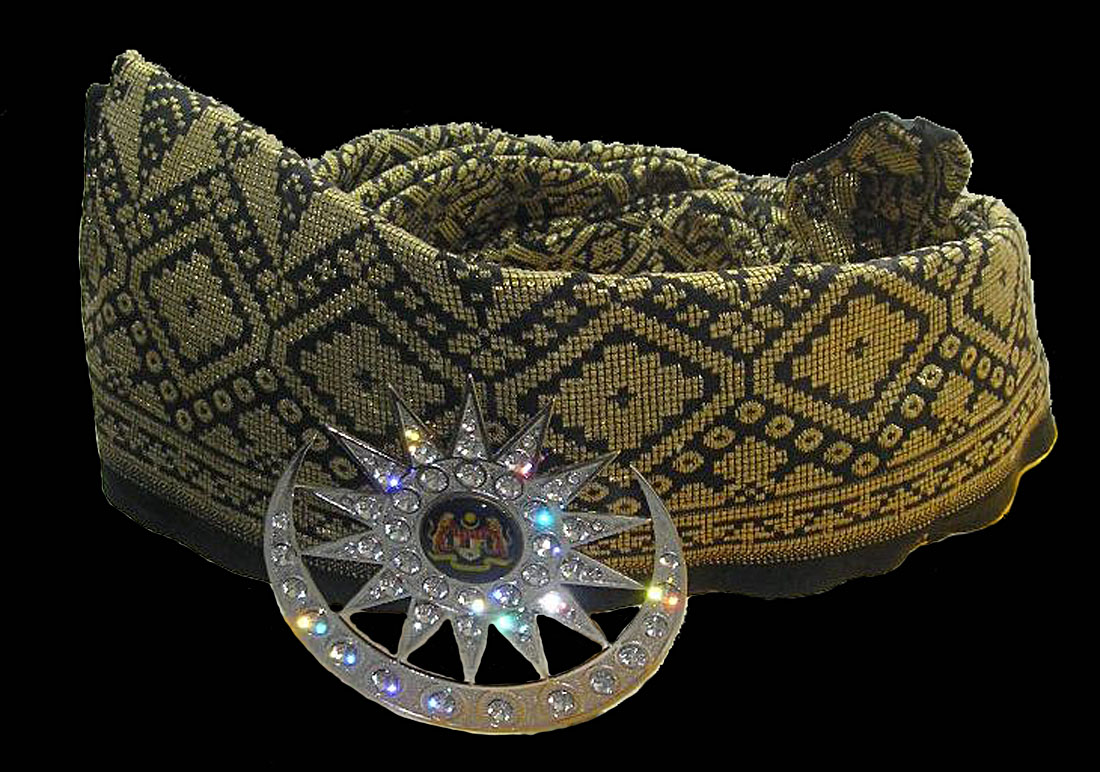
"Dendam Tak Sudah" tengkolok wore by Yang di-Pertuan Agong during coronation ceremony

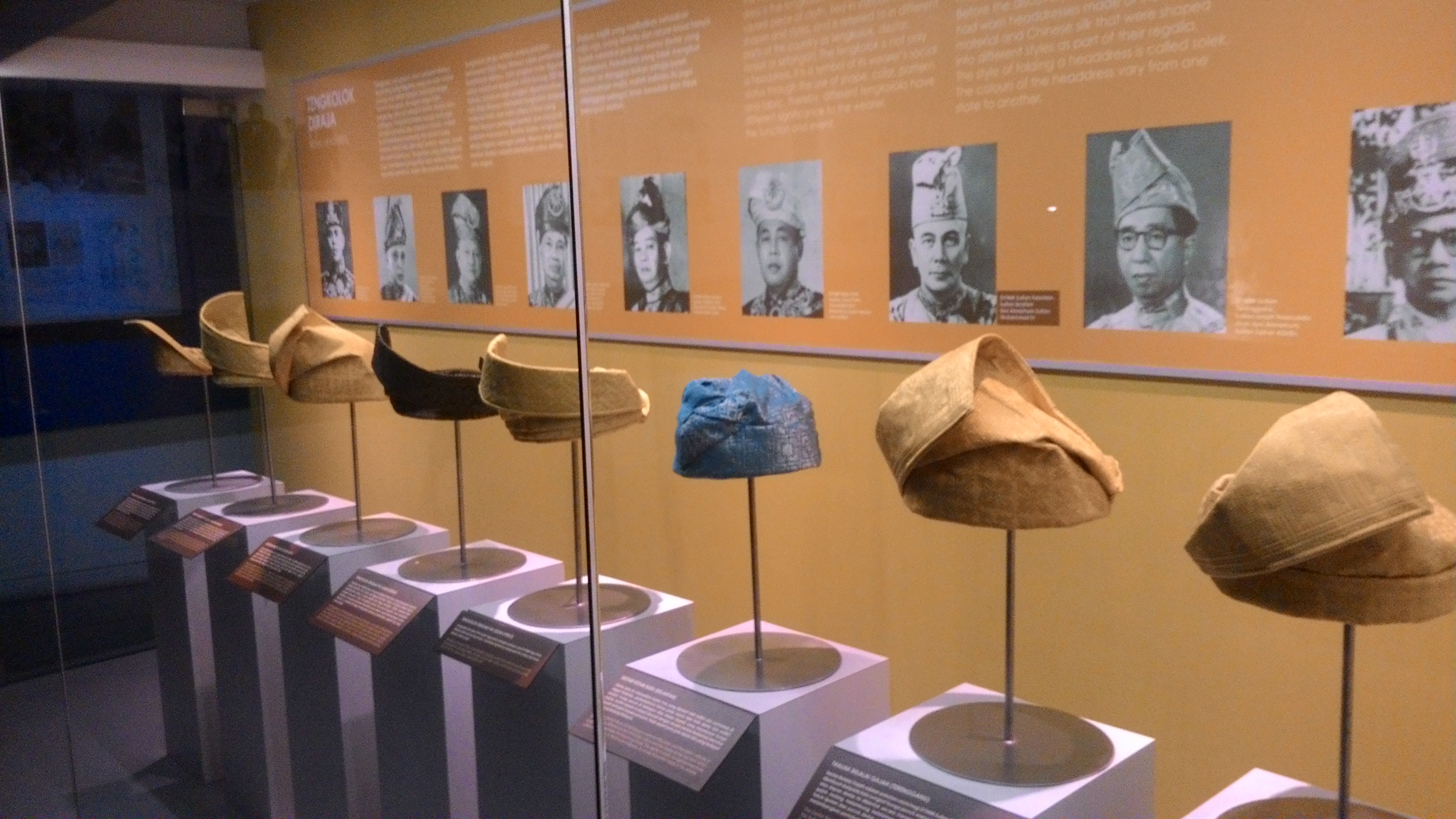
Collection of Tengkolok worn by Sultan for all Malay states except Johor which Sultan of Johor wore a crown due to influence from the British Empire. Each tengkolok has different styles as there has to contain symbols and meanings.

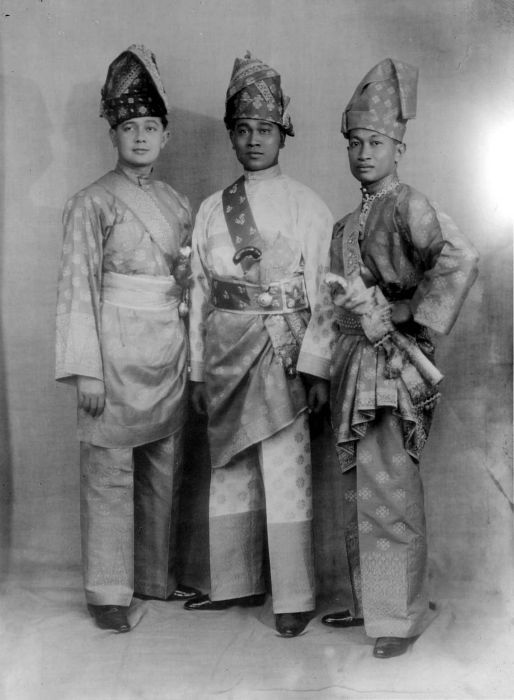
A Sumatran variant type of tengkolok worn by royal princes from Deli, Langkat and Serdang Kingdom of North Sumatra, Indonesia

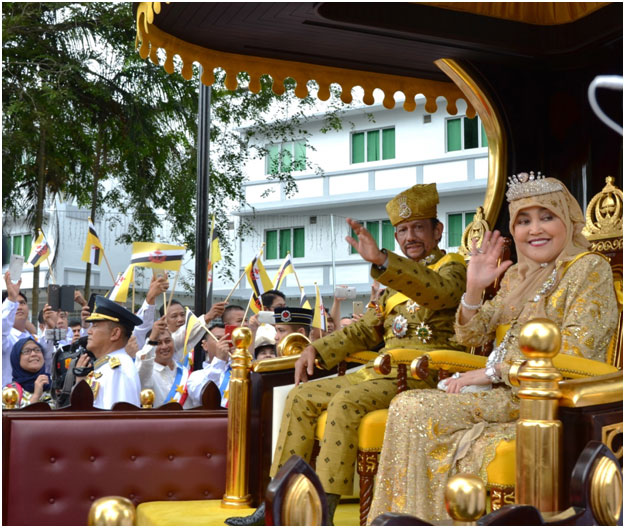
Tengkolok being worn by Sultan Hassanal Bolkiah

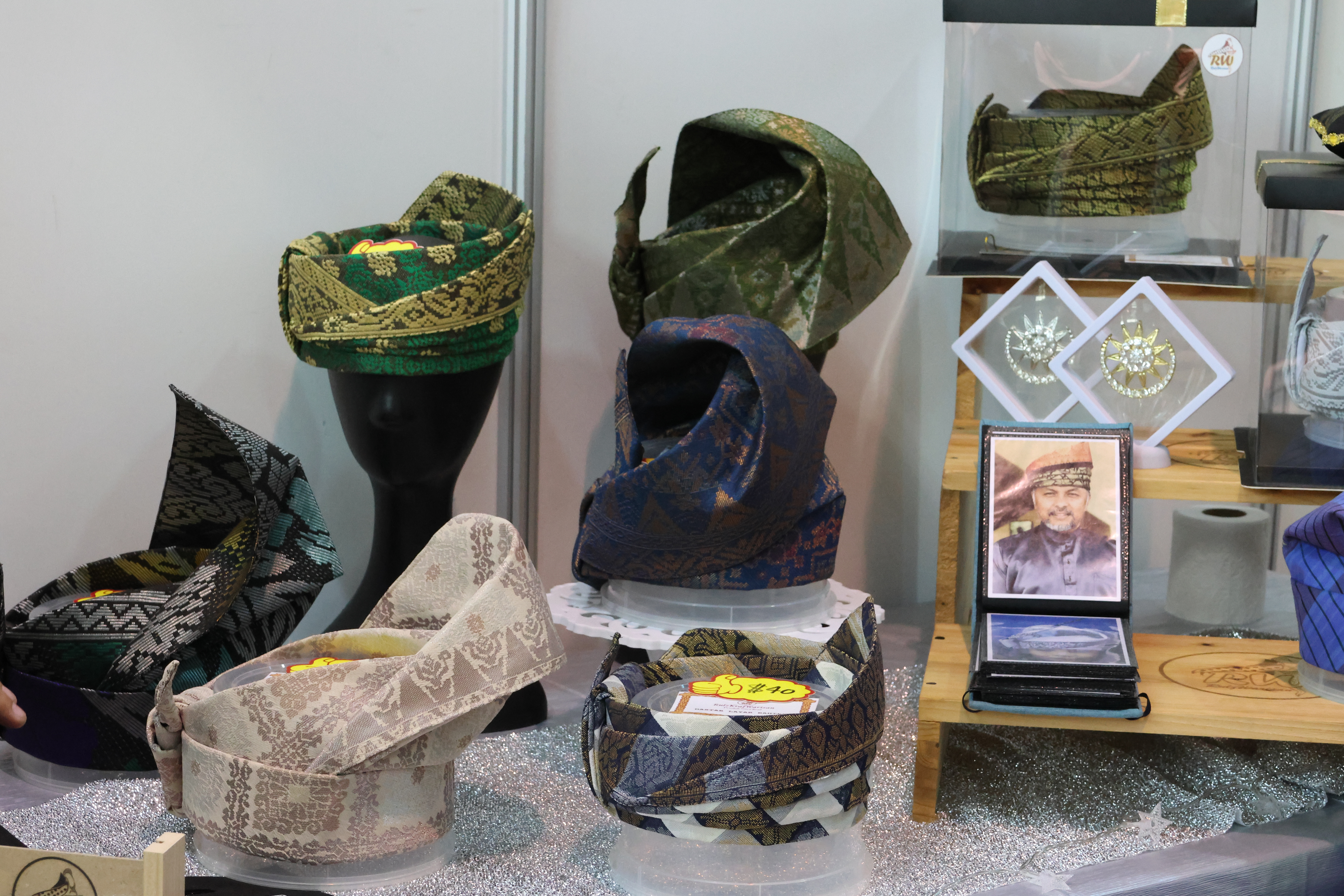
Different types of Brunei tengolok on display

== See also ==
- List of hat styles
- Blangkon
- Khăn vấn
- Songkok
- Malaysian cultural outfits
- Culture of Malaysia
- National costume of Indonesia
- Culture of Indonesia
