= Pekan Royal Mausoleum =

Burial grounds in Pahang, Malaysia

Coordinates: 3.526352°N 103.449533°E

Pahang Old Royal Mausoleum is a Pahang royal burial grounds at Kampung Marhum, Kuala Pahang, Pekan, Pahang, Malaysia.

== Rulers, with the title Bendahara Seri Maharaja ==
List of graves

- Tun Abdul Majid II (1756–1802)
- Tun Muhammad (1802–1803)
- Tun Koris II (1803–1806)
- Tun Ali (1806–1857)

== Sultan ==
- Sultan Ahmad al-Mu’azzam Shah (1881–1914) ((Tun Ahmad) (1863–1881))
- Sultan Mahmud Shah (1914–1917)
- Sultan Abdullah al-Mu’tassim Billah Shah I (1917–1932)

Sultan of Johor

- Sultan Abdul Jalil Riayat Shah IV (1699-1720)

== Queen Consort/Consort ==
- Tengku Hajjah Kalsum binti Tun ‘Abdullah Tengku Ampuan Besar (died 27th August 1967)
- Cik Wan Chantik binti Wan Muhammad Amin (died 30 March 1944)

== Pahang Royal Family ==
- 1.Tengku Ali al-Mu’azzam Billah Shah I ibni Almarhum Sultan Ahmad al-Mu’azzam Shah I – (Tengku Muda) (died 1919)
- 2.Tengku Sulaiman ibni Almarhum Sultan Ahmad al-Mu’azzam Shah I – (Tengku Besar III) and (Menteri Besar of Pahang II) (died 1960).
  - 1.Tengku Abdul Jallil Shah ibni Almarhum Tengku Besar Sulaiman al-Mu’azzam Shah I - (Tengku Besar II) (died 1983).
  - 2.Tengku Ibrahim ibni Almarhum Tengku Besar Haji Sulaiman al-Mu’azzam Shah I - (Tengku Panglima Perang IV) (died 1983).
- 3.Tengku Jussoh Alias Yussof ibni Almarhum Sultan Ahmad al-Mu’azzam Shah I - (Tengku Panglima Perang I) (died 1939).
- 4.Tengku Abdul Rahman al-Mu'tassim Billah Shah ibni Almarhum Sultan Haji Sir Abdullah al-Mu'tassim Billah Shah I (died 1919).
- 5.Tengku Mahmudd al-Mu'rassim Billah Shah ibni Almarhum Sultan Abdullah al-Mu'tassim Billah Shah I – (Tengku Bendahara III) (died 1940).
- 6.Tengku Ismaill al-Mu'fassim Billah Shah ibni Almarhum Sultan bdullah al-Mu'tassim Billah Shah I – (Orang Kaya Semantan III) (died 1940).
- 7.Tengku Hussain al-Mu'tassim Billah Shah ibni Almarhum Sultan Abdullah al-Mu'tassim Billah Shah I - (died 1940).
- 8.Tengku Abdul Ghanie al-Mu'tassim Shah ibni Almarhum Sultan Abdullah al-Mu'tassim Billah Shah I – (Tengku Asair Diraja X) (died 1940).
- 9.Tengku Abdul Khalid ibni Almarhum Sultan Abdullah al-Mu'tassim Billah Shah I – (Tengku Panglima Besar XI) (died 1940).
- 10.Tengku Abdul Hamid Shah ibni Almarhum Sultan Abdullah al-Mu'tassim Billah Shah I - ( ) (died 1940).
- 11.Tengku Rokiah binti Almarhum Sultan Abdullah al-Mu'tassim Billah Shah I - (died 1940).
- 12.Tengku Wok Zaharah binti Almarhum Sultan Abdullah al-Mu'tassim Billah Shah I - (died 1940).
- 13.Tengku Long Hamidah binti Almarhum Abdullah al-Mu'tassim Billah Shah I - (died 1940).
- 14.Tengku Kechik Kamariah binti Almarhum Sultan Abdullah al-Mu'tassim Billah Shah I - (died 1940).
- 15.Tengku Aminah binti Almarhum Sultan Abdullah al-Mu'tassim Billah Shah I - (died 1940).
- 16.Tengku Aishah binti Almarhum Sultan Abdullah al-Mu'tassim Billah Shah I - (died 1940).
- 17.Tengku Maimun binti Almarhum Sultan Abdullah al-Mu'tassim Billah Shah I - (died 1940).

== See also ==
- Sultan Abdul Samad Mausoleum, Bukit Jugra, Jugra, Kuala Langat, Selangor
- Shah Alam Royal Mausoleum, Shah Alam, Selangor
- Kelantan Royal Mausoleum, Kota Bharu, Kelantan
- Pahang Old Royal Mausoleum, Kampung Marhum, Kuala Pahang, Pekan, Pahang
- Al-Ghufran Royal Mausoleum, Kuala Kangsar, Perak
- Mahmoodiah Royal Mausoleum, Johor Bahru, Johor
- Seri Menanti Royal Mausoleum, Seri Menanti, Kuala Pilah, Negeri Sembilan
