= Abdullah al-Muʽtassim Billah Shah of Pahang =

Sultan of Pahang (r. 1917–1932)

Abdullah Al-Muʽtassim Billah Shah عبد الله المعتصم بالله شاه
- Al Muʽtassim Billah (He who seek refuge in God)

Sultan of Pahang
- Reign: 19 June 1917 – 22 June 1932
- Installation: May 1919
- Predecessor: Sultan Mahmud Shah
- Successor: Sultan Abu Bakar Ri’ayatuddin Al-Mu’azzam Shah
- Born: 12 October 1874; Pekan, Pahang
- Died: 22 June 1932 (aged 57); Istana Kuning, Pekan, Pahang
- Burial: 23 June 1932; Royal Cemetery, Kampung Marhum, Kuala Pahang, Pahang
- Spouse: Che Endut; Sultanah Che Kalsum Binti Tun Abdullah; Che Wan Chantik Binti Wan Mohd Amin
- Issue: Tengku Abdul Rahman; Tengku Abu Bakar; Tengku Mahmud; Tengku Haji Abdul Aziz; Tengku Ahmad; Tengku Ismail; Tengku Haji Husain; Tengku Abdul Ghani; Tengku Dato Abdul Khalid; Tengku Dato Haji Abdul Hamid; Tengku Rokiah; Tengku Wok Zaharah; Tengku Long Hamidah; Tengku Kechik Kamariah; Tengku Hajjah Aminah; Tengku Aishah; Tengku Maimunah
Names
- Kebawah Duli Yang Maha Mulia Colonel Paduka Seri Sultan Abdullah Al-Mu’tassim Billah Shah Ibni Al-Marhum Sultan Ahmad Al-Mu’azzam Shah
- Father: Sultan Ahmad Al-Mu’azzam Shah Ibni Al-Marhum Bendahara Sri Maharaja Tun Ali
- Mother: Cik Kusuma Binti Tok Minal Daeng Koro
- Religion: Sunni Islam

Sultan ʽAbdullah Al-Muʽtassim Billah Shah Ibni Al-Marhum Sultan Ahmad Al-Muʽazzam Shah (Jawi: سلطان عبد الله المعتصم بالله شاه ابن المرحوم سلطان أحمد المعظم شاه; 12 October 1874 – 22 June 1932) was the third modern sultan of Pahang, reigning from 1917 to 1932.

== Early life ==
Born at the Royal Palace, Pekan Lama, on 12 October 1874, he was the third son of Sultan Ahmad Muʽazzam and Cik Kusuma Sokma binti Tok Minal Daeng Koro. He was a stepbrother of Mahmud Shah II who was the raja bendahara.

== Reign ==
During his reign, Pahang was immersed in several political developments. The British government introduced legislation to modernize the Malay states, creating the Federated Malay States in 1896 and establishing the Federal Council in 1909.

Bitter resentment was generated against the ineffectiveness of the rulers' participation in the Federal Council during Abdullah's reign. The Sultan was unhappy that Kuala Lumpur controlled a lot of power, even in affairs which he thought had nothing to do with the Federated Malay States, but only with Pahang. However, he reluctantly accepted the arrangement as he was dependent on the funds from the Federated Malay States, as Pahang stood to benefit from the wealth of Perak and Selangor.

The Sultan was somewhat appeased when during the governorship of Sir Laurence Guillemard there was intense activity to decentralise power away from Kuala Lumpur back to the individual states which comprised the Federated Malay States. However, neither he nor his successor would see this scheme materialize, as the Japanese invaded Malaya.

Among other reforms initiated during Abdullah's reign was the abolishment of a modified form of the corvée system commonly practised in Pahang. Beginning 1919, substantial Malay reservation areas were opened to ensure that land remained available to local Malays. The Sultanate Lands Enactment was promulgated in 1919, vesting certain areas in the sultan and giving him the right to regulate the leasing and occupation of those areas.

The title tengku mahkota ('crown prince'), along with other Malay titles, and the framing of agnatic rules of succession, was created in 1930. In 1932, at the age of 20, Tengku Abu Bakar, son and heir of Abdullah was installed as the Tengku Mahkota of Pahang, the first time a prince ever had this title conferred to them.

== Personal life ==
Abdullah first married a woman known as Che' Endut. His second wife was Sultanah Che Kalsum binti Tun Abdullah, daughter of the Terengganuan nobleman Tun Abdullah bin Tun Abdul Rauf, who later was made the Sultanah of Pahang (the first sultanah titleholders). His first son from this marriage was Abu Bakar, who later succeeded him as sultan. Abdullah's third marriage was with Cik Wan Chantik binti Wan Muhammad Amin, daughter of a Pattani nobleman Wan Muhammad Amin. He had a total of ten sons and seven daughters from his wives.

== Death and succession ==
By 1931, Abdullah's health had begun to fail, yet he still managed to attend the Durbar held in August that year. He died at the Istana Kuning, Pekan on 22 June 1932 and was buried at the Royal Cemetery, Kuala Pahang. He was succeeded by his second son, Tengku Mahkota Abu Bakar.

== Bibliography ==
- Ahmad Sarji Abdul Hamid (2011), The Encyclopedia of Malaysia, vol. 16 – The Rulers of Malaysia, Editions Didier Millet, ISBN 978-981-3018-54-9
- Khoo, Gilbert (1980), "From Pre-Malaccan period to present day", New Straits Times
