= Installation of the Yang di-Pertuan Agong =

Formal ceremony inaugurating the Malaysian head of state

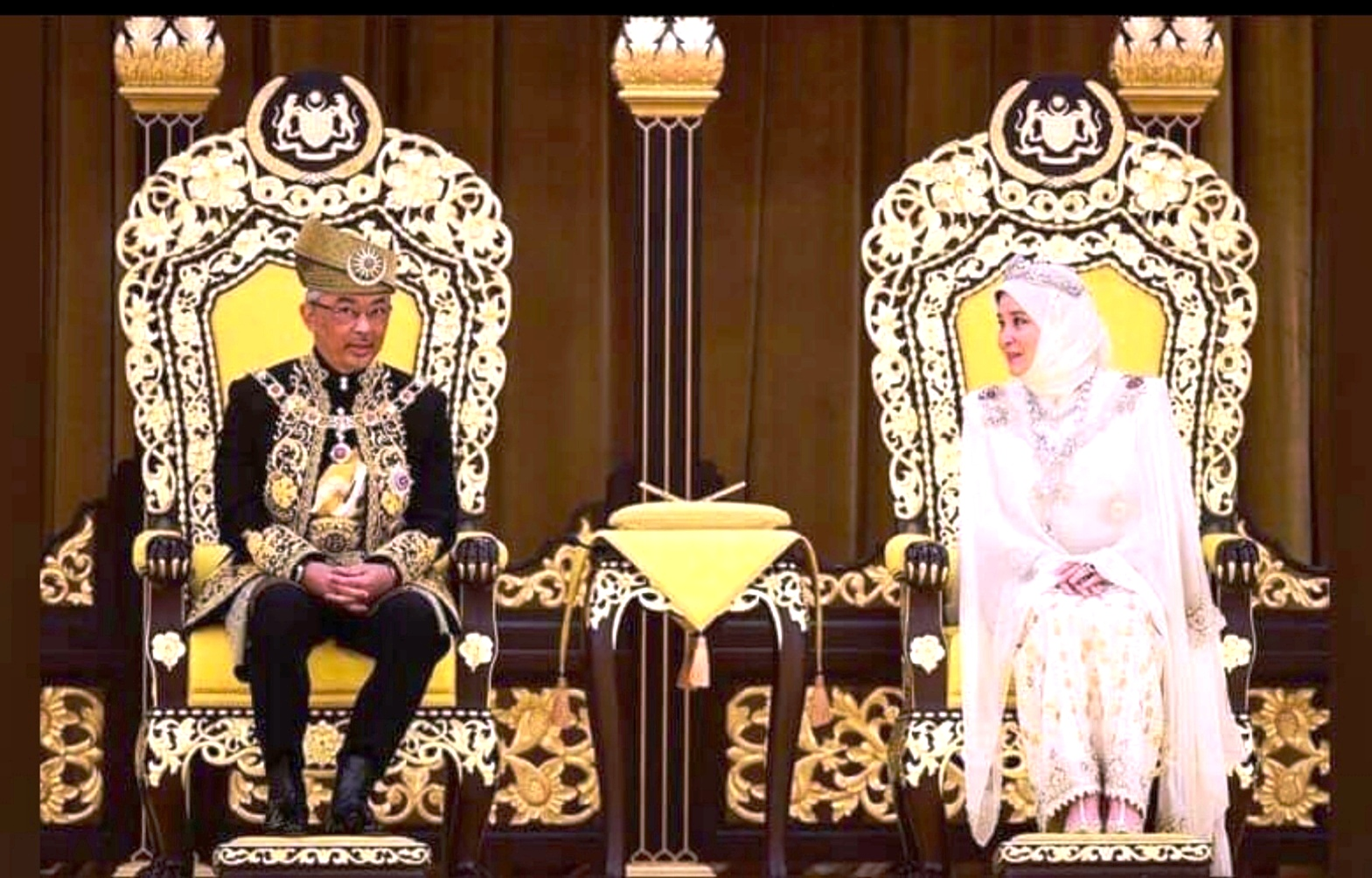
Abdullah of Pahang and Tunku Azizah, the Yang di-Pertuan Agong (King) and Raja Permaisuri Agong (Queen Consort) of Malaysia respectively, here photographed on July 30, 2019.

The installation of the Yang di-Pertuan Agong is a ceremony that formally marks the beginning of the reign of the Yang di-Pertuan Agong as the Malaysian head of state.

Since 1957, the rite has been a part of Malaysian history, with 13 such ceremonies held, first at the Tunku Abdul Rahman Hall at Jalan Ampang, Kuala Lumpur, and in the National Palace from 1980 onwards. The old National Palace at Jalan Istana hosted its final installation in 2007, and in 2012, the present National Palace at Jalan Tuanku Abdul Halim held its first installation.

The ceremony is a hybrid of ceremonies found in eight of nine royal states in Malaysia, which all have one similarity: all do not use a crown. Instead, a special headdress known as Tengkolok Diraja (Royal Headdress) is used, except in Johor and Selangor where the Sultan is crowned (as Johor sultanate is heavily British-influenced).

== Installation ==
The Installation of the Yang di-Pertuan Agong and his consort, the Raja Permaisuri Agong, is often held months after the Sovereign's election by the Conference of Rulers. The installation is strictly ceremonial as the Yang di-Pertuan Agong immediately takes office upon the expiry of the previous term, or in case of a vacancy, upon election. A simple inauguration ceremony is held on the day the Yang di-Pertuan Agong begins his term, in which the Sovereign takes the oath of office.

Since 2012, Istana Negara at Jalan Tuanku Abdul Halim, Kuala Lumpur, is the venue of the ceremonial enthronement, with Malaysian television networks providing a live nationwide simulcast of the proceedings. Before 2012, installations were held at the old Istana Negara at Jalan Istana, also in Kuala Lumpur.

The 24 April 2017 installation of the 15th Yang di-Pertuan Agong, Sultan Muhammad V of Kelantan, marked the first time that the Yang di-Pertuan Agong was installed without a consort or Raja Permaisuri Agong, as he was divorced from his wife years before.

== Service ==
=== Royal procession ===
A royal procession by members of the Royal Malaysia Police and the Royal Armoured Corps Motorised Escort Squadron makes its way through Kuala Lumpur's streets on the way to the National Palace at Jalan Tuanku Abdul Halim. On the way, Malaysians from all walks of life line the procession route to pay homage to the Sovereigns and shout "Daulat Tuanku!" (Long live the King!) at the procession as it passes by.

The ceremony begins with the arrival of the soon-to-be enthroned King in the National Palace. As they arrive at the entrance, the Prime Minister of Malaysia, his deputy, Cabinet ministers, officers of the Armed Forces and other dignitaries welcome them. The 1st Battalion of Royal Malay Regiment, together with the Central Band of the Regiment, are ready to give the arrival honours.

=== Arrival honours ===
As soon as the King and Queen both arrive, the Guard of Honour company gives the Royal Salute, the National Anthem is played, the King's and Regimental Colours are dipped in their presence. The Royal Artillery Regiment gives a 21-gun salute in their honour, the first of two such salutes.

After this, the company commander, usually a Major, asks the King at this point to inspect the Guard of Honour. While this is done, Menjunjung Duli is then played, he inspects the Guard of Honour and its Colours Party, together with his Aides-de-camp, the company commander and Umbrella Holder, and salutes the latter.

As it ends he reports to the King that the honours are completed, and leads the second Royal Salute for the unit as the national anthem is played again. They then enter the National Palace with one more salute from the Royal Armoured Corps lancers, and proceed to another room to meet up with all the rulers and their consorts, as well as the State Governors and their spouses.

=== Before the ceremony ===
The Royal Lancer Platoon of the Malaysian Royal Armoured Corps Mounted Ceremonial Squadron by then form up at the Throne Room entrance. Later on, Datuk Paduka Maharaja Lela (Grand Chamberlain) together with Warrior Mace Bearers, the King's Aides-de-camp and Royal Regalia Warrior Bearers get ready for the arrival of the King and Queen. The Dang Perwara (ladies-in-waiting) also await the arrival.

At the Throne Room, the state rulers, governors and regents, together with the federal and state government officials, ambassadors and high commissioners, Members of Parliament and Senators, military, police, fire and other uniformed service officers and enlisted personnel invited in their No.1 uniforms, medal and order recipients, diplomats and other guests in attendance all take their places. The Nobat (royal orchestra) members also prepare to play the installation music for the enthronement.

=== Opening of the ceremony ===
At the signal and announcement of the Master of Ceremonies and preceded by a fanfare by Royal Armoured Corps's trumpeters, The King and Queen Consort arrive at the Throne Room with music from the Nobat. They lead the Royal Procession followed by the Royal Regalia, Mace, Sword and Spear Holders, the Grand Chamberlain and the King's Aides-de-camp, and all go to their respective places, the King and consort in the Royal Throne and the Royal Regalia and Mace Holders at the left and right of the throne area, and the Aides-de-camp (drawn from the Malaysian Armed Forces and the Royal Malaysian Police) at the sides of it.

After their arrival, the Grand Chamberlain asks His Majesty to formally consent to the commencement of the ceremony, and the latter approves it, leading the former to formally open the ceremony.

=== Presentation of the Quran ===
After the commencement, the Grand Chamberlain then asks the King's consent to bring the ceremonial regalia for the installation. After granting the approval, he then walks off the hall, and then leads a second group of bearers entering the hall led by the Ceremonial Chief (Datuk Penghulu Istiadat), with the Nobat playing Menjunjung Duli at the background and carrying the Quran, Government Keris, Proclamation of Installation and Oath of Installation in golden-robed trays.

The second group later takes their places, and the Grand Chamberlain, after being given permission by the King, hands the Quran to him, who then kisses it and later places it in a table between the thrones of the King and his Queen Consort. This symbolises the King's duties and responsibilities as the Head of Islam. The other items are then placed on a separate table, and the bearers exit.

=== Proclamation of installation by the Prime Minister ===
The Prime Minister then formally proclaims the full enthronement of the King with these words:

In the name of God, Most Gracious, and Most Merciful:
this is to proclaim to all the people of Malaysia that His Royal Highness N. has been duly elected by Their Royal Highnesses the Rulers of Malaysia, having been met as the Conference of Rulers, and today, on this auspicious and glorious day and time, shall be installed as the duly enthroned ruler of the Malaysian Nation with the title, dignity and honor of His Majesty the (numbering) King of the Federation of Malaysia.

The Instrument of Proclamation used is first given to him by the Ceremonial Chief after the Grand Chamberlain has been given the King's consent, and after reading it he gives it back to the former.

=== Presentation of the Government Keris ===
After the proclamation, the Grand Chamberlain, upon the King's consent and after receiving it from the Ceremonial Chief, formally present to him the Government Keris, also known as the Keris Panjang Diraja (Royal Long Keris), as the symbol of his royal authority, and afterwards the Grand Chamberlain and the ceremonial chief descend the throne area. He then draws the sabre, kisses it, and returns it to its scabbard. Afterwards, he then puts the sabre on a pillow in the table near the Quran.

The golden Long Keris also recalls the pictorial traditions of the sultan as chief warrior of his kingdom in keeping with the history of the sultanates of Peninsular Malaysia, and also thus represents the King's constitutional mandate as Commander-in-Chief of the Armed Forces.

=== Oath of Installation and acclamation ===
After the sabre kissing, the King reads aloud his Oath of Installation. The audience then stands in respect.

In the Name of God, Most Gracious and Most Merciful:
We, N., as King of Malaysia, are truly grateful to God the Almighty, the Blessed, because of this election to the honourable office of King that has been happened because of His Benevolent Grace. Therefore, we shall justly and faithfully perform our duties in the administration of the nation of Malaysia, in accordance to its laws and its sacred constitution, shall protect the Islamic religion at all times as mandated, and shall duly fulfil the rules of law and order and promote good governance in our country.

After the King reads the installation oath and then returns it to the Grand Chamberlain and later to the Ceremonial Chief, and the music is then halted by the conductor of Nobat upon the return of the Oath booklet to the gold tray where it was placed beforehand, at this point in the ceremony he then leads the crowd in the threefold acclamation of Daulat Tuanku! (Long Live the King!), in which they respond with the same words.

It is then followed with the playing of the National Anthem by a selected military band from either of the three services of the Malaysian Armed Forces that is accompanied by the Royal Artillery Regiment's 21-gun Royal Salute in honour of the newly enthroned Sovereign. By then, the crowd remains standing up in respect of the National Anthem being played by the band.

When the music ends, the Installation Oath is returned by the Ceremonial Chief to the table, and everyone returns to their seats.

=== Congratulatory address by the Prime Minister ===
After the playing of the National Anthem and everyone goes back into their seats, the King is then asked by the Grand Chamberlain to consent to the Prime Minister's congratulatory speech, and he approves it. The speech is then read by the Prime Minister, with the paper, earlier received by the Ceremonial Chief, being returned to him in the end of it. The speech also contains a promise of unreserved allegiance to the King and consort on behalf of all Malaysians.

=== Speech from the throne ===
After the Prime Minister's address, the King, upon his consent to the Grand Chamberlain, gives his first Speech from the throne to the nation in the Throne Room, outlining the prospects of his tenure as the head of state of Malaysia. The paper of the speech is given to him by the Grand Chamberlain and the Ceremonial Chief before the speech commences, and when it is finished is given back to the latter two.

=== Thanksgiving prayer ===
After the speech, the Grand Chamberlain pays homage to the newly installed Sovereign. The Pegawai Agama Istana Negara (National Palace Islamic Religious Affairs Officer), also after paying his respects, then approaches the Yang di-Pertuan Agong to ask His Majesty's consent for an Islamic thanksgiving prayer. After receiving his approval, The religious officer recites the thanksgiving prayer in commemoration of the ceremony. After this, the Quran is removed from its place in the throne and is then handed back to the Grand Chamberlain and later on to the Ceremonial Chief.

=== Closing of the ceremony ===
At this point, the ceremony is finished when the Grand Chamberlain's permission to the newly installed Yang di-Pertuan Agong to declare the closing of the ceremony is granted by him. Afterwards, a Royal Procession happens to mark the departure of the Yang di-Pertuan Agong and his consort, led by them, the Grand Chamberlain, the Ladies-in-Waiting and the Royal Regalia holders. Everyone stands in respect when the procession passes by the centre of the Throne Room and when the music halts, the Yang and consort leave and then arrive in a designated room to await the dispersal of other dignitaries present.

== See also ==
- Coronation
- Yang di-Pertuan Agong
- Istana Negara
