= Family Order of the Crown of Indra of Pahang =

Honorific order of the Sultanate of Pahang

Family Order of the Crown of Indra of Pahang Darjah Kerabat Sri Indera Mahkota Pahang

Awarded by the Sultan of Pahang
- Type: Order
- Founded: 25 May 1967
- Royal house: House of Bendahara
- Status: Currently constituted
- Sovereign: Al-Sultan Abdullah Ri'ayatuddin Al-Mustafa Billah Shah
- Grades: 1st class (DK I); 2nd class (DK II)

Precedence
- Next (higher): Royal Family Order of Pahang
- Next (lower): Order of Al-Sultan Abdullah of Pahang
- Member 1st class Member 2nd class Ribbon bar of the order

The Most Esteemed Family Order of the Crown of Indra of Pahang (Malay: Darjah Kerabat Sri Indera Mahkota Pahang Yang Amat Dihormati) is an honorific order of the Sultanate of Pahang.

== History ==
Instituted on 25 May 1967, the order is awarded to the Pahang royal family members and members of other royal families in Malaysia. It is also awarded to notable individuals who have excellent contributions to the State, approved by the Sultan of Pahang.

== Classes ==
It is awarded in two classes:

- Member 1st class (Darjah Kerabat Sri Indera Mahkota Pahang Yang Amat Dihormati Kelas I, post-nominal letters : DK I)
- Member 2nd class (Darjah Kerabat Sri Indera Mahkota Pahang Yang Amat Dihormati Kelas II, post-nominal letters : DK II)

== Notable recipients ==
- Al-Sultan Abdullah Ri'ayatuddin Al-Mustafa Billah Shah (DK I)
- Tunku Azizah Aminah Maimunah Iskandariah (DK I)
- Abdul Razak Hussein (DK I, 1973)
- Sultan Hassanal Bolkiah (DK I, 1984)
- Che Puan Besar Kalsom Abdullah (DK I, 1999)
- Tuanku Syed Sirajuddin (DK I, 2005)
- Tuanku Tengku Fauziah (DK I, 2005)
- Abdullah Ahmad Badawi (DK II, 2006)
- Tengku Fahad Mua'adzam Shah (DK II, 2008)
- Najib Razak (DK II, 2010)
- Tengku Hassanal Ibrahim Alam Shah (DK I, 2019)
- Sultan Nazrin Muizzuddin Shah (DK I, 2019)
- Sultan Sharafuddin Idris Shah (DK I, 2021)
- Sultan Ibrahim (DK I, 2023) (DK II, 1997)
- Sultan Muhammad V (DK I, 2023)
- Prince Ali bin Hussein (DK II, 2024)

== See also ==
- Orders, decorations, and medals of the Malaysian states and federal territories#Pahang
- Orders, decorations, and medals of Pahang
- List of post-nominal letters (Pahang)
