= Kuala Pahang =

Coordinates: 3°32′N 103°28′E

Kuala Pahang is a town ward and mukim in Pekan District, Pahang, Malaysia.

== Geography ==
Kuala Pahang means Lower Pahang or "the estuary of the Pahang River"; this is where the Pahang River empties into the South China Sea.

== Attractions ==
The Pahang Old Royal Mausoleum is located at Kampung Marhum.

Royal Cemetery, Kuala Pahang, Mukim Sri Pekan, Pekan, Pahang
