= Tengku Muhammad Iskandar Ri'ayatuddin Shah =

Tengku Arif Bendahara

Tengku Muhammad Iskandar Ri'ayatuddin Shah تڠكو محمد إسكندر رعاية الدين شاه

Tengku Arif Bendahara
- Tenure: 15 August 2019 – present
- Proclamation: 15 August 2019
- Predecessors: Tengku Abdullah ibni Almarhum Sultan Abu Bakar
- Born: Tengku Muhammad Iskandar Ri'ayatuddin Shah bin Tengku Abdullah; 3 August 1997 (age 29); Tengku Ampuan Afzan Hospital, Kuantan, Pahang, Malaysia
- Spouse: Tengku Puan Bendahara Tengku Natasya Puteri binti Tengku Adnan (m. 2024)
- Issue: Tengku Nadine Amina Zahra
Names
- Tengku Muhammad Iskandar Ri'ayatuddin Shah ibni Al-Sultan Abdullah Ri'ayatuddin Al-Mustafa Billah Shah
- House: Bendahara
- Father: Al-Sultan Abdullah Ri'ayatuddin Al-Mustafa Billah Shah
- Mother: Tunku Azizah Aminah Maimunah Iskandariah
- Religion: Sunni Islam
- Signature: Sports career
- Country: Brunei
- Sport: Polo
Medal record
Polo
Representing Malaysia
SEA Games
Bronze medal – third place	2025 Bangkok	Mixed 2-4 Goals
Gold medal – first place	2025 Bangkok	Mixed 4-6 Goals
- Military career
- Allegiance: Malaysia
- Branch: Malaysian Army
- Rank: Lieutenant
- Unit: 505th Territorial Army Regiment

Tengku Muhammad Iskandar Ri'ayatuddin Shah ibni Al-Sultan Abdullah Ri'ayatuddin Al-Mustafa Billah Shah (Jawi: تڠكو محمد إسكندر رعاية الدين شاه أبن السلطان عبدﷲ رعاية الدين المصطفى بالله شاه; born 3 August 1997) is a member of the Pahang royal family who is the Tengku Arif Bendahara. He is the second son of the current Sultan of Pahang, Abdullah and his consort Tunku Azizah Aminah Maimunah Iskandariah, the Tengku Ampuan of Pahang.

As his father is the current Sultan of Pahang, Tengku Muhammad occupies the second position in the line of succession to the Pahang throne after his brother, Tengku Hassanal Ibrahim Alam Shah. He is also the Head of the Pahang State Customs Council and Representative of the Royal Family.

== Education ==
Tengku Muhammad attended the Caldicott Preparatory School in Buckinghamshire, from 2007 to 2010, and continued his A Levels in Harrow School in London. He pursued his degree in International Business Management at Oxford Brookes University, from 2015 to 2018, and graduated with a Bachelor of Arts in International Studies from University of Buckingham, in 2020.

== Positions and roles ==
On 15 August 2019, Tengku Muhammad was conferred the title Tengku Arif Bendahara by his father, Abdullah of Pahang.

In April 2024, Tengku Muhammad was appointed Chairman of Shahzan Alam Muda Sdn. Bhd., a subsidiary in which EDOTCO Malaysia holds an 80% stake, serving as the sole One Stop Agency (O.S.A.) for telecommunications infrastructure facilitation in Pahang.

On 9 June 2025, he joined the board of Citaglobal Bhd as an independent non-executive director, contributing to corporate governance in a firm focused on construction and property development sectors.

== Personal life ==
Tengku Muhammad married Tengku Natasya Puteri, the daughter of Tengku Adnan Tengku Mansor on 24 October 2024 at Balai Mahkota Istana Abdulaziz, Kuantan, Pahang.

Tengku Natasya Puteri gave birth to their first child and eldest daughter Tengku Nadine Amina Zahra on 2 July 2026.

== Sports career ==
Tengku Muhammad is passionate about sports such as football, polo, and golf. He has represented his country in equestrian polo at the 2025 SEA Games.

== Honours ==
=== Honours of Pahang ===
- Knight Grand Companion of the Order of Al-Sultan Abdullah of Pahang (SAAS) – Dato' Sri Setia (2024)
- Grand Knight of the Order of Sultan Ahmad Shah of Pahang (SSAP) – Dato' Sri (2020)
- Recipient of the Sultan Ahmad Shah Silver Jubilee Medal (1999)

=== Honours of Malaysia ===
- Malaysia
  - Recipient of the General Service Medal (PPA)
  - Recipient of the 16th Yang di-Pertuan Agong Installation Medal

=== Foreign honours ===
- Monaco
  - Grand Officer of the Order of Saint-Charles (27 November 2023)

Tengku Muhammad Iskandar Ri'ayatuddin Shah House of Bendahara, Pahang Born: 3 August 1997
Malaysian royalty
Lines of succession
Preceded by Tengku Hassanal Ibrahim Alam Shah	Line of succession to the throne of Pahang; 2nd in line	Followed by Tengku Ahmad Ismail Mu'adzam Shah
Regnal titles
Preceded by Tengku Abdullah	Tengku Arif Bendahara of Pahang; 2019–present	Incumbent
