= Josephine Ruby Trevorrow =

Former Wife of Sultan Iskandar of Johor, Malaysia (1935–2018)

Khalsom كلثوم
- Enche' Besar
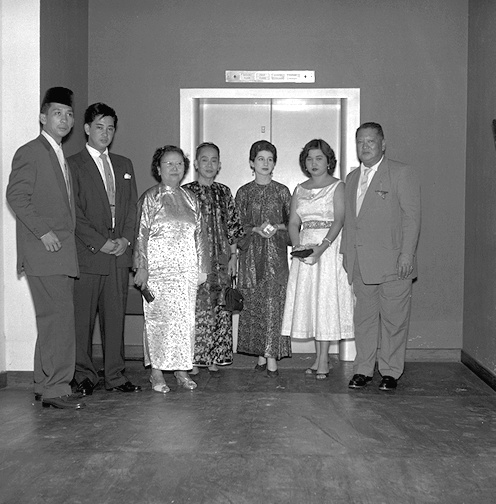
- Johor royal family in 1956, with Josephine Trevorrow third from right

Consort of the Crown Prince of Johor
- Tenure: 8 May 1959 - 9 June 1962
- Predecessor: Ungku Aminah
- Successor: Tengku Zanariah
- Born: Josephine Ruby Trevorrow; 2 December 1935; Cornwall, England
- Died: 1 June 2018 (aged 82); London, England
- Burial: 6 June 2018; Mahmoodiah Royal Mausoleum
- Spouse: Tunku Mahmood Iskandar (m. 1956; div. 1962)
- Issue: Tunku Kamariah Aminah Maimunah Iskandariah; Tunku Zabedah Aminah Maimunah Iskandariah; Tunku Ibrahim Ismail; Tunku Azizah Aminah Maimunah Iskandariah
Regnal name
- Enche' Besar Hajah Khalsom binti Abdullah
- House: Temenggong (by marriage)

Almarhumah Enche' Besar Hajah Khalsom binti Abdullah (Jawi: انچئ بسر حاجه كلثوم بنت عبد الله; born Josephine Ruby Trevorrow; 2 December 1935 – 1 June 2018) was the first wife of Sultan Iskandar and mother of Sultan Ibrahim, who is the current Sultan of Johor and the seventeenth King of Malaysia. One of her daughters, Tunku Azizah, married Sultan Abdullah, the current Sultan of Pahang and the sixteenth King of Malaysia.

She was born on 2 December 1935 in Cornwall in England, the only daughter of Reginald George Trevorrow, a textile manufacturer from Torquay, Cornwall, and his wife Ruby May Alderman. She met Iskandar while he was studying in England. After that she converted to Islam and changed her name to Khalsom binti Abdullah; they married on 5 January 1956. On 8 May 1959, after her husband was proclaimed Tunku Mahkota (Crown Prince) of Johor, she was known as Yang Amat Mulia Che’ Puan Khalsom Abdullah. The couple was married for six and a half years and had four children:

- Tunku Puteri Kamariah Aminah Maimunah Iskandariah (b. 11 July 1956)
- Tunku Besar Zabedah Aminah Maimunah Iskandariah (b. 20 October 1957)
- Sultan Ibrahim (b. 22 November 1958), the fifth Sultan of modern Johor and the seventeenth Yang di-Pertuan Agong (King of Malaysia)
- Tunku Hajah Azizah Aminah Maimunah Iskandariah (b. 5 August 1960), the fifth Tengku Ampuan of Pahang and the sixteenth Raja Permaisuri Agong (Queen consort of Malaysia)

On 9 June 1962 they divorced, shortly after Iskandar's second marriage to Tengku Zanariah, and she returned to England.

Later in 2010, her son Ibrahim, who had just become the Sultan of Johor, bestowed upon her the honorific form of address as Yang Amat Mulia Enche' Besar Hajah Khalsom Abdullah, D.K., S.M.I.J. She died aged 82 on 1 June 2018 at King Edward VII's Hospital in London and was buried on 6 June in the Mahmoodiah Royal Mausoleum in Johor Bahru.

== Honours ==
- First Class of the Royal Family Order of Johor (DK I) (22 November 2010)
- Grand Knight of the Order of Sultan Ibrahim of Johor (SMIJ) (30 March 2015) – Datin Paduka

== See also ==
- Princess Muna Al Hussein, another British-born consort to a Muslim monarch
