= Installation of Yang di-Pertuan Agong XVI =

Installation of Malaysia's sovereign

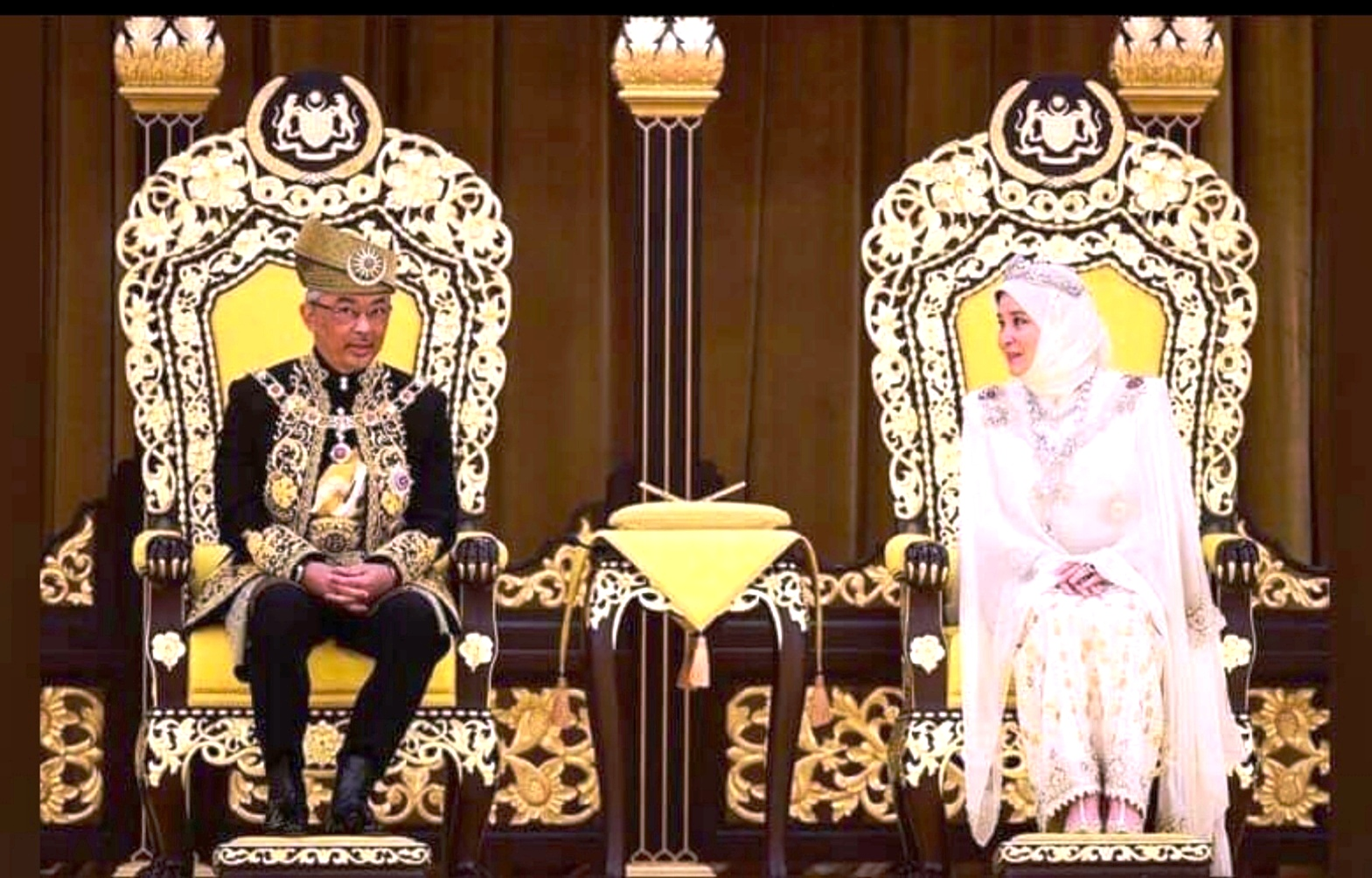
- Native name: Istiadat Pertabalan Kebawah Duli Yang Maha Mulia Seri Paduka Baginda Yang di-Pertuan Agong XVI Al-Sultan Abdullah Ri'ayatuddin Al-Mustafa Billah Shah ibni Almarhum Sultan Haji Ahmad Shah Al-Musta'in Billah
- English name: Installation Ceremony of His Majesty Seri Paduka Baginda The Yang di-Pertuan Agong XVI Al-Sultan Abdullah Ri'ayatuddin Al-Mustafa Billah Shah ibni Almarhum Sultan Haji Ahmad Shah Al-Musta'in Billah
- Date: 30 July 2019
- Location: Istana Negara, Jalan Tuanku Abdul Halim, Kuala Lumpur; 3°09′41″N 101°39′49″E
- Participants: Al-Sultan Abdullah Ri'ayatuddin Al-Mustafa Billah Shah; Tunku Azizah Aminah Maimunah Iskandariah; Datuk Azuan Affendy Zairakithnaini, the Grand Chamberlain; Tun Dr. Mahathir Mohamad, the Prime Minister; Datuk Abd Aziz Che Yacob, Istana Negara Islamic Affairs officer; Selected officers of Istana Negara

The installation of Al-Sultan Abdullah Ri'ayatuddin Al-Mustafa Billah Shah ibni Almarhum Sultan Haji Ahmad Shah Al-Musta'in Billah as the sixteenth Yang di-Pertuan Agong of Malaysia took place in a Malay Royal Ceremony at the Balairong Seri, Istana Negara, Kuala Lumpur on Tuesday, 30 July 2019 at 10 a.m. He was elected earlier by the Malay Rulers in the 251st Special Meeting of Conference of Rulers which was held at Istana Negara on 24 January 2019. The meeting was held upon the abdication of the previous Yang di-Pertuan Agong, Sultan Muhammad V of Kelantan who abdicated from his post on 6 January 2019. Abdullah held the position for a period of 5 years beginning on 31 January 2019.

The installation ceremony was held months after his election to allow the planning committees to make adequate preparation for it. During the ceremony, he read his Oath of Installation, and gave his first speech from the Throne. Celebrations took place across the country and commemorative coins, and stamps were issued. It was broadcast live on multiple media outlets such as television and through YouTube. This installation ceremony was a special occasion for Abdullah as it was held on his 60th birthday.

== Taking of the oath ==
On 31 January 2019, the 251st Special Conference of Rulers was held in conjunction with the Ratification of the Ceremony and Signing of the Oath of Yang di-Pertuan Agong XVI and was followed by the declaration of office.

Abdullah of Pahang and his queen consort, Tunku Azizah Aminah Maimunah Iskandariah departed at 9:15 a.m. on a special aircraft from the Royal Malaysian Air Force Base (Kuantan), Kuantan, Pahang and landed at the Kompleks Bunga Raya, Kuala Lumpur International Airport (KLIA). Both were welcomed by the Raja Muda of Selangor, Tengku Amir Shah and Tengku Laksamana of Selangor, Tengku Sulaiman Shah as representatives from the Selangor Royal Family. Their arrival were also welcomed in a simple arrival ceremony, conducted by the Guard of honour, consisting of two officers and 26 members of the 1st Battalion of the Royal Ranger Regiment, led by Captain Abdul Munir Mohani @ Che Omar. The couple then headed to Parliament Square for a formal reception by the country's leaders and was welcomed by the Prime Minister of Malaysia Mahathir Mohamad and his wife Siti Hasmah Mohamad Ali along with Deputy Prime Minister of Malaysia Wan Azizah Wan Ismail and husband Anwar Ibrahim, before leaving for Istana Negara.

At the Istana Negara, Abdullah received the royal salute from the First Battalion of Royal Ranger Regiment consisting of three officers and 31 soldiers, and led by Major Mohd Azwan Ariff Mohd Azawi. At the same time, the Royal Ranger Regiment Center Band consisting of an officer and 33 members led by Major Abdul Aziz Abdullah played "Negaraku".

Abdullah was then accompanied by the Rulers and the State Governors to the Balairung Seri.

The special meeting was chaired by Sharafuddin of Selangor. The Keeper of the Rulers' Seal, Datuk Syed Danial Syed Ahmad, who was inaugurating the ceremony, appeared before the Rulers and the State Governors, to deliver the Oath of Allegiance to Abdullah. Abdullah then pronounced the Oath before signing it. The oath of office was later signed by Mizan Zainal Abidin of Terengganu and Sirajuddin of Perlis as witnesses. Syed Danial then presented the oath of office for the Deputy Yang di-Pertuan Agong to Nazrin Shah of Perak. He then pronounced the oath of office as the Deputy Yang di-Pertuan Agong before signing it himself. His oath of office was also signed by Mizan Zainal Abidin of Terengganu and Sirajuddin of Perlis as witnesses.

The event at the Balairong Seri was followed by the ceremony of signing the declaration of office by the Yang di-Pertuan Agong and his deputy.

Prime Minister Mahathir Mohamad attended and presented the Decree Papers holding the office for the signing of the Yang di-Pertuan Agong and the Deputy Yang di-Pertuan Agong and read the declaration that Abdullah was officially the Head of State in accordance with Federal law and Constitution.

The ceremony was concluded with a prayer reading and a photo session with the Rulers, as well as all the State Governors, Prime Minister, Deputy Prime Minister, and Chief Ministers.

== Ceremony preparations ==
Abdullah was unable to be formally installed at his home state, Pahang after ascending the throne as the Sultan of Pahang. This is due to the short period between the date of his ascension as the Sultan and his appointment as Yang di-Pertuan Agong, which was only 2 weeks apart. Therefore, Tunku Azizah, as the Raja Permaisuri Agong, personally took part in the preparation of the ceremony to ensure the smoothness of the event.

=== Public holiday ===
On 30 May 2019, the Pahang state government announced 30 July 2019 as a public holiday in conjunction with Abdullah's birthday. Following two different events that fell on the same day, the Menteri Besar (Chief Minister), Wan Rosdy Wan Ismail in a statement issued by the Office of the Menteri Besar of Pahang, had said that the State Council Meeting on 12 June 2019 had determined that 30 July and 31 July 2019 would be a public holiday for the entire state of Pahang by virtue of the powers conferred under Subsection 9 (1) of the Holidays Act 1951 (Act 369).

The Government of Malaysia also declared 30 July 2019 as an additional public holiday throughout Malaysia in conjunction with Yang di-Pertuan Agong XVI's Coronation Day. The declaration was made by the Chief Secretary to the Government of Malaysia, Ismail Bakar, under Section 8 of the General Holidays Act 1951 (Act 369) of Peninsular Malaysia and the Federal Territory of Labuan.

=== The throne and the heritage outfit ===
For the first time in Malaysian history, the reigning royal couple are the children of the late Yang di-Pertuan Agong, the late Ahmad Shah of Pahang and Iskandar of Johor, the seventh and eighth Yang di-Pertuan Agong, respectively. Therefore, both of them, especially the Raja Permaisuri Agong, wished to restore sentimental value by reusing the thrones and royal outfits that were used during their father's installation. Thus, the thrones was brought back from the Royal Gallery of the Jaafar of Negeri Sembilan. The thrones undergo a refurbish process in order for them to be ready to be used in the installation ceremony. Tunku Azizah chose and bought songket from Brunei to be used as the cover for the throne's seat. The tapestry hang behind the throne was also designed to bring out the element of the old palace.

The Muskat and the Royal Tengkolok belong to the late Ahmad Shah of Pahang. They were used at the time of his installation as the Yang di-Pertuan Agong in 1979 and had been lent to the late Iskandar of Johor for his installation 5 years later. Iskandar of Johor did not ordered new Muskat and Tengkolok for himself because he originally wanted to wear military uniforms in his installation ceremony, as he often wore while attending official events in Johor. However, Mahathir Mohamad, who at that time was the fourth Prime Minister, had met the Sultan a week before the ceremony and begged him to wear the outfit. Iskandar decided that there wasn't enough time to ordered a new muskat to be made, therefore he borrowed the muskat from Ahmad Shah.

Although Abdullah wished to wear his father's muskat, he was unable to do so as his arm does not fit the muskat's sleeve. Therefore, Tunku Azizah ordered for a new muskat to be made, which has similar design as the old muskat.

The outfit of the Raja Permaisuri Agong was designed by Rizalman Ibrahim, a Malaysian fashion designer who had 15 years of experience in designing the Queen's outfit. Six of Tunku Azizah's outfits made in conjunction with the ceremony are made out of fabrik tenun Pahang (Pahang's woven cloth) which were woven by occupants of Penor Prison and Bentong Pahang Prison. Elements of Johor and Pahang were inserted into the fabrics on Tunku Azizah's request. Rizalman maintained a modern Baju Kurung rounded collar design, with wrinkled shoulder that has become her identity. A few pieces of gold from the jewellery collection of her mother, Enche' Besar Hajah Kalsom binti Abdullah was also sewn, bringing the element something borrowed into the outfit. He also added a layer of thin scarf to cover her chest, suitable for her style, as she wears tudung. Besides designing Tunku Azizah's outfit, Rizalman was also entrusted to design the outfits of the Sultan's children.

=== Invitation ===
Royal invitations (Malay language: Warkah Persilaan) were sent out beforehand to the other Monarchies of Malaysia to formally invite them to the ceremony and to confirm their attendance. It was a tradition that had been practiced since the first Yang di-Pertuan Agong, Abdul Rahman of Negeri Sembilan's installation ceremony. The royal invitations were designed by Tunku Azizah Aminah Maimunah herself. She instructed the makers to print all coat of arms of the Monarchies in Malaysia on the letters to symbolise unity of the monarchs.

The royal invitations were handwritten in Jawi alphabet in khat form, using the Malay language. They were written in royal dialect, and followed the protocol closely. The roval invitations were entrusted to be written by a few selected individuals. First, a khat artist named Abdul Baki Abu Bakar, from Sik, Kedah. He had also written the royal invitations to the previous installations of the Yang di-Pertuan Agong, had been devoted himself to the task since 2003. Another person was a khat expert, Jainal Sakiban from Batu Pahat, Johor, who was the Raja Permaisuri Agong's Islamic religion teacher. He has experience in writing the royal invitation for the wedding of Tuanku Sultan Ibrahim Ismail of Johor and Tuanku Raja Zarith Sofiah.

The messengers of the royal invitations are a representative from Istana Negara, Datuk Paduka Maharaja Lela, Azuan Effendy Zairakithnaini, a representative from the Prime Minister office, Mujahid Yusof Rawa, a minister in the Prime Minister department, and a representative from the Keeper of the Rulers' Seal office. The invitations were presented to the respective monarchs in a gold coloured cylinder tube, which was put on a gold coloured tray. In a few states, the messengers were ordered to read the invitation in front of the monarchs.

Royal invitations were also sent out to a few foreign monarchs, including Hassanal Bolkiah of Brunei, Sheikh Mohammed bin Zayed Al Nahyan, the crown prince of Abu Dhabi and Ali Al-Hussein of Jordan. Their royal invitations were written in jawi alphabet and in Malay language but the Ministry of Foreign Affairs will translate them into their respected language.

== Installation ceremony ==
=== Guests ===
Guests started arriving at Istana Negara as early as 8 am. General guests were immediately ushered to their seat at Balairung Seri by the palace officials, while the main guests were shown to Dewan Seri Maharaja.

The commencement of the ceremony was marked by the arrival of the King, the Queens and the First Lords of the State at 9 a.m. The Pecah Bendera ceremony, in which the personal flags were broken and fluttered to mark the arrival of the main guests of the palace was held. The following is a list of guests arriving at the Main Gate of the Istana Negara in order of arrival. They arrived according to the Malaysian order of precedence, from lowest to highest.

1. Deputy Prime Minister of Malaysia, Wan Azizah Wan Ismail and husband, Anwar Ibrahim
2. Prime Minister of Malaysia, Mahathir Mohamad and wife, Siti Hasmah Mohamad Ali
3. Tunku Temenggong of Johor, Tunku Idris Iskandar Al-Haj
4. Tunku Besar Seri Menanti of Negeri Sembilan, Tunku Ali Redhauddin
5. Crown Prince of Kelantan, Dr. Tengku Muhammad Fa-iz Petra and his consort, Che Puan Sofie Louise Johansson
6. Yang di-Pertua Negeri of Sarawak, Tun Pehin Sri Abdul Taib Mahmud and wife, Toh Puan Datuk Patinggi Hajah Ragad Kurdi Taib
7. Yang di-Pertua Negeri of Sabah, Tun Datuk Seri Panglima Juhar Mahiruddin and wife, Toh Puan Datin Seri Panglima Hajah Norlidah binti Dato’ RM Jasni
8. Yang di-Pertua Negeri of Malacca, Tun Datuk Seri Utama Mohd Khalil Yaakob and wife, Toh Puan Datuk Seri Utama Zurina Kassim
9. Yang di-Pertua Negeri of Penang, Tun Dato’ Seri Utama Abdul Rahman Abbas and wife, Toh Puan Dato' Seri Utama Hajah Majimor binti Shariff
10. Regent of Perlis, Tuanku Syed Faizuddin Putra Jamalullail and his consort, Tuanku Hajah Lailatul Shahreen Akashah Khalil
11. Regent of Pahang, Tengku Hassanal Ibrahim Alam Shah
12. Sultan of Kedah, Sultan Sallehuddin and his sultanah consort, Sultanah Maliha
13. Sultan of Perak, Sultan Nazrin Muizzuddin Shah and his queen consort Tuanku Zara Salim
14. Sultan of Selangor, Sultan Sharafuddin Idris Shah and his queen consort, Tengku Permaisuri Norashikin
15. Sultan of Terengganu, Sultan Mizan Zainal Abidin and his sultanah consort, Sultanah Nur Zahirah
16. Abu Dhabi Crown Prince and United Arab Emirates Deputy Supreme Commander Sheikh Mohammed Zayed Al Nahyan
17. Sultan of Brunei, Sultan Hassanal Bolkiah and his queen consort, Pengiran Anak Hajah Saleha

=== Arrival honours ===
The arrival of both Yang di-Pertuan Agong and Raja Permaisuri Agong at the Istana Negara at 10:00 a.m. MYT was welcomed by the Prime Minister and Deputy Prime Minister to the Istana Negara, preceded by the sounding of fanfare trumpets of the Central Band of the Royal Armoured Corps. The arrival honours to their Majesties was done by a guard of honour company of the 1st Battalion, Royal Malay Regiment, wherein the Central Band of the Royal Malay Regiment played the National Anthem Negaraku upon his arrival and later on following the King's review of the company and the battalion's King's and Regimental Colours.

=== Ceremony ===
The Yang di-Pertuan Agong and the Raja Permaisuri Agong then went to the Seri Maharaja Hall. Later, the main guests arrived to take their places at the Balairong Seri (throne room) together from the Seri Maharaja Hall according to the order of precedence.

Abdullah and Tengku Azizah entered the Balairong Seri on 10:45 a.m. The couple were escorted in by the Grand Chamberlain of the Royal Household (Datuk Paduka Maharaja Lela), Azuan Effendy Zairakithnaini, and palace officers bearing the Regalia of Malaysia together with their aides-de-camp. The royal couple took their seat at the throne. Their entrance were accompanied by Nobat Diraja Terengganu (Terengganu royal orchestra), who played the song Raja Berangkat (the King has arrived).

Azuan Effendy then returned to the room with the Datuk Penghulu Istiadat, Pegawai Agama Istana Negara and a few palace officials who brought in a Quran and a few other regalias while the Royal Nobat performed the song "Menjunjung Duli". Azuan Effendy retrieved the Quran from the bearer. He approached the throne, stopping on the third step. He then presented the Qur'an to Abdullah. Abdullah accepted it, and show his respect by kissing the holy book before putting it on the special rehal which was located on the small table in between the royal couple.

Azuan then passed the Proclamation of Installation to the Prime Minister, Mahathir Mohamad, to be read. The proclamation then followed, in English:

In the name of God, Most Gracious, Most Merciful, this is to proclaim to all the people of Malaysia that His Royal Highness Al-Sultan Abdullah Ri'ayatuddin Al-Mustafa Billah Shah ibni Almarhum Sultan Ahmad Shah Al-Musta'in Billah has been duly elected by Their Royal Highnesses the Rulers of Malaysia, and today, on this auspicious and glorious day and time, shall be installed as the duly enthroned ruler of the Malaysian Nation with the title of His Majesty the sixteenth Yang di-Pertuan Agong.

Afterwards, the Grand Chamberlain presented the Government Kris to Abdullah. Abdullah unsheathed the kris and kissed it, symbolising the power of the sovereign. He returned the kris back to its scabbard and put it on the table to his left.

The ceremony followed with the reading of the Oath of Installation out loud by Abdullah. The audience stood up in respect. The Oath went as follows, in English:

In the Name of God, Most Gracious and Most Merciful: We, Al-Sultan Abdullah Ri'ayatuddin Al-Mustafa Billah Shah ibni Almarhum Sultan Ahmad Shah Al-Musta'in Billah, are truly grateful to God the Almighty, the Blessed, because of this election to the honourable office of the sixteenth Yang di-Pertuan Agong that has been happened because of His Benevolent Grace. Therefore, we shall justly and faithfully perform our duties in the administration of the nation of Malaysia, in accordance to its laws and its sacred constitution, shall protect the Islamic religion at all times as mandated, and shall duly fulfil the rules of law and order and promote good governance in our country.

After Abdullah finished reciting his oath, the nobat immediately played Raja Bertabal (King was installed) as the oath paper was returned to the Grand Chamberlain.

Azuan then led the threefold acclamation Daulat Tuanku! (Long Live the King!) by the crowd, which was repeated thrice. Then, Negaraku was played again, accompanied by a 21 gun salute which were given by the Royal Artillery Regiment.

The prime minister, Mahathir read the congratulatory speech to the Yang di-Pertuan Agong representing the government and people. He asserted his loyalty to the throne in the speech.

Abdullah then gave his first Speech from the Throne. In his address, Abdullah professed his wish to generate unity and tolerance between people of different races and religions, by prioritising the people, respecting the elders and honouring the youngsters. He also reminded the people not to fight among themselves as unity and tolerance are the pillars of strength of the country. He also extend his gratitude towards the government on all their efforts in bettering the country in many aspects.

The Palace Islamic Affairs Officer, Datuk Abd Aziz Che Yacob led a prayer, concluding the ceremony. The guests then stood again as Abdullah and Tunku Azizah left the Balairung Seri, escorted by the Azuan Effendy and Datuk Pengelola Bijaya Diraja, and the personnels bearing the royal regalia. The Nobat accompanied them with the song Raja Berangkat (King is leaving).

== Royal Dinner ==
The Malay Rulers and royal guests attended the Royal Dinner in conjunction with the installation of the Yang di-Pertuan Agong XVI on 31 July 2019 at 8.30 p.m. at the National Palace's main dining hall. The meal served at the Royal Dining Room were selected by Tunku Azizah herself.

== Celebrations ==
=== Commemorative stamps ===
Commemorative stamps were released by Pos Malaysia in celebration of Abdullah's installation. Only 300,000 stamps were printed and they were released in three variations. The first featured Abdullah in military attire. The second is Abdullah in his Yang di-Pertuan Agong attire, complete with muskat, tengkolok and kris. The third variation is of Abdullah and Tunku Azizah in the same attire as in their official portraits, Abdullah in his Yang di-Pertuan Agong attire and Tunku Azizah in royal yellow baju kurung, scarf and Gendik Diraja. Pos Malaysia also released a mini-sheet, featuring the picture of Abdullah during his Oath taking ceremony earlier this year. The stamps and mini-sheet were also sold in the form of first day covers (FDC).

=== Commemorative coins ===
Commemorative coins were released by Bank Negara Malaysia in conjunction with the installation ceremony. They were produced in three types, gold, silver and Nordic gold. Portrait of Abdullah were carved at the front of the coins while the back featured Malaysia's coat of arms. The coins were released in limited quantity. Only 300 pieces of the gold coins, 1,500 pieces of the silver coins and 15,000 pieces of the Nordic gold coins were made. They are available for purchase on Bank Negara Malaysia's website starting August 2019.

== See also ==
- Installation of the Yang di-Pertuan Agong
