= Tengku Puteri Iman Afzan =

Malaysian activist (born 1992)

- Tengku Puteri Raja
- Born: Tengku Puteri Iman Afzan binti Tengku Abdullah Al-Haj; 11 November 1992 (age 33); Kuala Lumpur, Malaysia
- Spouse: Tengku Dato’ Sri Abu Bakar Ahmad (m. 2018; div. 2024)
- Issue: Tengku Zayn Edin Shah; Tengku Aleya Norlini
Names
- Tengku Puteri Iman Afzan binti Al-Sultan Abdullah Ri'ayatuddin Al-Mustafa Billah Shah
- House: Bendahara (by birth)
- Father: Al-Sultan Abdullah Ri’ayatuddin Al-Mustafa Billah Shah
- Mother: Julia Abdul Rais; Tunku Azizah Aminah Maimunah Iskandariah (Stepmother)
- Religion: Sunni Islam
- Occupation: Activist

Tengku Puteri Iman Afzan binti Al-Sultan Abdullah Ri'ayatuddin Al-Mustafa Billah Shah (born 11 November 1992) is a Malaysian mental health activist and member of the Pahang royal family who is the Tengku Puteri Raja. She is the eldest daughter of Al-Sultan Abdullah, the 6th Sultan of Pahang and 16th Yang di-Pertuan Agong (King) of Malaysia. She serves as the royal patron of the J’keb Foundation and the National Coalition for Mental Wellbeing. Tengku Iman was appointed by the World Health Organization to serve as the International Patron of World Mental Health Day in 2020.

== Early life ==
Tengku Iman was born at Pantai Hospital in Kuala Lumpur on 11 November 1992. She is the daughter of Al-Sultan Abdullah, the 6th Sultan of Pahang and 16th Yang di-Pertuan Agong, and his second wife Che Puan Julia Rais, a former actress and model. She is of English and Malay descent. She is Al-Sultan Abdullah's eldest daughter and the eldest child from his second marriage.

She attended the University of Nottingham in England where she studied political science.

== Activism and patronages ==
On 18 September 2019, Tengku Iman accepted her appointment as the patron of the J’keb Foundation, which provides support for underprivileged teenagers and runs a transition home for aged-out orphans that are required to leave orphanages when they turn eighteen.

Tengku Iman served as Malaysia's Royal Patron of the Mental Illness Awareness and Support Association from 2018 to 2020. She was named as the International Patron of World Mental Health Day in 2020 by the World Health Organization following a recommendation made by the World Federation for Mental Health. Her term as international patron ended in October 2021. She is also one of the jurors on the My Mind On Film Festival Competition.

On 10 September 2020, World Suicide Prevention Day, Tengku Iman called for reform to suicide legislation in Malaysia, urging the federal government to decriminalize suicide in order to end the stigmatization of mental health, while speaking at the launch of the Mental Illness Awareness and Support Association's new crisis management centre at the Orchid Clubhouse in Petaling Jaya. She stated that criminalizing suicide does not address the underlying factors and does not help reduce the number of suicides committed in Malaysia. Tengku Iman went on to say that the current laws discourage people suffering with mental illnesses to seek help and treatment. Elaborating on Malaysia's efforts to manage the COVID-19 pandemic, she said she was certain that the country's public health standards should include mental healthcare. On 10 October 2020, she was joined by her father and her stepmother, Tunku Azizah Aminah Maimunah Iskandariah, in wearing green ribbons to show support for World Mental Health Day. On 5 November 2020, Tengku Iman hosted a virtual meeting via Zoom Video Communications with students at HELP University and abroad in the United Kingdom to discuss mental health at universities. She addressed additional strains on mental health due to the COVID-19 pandemic, causing isolation from friends and family, and offered solutions to support good mental health.

On 10 December 2020, she was appointed as the Royal Patron of the National Coalition for Mental Wellbeing. She co-founded her own platform called the Green Ribbon Group which aims to push forward the mental health agenda and de-stigmatise mental illnesses in Malaysia. In 2020, in recommendation by the World Federation for Mental Health, she was named International Patron of World Mental Health Day by the World Health Organization.

In March 2021, she founded a social enterprise called "Green Ribbon Group" to help promote the mental health program in Malaysia; regarding the creation of this initiative, the Princess released a statement talking about how Covid-19 has contributed to the spread of problems among people. In November 2021, the Tengku Puteri was present at the launch of the Suria KLCC Group Mental Health Campaign, in Kuala Lumpur, where she toured the structure and delivered a speech. In December 2021, she was named representative of the United Nations World Federation for Mental Health of the United Nations (ONU). Regarding her appointment, the Princess said she was "honored".

In January 2022, she was present at the Green Ribbon Effective Agent Training advocacy training course at the University of Malaya Alumni Association Building: the goal of the Great Project is to guide students in offering help to cope with crises, connecting those suffering from mental distress. In June 2022, it was announced that Tengku Puteri Iman, as Patron, would have led the Malaysian delegation to the 23rd Congress of the World Federation for Mental Health in London (which was held in June). At the event, she read her speech titled "Mental health: We can and must do better".

== Marriage and issue ==
On 4 August 2018, Tengku Iman married Yang Mulia Tengku Dato’ Sri Abu Bakar Ahmad bin Tengku Arif Bendahara Tengku Tan Sri Abdullah. They were divorced in 2024.

On 23 July 2019, Tengku Iman gave birth to a son, named Tengku Zayn Edin Shah. On 2 February 2022, she gave birth to a daughter, named Tengku Aleya Norlini.

== Honours ==
=== Honours of Pahang ===
- Pahang
  - Knight Grand Companion of the Order of Al-Sultan Abdullah of Pahang (SAAS) – Dato' Sri Setia (30 July 2024)
  - Grand Knight of the Order of Sultan Ahmad Shah of Pahang (SSAP) – Dato' Sri (15 August 2020)

=== Honorary doctorate ===
- Malaysia
  - Honorary degree Doctor of the University from the Heriot-Watt University Malaysia - (17 November 2022)
