= Tengku Hassanal Ibrahim Alam Shah =

Crown Prince of Pahang (born 1995)

- Tengku Mahkota Pahang; lit. 'Crown Prince of Pahang'
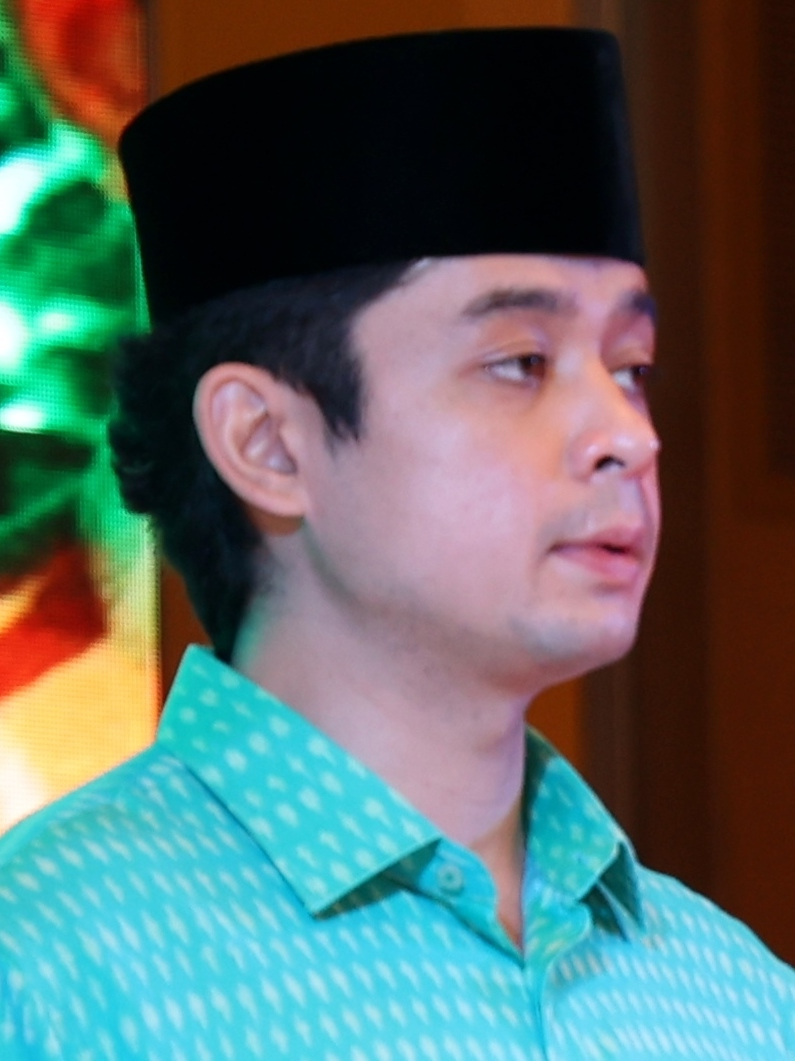
- Hassanal in 2022
- Born: Tengku Hassanal Ibrahim Alam Shah ibni Tengku Abdullah; 17 September 1995 (age 31); Tengku Ampuan Afzan Hospital, Kuantan, Pahang, Malaysia
Names
- Tengku Hassanal Ibrahim Alam Shah ibni Al-Sultan Abdullah Ri’ayatuddin Al-Mustafa Billah Shah
- House: Bendahara dynasty
- Father: Al-Sultan Abdullah Ri'ayatuddin Al-Mustafa Billah Shah
- Mother: Tunku Azizah Aminah Maimunah Iskandariah
- Religion: Sunni Islam
- Military career
- Allegiance: Malaysia
- Branch: Malaysian Army; Royal Malaysian Air Force
- Service years: 2019–present
- Rank: See list
- Units: 12th Battalion (Mechanised) of the Royal Malay Regiment; 4th Mechanised Brigade; RMAF Regiment

Tengku Hassanal Ibrahim Alam Shah ibni Al-Sultan Abdullah Ri’ayatuddin Al-Mustafa Billah Shah (born 17 September 1995) is the heir apparent to the Pahang throne.

Tengku Hassanal was born during the reign of his grandfather, Sultan Ahmad Shah, and became heir apparent when his father, Al-Sultan Abdullah Ri’ayatuddin Al-Mustafa Billah Shah acceded to the throne of Pahang in 2019. He is the second son of the Sultan of Pahang, Al-Sultan Abdullah Ri’ayatuddin Al-Mustafa Billah Shah and the Tengku Ampuan of Pahang, Tunku Azizah Aminah Maimunah Iskandariah. He served as the Regent of Pahang while his father reigned as the 16th Yang di-Pertuan Agong of Malaysia from January 2019 to January 2024.

== Early life ==
Tengku Hassanal Ibrahim Alam Shah was born on 17 September 1995 at Tengku Ampuan Afzan Hospital, Kuantan, Pahang. He is the fourth child and second son and thus heir to the Tengku Mahkota (Crown Prince) of Pahang at that time, Tengku Abdullah Al-Haj ibni Sultan Ahmad Shah and his consort the Tengku Puan (Crown Princess) of Pahang Tunku Hajah Azizah Aminah Maimunah Iskandariah binti Sultan Iskandar. His eldest brother, Tengku Ahmad Iskandar Shah died immediately after he was born.

== Education ==
He began his education at Sekolah Rendah Kebangsaan St. Thomas in Kuantan, and completed his secondary and upper secondary at Caldicott School and Sherborne School, United Kingdom. At the Geneva School of Diplomacy and International Relations, he completed a Bachelor's Degree in International Relations.

On 13 September 2022, he pursued his postgraduate studies at the Lee Kuan Yew School of Public Policy, National University of Singapore.

== Tengku Panglima Besar of Pahang ==
Tengku Hassanal was appointed by his grandfather, Sultan Haji Ahmad Shah Al-Musta’in Billah as Tengku Panglima Besar of Pahang on 18 June 2018.

== Military career ==
As heir to the throne of Pahang, Tengku Hassanal had undergone military training at Royal Military Academy Sandhurst, United Kingdom for 44 weeks in 2019. He graduated from Sandhurst on 13 December 2019 with other 242 cadet officers commissioned at the Sovereign's Parade at Sandhurst, graced by Sophie, Countess of Wessex, as a representative of Queen Elizabeth II.

On 21 January 2020, Tengku Hassanal and his brother, Tengku Amir Nasser Ibrahim, were commissioned into the Malaysian Army by their father, Al-Sultan Abdullah. Tengku Hassanal was appointed to the rank of second lieutenant, while Tengku Amir was conferred the rank of lieutenant colonel. Following the completion of his initial military education, Tengku Hassanal was posted to the 12th Battalion (Mechanised), Royal Malay Regiment under the 4th Mechanised Brigade, based in Pahang.

During his service with the mechanised infantry, Tengku Hassanal developed an interest in elite forces. On 4 March 2021, he enrolled in a four-week Basic Sniper Course at the Special Warfare Training Centre in Camp Sungai Udang. He successfully completed the programme and was awarded the Basic Sniper Skill Badge.

In 2025, he volunteered for special forces selection with the Royal Malaysian Air Force (RMAF). He participated in the Basic PASKAU Commando Course Series 32/25, which took place at the RMAF Combat Training School at RMAF Bukit Ibam Air Base from 28 July to 26 September 2025. Tengku Hassanal was one of 23 personnel to graduate from the course. He was personally presented with the blue RMAF Special Forces beret by Al-Sultan Abdullah, who serves as the Air Commodore-in-Chief of the RMAF and the Colonel-in-Chief of the RMAF Regiment. With the completion of this training, he became the first immediate member of the Pahang Royal Family to pass Malaysian special forces selection.

Upon his graduation from the commando course, Tengku Hassanal was promoted to the rank of major in the Royal Malaysian Air Force. On 31 July 2026, he completed his helicopter flight training as a Royal Malaysian Air Force (RMAF) pilot.

== Tengku Mahkota of Pahang ==
Tengku Hassanal was made the Tengku Mahkota of Pahang on 22 January 2019. He served as Regent of Pahang while his father reigned as the Yang di-Pertuan Agong from January 2019 to 2024.

The traditional proclamation ceremony was held on 29 January 2019 at Balairung Seri, Istana Abu Bakar, Pekan where Tengku Hassanal took his oath of office and allegiance in front of his parents, family and state dignitaries. Two days later, his parents, the Sultan of Pahang, Al-Sultan Abdullah Ri’ayatuddin Al-Mustafa Billah Shah and the Tengku Ampuan of Pahang, Tunku Azizah Aminah Maimunah Iskandariah departed for Kuala Lumpur to reign as the Yang di-Pertuan Agong and the Raja Permaisuri Agong.

His first official duty as Regent of Pahang was when he became the state representative at the Swearing in ceremony of his father, Al-Sultan Abdullah as the 16th Yang di-Pertuan Agong of Malaysia on 31 January 2019. He also became Pahang's representative on his father's installation ceremony on 30 July 2019.

As Tengku Mahkota, Tengku Hassanal holds a number of positions, including as Chancellor of the Universiti Islam Pahang Sultan Ahmad Shah (UniPSAS) and President of the State Islamic Religious and Malay Customs Council (MUIP).

== Titles, styles, honours and recognitions ==
Styles of Tengku Hassanal Ibrahim Alam Shah
- Reference style: His Royal Highness
- Spoken style: Your Royal Highness
- Alternative style: Tuanku

The full title and style of Tengku Hassanal Ibrahim Alam Shah is:

His Royal Highness Tengku Hassanal Ibrahim Alam Shah ibni Al-Sultan Abdullah Ri'ayatuddin Al-Mustafa Billah Shah, D.K., S.A.A.S., S.S.A.P., S.I.M.P., Grand Officer of the Order of Saint-Charles (Monaco), Tengku Mahkota of Pahang

=== Military ranks ===
United Kingdom

- British Army
  - 11 February 2019: Officer cadet

Malaysia

- Malaysian Army
  - 21 January 2020: Leftenan Muda ('Second lieutenant'), The Royal Malay Regiment
  - 8 January 2021: Leftenan ('Lieutenant'), The Royal Malay Regiment
  - 19 January 2023: Kapten ('Captain'), The Royal Malay Regiment
- Royal Malaysian Air Force
  - 18 October 2025: Mejar TUDM ('Major, RMAF'), The RMAF Regiment

=== Honours ===
==== Honours of Pahang ====
- Member 1st class of the Family Order of the Crown of Indra of Pahang (DK I) (2019)
- Knight Grand Companion of the Order of Al-Sultan Abdullah of Pahang (SAAS) – Dato' Sri Setia (2024)
- Grand Knight of the Order of Sultan Ahmad Shah of Pahang (SSAP) – Dato' Sri (2016)
- Grand Knight of the Order of the Crown of Pahang (SIMP) – Dato' Indera
- Recipient of the Sultan Ahmad Shah Silver Jubilee Medal (1999)

==== Honours of Malaysia ====
- Malaysia
  - Recipient of the General Service Medal (PPA)
  - Recipient of the 16th Yang di-Pertuan Agong Installation Medal
  - Recipient of the 17th Yang di-Pertuan Agong Installation Medal
- Perlis
  - Recipient of Tuanku Syed Sirajuddin Jamalullail Silver Jubilee Medal (2025)

==== Foreign honours ====
- Monaco
  - Grand Officer of the Order of Saint-Charles (27 November 2023)
- United Kingdom
  - Recipient of the Sandhurst Medal

=== Places named after him ===
Several places were named after him, including:

- Tengku Hassanal Wildlife Reserve in Titiwangsa Mountains, Pahang
- Tengku Mahkota Tengku Hassanal Ibrahim Alam Shah Mosque in Kuantan, Pahang
- Tengku Mahkota Tengku Hassanal Ibrahim Alam Shah Mosque in Temerloh, Pahang
- Tengku Mahkota Tengku Hassanal Ibrahim Alam Shah Mosque in Rompin, Pahang
- Tengku Mahkota Tengku Hassanal Ibrahim Alam Shah Mosque in Universiti Islam Pahang Sultan Ahmad Shah (UniPSAS), Kuantan, Pahang

Tengku Hassanal Ibrahim Alam Shah House of Bendahara, Pahang Born: 17 September 1995
Malaysian royalty
Lines of succession
| Preceded by Abdullah of Pahang | Line of succession to the throne of Pahang; 1st in line | Followed by Tengku Muhammad Iskandar Riayatuddin Shah |
Regnal titles
| Preceded by Tengku Abdullah | Tengku Mahkota of Pahang; 2019–present | Incumbent |
