= Julia Rais =

Malaysian actress and royal

- The Most Honourable Che Puan
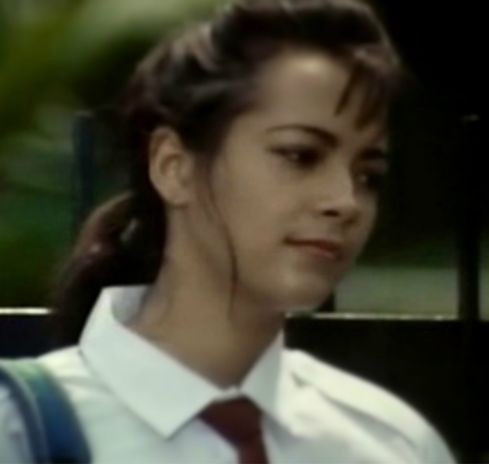
- Born: Julia binti Abdul Rais; 19 February 1971 (age 55); Kota Bharu, Kelantan Malaysia
- Spouse: Al-Sultan Abdullah Ri'ayatuddin Al-Mustafa Billah Shah (m. 1991)
- Issue: Tengku Puteri Raja Tengku Puteri Iman Afzan; Tengku Puteri Raja Tengku Puteri Ilisha Ameera; Tengku Puteri Raja Tengku Puteri Ilyana Alia
Names
- Julia binti Abdul Rais
- House: Bendahara (by marriage)
- Father: Abdul Rais Yeop
- Religion: Sunni Islam
- Occupation: Actress, model

Che Puan Julia Abdul Rais (born 19 February 1971) is a Malaysian former model and actress. She is a member of the Bendahara dynasty by marriage, as the second wife of Abdullah of Pahang, the 6th modern Sultan of Pahang and 16th Yang di-Pertuan Agong of Malaysia.

Julia had a successful, but short, career in Malaysia as a film actress in the early 1990s and was known for her European features. She played the title character in the 1990 films Isabella and Mira Edora and in the 1992 film Nadia. Julia also had roles in the films Hati Bukan Kristal, Driving School, and Suci Dalam Debu. She received two awards and a nomination for Best Actress at the 9th Malaysian Film Festival in 1991. She ended her acting career shortly after marrying into the Pahang royal family.

== Early life and family ==
Julia was born in Kota Bharu, Kelantan on 19 February 1971. She is of Malay and English ancestry. She is the daughter of Abdul Rais Yeop, a Malaysian businessman and former board member of Sri Jaya Vehicles, from his second marriage to an English wife. She grew up in Damansara Jaya with her late father and late stepmother, Zaedah-tul Laily @ Lily Ibrahim. She has a sister, the late Zalina, and two stepsiblings, Mohd Rafiza and Fazlyn. She is also a cousin of the politician Mohamed Nazri Abdul Aziz and a step-cousin of award-winning actress Juliana Ibrahim.

== Career ==
Julia began acting and modelling in the late 1980s in television commercials for Procter & Gamble and Rejoice Shampoo. Her first film was the 1990 romance film Isabella, where she played the title character. From 1990 to 1992 she appeared in several films as a supporting character. She played Nina, a journalist, in the film Hati Bukan Kristal and was the lead role in the comedy Driving School. She also had lead roles in the films Mira Edora, Nadia, and Suci Dalam Debu.

At the Malaysian Film Festival in 1991, Julia won the Bintang Harapan Award and the Best Film Award for Hati Bukan Kristal and was nominated for Best Actress for Mira Edora.

She ended her career in the entertainment industry shortly after marrying into the Pahang royal family.

== Marriage and issue ==
In 1991, she married Al-Sultan Abdullah, who was then the heir-apparent to the Sultanate of Pahang, as his second wife. Her husband's first wife is Tunku Azizah Aminah Maimunah Iskandariah. They had a private ceremony at Fraser's Hill.

Upon her marriage, she was bestowed the honorific prefix of Che Puan (equivalent to the English "Lady") as a Sultan's consort that was of non-royal blood. She is styled as Yang Amat Berbahagia (The Most Honourable).

Her husband succeeded his father as the sixth Sultan of modern Pahang on 15 January 2019. He was the sixteenth Yang di-Pertuan Agong (King of Malaysia) from 31 January 2019 until 30 January 2024.

She and the sultan have three daughters together:

- Her Highness Tengku Puteri Raja Tengku Puteri Iman Afzan (born on 11 November 1992); married His Highness Tengku Abu Bakar Ahmad bin Almarhum Tengku Arif Bendahara Tengku Abdullah
  - His Highness Tengku Zayn Edin Shah (born on 23 July 2019)
  - Her Highness Tengku Aleya Norlini (born on 2 February 2022)
- Her Highness Tengku Puteri Raja Tengku Puteri Ilisha Ameera (born on 1 October 1993)
- Her Highness Tengku Puteri Raja Tengku Puteri Ilyana Alia (born on 20 April 1997); married Christopher Lionel Froggatt

== Personal life ==
Julia is a practitioner of Sunni Islam and a spiritual follower of Yasmin Mogahed.

She lives in Great Britain with her mother, who is British.

== Filmography ==
=== Film ===
Year	Title	Role	Director	Notes
1990	Isabella	Rozi	Marwan Alkatiri	a Malaysia - Indonesia joint venture film
1990	Hati Bukan Kristal	Nina	Raja Ahmad Alauddin	
1990	Mira Edora	Mira Edora	Zulkifli M. Osman	
1990	Driving School	Sally	Othman Hafsham	
1992	Nadia	Nadia	Rahman Adam	
1992	Suci Dalam Debu	Rina	Zulkifli M. Osman	

=== Television film ===
Year	Title	Role	TV Channel	Notes
1990	Surat Untuk Aminah		TV1	
1990	Mona	Mona	TV1	
1991	Siapa Bunuh Alice?	Julia	TV1	

=== Television ===
Year	Title	Role	TV Channel	Notes
1990	2+1	Sofi	TV3	Episode: "Sofi"

=== Advertisement ===
Tahun	Title	Notes
1989	Rejoice Shampoo	
1989	Salem cigarettes	
1990	Nestle Coffee-mate	

=== Videography ===
Music videos
Year	Song title	Singer
1989	"Isabella"	Amy Search
