= Tunku Azizah Aminah Maimunah Iskandariah =

Queen consort of Pahang since 2019

Tunku Azizah Aminah Maimunah Iskandariah عزيزة أمينة ميمونة إسكندرية
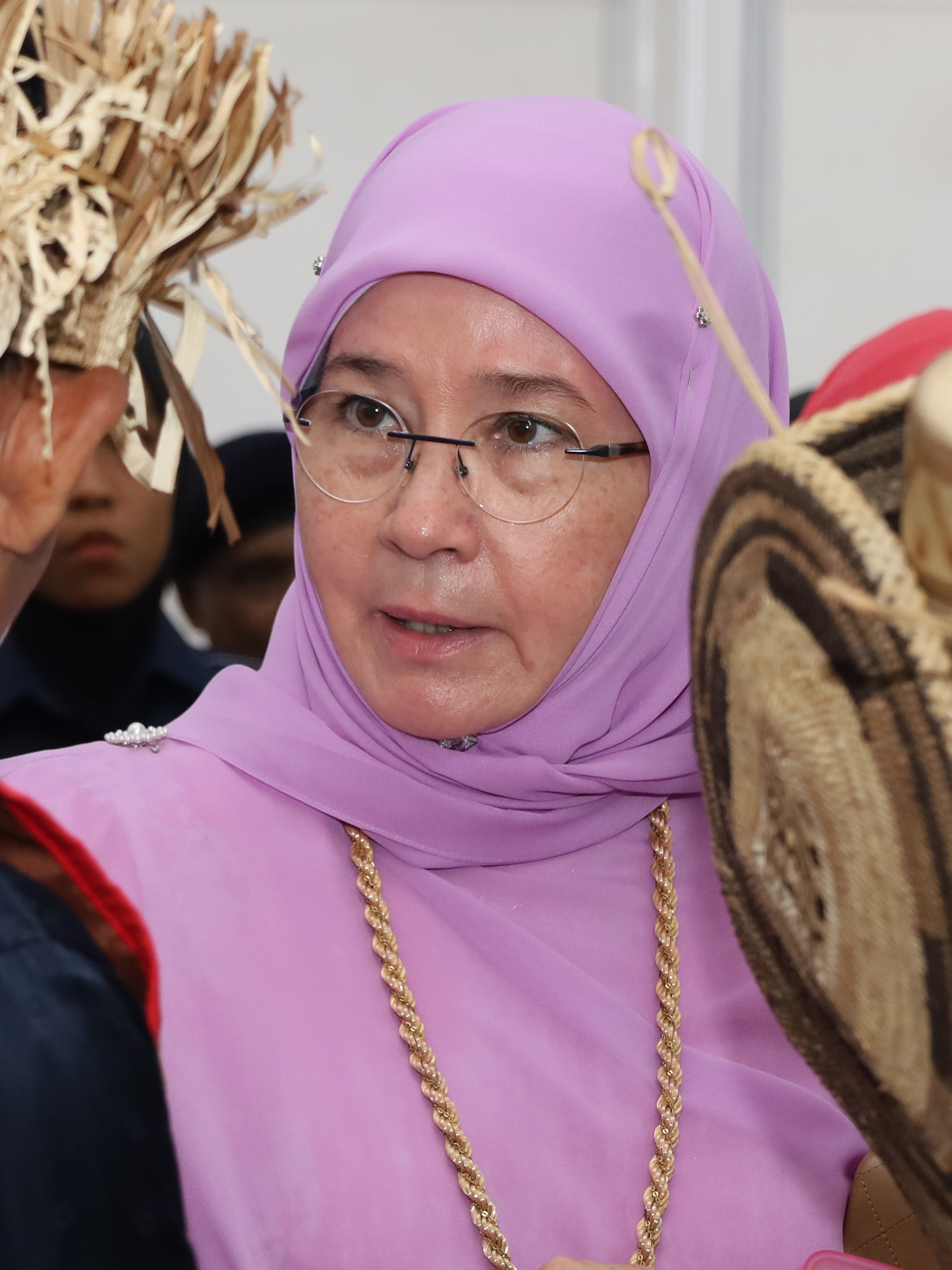
- Tunku Azizah in 2024

Queen consort of Malaysia
- Tenure: 31 January 2019 – 30 January 2024
- Installation: 30 July 2019
- Predecessor: Tuanku Hajah Haminah
- Successor: Raja Zarith Sofiah

Tengku Ampuan of Pahang
- Tenure: 22 January 2019 – present
- Proclamation: 29 January 2019
- Predecessor: Sultanah Kalsom (as Sultanah)

Tengku Puan of Pahang
- Tenure: 6 March 1986 – 22 January 2019
- Predecessor: Tengku Hajah Afzan
- Born: Tunku Azizah Aminah Maimunah Iskandariah binti Tunku Mahmood Iskandar; 5 August 1960 (age 66); Istana Bukit Stulang, Johor Bahru, Johor, Federation of Malaya
- Spouse: Al-Sultan Abdullah Ri’ayatuddin Al-Mustafa Billah Shah (m. 1986)
- Issue: Tengku Amir Nasser Ibrahim Shah (adopted); Tengku Ahmad Iskandar Shah (deceased); Tengku Hassanal Ibrahim Alam Shah; Tengku Muhammad Iskandar Ri'ayatuddin Shah; Tengku Ahmad Ismail Mu’adzam Shah; Tengku Puteri Afzan Aminah Hafidzatullah; Tengku Puteri Jihan Azizah 'Athiyatullah
Names
- Tunku Azizah Aminah Maimunah Iskandariah binti Tunku Mahmood Iskandar
Regnal name
- Tunku Azizah Aminah Maimunah Iskandariah binti Almarhum Sultan Iskandar Al-Haj
- House: Bendahara (by marriage); Temenggong (by birth)
- Father: Al-Mutawakkil Alallah Sultan Iskandar Al-Haj
- Mother: Enche’ Besar Hajah Khalsom
- Religion: Sunni Islam

Tunku Azizah Aminah Maimunah Iskandariah binti Almarhum Sultan Iskandar Al-Haj (Jawi: تونكو عزيزة أمينة ميمونة إسكندرية بنت المرحوم سلطان إسكندر الحاج; born 5 August 1960) is the Tengku Ampuan (Queen consort) of Pahang as the first wife of Al-Sultan Abdullah Ri'ayatuddin Al-Mustafa Billah Shah. Previously, she was the 16th Raja Permaisuri Agong (Queen of Malaysia) during her husband's reign as the 16th Yang di-Pertuan Agong from 2019 to 2024. She is also the younger sister of the 17th and current Yang di-Pertuan Agong, Sultan Ibrahim.

Tengku Ampuan of Pahang is a title reserved for the consort and first wife of the current ruler or sultan, of noble birth, as enshrined in the Pahang State Constitution.

== Background ==
Tunku Azizah Aminah Maimunah Iskandariah is the third daughter of the late Sultan of Johor Sultan Iskandar and his first wife Enche' Besar Hajah Khalsom binti Abdullah (née Josephine Ruby Trevorrow). Her brother is the current Sultan of Johor, Sultan Ibrahim. She received her early education at Sekolah Taman Kanak-Kanak Tunku Ampuan Mariam Johor Bahru from 1962 to 1966, Sekolah Perempuan Rendah Sultan Ibrahim, Johor Bahru and continued her secondary education in Sekolah Tun Fatimah, Johor Bahru from 1973 to 1979. From 1980 to 1986, she studied at Maktab Perguruan Temenggong Ibrahim, Johor Bahru and Political Science and Sociology at National University of Singapore (NUS).

== Family ==
She married the then Tengku Mahkota (Crown Prince) of Pahang, Tengku Abdullah (later Al-Sultan Abdullah) who is the fourth child and eldest son of Sultan Ahmad Shah by his first wife, Tengku Ampuan Afzan on 6 March 1986. The solemnisation ceremony of the royal couple was held at the Sultan Abu Bakar State Mosque, Johor Bahru and the 'Istiadat Membatalkan Air Sembahyang' was held at the Istana Bukit Serene. She was proclaimed as the Tengku Puan (Crown Princess) of Pahang after the marriage. They have four sons and two daughters together. She is the first wife of Al-Sultan Abdullah; his second wife is the actress Julia Rais, whom he married in 1991.

=== Sons ===
- Tengku Ahmad Iskandar Shah, born and died on 24 July 1990 (aged 0)
- Tengku Hassanal Ibrahim Alam Shah, the Tengku Mahkota (Crown Prince) of Pahang, (Tengku Hassanal) born at Tengku Ampuan Afzan Hospital, Kuantan on 17 September 1995 (age 31)
- Tengku Muhammad Iskandar Ri'ayatuddin Shah, the Tengku Arif Bendahara (Tengku Muhammad), born on 3 August 1997 (age 29)
- Tengku Ahmad Ismail Muadzam Shah, the Tengku Panglima Perang (Tengku Ahmad), born on 11 September 2000 (age 26), twin with his sister Tengku Puteri Afzan

=== Daughters ===
- Tengku Puteri Afzan Aminah Hafidzatullah (Tengku Afzan), born on 11 September 2000 (age 26), twin with her brother Tengku Ahmad
- Tengku Puteri Jihan Azizah 'Athiyatullah (Tengku Jihan), born on 27 April 2002 (age 24)

== Activities and interests ==
Tunku Azizah Aminah Maimunah Iskandariah has a deep interest in craftwork such as needlework and weaving. She has given new life to Tenun Pahang (Pahang Weaving) and popularised the art as Tenun Pahang Diraja (Royal Pahang Woven Fabric). Its development is supervised closely by the Badan Penasihat Pembangunan Tenun Pahang Diraja (Tenun Pahang Diraja Advisory Body).

She has also set up the Institut Kemahiran Tenun Pahang Diraja Tengku Ampuan Besar Meriam Tengku Ampuan Besar Meriam Tenun Pahang Diraja Skills Institute) to train youth in uplifting the Royal Pahang Weaving at the Cultural and Craft Complex of Pulau Keladi Pekan, Pahang in 2010 in addition to founding the Yayasan Tenun Pahang Diraja (Tenun Pahang Diraja Foundation).

Tunku Azizah Aminah Maimunah Iskandariah has also founded the Tenun Pahang Diraja project at Penor Prison, Pahang. She has also established a company producing and selling woven fabric branded as CHEMINAHSAYANG. She is adept at needlework, knitting, cross stitch and embroidery. She has shared her skills with the establishment of sewing clubs in Kuantan in the early 1990s to teach the finer art of needlework. Her initiative to establish a needlework centre through the Pertubuhan Perkumpulan Perempuan (Women's Institute) in 2006 opened avenue for women to generate income through needleworks.

She is also known for her culinary skills. Her passion for cooking led her to set up a cooking school under the Women's Institute of Pahang, Sekolah Masak Tunku Azizah, as well as publish a recipe book entitled 'Air Tangan Tengku Puan Pahang' in 2005 and two other recipe books entitled Air Tangan Tengku Puan Pahang - Masakan Tradisional Pahang' and Air Tangan Tengku Puan Pahang - Manisan Tradisional Pahang' in 2018. The recipe book is now known as Air Tangan Tengku Ampuan Pahang. She was also appointed as the Royal Patron of Persatuan Jurumasak Pantai Timur dan Malaysia.

Tunku Azizah Aminah Maimunah Iskandariah is also active in the Girl Guides Association and has been appointed to several positions locally and internationally. Amongst them are President of the Girl Guides Association of Malaysia, Pahang Branch, and Deputy President of the Girl Guides Association of Malaysia from 1999 to 2011.

In 2005, she was appointed as Royal Patron of the Friends of Asia Pacific WAGGGS (FAPW) with membership of 27 countries in the Asia Pacific region. Due to her commitment in empowering women, she was appointed as President of Southeast Asia and the Far East Region, International Rural Women's Association from 2010 to 2016. Prior to this, she was Deputy President of the United Nations International Rural Women's Association Committee from 2007 to 2010. As Board Member and Benefactor of the Olave Baden-Powell Society, supporting the World Association of Girl Guides and Girl Scouts (WAGGGS) philanthropically, she is determined to develop the potential of young girls and women to the international arena through Girl Guiding and Girl Scouting.

In 1989, Tunku Azizah Aminah Maimunah Iskandariah was appointed as President of the Women's Institute of Pahang, the first women's organisation established in the country. She led the association onto the world stage and registered to the Associated Country Women of the World (ACWW), United Nations with 10 million members from 70 countries worldwide. As the Regional President and Deputy President of the Associated Country Women of the World, United Nations, she has attended five conferences in Tasmania, Australia; Arkansas, United States; Finland; India; United Kingdom; and in Southeast Asia and the Far East region. She was also nominated as candidate for the post of President of the Associated Country Women of the World, but had to withdraw from the election in April 2019 in Melbourne, Australia due to present commitments and responsibilities.

She established the Tunku Azizah Fertility Foundation (TAFF) in 2004 to help women with problems in conceiving children. As many as 493 couples have received fertility treatments that are fully sponsored by the foundation and 115 babies were delivered from these procedures.

== Titles, styles and honours ==
Styles of Tunku Azizah Aminah Maimunah Iskandariah
- Reference style: Her Royal Highness
- Spoken style: Your Royal Highness
- Alternative style: Tuanku

As a Tengku Ampuan of Pahang, Tunku Azizah Aminah Maimunah Iskandariah's full style and title in Malay: Kebawah Duli Paduka Baginda Tengku Ampuan Pahang Tunku Azizah Aminah Maimunah Iskandariah binti Almarhum Sultan Iskandar Al-Haj, D.K., D.M.N., S.A.A.S., S.S.A.P., S.I.M.P., D.K. (Johor), S.P.M.J., D.K. (Brunei), D.K. (Selangor)

in English: Her Royal Highness Tunku Azizah Aminah Maimunah Iskandariah binti Almarhum Sultan Iskandar Al-Haj, D.K., D.M.N., S.A.A.S., S.S.A.P., S.I.M.P., D.K. (Johor), S.P.M.J., D.K. (Brunei), D.K. (Selangor), Tengku Ampuan of Pahang

=== Honours of Pahang ===
- Member 1st class of the Family Order of the Crown of Indra of Pahang (DK I)
- Member 2nd class of the Family Order of the Crown of Indra of Pahang (DK II, 24 October 1989)
- Knight Grand Companion of the Order of Al-Sultan Abdullah of Pahang (SAAS) – Dato' Sri Setia (30 July 2024)
- Grand Knight of the Order of Sultan Ahmad Shah of Pahang (SSAP) – Dato' Sri
- Grand Knight of the Order of the Crown of Pahang (SIMP) – Dato' Indera
- Recipient of the Sultan Ahmad Shah Silver Jubilee Medal (1999)

=== Malaysia and its other states ===
- Malaysia
  - Recipient of the Order of the Crown of the Realm (DMN) (11 July 2019)
  - Recipient of the 16th Yang di-Pertuan Agong Installation Medal (30 July 2019)
  - Recipient of the 15th Yang di-Pertuan Agong Installation Medal (24 April 2017)
  - Recipient of the 14th Yang di-Pertuan Agong Installation Medal (11 April 2012)
  - Recipient of the 12th Yang di-Pertuan Agong Installation Medal (25 April 2002)
  - Recipient of the 10th Yang di-Pertuan Agong Installation Medal (22 September 1994)
  - Recipient of the 9th Yang di-Pertuan Agong Installation Medal (18 September 1989)
  - Recipient of the 8th Yang di-Pertuan Agong Installation Medal (15 November 1984)
- Johor
  - First Class of the Royal Family Order of Johor (DK I, 8 December 2023)
  - Second Class of the Royal Family Order of Johor (DK II, 15 April 1996)
  - Knight Grand Commander of the Order of the Crown of Johor (SPMJ) – Datin Paduka (1983)
  - Recipient of the Sultan Ibrahim Coronation Medal (23 March 2015)
- Selangor
  - First Class of the Royal Family Order of Selangor (DK I, 11 December 2023)
  - Recipient of the Sultan Sharafuddin Coronation Medal (8 March 2003)

=== Foreign ===
- Brunei
  - Recipient of the Family Order of Laila Utama (DK) - Dato Laila Utama (2019)

=== Honorary degrees ===
- Malaysia
  - Honorary Ph.D. degree in Creative Arts from Universiti Teknologi Mara (2024)
  - Honorary Ph.D. degree in Management from Multimedia University (2024)

Malaysian royalty
Preceded by Tengku Ampuan Afzan	Tengku Ampuan of Pahang (consort of Sultan of Pahang); 2019–present	Incumbent
Vacant Title last held by Tuanku Hajjah Haminah (Sultanah of Kedah)	Raja Permaisuri Agong (Queen of Malaysia); 2019–2024	Succeeded by Raja Zarith Sofiah (Permaisuri of Johor)
