= Tengku Amir Nasser Ibrahim Shah =

Tengku Amir Nasser Ibrahim Shah تنكو أمير ناصر إبراهيم شاه
- Tengku Panglima Raja
- Born: Tengku Amir Nasser Ibrahim Shah bin Tengku Ibrahim; 25 August 1986 (age 40); Kuantan, Pahang, Malaysia
- Spouse: Che Puan Panglima Raja Puteri Suraiya Afzan binti Mohamed Moiz
- Issue: Tengku Adam Ibrahim Shah; Tengku Sulaiman Abdullah Shah; Tengku Nuh Mohamed Shah
Names
- Tengku Amir Nasser Ibrahim Shah bin Almarhum Tengku Arif Bendahara Tengku Ibrahim
Regnal name
- Tengku Panglima Raja Tengku Amir Nasser Ibrahim Shah ibni Al-Sultan Abdullah Ri'ayatuddin Al-Mustafa Billah Shah
- House: Bendahara
- Father: Tengku Ibrahim Sultan Abu Bakar (biological); Al-Sultan Abdullah Ri’ayatuddin Al-Mustafa Billah Shah (adoptive)
- Mother: Czarina Raymond Abdullah (biological); Tunku Azizah Aminah Maimunah Iskandariah (adoptive)
- Religion: Sunni Islam
- Education: SOAS University of London (MA); Oxford Brookes University (BBA); Royal Military Academy Sandhurst
- Military career
- Allegiance: Malaysia
- Branch: Malaysian Army
- Service years: 2010–present
- Rank: Brigadier General
- Unit: Territorial Army
- Commands: 505th Reserve Regiment TA

Tengku Amir Nasser Ibrahim Shah (born Tengku Amir Nasser Ibrahim Shah bin Tengku Ibrahim; 25 August 1986) is a member of the Pahang royal family. He was officially granted the non-hereditary royal title Tengku Panglima Raja in 2019 by his adoptive father, Al-Sultan Abdullah of Pahang. He is the tenth child of Tengku Ibrahim Sultan Abu Bakar and the grandson of Sultan Abu Bakar of Pahang. (Note: In Malay nobility, the prefix Tengku, along with its variations such as Tunku and Tengku, can be translated as "Royal Prince" or "Royal Princess" because Malay, like many Asian languages, uses gender-neutral nouns. As a formal title, it is equivalent to "Prince" or "Princess" in English. For example, Tengku Amir Nasser may be referred to as Prince Amir Nasser in English-speaking contexts.)

Following the death of his father when he was one year old, he was adopted by his first cousin, Al-Sultan Abdullah, and his wife, Tunku Azizah Aminah Maimunah Iskandariah, the Tengku Ampuan of Pahang.

== Early life and education ==
Tengku Amir Nasser Ibrahim Shah was born as Tengku Amir Nasser Ibrahim Shah bin Tengku Ibrahim on 25 August 1986 in Kuantan, Pahang. He is the tenth child of Tengku Ibrahim bin Tengku Abu Bakar, the Tengku Arif Bendahara of Pahang, from his third wife, Czarina Raymond Abdullah. His father died on 31 May 1987, when Tengku Amir was one year old. Following this, the newlywed royal couple and his first cousin, Tengku Abdullah and Tunku Azizah Aminah Maimunah Iskandariah, adopted him as their son.

Tengku Amir spent his childhood between Pahang and Kuala Lumpur and received his early education at the Alice Smith School in Kuala Lumpur. In 2005, he enrolled at Oxford Brookes University, where he obtained a Bachelor's degree in Business, majoring in Marketing and Management, graduating in 2008.

Following his undergraduate studies, he entered the Commissioning Course at the Royal Military Academy Sandhurst as part of Intake 083 and was commissioned as a second lieutenant in 2009.

In 2010, he pursued postgraduate studies at the School of Oriental and African Studies (SOAS), University of London, where he earned a Master's degree in Islamic Societies and Cultures.

== Military career ==
Tengku Amir Nasser Ibrahim Shah underwent military training at the Royal Military Academy Sandhurst in the United Kingdom in 2008 and was commissioned as a second lieutenant by Queen Elizabeth II in 2009. Upon returning to Malaysia, he enlisted in the Territorial Army in September 2010 and began serving actively as a reservist.

On 21 January 2020, he was promoted to the rank of lieutenant colonel and appointed Deputy Commander of the 505th Reserve Regiment, Territorial Army. He was subsequently promoted to colonel on 7 April 2022 and appointed Acting Commander of the regiment, representing his adoptive father, Al-Sultan Abdullah, who had taken on broader ceremonial responsibilities as Commodore-in-Chief of the Royal Malaysian Air Force.

In recognition of his dedication and strong support for the Territorial Army, Tengku Amir was promoted to the rank of brigadier general on 27 October 2023 and assumed the role of Commander of the 505th Reserve Regiment.

== Titles, styles, orders and recognitions ==
The full title and style of Tengku Amir Nasser is:

Yang Amat Mulia Tengku Panglima Raja Brigadier Jeneral Tengku Amir Nasser Ibrahim Shah Ibni Al-Sultan Abdullah Ri'ayatuddin Al Mustafa Billah Shah, S.S.A.P., S.I.M.P.

يڠ امت مليا تڠكو ڤڠليما راج بريڬاديار جنيرال تڠكو أمير ناصر إبراهيم شاه ابن السلطان عبدالله ريءاياتالدينالمصطفى بيلله شه

(His Highness Tengku Panglima Raja Brigadier General Prince Amir Nasser Ibrahim Shah Ibni Al-Sultan Abdullah Ri'ayatuddin Al Mustafa Billah Shah SSAP, SIMP)

=== Tengku Panglima Raja ===
On 15 August 2019, following the accession of his adoptive father, Al-Sultan Abdullah Ri'ayatuddin Al-Mustafa Billah Shah, as the Sultan of Pahang, Tengku Amir Nasser Ibrahim Shah was conferred the non-hereditary title Tengku Panglima Raja (تڠكو ڤڠليما راج). As a result, his spouse bears the title Panglima Puteri. This title is a component of the traditional Malay nobility within the Peerage of Pahang and is regarded as one of the most prestigious positions in the state's royal hierarchy.

In accordance with Malay royal and noble customs, such titles serve as prefixes rather than suffixes, in contrast to the European style. As such, Tengku Panglima Raja precedes his name. This title is held for life, unless it is elevated or revoked at the discretion of the reigning Sultan of Pahang.

In official functions or ceremonial contexts, he may be addressed simply as His Highness Tengku Panglima Raja, without the need to mention his full title and style. (Note: Similar to British usage, certain titles and peerages are referred to without the full name. For example, Duke of Cambridge)

As Tengku Panglima Raja, he also serves as Deputy President of the Pahang Council of Islamic Religion and Malay Customs (Malay: Majlis Ugama Islam dan Adat Resam Melayu Pahang, MUIP).

=== Honours of Pahang ===
- Grand Knight of the Order of Sultan Ahmad Shah of Pahang (SSAP) – Dato' Sri (2020)
- Grand Knight of the Order of the Crown of Pahang (SIMP) – Dato' Indera (2016)
- Recipient of the Sultan Ahmad Shah Silver Jubilee Medal (1999)

=== Honours of Malaysia ===
- Malaysia
  - Recipient of the General Service Medal (PPA)
  - Recipient of the 16th Yang di-Pertuan Agong Installation Medal (30 July 2019)
  - Recipient of the 17th Yang di-Pertuan Agong Installation Medal (20 July 2024)
- Kedah
  - Recipient of the Sultan Sallehuddin Installation Medal (22 October 2018)

=== Foreign honours ===
- United Kingdom
  - Recipient of the Sandhurst Medal

== Notes ==
Tengku Amir Nasser Ibrahim Shah House of Bendahara, Pahang Born: 25 August 1986
Malaysian royalty
Lines of succession
Preceded by none	Tengku Panglima Raja; 2019–present	Incumbent
