= Abdullah of Pahang =

King of Malaysia from 2019 to 2024

Abdullah
- Al-Mustafa Billah
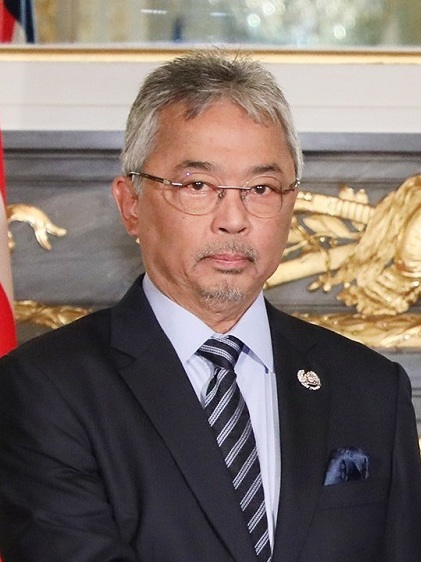
- Abdullah in 2019

King of Malaysia
- Reign: 31 January 2019 – 30 January 2024
- Installation: 30 July 2019
- Predecessor: Muhammad V
- Successor: Ibrahim Iskandar

Sultan of Pahang
- Reign: 11 January 2019 – present
- Proclamation: 15 January 2019
- Predecessor: Ahmad Shah
- Heir apparent: Tengku Hassanal Ibrahim Alam Shah
- Born: 30 July 1959 (age 67); Istana Mangga Tunggal, Pekan, Pahang, Federation of Malaya
- Spouse: Tunku Azizah Aminah Maimunah Iskandariah (m. 1986); Che Puan Julia Abdul Rais (m. 1991)
- Issue: Tengku Amir Nasser Ibrahim Shah (adopted); Tengku Ahmad Iskandar Shah (deceased); Tengku Hassanal Ibrahim Alam Shah; Tengku Muhammad Iskandar Ri'ayatuddin Shah; Tengku Ahmad Ismail Mu’adzam Shah; Tengku Puteri Iman Afzan; Tengku Puteri Ilisha Ameera; Tengku Puteri Ilyana Alia; Tengku Puteri Afzan Aminah Hafidzatullah; Tengku Puteri Jihan Azizah 'Athiyatullah
Names
- Tengku Abdullah ibni Tengku Ahmad Shah
Regnal name
- Al-Sultan Abdullah Ri'ayatuddin Al-Mustafa Billah Shah ibni Almarhum Sultan Haji Ahmad Shah (Note: The meaning of his regnal name is "Sultan Abdullah as the protector of Islam who is chosen by Allah".)
- House: Bendahara
- Father: Sultan Haji Ahmad Shah Al-Musta’in Billah ibni Almarhum Sultan Abu Bakar Ri’ayatuddin Al-Mu’azzam Shah
- Mother: Tengku Ampuan Hajah Afzan Rahimahallah binti Almarhum Tengku Panglima Perang Tengku Muhammad
- Religion: Sunni Islam
- Education: Royal Military Academy Sandhurst; Worcester College, Oxford; Queen Elizabeth College (Dip)
- Military career
- Allegiance: Malaysia
- Branch: Malaysian Army
- Service years: 1978–present
- Rank: Field marshal Admiral of the Fleet Marshal of the Air Force
- Units: Royal Armoured Corps; 505th Territorial Army Regiment

Abdullah of Pahang
Medal record

Polo

Representing Malaysia

SEA Games
Gold medal – first place	1983 Singapore	Men's tournament

Al-Sultan Abdullah Ri'ayatuddin Al-Mustafa Billah Shah ibni Almarhum Sultan Haji Ahmad Shah (Jawi: السلطان عبدﷲ رعاية الدين المصطفى بالله شاه ابن المرحوم سلطان حاج أحمد شاه;; born 30 July 1959) has been the sixth sultan of Pahang since ascending to the throne in 2019. He previously reigned as the King of Malaysia from 2019 until 2024.

Abdullah was born during the reign of his grandfather, Sultan Abu Bakar, and became heir apparent when his father, Sultan Ahmad Shah, acceded to the throne of Pahang in 1974. He was created Crown Prince of Pahang on 1 July 1975. He was educated at Royal Military Academy Sandhurst and later pursued a Diploma in International Relations and Diplomacy at Worcester College, Oxford and Queen Elizabeth College in 1980 until 1981. In 1986, he married Tunku Azizah Aminah. They had 10 children, notably Hassanal Ibrahim, Muhammad Iskandar and Puteri Iman Afzan, including one adopted son, Amir Nasser.

Abdullah became Sultan of Pahang upon his father's abdication in January 2019 who later died in May 2019.

On 31 January 2019, Abdullah was sworn in as the 16th king of Malaysia from 2019 to 2024. Abdullah played a prominent role in domestic politics, particularly during the 2020–2022 Malaysian political crisis and the intricate negotiations that followed the 2022 general election, which resulted in a hung parliament. As a result of this, his reign saw the most prime ministers of any monarch in Malaysia.

== Early life and education ==
Abdullah, born as Tengku Abdullah ibni Tengku Ahmad Shah on 30 July 1959, at the Istana Mangga Tunggal in Pekan, Pahang. He is the eldest son of Sultan Ahmad Shah of Pahang and Tengku Ampuan Afzan and is the fourth child among eight siblings, with his eldest sibling being Tengku Meriam.

Abdullah's early education began in 1965 at Clifford School in Kuala Lipis. He continued his primary education at Sekolah Kebangsaan Ahmad in Pekan from 1966 to 1969, followed by St. Thomas Primary School. For his secondary education, he attended St. Thomas Secondary School from 1970 to 1974, both of which are in Kuantan.

In pursuit of further education, Abdullah attended Aldenham School in Elstree, Hertfordshire, UK, from 1975 to 1977. Subsequently, he enrolled at the Royal Military Academy Sandhurst in the UK, where he studied from 1978 to 1979. He also pursued higher education at Worcester College, Oxford, and Queen Elizabeth College, United Kingdom from 1980 to 1981, graduating with a Diploma in International Relations and Diplomacy.

=== Military career ===
Abdullah embarked on his military career at the Royal Military Academy Sandhurst in 1978, where he initially served as an officer cadet. During his time at Sandhurst, he formed friendships with several individuals, including Sheikh Mohamed bin Zayed Al Nahyan, who would later become the President of the United Arab Emirates and Ruler of Abu Dhabi, as well as Zulkiple Kassim, who was his senior and later became the Chief of Army.

In 1979, Abdullah was commissioned as a second lieutenant by Queen Elizabeth II. His service led to his promotion to the rank of captain in 1980, where he served as a cavalry officer in the Royal Armoured Corps.

In 1987, Abdullah achieved the rank of major within the Royal Armoured Corps. Later, he was appointed captain of the Malaysian Royal Cavalry Corps and on 1 May 1999, he was assigned to the 505 Territorial Army Regiment. During the same period, he received a promotion to the rank of lieutenant colonel of the 505 Territorial Army Regiment. On 1 June 2000, he further advanced in rank to colonel of the 505 Territorial Army Regiment.

Abdullah's dedication to his military career saw him rise to the rank of brigadier general of the 505 Territorial Army Regiment on 1 April 2004, marking a significant milestone in his military service.

== Heir apparent (1975–2019) ==
Abdullah assumed the role of Tengku Mahkota of Pahang (crown prince of Pahang), on 1 July 1975. His formal installation took place on 23 October 1977, at the Istana Abu Bakar in Pekan.

Additionally, Abdullah was appointed as the Regent of Pahang on two occasions. The first appointment occurred when his father was elected as the seventh Yang di-Pertuan Agong. During this period, he served as Regent for a duration of five years, starting on 26 April 1979, and concluding on 25 April 1984.

The second time Abdullah assumed the role of regent was in 2016 when his father's health began to deteriorate. He served as regent once again from 28 December 2016, until his ascension to the throne in 2019.

== Sultan of Pahang (2019–present) ==
On 15 January 2019, at the age of 59, Abdullah was officially proclaimed as the sixth sultan of modern Pahang. This proclamation came about due to his father's abdication from the throne, which was prompted by his ill health. The ceremony marking Abdullah's ascension to the throne was held at the Istana Abu Bakar, the official residence of the sultan. His reign was retroactively declared to have commenced on 11 January 2019, the day the Regency Council decided on his succession.

Upon becoming the Sultan of Pahang, Abdullah adopted the regnal title "Al-Sultan Abdullah Ri'ayatuddin Al-Mustafa Billah Shah ibni Sultan Haji Ahmad Shah Al-Musta'in Billah."

Furthermore, his royal consort, Tunku Azizah Aminah Maimunah Iskandariah, who held the title of Tengku Puan of Pahang (crown princess), was proclaimed as the Tengku Ampuan (Queen consort) of Pahang on 29 January 2019.

As per his duties as Sultan of Pahang, he serves currently as Chancellor of University of Kuala Lumpur (UniKL), and Universiti Malaysia Pahang Al-Sultan Abdullah (UMPSA).

== King of Malaysia (2019–2024) ==
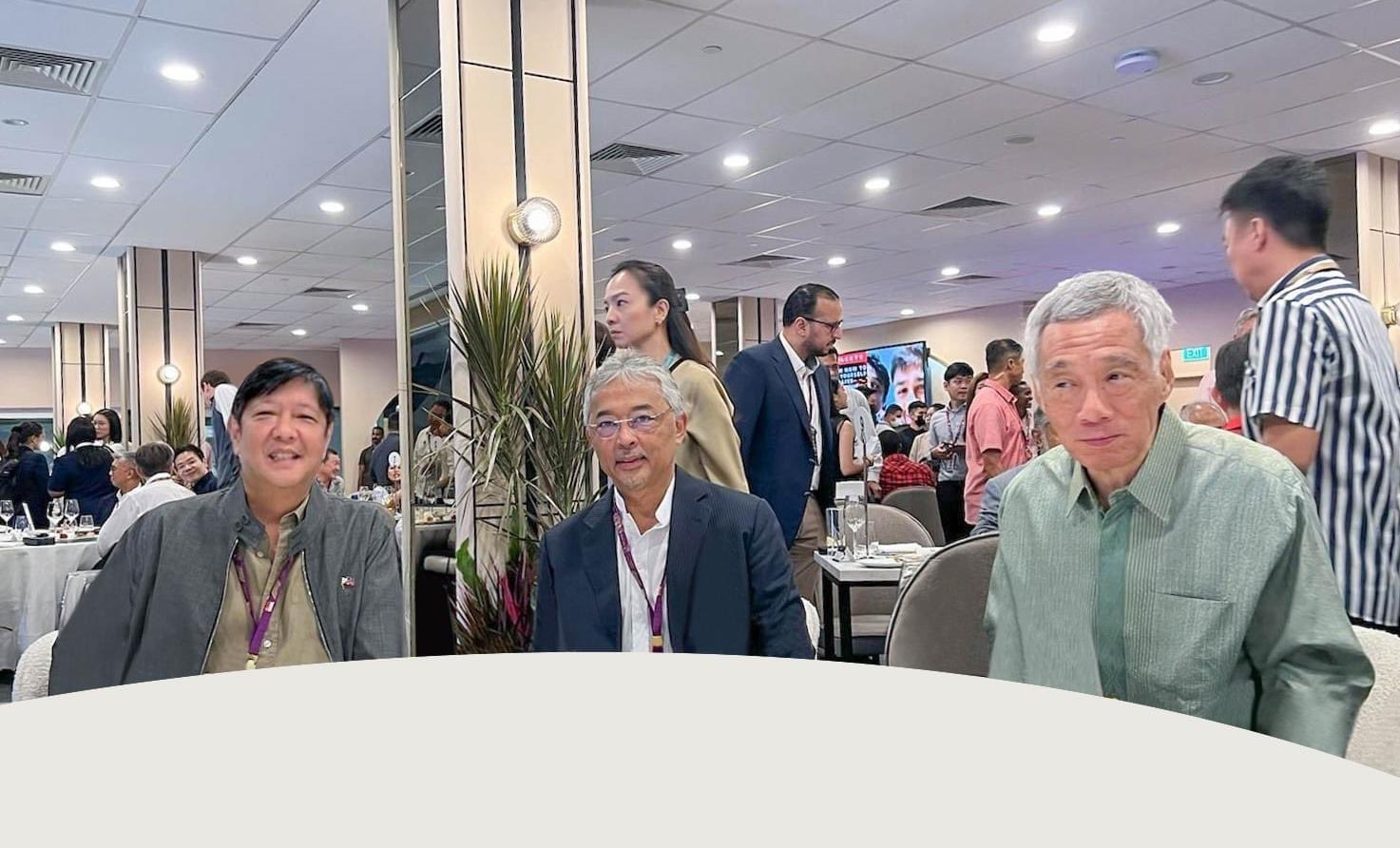
Abdullah (center) with Philippine President Bongbong Marcos (left) and Singapore Prime Minister Lee Hsien Loong (right) at the 2022 Singapore Grand Prix

On 24 January 2019, the Conference of Rulers elected Abdullah as the 16th Yang di-Pertuan Agong (King of Malaysia), replacing Sultan Muhammad V of Kelantan, who had abdicated a few weeks earlier. Abdullah was officially sworn in on 31 January 2019, in a public ceremony, taking up residence at the Istana Negara, Jalan Tuanku Abdul Halim. During this time, the Conference of Rulers also elected Sultan Nazrin Muizzuddin Shah of Perak as the Deputy Yang di-Pertuan Agong. Abdullah became the second Yang di-Pertuan Agong to reign while his father was still alive and the only one whose father was a former Yang di-Pertuan Agong.

Whilst Abdullah was the Yang di-Pertuan Agong the responsibility of ruling the Pahang was handed to Abdullah's son, Tengku Hassanal Ibrahim Alam Shah, who was proclaimed as the Tengku Mahkota of Pahang and Regent of Pahang on 29 January 2019. At the time of his appointment, Hassanal was still pursuing his studies at the Royal Military Academy Sandhurst in the United Kingdom. He was assisted in carrying out his duties by Majlis Jumaah Pangkuan Diraja Negeri Pahang (Pahang Council of Regency) led by Abdullah's eldest younger brother, Tengku Abdul Rahman, from 15 February 2019, until Hassanal's graduation on 15 December 2019.

Abdullah's ceremonial installation as Yang di-Pertuan Agong took place at the Throne Hall of the Istana Negara on 30 July 2019, seven months after his assumption of the throne, which coincided with his 60th birthday. This installation was historically significant because both Abdullah and the Raja Permaisuri Agong (Queen of Malaysia), Tunku Azizah, are the children of sultans who had previously been elected as the Yang di-Pertuan Agong.

In his role as the Yang di-Pertuan Agong, Abdullah held the rank of marshal of the Royal Malaysian Air Force, which was part of his constitutional duties as the Commander-in-Chief of the Malaysian Armed Forces. He also held the ranks of field marshal of the Malaysian Army and Admiral of the Fleet of the Royal Malaysian Navy. Additionally, he served as the colonel-in-chief of the Royal Malaysian Air Force.

Abdullah also held the position of Chancellor of Universiti Teknologi MARA (UiTM) and National Defence University of Malaysia (UPNM) during his term as the Yang di-Pertuan Agong.

Abdullah's reign as Yang di-Pertuan Agong coincided with a politically challenging period in Malaysian history. During this time, there were significant political changes and challenges, including the fall of the Pakatan Harapan (PH) administration and the appointment of a new prime minister. Abdullah played a crucial role in ensuring political stability during these times, including appointing Mahathir Mohamad as interim prime minister and later appointing Muhyiddin Yassin as the new prime minister.

On 25 October 2020, Abdullah rejected Muhyiddin's request to declare a state of emergency in response to a spike in COVID-19 cases throughout Malaysia.

However, on 12 January 2021, Abdullah issued a nationwide Proclamation of Emergency until 1 August 2021, to address the ongoing spread of COVID-19 and a political crisis involving Muhyiddin's government. This emergency suspended parliament and elections, allowing the Malaysian government to introduce laws without parliamentary scrutiny.

The decision on the government's handling of the COVID-19 pandemic and the suspension of parliament led to various public reactions, including protests and calls for political change.

On 16 August 2021, following a loss of majority support, Muhyiddin and his cabinet resigned, and Abdullah appointed Ismail Sabri Yaakob as the 9th Prime Minister of Malaysia.

On 10 October 2022, Abdullah approved Ismail Sabri's request to dissolve the Malaysian parliament, leading to Malaysia's 15th general election, which produced a hung parliament. Abdullah ultimately named Anwar Ibrahim as the prime minister, marking the fourth prime minister of his reign and making him the Yang di-Pertuan Agong who had the most prime ministers since independence. Sultan Abdullah is also the Yang di-Pertuan Agong who has appointed the most prime ministers since Malaysia's independence, with Anwar being the third consecutive prime minister appointed by Abdullah.

His tenure as Yang di-Pertuan Agong ended on 30 January 2024, with the Conference of Rulers during their 263rd (special) meeting on 27 October 2023, had elected the Sultan of Johor and his brother-in-law, Sultan Ibrahim Iskandar as his successor.

== Other activities ==
=== Sport career ===
Tengku Abdullah is active in sports. Amongst his favourite sports are polo, football and hockey. He participates in local as well as international tournaments. He led the Pahang Royal Polo team in an international tournament at the Windsor Polo Club, England. He has also participated in tournaments in Singapore, the Philippines, Brunei, Argentina, the United States, Spain, Belgium and Thailand. He won a gold medal at the 12th SEA Games Singapore in 1983.

He is a vice-president of the Asian Football Confederation (AFC) executive committee and president of the Asian Hockey Federation. He is also the Honorary Member of International Hockey Federation (FIH). Beyond his royal responsibilities, Abdullah was actively engaged in international sports governance, serving as a distinguished member of the FIFA Council from 2015 to 2019.

=== Military career ===
Malaysia

- Malaysian Army
  - 1978: Officer cadet
  - 1979: Leftenan Muda ('Second lieutenant') (short service commission)
  - 1979: Leftenan ('Lieutenant')
  - 1980: Kapten ('Captain'), The Royal Armoured Corps
  - 1987: Mejar ('Major'), The Royal Armoured Corps
  - 1999: Leftenan Kolonel ('Lieutenant colonel'), The 505th Territorial Army Regiment
  - 2000: Kolonel ('Colonel'), The 505th Territorial Army Regiment
  - 2004: Brigedier Jeneral ('Brigadier general'), The 505th Territorial Army Regiment
- Royal Malaysian Air Force
  - 2019: Kolonel Yang Di-Pertua ('Colonel-in-chief'), Royal Malaysian Air Force
- Malaysian Armed Forces
  - 2019–2024: Pemerintah Tertinggi ('Commander-in-Chief'), Malaysian Armed Forces

== Personal life ==
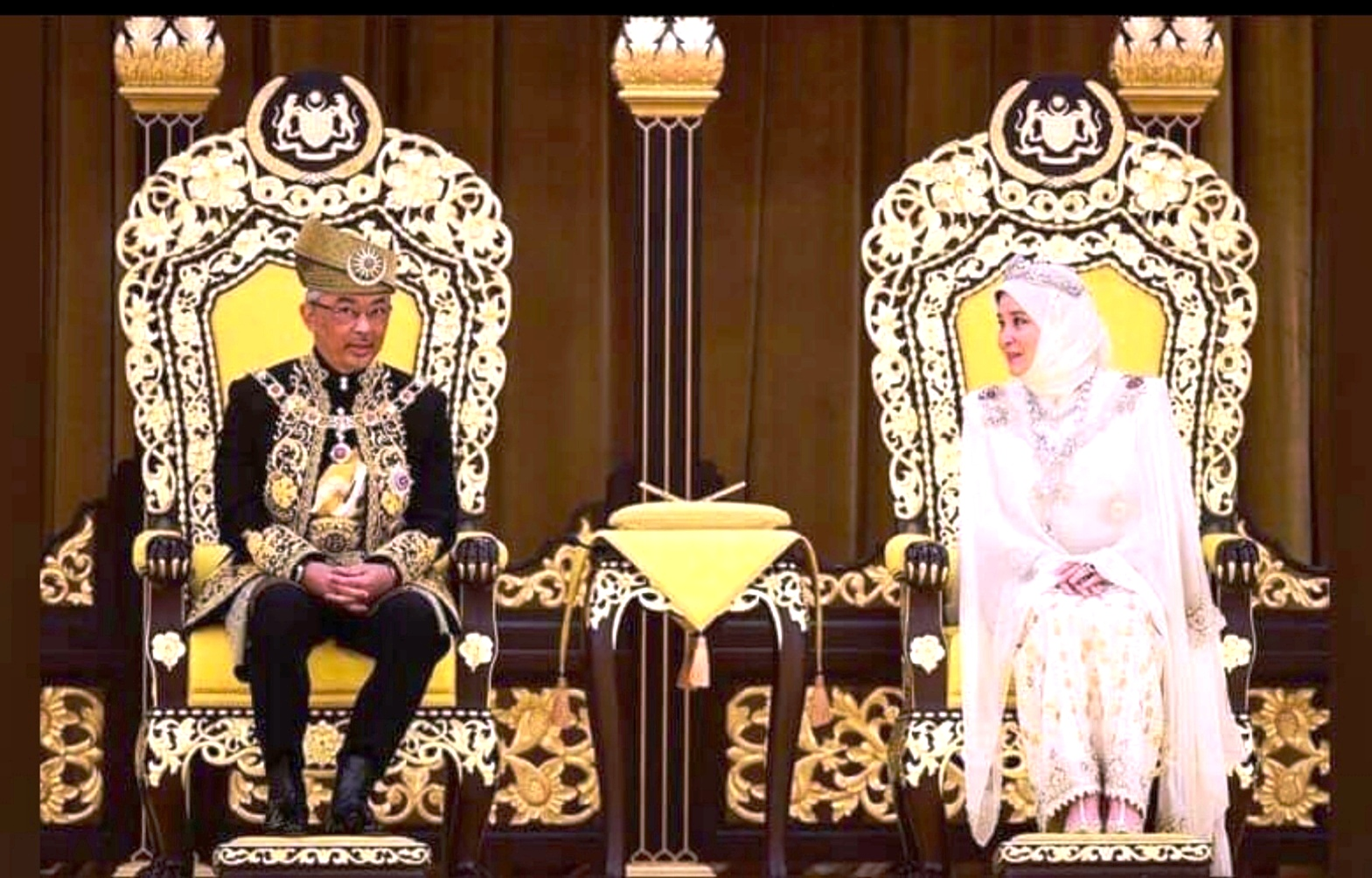
Abdullah and his consort, Tunku Azizah during their installation in 2019

His first marriage was to Tunku Azizah Aminah Maimunah Iskandariah binti Almarhum Al-Mutawakkil Alallah Sultan Iskandar Al-Haj, at the Sultan Abu Bakar State Mosque, Johor Bahru, on 6 March 1986. She is the third daughter of Sultan Iskandar of Johor by his first wife, Enche' Besar Khalsom binti Abdullah (née Josephine Ruby Trevorrow). Tunku Azizah has now thus been titled Tengku Ampuan of Pahang (Queen consort of Pahang). She is the younger sister of the current Sultan of Johor, Sultan Ibrahim ibni Almarhum Sultan Iskandar. They have four sons and two daughters together.

His second marriage was to Che Puan Julia Abdul Rais (born at Kota Bharu, Kelantan), 19 February 1971 (age 55), a former actress and daughter of Abdul Rais, in a private ceremony at Fraser's Hill in 1991. They have three daughters together.

Abdullah also adopted a son before the birth of his own:

- Tengku Amir Nasser Ibrahim Shah bin Almarhum Tengku Arif Bendahara Tengku Ibrahim, the Tengku Panglima Raja (shortly Tengku Amir), adopted in 1987. He was born on 25 August 1986 (age 40) as the youngest son of the late Tengku Arif Bendahara Tengku Ibrahim and his third wife, Czarina binti Abdullah.

Tengku Amir Nasser Ibrahim Shah and Puteri Suraiya Afzan Binti Mohamed Moiz, the Che Puan Panglima married on 19 December 2013. The couple's first child, a son named Tengku Adam Ibrahim Shah was born on 27 December 2015. Their second child, a son named Tengku Sulaiman Abdullah Shah was born 25 June 2018. Their third child, a son named Tengku Nuh Muhammad Shah was born on 31 January 2022.

== Issue ==
=== Sons ===
- Tengku Ahmad Iskandar Shah, born and died on 24 July 1990 (aged 0), son of Tunku Azizah
- Tengku Hassanal Ibrahim Alam Shah, the Tengku Mahkota (Crown Prince) of Pahang, (Tengku Hassanal) born at Tengku Ampuan Afzan Hospital, Kuantan on 17 September 1995 (age 31), son of Tunku Azizah
- Tengku Muhammad Iskandar Ri'ayatuddin Shah, the Tengku Arif Bendahara (Tengku Muhammad), born on 3 August 1997 (age 29), son of Tunku Azizah. On 24 October 2024, he married Tengku Natasya Puteri binti Tengku Adnan. The couple's first child, a daughter named Tengku Nadine Amina Zahra, was born on 2 July 2026.
- Tengku Ahmad Ismail Muadzam Shah, the Tengku Panglima Perang (Tengku Ahmad), born on 11 September 2000 (age 26), twin with his sister Tengku Puteri Afzan, son of Tunku Azizah

=== Daughters ===
- Tengku Puteri Iman Afzan, daughter of Julia Abdul Rais (born on 11 November 1992 (age 33) at Pantai Hospital Kuala Lumpur. On 24 August 2018, she married Tengku Abu Bakar Ahmad Bin Almarhum Tengku Arif Bendahara Tengku Abdullah. The couple's first child, a son named Tengku Zayn Edin Shah, was born on 23 July 2019. The couple's second child, a daughter named Tengku Aleya Norlini, was born on 2 February 2022
- Tengku Puteri Ilisha Ameera, daughter of Julia Abdul Rais (born on 1 October 1995 (age 31) at Pantai Hospital Kuala Lumpur.
- Tengku Puteri Ilyana Alia, daughter of Julia Abdul Rais, (born on 20 April 1997 (age 29) at Gleneagles Hospital Kuala Lumpur. On 7 August 2026, she married Christopher Lionel Froggatt.
- Tengku Puteri Afzan Aminah Hafidzatullah (Tengku Afzan), born on 11 September 2000 (age 26), twin with her brother Tengku Ahmad, daughter of Tunku Azizah. On 22 August 2024, she married Fateh Idzham bin Fateh Iskandar.
- Tengku Puteri Jihan Azizah 'Athiyatullah (Tengku Jihan), born on 27 April 2002 (age 24), daughter of Tunku Azizah

== Titles, styles, orders and recognitions ==
Styles of Al-Sultan Abdullah Ri’ayatuddin Al-Mustafa Billah Shah
- Reference style: His Royal Highness
- Spoken style: Your Royal Highness
- Alternative style: Tuanku

The full title and style of Al-Sultan Abdullah is:

His Royal Highness Al-Sultan Abdullah Ri’ayatuddin Al-Mustafa Billah Shah ibni Almarhum Sultan Haji Ahmad Shah, D.K.P., D.K.M., D.K., D.M.N., S.A.A.S., S.S.A.P., S.I.M.P., D.K. (Terengganu)., D.K. (Johor)., S.P.M.J., D.K.M.B. (Brunei)., D.K. (Kedah)., D.K.(Perlis)., D.K. (Perak)., D.K. (Selangor)., D.K. (Kelantan)., Order of The State of The Republic of Turkiye, Grand Cross of the Order of Saint-Charles (Monaco), The Sultan and Sovereign Ruler of the State of Pahang Darul Makmur and all its Subjugated Colonies

=== Honours of Pahang ===
- Grand Master and Member of the Royal Family Order of Pahang (DKP, since 11 January 2019)
- Grand Master (since 11 January 2019) and Member 1st class of the Family Order of the Crown of Indra of Pahang (DK I, 23 October 1977)
- Founding Grand Master and Grand Knight of the Order of Sri Setia Al-Sultan Abdullah Ahmad Shah of Pahang (SAAS, since 30 July 2024)
- Grand Master of the Grand Royal Order of Sultan Ahmad Shah of Pahang (since 11 January 2019)
- Grand Master (since 11 January 2019) and Grand Knight of the Order of Sultan Ahmad Shah of Pahang (SSAP, 24 October 1977)
- Grand Master and Grand Knight of the Order of the Crown of Pahang (SIMP, since 11 January 2019)
- Recipient of the Sultan Ahmad Shah Installation Medal (8 May 1975)
- Recipient of the Sultan Ahmad Shah Silver Jubilee Medal (1999)

=== Malaysia and its other states ===
- Malaysia
  - Grand Master (31 January 2019 – 30 January 2024) and Recipient of the Order of the Royal Family of Malaysia (DKM, 11 July 2019)
  - Grand Master (31 January 2019 – 30 January 2024) and Recipient of the Order of the Crown of the Realm (DMN, 14 February 2019)
  - Grand Master of the Order of the Defender of the Realm (31 January 2019 – 30 January 2024)
  - Grand Master of the Order of Loyalty to the Crown of Malaysia (31 January 2019 – 30 January 2024)
  - Grand Master of the Order of Merit of Malaysia (31 January 2019 – 30 January 2024)
  - Grand Master of the Order of Meritorious Service (31 January 2019 – 30 January 2024)
  - Grand Master of the Order of Loyalty to the Royal Family of Malaysia (31 January 2019 – 30 January 2024)
  - Warrior of the Most Gallant Order of Military Service (PAT)
  - Recipient of the 16th Yang di-Pertuan Agong Installation Medal (30 July 2019)
  - Recipient of the 15th Yang di-Pertuan Agong Installation Medal (24 April 2017)
  - Recipient of the 14th Yang di-Pertuan Agong Installation Medal (11 April 2012)
  - Recipient of the 12th Yang di-Pertuan Agong Installation Medal (25 April 2002)
  - Recipient of the 10th Yang di-Pertuan Agong Installation Medal (22 September 1994)
  - Recipient of the 9th Yang di-Pertuan Agong Installation Medal (18 September 1989)
  - Recipient of the 8th Yang di-Pertuan Agong Installation Medal (15 November 1984)
  - Recipient of the 7th Yang di-Pertuan Agong Installation Medal (10 July 1980)
- Johor
  - First Class of the Royal Family Order of Johor (DK I, 8 December 2023)
  - Second Class of the Royal Family Order of Johor (DK II, 15 April 1996)
  - Knight Grand Commander of the Order of the Crown of Johor (SPMJ) – Dato'
- Kedah
  - Member of the Royal Family Order of Kedah (DK, 5 September 2019)
  - Recipient of the Sultan Sallehuddin Installation Medal (22 October 2018)
- Kelantan
  - Recipient of the Royal Family Order of Kelantan (DK, 20 December 2023)
  - Recipient of the Sultan Muhammad V Proclamation Medal (13 September 2010)
- Negeri Sembilan
  - Recipient of the Tuanku Muhriz Installation Medal (26 October 2009)
- Perak
  - Recipient of the Royal Family Order of Perak (DK, 28 November 2019)
  - Recipient of the Sultan Azlan Shah Installation Medal (9 December 1985)
  - Recipient of the Sultan Azlan Shah Silver Jubilee Medal (2009)
  - Recipient of the Sultan Nazrin Shah Installation Medal (6 May 2015)
- Perlis
  - Member of the Perlis Family Order of the Gallant Prince Syed Putra Jamalullail (DK, 28 October 2019)
  - Recipient of the Tuanku Syed Sirajuddin Jamalullail Installation Medal (7 May 2001)
- Selangor
  - First Class of the Royal Family Order of Selangor (DK I, 11 December 2020)
  - Recipient of the Sultan Sharafuddin Coronation Medal (8 March 2003)
  - Recipient of the Sultan Salahuddin Silver Jubilee Medal (1985)
- Terengganu
  - Member second class of the Family Order of Terengganu (DK II, 22 October 1977)
  - Recipient of the Sultan Mahmud Al-Muktafi Billah Shah Coronation Medal (21 March 1981)
  - Recipient of the Sultan Mizan Zainal Abidin Coronation Medal (4 March 1999)

=== Foreign honours ===
- Brunei
  - Recipient of Royal Family Order of the Crown of Brunei (DKMB, 19 August 2019)
  - Sultan of Brunei Golden Jubilee Medal (5 October 2017)
- Monaco
  - Knight Grand Cross of the Order of Saint-Charles (27 November 2023)
- Turkey
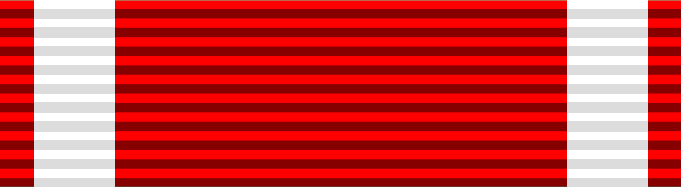
  - Collar of the Order of the State of Republic of Turkey (16 August 2022)
- United Kingdom
  - Recipient of the Sandhurst Medal

=== Honorary degrees ===
- Japan
  - Honorary Ph.D. from University of Tsukuba (2025)
- Malaysia
  - Honorary Ph.D. degree in Management from University Malaysia Pahang (2017)
  - Honorary Ph.D. degree in leadership from International Islamic University Malaysia (2023)
  - Honorary Ph.D. degree in Management from Multimedia University (2024)
- Turkey
  - Honorary Ph.D. degree in Political Science and International Relations from Marmara University (2022)

=== Places named after him ===
- Al-Sultan Abdullah Mosque in the Menara Merdeka 118 complex, Kuala Lumpur
- Universiti Malaysia Pahang Al-Sultan Abdullah (UMPSA) in Pekan, Pahang
- Universiti Al-Quran Al-Sultan Abdullah Ahmad Shah (UNIQSAAS) in Kuantan, Pahang
- Al-Sultan Abdullah Mosque in Telok Melano, Sarawak
- Al-Sultan Abdullah Ri'ayatuddin Al-Mustafa Billah Shah Mosque in Jengka, Pahang
- Hospital Al-Sultan Abdullah Universiti Teknologi MARA (UiTM) in Puncak Alam, Selangor
- Al-Sultan Abdullah Royal Tiger Reserve in Jerantut, Pahang
- Al-Sultan Abdullah Camp of the Joint Forces Headquarters in Kuantan, Pahang
- Al-Sultan Abdullah Foundation Hemodialysis Cantres in Cheras, Kuala Lumpur; Setiawangsa, Kuala Lumpur; Taman Melati, Kuala Lumpur; Pekan, Pahang and Jerantut, Pahang
- Al-Sultan Abdullah Mosque in Kampung Sungai Bedaun, Labuan
- Al-Sultan Abdullah Mosque in Masjid Tanah, Malacca
- Al-Sultan Abdullah Village of Hope in Pekan, Pahang
- Tengku Mahkota Abdullah Mosque in Kuantan, Pahang
- Tengku Mahkota Abdullah Mosque in Jerantut, Pahang
- Tengku Mahkota Abdullah Mosque in Rompin, Pahang
- Tengku Abdullah Al-Haj Mosque in Balok, Pahang
- Tengku Abdullah Hockey Stadium in Bangi, Selangor
- Tengku Abdullah Science School (SEMESTA Raub), a secondary school in Raub, Pahang

== Notes ==
Regnal titles
Preceded by Ahmad Shah	Sultan of Pahang; 11 January 2019 – present	Incumbent
Preceded by Muhammad V	Yang di-Pertuan Agong; 31 January 2019 – 30 January 2024	Succeeded by Ibrahim
