= List of Pahangese royal consorts =

Queen consorts to the Sultan of Pahang

Royal Consorts of Pahang
- State

Incumbent
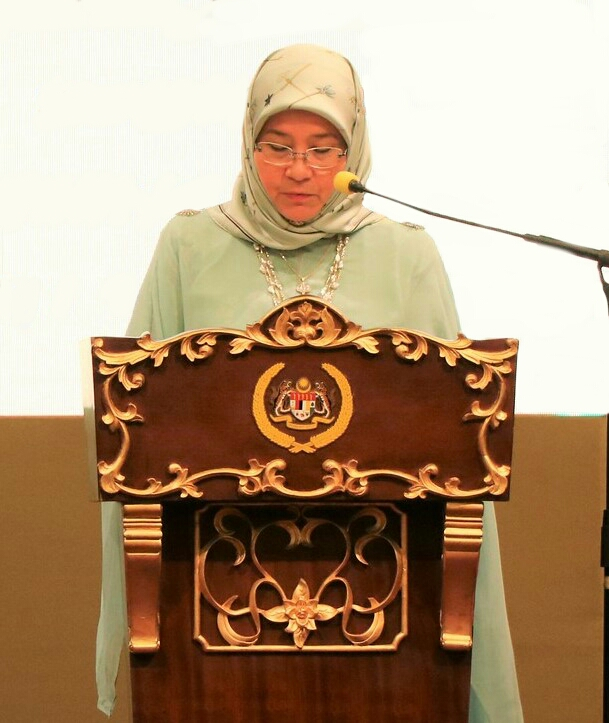
- Tengku Ampuan Azizah Aminah Maimunah Iskandariah since 22 January 2019

Details
- Style: Her Royal Highness
- Formed: 1909; 117 years ago
- Residences: Abu Bakar Palace, Pekan
- Appointer: Sultan of Pahang

Royal Consorts of Pahang are the consorts of Sultan of the Malaysian State of Pahang. Throughout the history of Sultanate of Pahang, several Sultans practiced polygamy, but per Islamic marital jurisprudence, they did not have more than four wives in the same time. However, this list only included those who given the official royal consorts title.

There are two official titles given to the royal consorts of Pahang based on their background identity. Tengku Ampuan of Pahang is the official royal consort title given to the consorts who come from a royal family. Meanwhile, Sultanah of Pahang is the royal title reserved for commoners.

== Royal consorts of Pahang ==
Name	Reign	Sultan	Notes
Tengku Ampuan Mariam binti Al-Marhum Sultan Abu Bakar	13 April 1909 – 19 June 1917	Sultan Mahmud Shah ibni Al-Marhum Sultan Ahmad Al-Mu'azzam Shah	The first Tengku Ampuan of Pahang
Sultanah Che Kalsum binti Tun Abdullah	19 June 1917 – 22 June 1932	Sultan Abdullah Al-Mu’tassim Billah Shah Ibni Al-Marhum Sultan Ahmad Al-Mu’azzam Shah	The first Sultanah of Pahang
Tengku Ampuan Fatimah binti Al-Marhum Sultan Iskandar Shah	22 June 1932 – 5 May 1974	Sultan Abu Bakar Ri’ayatuddin Al-Mu’azzam Shah Ibni Al-Marhum Sultan Abdullah Al-Mu’tassim Billah Shah	
Tengku Ampuan Afzan Rahimahallah binti Almarhum Tengku Panglima Perang Tengku Muhammad	8 May 1974 – 29 June 1988	Sultan Ahmad Shah Al-Musta’in Billah ibni Almarhum Sultan Abu Bakar Ri’ayatuddin Al-Mu’azzam Shah	Reigned as Raja Permaisuri Agong from 26 April 1979 – 25 April 1984
Sultanah Kalsom binti Abdullah	30 September 1992 – 11 January 2019	Sultan Ahmad Shah Al-Musta’in Billah ibni Almarhum Sultan Abu Bakar Ri’ayatuddin Al-Mu’azzam Shah	
Tengku Ampuan Azizah Aminah Maimunah Iskandariah binti Almarhum Al-Mutawakkil Alallah Sultan Iskandar Al-Haj	22 January 2019 – present	Al-Sultan Abdullah Ri'ayatuddin Al-Mustafa Billah Shah ibni Almarhum Sultan Haji Ahmad Shah Al-Musta'in Billah	Reigned as Raja Permaisuri Agong from 31 January 2019 – 30 January 2024

== Styles ==
Styles of Royal Consorts of Pahang
- Reference style: Her Royal Highness
- Spoken style: Your Royal Highness
- Alternative style: Tuanku

In English, both Tengku Ampuan and Sultanah of Pahang is styled as Her Royal Highness. In Malay, the Tengku Ampuan of Pahang formerly styled as Kebawah Duli Yang Maha Mulia until it was changed to Kebawah Duli Paduka Baginda since 14 March 2024, while the Sultanah of Pahang is styled as Duli Yang Maha Mulia.

== Roles and duties ==
Like many spouses of heads of state, the royal consorts of Pahang has no stipulated role or duties in the Pahang State Constitution. However, she accompanies the Sultan of Pahang to official functions and state visits, as well as hosting visiting heads of state and their spouses.

== See also ==
- Sultan of Pahang
- Yang di-Pertuan Agong
- Raja Permaisuri Agong
