= Tengku Ampuan Afzan Hospital =

Hospital in Kuantan, Pahang, Malaysia

Tengku Ampuan Afzan Hospital (HTAA)

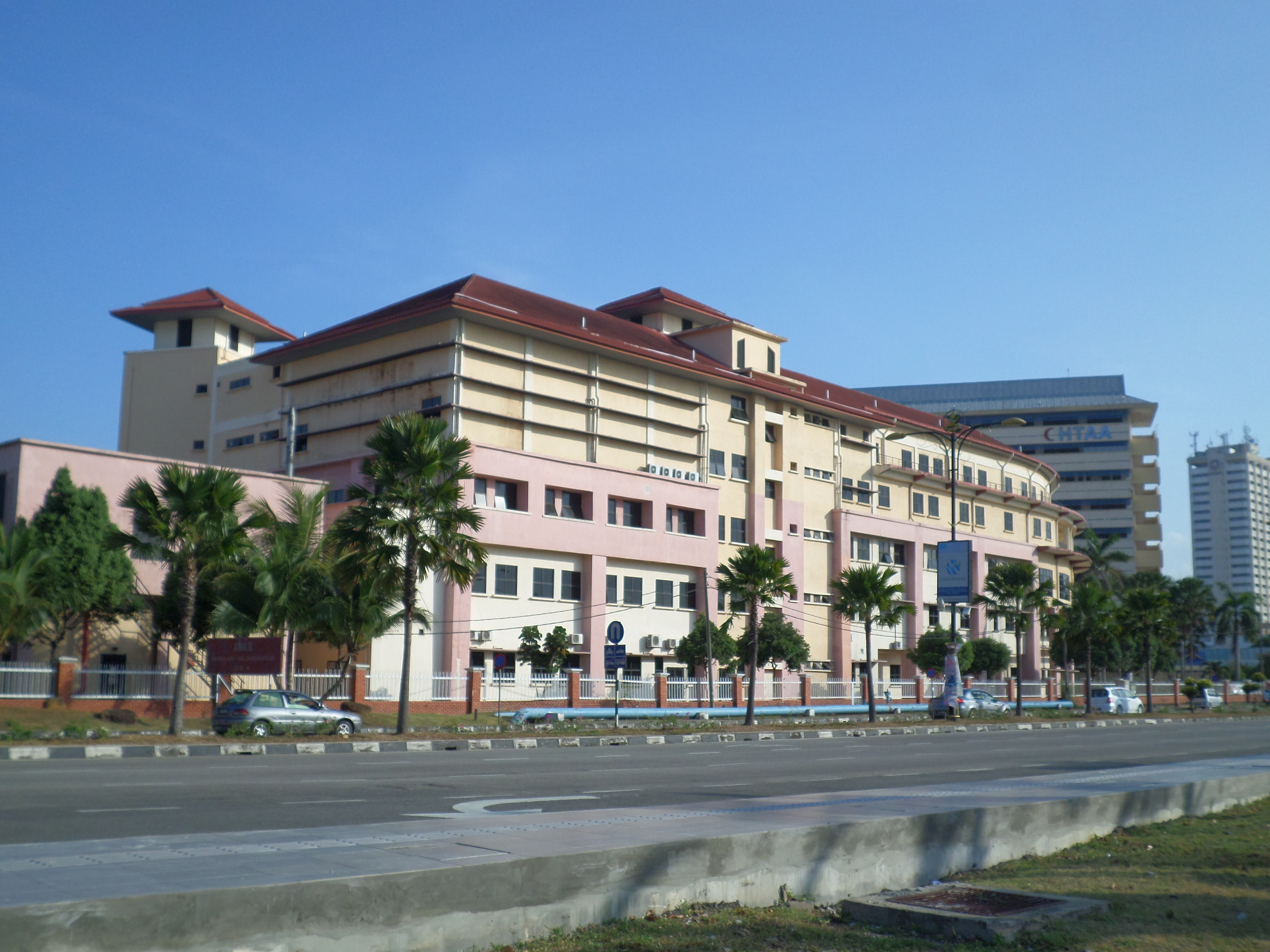

- Location within Pahang

Geography
- Location: Jalan Tanah Putih, Kuantan, Pahang, Malaysia
- Coordinates: 3°48′3.1566″N 103°19′18.4578″E

Organisation
- Type: District General

Services
- Emergency department: Yes
- Beds: 851

Links
- Website: htaa.moh.gov.my

Tengku Ampuan Afzan Hospital is a government funded district general hospital in Kuantan, Pahang, Malaysia. Tengku Ampuan Afzan Hospital opened in 1983. It had 851 beds.

== See also ==
- List of hospitals in Malaysia
