= Next Pahang state election =

General election for the 16th Pahang State Legislative Assembly

2028 Pahang state election
- On or before 17 February 2028

42 of 47 seats in the Pahang State Legislative AssemblyLegislative Assembly 27 seats needed for a majority
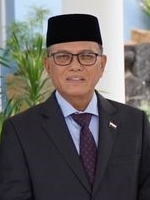

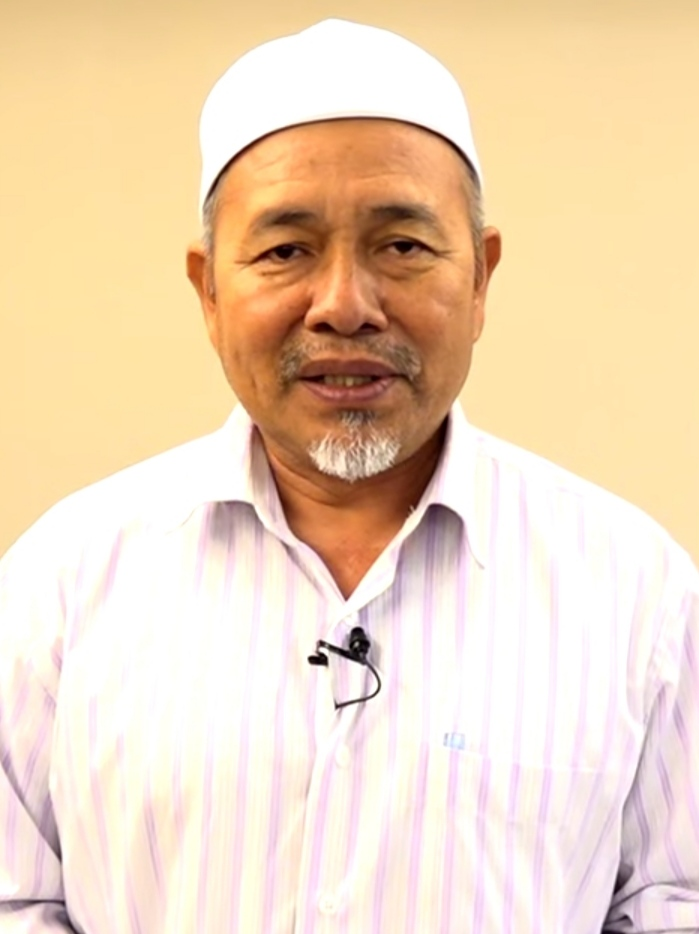
Leader	Wan Rosdy Wan Ismail	Ahmad Farhan Fauzi	Tuan Ibrahim Tuan Man
Party	United Malays National Organisation	People's Justice Party (Malaysia)	Malaysian Islamic Party
Alliance	Barisan Nasional	Pakatan Harapan	Perikatan Nasional
Leader since	15 May 2018	24 June 2026	28 October 2025
Leader's seat	Jelai	N/A	Cheka
Last election	17 seats, 38.47%	8 seats, 21.70%	17 seats, 39.00%
Current seats	17	8	17
Seats needed	▲10	▲19	▲10
Incumbent Menteri Besar
Wan Rosdy Wan Ismail
BN-PH coalition

The 2027 Pahang state election, will elect members of the 16th Pahang State Legislative Assembly.

It must be held on or before 27 February 2028, pursuant to clause 26(4) of the Constitution of Pahang or unless dissolved earlier by the Sultan of Pahang on the advice of the Menteri Besar of Pahang. All 42 seats in the Pahang State Legislative Assembly will be contested. The election will determine whether the incumbent Barisan Nasional government under Menteri Besar Wan Rosdy Wan Ismail retains power, or whether opposition coalitions such as Pakatan Harapan or Perikatan Nasional can secure a majority.

== Constituencies ==
Electoral map of Pahang, showing all 28 constituencies

== Composition before dissolution ==
BN			PH			IND	PN
19			10			1	17
17	1	1	6	3	1	1	15	2
UMNO	MIC	MCA	DAP	PKR	AMANAH	IND	PAS	BERSATU

== Background ==
=== Previous election ===
The previous state election was held on 19 November 2022 following the dissolution of the 15th State Legislative Assembly. The election resulted in a hung assembly with Perikatan Nasional emerging as the largest bloc, one seat ahead of the ruling Barisan Nasional coalition government.

On 27 November, one week after the election, it was announced that Wan Rosdy Wan Ismail would be reappointed as Menteri Besar at the head of a coalition government consisting of Barisan Nasional and Pakatan Harapan.

=== 2026: BERSATU joins BN-led state government ===
After PAS' official end of cooperation with BERSATU and disputes over its Perikatan Nasional membership, BERSATU started to act independently. Two assemblymen from BERSATU decided to support BN-led state government with approval from the party leadership on 26 August 2026.

== Electoral system ==
Elections in Malaysia are conducted at the federal and state levels. Federal elections elect members of the Dewan Rakyat, the lower house of Parliament, while state elections in each of the 13 states elect members of their respective state legislative assembly. As Malaysia follows the Westminster system of government, the head of government (Prime Minister at the federal level and the Menteri Besar/Chief Ministers/Premier at the state level) is the person who commands the confidence of the majority of members in the respective legislature – this is normally the leader of the party or coalition with the majority of seats in the legislature.

The Legislative Assembly currently consists of 42 members, known as Members of the Legislative Assembly (MLAs), that are elected for five-year terms. Each MLA is elected from a single-member constituencies using the first-past-the-post voting system; each constituency contains approximately an equal number of voters. If one party obtains a majority of seats, then that party is entitled to form the government, with its leader becoming the Premier. In the event of a hung parliament, where no single party obtains the majority of seats, the government may still form through a coalition or a confidence and supply agreement with other parties. In practice, coalitions and alliances in Malaysia, and by extension, in Sarawak, generally persist between elections, and member parties do not normally contest for the same seats.

The voting age is currently 18. Elections are conducted by the Election Commission of Malaysia, which is under the jurisdiction of the Prime Minister's Department. Malaysia practices automatic voter registration but does not practice compulsory voting.

== Preparations ==
=== Political parties ===
Barisan Nasional is expected to defend its governing mandate, while Pakatan Harapan aims to expend influence after the election. Perikatan Nasional may also expand its challenge in Malay-majority constituencies.

Seat negotiations among opposition parties are expected to play a major role in determining electoral competitiveness.

== Departing incumbents ==
The following members of the 15th Pahang State Legislative Assembly did not seek re-election.

No.	State Constituency	Departing MLA	Coalition (Party)	Date confirmed	First elected	Reason

== Candidates ==
Candidate announcements are expected closer to nomination day.

No.	Parliamentary constituency	No.	State Constituency	Number of Voters	Constituency Largest Ethnic	Incumbent Member	Incumbent Coalition (Party)	Political coalitions and respective candidates and coalitions									
No.	Parliamentary constituency	No.	State Constituency	Number of Voters	Constituency Largest Ethnic	Incumbent Member	Incumbent Coalition (Party)	Barisan Nasional (BN)		Pakatan Harapan (PH)		Perikatan Nasional (PN)		Others			
No.	Parliamentary constituency	No.	State Constituency	Number of Voters	Constituency Largest Ethnic	Incumbent Member	Incumbent Coalition (Party)	Candidate name	Party	Candidate name	Party	Candidate name	Party	Candidate name	Party	Candidate name	Party
P078	Cameron Highlands	N01	Tanah Rata		Chinese	Ho Chi Yang	PH (DAP)		MCA		DAP		GERAKAN				
P078	Cameron Highlands	N02	Jelai		Malay	Wan Rosdy Wan Ismail	BN (UMNO)		UMNO		PKR		WAWASAN				
P079	Lipis	N03	Padang Tengku		Malay	Mustapa Long	BN (UMNO)		UMNO		AMANAH		PAS				
P079	Lipis	N04	Cheka		Malay	Tuan Ibrahim Tuan Man	PN (PAS)		MCA		PKR		PAS				
P079	Lipis	N05	Benta		Malay	Mohd. Soffi Abd. Razak	BN (UMNO)		UMNO		PKR		WAWASAN				
P080	Raub	N06	Batu Talam		Malay	Abdul Aziz Mat Kiram	BN (UMNO)		UMNO		PKR		WAWASAN				
P080	Raub	N07	Tras		Chinese	Tengku Zulpuri Shah Raja Puji	PH (DAP)		MCA		DAP		GERAKAN				
P080	Raub	N08	Dong		Malay	Fadzli Mohamad Kamal	BN (UMNO)		UMNO		AMANAH		PAS				
P081	Jerantut	N09	Tahan		Malay	Mohd Zakhwan Ahmad Badarddin	PN (PAS)		UMNO		AMANAH		PAS				
P081	Jerantut	N10	Damak		Malay	Zuridan Mohd Daud	PN (PAS)		UMNO		PKR		PAS				
P081	Jerantut	N11	Pulau Tawar		Malay	Yohanis Ahmad	PN (PAS)		UMNO		AMANAH		PAS				
P082	Indera Mahkota	N12	Beserah		Malay	Andansura Rabu	PN (PAS)		UMNO		AMANAH		PAS				
P082	Indera Mahkota	N13	Semambu		Malay	Chan Chun Kuang	PH (PKR)		UMNO		PKR		PAS				
P083	Kuantan	N14	Teruntum		Chinese	Sim Chon Siang	PH (PKR)		MCA		PKR		GERAKAN				
P083	Kuantan	N15	Tanjung Lumpur		Malay	Rosli Abdul Jabar	PN (PAS)		UMNO		AMANAH		PAS				
P083	Kuantan	N16	Inderapura		Malay	Shafik Fauzan Sharif	BN (UMNO)		UMNO		PKR		PAS				
P084	Paya Besar	N17	Sungai Lembing		Malay	Mohamad Ayub Mat Ashri	PN (PAS)		UMNO		PKR		PAS				
P084	Paya Besar	N18	Lepar		Malay	Mohd Yazid Mohd Yunus	PN (BERSATU)		UMNO		AMANAH		WAWASAN				
P084	Paya Besar	N19	Panching		Malay	Mohd Tarmizi Yahaya	PN (PAS)		UMNO		PKR		PAS				
P085	Pekan	N20	Pulau Manis		Malay	Mohd Rafiq Khan Ahmad Khan	PN (PAS)		UMNO		DAP		PAS				
P085	Pekan	N21	Peramu Jaya		Malay	Mohamad Nizar Mohammad Najib	BN (UMNO)		UMNO		AMANAH		WAWASAN				
P085	Pekan	N22	Bebar		Malay	Mohd Fakhruddin Mohd Ariff	BN (UMNO)		UMNO		AMANAH		WAWASAN				
P085	Pekan	N23	Chini		Malay	Mohd Sharim Md Zain	BN (UMNO)		UMNO		PKR		PAS				
P086	Maran	N24	Luit		Malay	Mohd Sofian Abd Jalil	PN (PAS)		UMNO		PKR		PAS				
P086	Maran	N25	Kuala Sentul		Malay	Jasri Jamaluddin	PN (BERSATU)		UMNO		PKR		WAWASAN				
P086	Maran	N26	Chenor		Malay	Mujjibur Rahman Ishak	PN (PAS)		UMNO		AMANAH		PAS				
P087	Kuala Krau	N27	Jenderak		Malay	Rodzuan Zaaba	BN (UMNO)		UMNO		PKR		PAS				
P087	Kuala Krau	N28	Kerdau		Malay	Syed Ibrahim Syed Ahmad	BN (UMNO)		UMNO		AMANAH		WAWASAN				
P087	Kuala Krau	N29	Jengka		Malay	Shahril Azman Abd Halim	PN (PAS)		UMNO		AMANAH		PAS				
P088	Temerloh	N30	Mentakab		Malay	Woo Chee Wan	PH (DAP)		MCA		DAP		WAWASAN				
P088	Temerloh	N31	Lanchang		Malay	Hassan Omar	PN (PAS)		UMNO		PKR		PAS				
P088	Temerloh	N32	Kuala Semantan		Malay	Hassanuddin Salim	PN (PAS)		UMNO		AMANAH		PAS				
P089	Bentong	N33	Bilut		Chinese	Lee Chin Chen	PH (DAP)		MCA		DAP		GERAKAN				
P089	Bentong	N34	Ketari		Malay	Thomas Su Keong Siong	PH (DAP)		UMNO		DAP		GERAKAN				
P089	Bentong	N35	Sabai		Malay	Arumugam Verappa Pillai	BN (MIC)		MIC		DAP		WAWASAN				
P089	Bentong	N36	Pelangai		Malay	Amizar Abu Adam	BN (UMNO)		UMNO		AMANAH		PAS				
P090	Bera	N37	Guai		Malay	Sabariah Saidan	BN (UMNO)		UMNO		AMANAH		WAWASAN				
P090	Bera	N38	Triang		Chinese	Leong Yu Man	PH (DAP)		MCA		DAP		WAWASAN				
P090	Bera	N39	Kemayan		Malay	Khaizulnizam Mohamad Zuldin	BN (UMNO)		UMNO		PKR		PAS				
P091	Rompin	N40	Bukit Ibam		Malay	Nazri Ahmad	PN (PAS)		UMNO		PKR		PAS				
P091	Rompin	N41	Muadzam Shah		Malay	Razali Kassim	BN (UMNO)		UMNO		PKR		WAWASAN				
P091	Rompin	N42	Tioman		Malay	Mohd Johari Hussain	BN (UMNO)		UMNO		AMANAH		PAS				

== Opinion polls ==
Opinion polling has yet to intensify significantly ahead of the election.
