= Kuantan District =

- District of Pahang
- Daerah Kuantan
- Location of Kuantan District in Pahang
- Interactive map of Kuantan District
- Location of Kuantan District in Malaysia
- Coordinates: 3°55′N 103°5′E
- Country: Malaysia
- State: Pahang
- Seat: Kuantan
- Local area government(s): Kuantan City Council

Government
  - District officer: Zaliza Zulkipli

Area
  - Total: 2,960.42 km^{2} (1,143.02 sq mi)

Population (2010)
  - Total: 445,695
  - Density: 150.551/km^{2} (389.926/sq mi)
- Time zone: UTC+8 (MST)
  - Summer (DST): UTC+8 (Not observed)
- Postcode: 25xxx
- Calling code: +6-09
- Vehicle registration plates: C

The Kuantan District is a district in Pahang, Malaysia. Located in the north-east of Pahang, the district bordered Kemaman District of Terengganu on the north, South China Sea on the east, Jerantut District and Maran District on the west and Pekan District on the south.

The major towns in the district are Kuantan and Bandar Indera Mahkota. Panching, Sungai Lembing, Gambang and Beserah also located here.

== Administrative divisions ==
Map of Kuantan district.

Kuantan District is divided into 6 mukims, which are:

- Beserah
- Kuala Kuantan (downtown Kuantan)
- Penor
- Sungai Karang
- Ulu Kuantan
- Ulu Lepar

Additionally, the Gebeng industrial area is an autonomous sub-district (daerah kecil) within Kuantan district since 2020.

== Demographics ==
Historical population
Year	Pop.	±%
1991	255,974	—
2000	344,319	+34.5%
2010	443,796	+28.9%
2020	548,014	+23.5%

The following is based on Department of Statistics Malaysia 2010 census.

Ethnic groups in Kuantan District, 2010 census
Ethnicity	Population	Percentage
Bumiputera	60,696	67.2%
Chinese	24,511	27.1%
Indian	4,739	5.2%
Others	358	0.4%
Total	90,304	100%

== Education ==
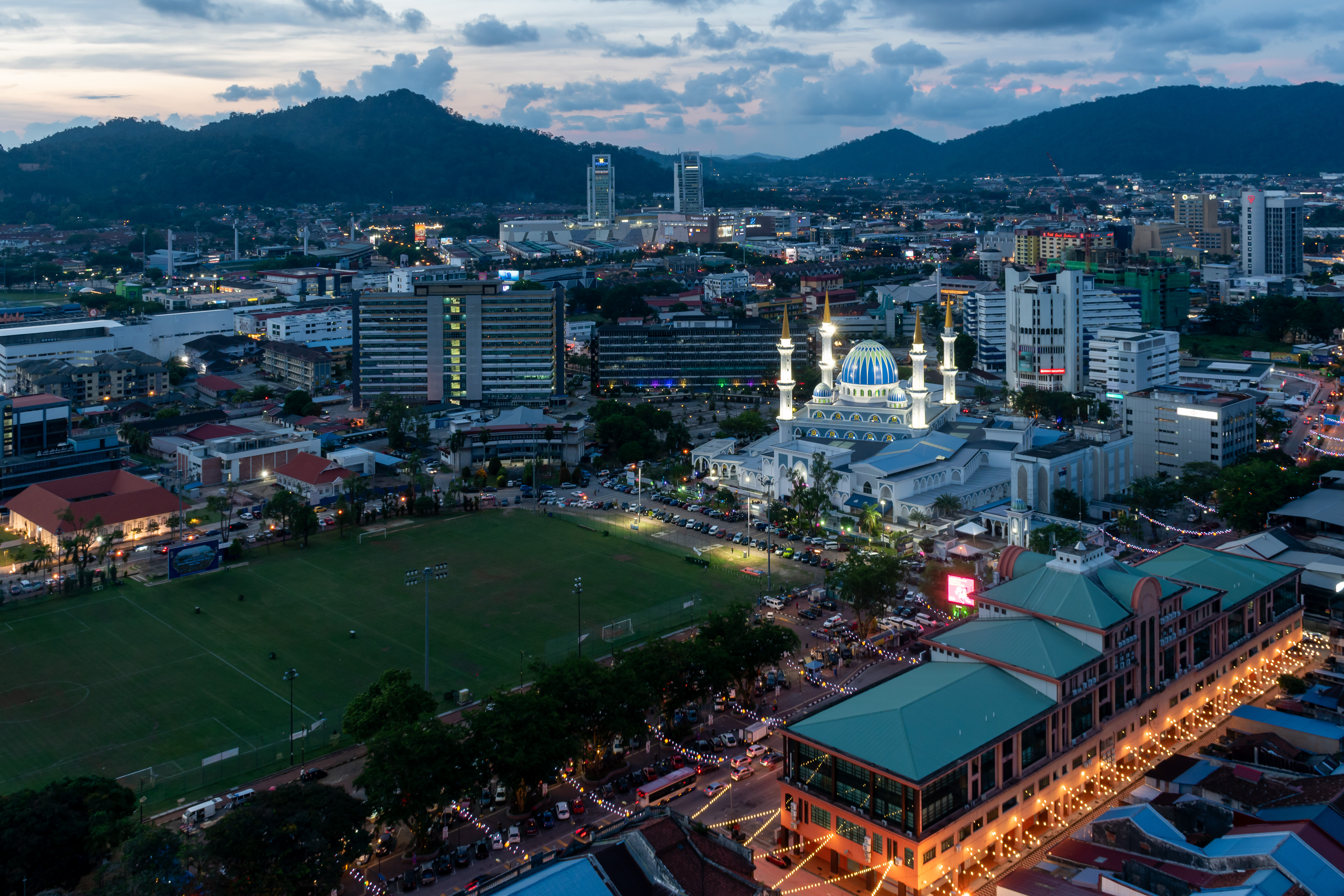
Aerial view of Kuantan.

=== Higher education ===
IPTA are institutes of higher learning run by the government. In Kuantan, they include:

- International Islamic University Malaysia (IIUM)
- University Malaysia Pahang
- Universiti Islam Pahang Sultan Haji Ahmad Shah (UnIPSAS)
- Politeknik Sultan Haji Ahmad Shah
- Kolej Komuniti Kuantan
- Kolej Matrikulasi Pahang (KMPh)

IPTS are institutes of higher learning run by private entities. In Kuantan, they include:

- Open University Malaysia (OUM)
- Widad University College
- Kolej Yayasan Pahang
- Kolej Poly-Tech MARA
- Kolej Matrikulasi Pahang (KMPh)
- Olympia College
- Institut ECMA
- Institut Latihan Perindustrian Kuantan (ILP Kuantan)
- Institut Teknologi MIDAS
- Institut Saga
- Kolej Kemahiran Tinggi MARA (KKTM)
- Kolej Komuniti Paya Besar, Gambang
- Kolej Professional Mara Indera Mahkota
- Kolej PSDC
- Kolej Teknologi Cosmopoint
- Malaysian Aviation Training Academy (MATA Aviation)
- DRB-HICOM of Automotive Malaysia (DRB-HICOM U)

== Federal Parliament and State Assembly Seats ==
List of Kuantan district representatives in the Federal Parliament (Dewan Rakyat)

Parliament	Seat Name	Member of Parliament	Party
P82	Indera Mahkota	Saifuddin Abdullah	Perikatan Nasional (BERSATU)
P83	Kuantan	Wan Razali Wan Nor	Perikatan Nasional (PAS)
P84	Paya Besar	Mohd Shahar Abdullah	Barisan Nasional (UMNO)
P85	Pekan	Sh Mohmed Puzi Sh Ali	Barisan Nasional (UMNO)

List of district representatives in the State Legislative Assembly (Dewan Undangan Negeri)

Parliament	State	Seat Name	State Assemblyman	Party
P182	N12	Beserah	Andansura Rabu	Perikatan Nasional (PAS)
P182	N13	Semambu	Chan Chun Kang	Pakatan Harapan (PKR)
P183	N14	Teruntum	Sim Chon Siang	Pakatan Harapan (PKR)
P183	N15	Tanjung Lumpur	Rosli Abdul Jabar	Perikatan Nasional (PAS)
P183	N16	Inderapura	Shafik Fauzan Sharif	Barisan Nasional (UMNO)
P184	N17	Sungai Lembing	Mohamad Ayob Asri	Perikatan Nasional (PAS)
P184	N18	Lepar	Mohd Yazid Mohd Yunus	Perikatan Nasional (BERSATU)
P184	N19	Panching	Mohd Tarmizi Yahaya	Perikatan Nasional (PAS)
P185	N20	Pulau Manis	Mohd Rafiq Khan Ahmad Khan	Perikatan Nasional (PAS)

== See also ==
- Districts of Malaysia
