= Mohamed Jaafar =

Malaysian politician

Yang Berbahagia Dato' Sri Mohamed Jaafar SSAP DIMP KMN
- محمد بن جعفر

Deputy Speaker of the Pahang State Legislative Assembly
- In office 1 July 2013 – 14 October 2022
- Monarchs: Ahmad Shah (2013–2019); Abdullah (2019–2022)
- Menteri Besar: Adnan Yaakob (2013–2018); Wan Rosdy Wan Ismail (2018–2022)
- Speaker: Ishak Muhamad
- Succeeded by: Lee Chin Chen
- Constituency: Jenderak

Member of the Pahang State Legislative Assembly for Jenderak
- In office 25 April 1995 – 19 November 2022
- Preceded by: Abdullah Kia (BN–UMNO)
- Succeeded by: Rodzuan Zaaba (BN–UMNO)
- Majority: 4,028 (1995); 1,975 (1999); 2,536 (2004); 1,374 (2008); 2,182 (2013); 1,713 (2018)

Faction represented in Pahang State Legislative Assembly
- 1995–2022: Barisan Nasional

Personal details
- Born: Mohamed bin Jaafar Pahang, Malaysia
- Citizenship: Malaysian
- Party: United Malays National Organisation (UMNO)
- Other political affiliations: Barisan Nasional (BN)
- Occupation: Politician

Mohamed bin Jaafar is a Malaysian politician who served as Deputy Speaker of the Pahang State Legislative Assembly from July 2013 to October 2022 and Member of the Pahang State Legislative Assembly (MLA) for Jenderak from April 1995 to November 2022. He is a member of the United Malays National Organisation (UMNO), a component party of the Barisan Nasional (BN) coalition.

== Election results ==
Pahang State Legislative Assembly
Year	Constituency	Candidate	Votes	Pct	Opponent(s)	Votes	Pct	Ballots cast	Majority	Turnout
1995	N25 Jenderak	Mohamed Jaafar (UMNO)	6,186	74.14%	Abdul Mukti Ismail (PAS)	2,158	25.86%	8,562	4,028	72.36%
1999	N25 Jenderak	Mohamed Jaafar (UMNO)	5,344	61.33%	Ahmad Nafiri Md Toazi (PAS)	3,369	38.67%	9,054	1,975	73.66%
2004	N27 Jenderak	Mohamed Jaafar (UMNO)	4,119	72.24%	Abu Samah Ali (PAS)	1,583	27.76%	5,861	2,536	75.64%
2008	N27 Jenderak	Mohamed Jaafar (UMNO)	3,745	61.23%	Suhaimi Said (PKR)	2,371	38.77%	6,318	1,374	77.63%
2013	N27 Jenderak	Mohamed Jaafar (UMNO)	5,047	63.04%	Suhaimi Said (PKR)	2,865	35.79%	8,228	2,182	84.90%
2013	N27 Jenderak	Mohamed Jaafar (UMNO)	5,047	63.04%	Parirud-din Muhamed Amin (IND)	94	1.17%	8,228	2,182	84.90%
2018	N27 Jenderak	Mohamed Jaafar (UMNO)	4,213	50.55%	Abdullah Yusoh (PAS)	2,500	29.99%	8,610	1,713	81.50%
2018	N27 Jenderak	Mohamed Jaafar (UMNO)	4,213	50.55%	Faizah Baharom (BERSATU)	1,622	19.46%	8,610	1,713	81.50%

== Honours ==
=== Honours of Malaysia ===
- Malaysia
  - Officer of the Order of the Defender of the Realm (KMN) (1999)
- Pahang
  - Knight Companion of the Order of the Crown of Pahang (DIMP) – Dato' (2000)
  - Grand Knight of the Order of Sultan Ahmad Shah of Pahang (SSAP) – Dato' Sri (2015)
