= 2022 Pahang state election =

Malaysian election

- 19 November 2022; 7 December (N42 Tioman)

All 42 elected seats of the Pahang State Legislative Assembly 22 seats needed for a majority
- Registered: 1,136,944
- Turnout: 77.47%
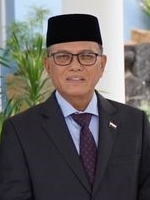

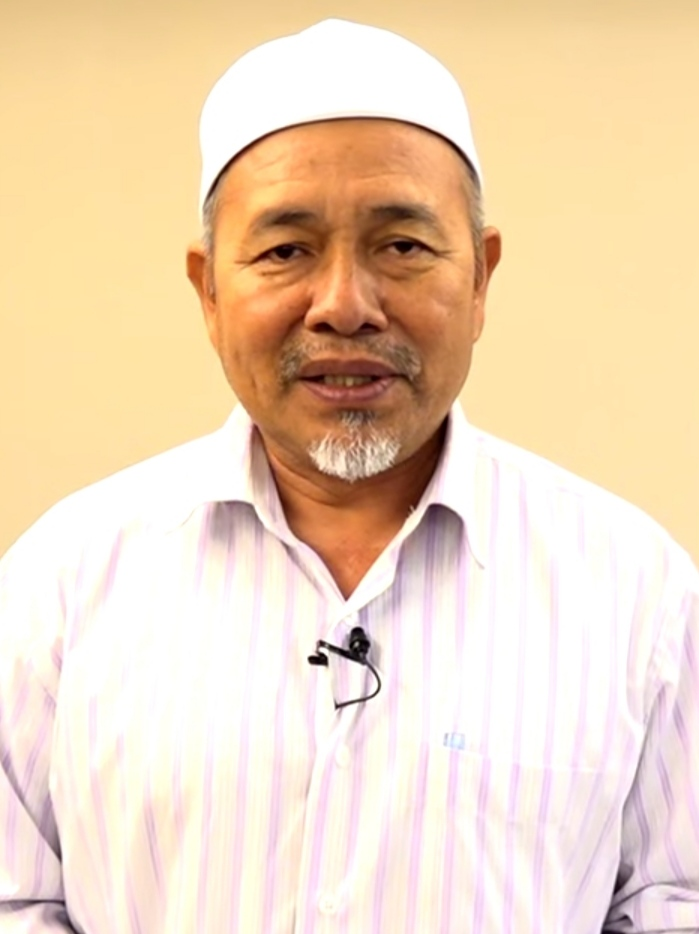

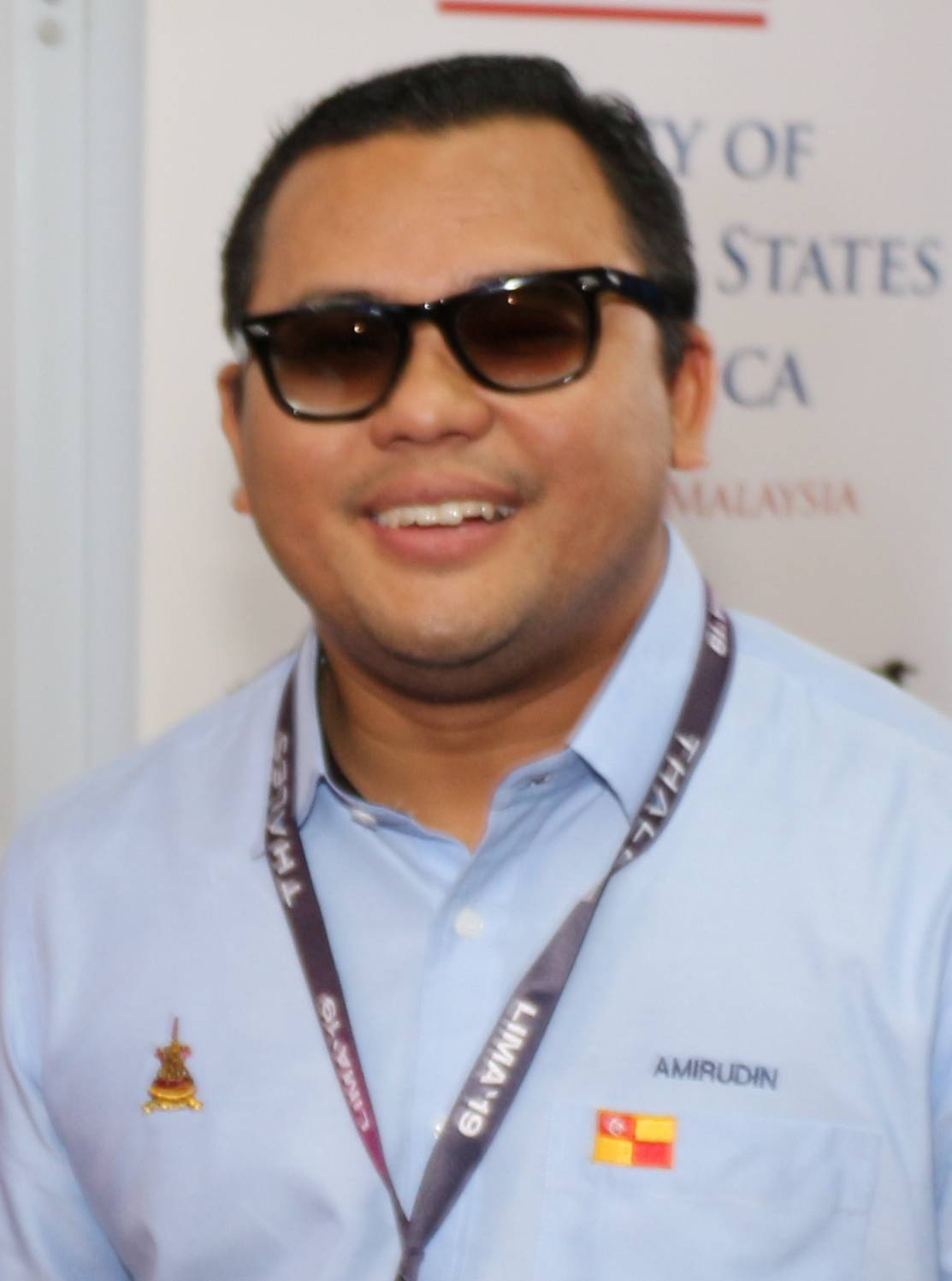
	Majority party	Minority party	Third party
Leader	Wan Rosdy Wan Ismail	Tuan Ibrahim Tuan Man	Amirudin Shari
Party	UMNO	PAS	PKR
Alliance	Barisan Nasional	Perikatan Nasional	Pakatan Harapan
Leader since	15 May 2018	2 November 2022	7 August 2022
Leader's seat	Jelai	Cheka	not contesting (Menteri Besar of Selangor and MLA for Sungai Tua, Selangor)
Last election	25 seats, 39.99% (Note: Total seats and vote share of the parties currently in Barisan Nasional (UMNO, MCA and MIC). The total seats and vote share of Barisan Nasional as it was in the last election was 25 seats and 39.99%, respectively.)	8 seats, 32.89% (Note: New coalition formed in 2020. These numbers are the total seats and vote share of BERSATU, PAS and GERAKAN in the last election. The parties were previously part of Pakatan Harapan, Gagasan Sejahtera and Barisan Nasional respectively.)	9 seats, 26.90% (Note: Excludes BERSATU, which was part of the coalition in the 2018 election but subsequently left and later joined Perikatan Nasional in 2020. The original number of seats and vote share held by Pakatan Harapan as it was in 2018 is 9 seats and 29.12%, respectively.)
Seats before	25	8	9
Seats won	17	17	8
Seat change	▼8	▲9	▼1
Popular vote	333,621	338,225	188,241
Percentage	38.47%	39.00%	21.70%
Swing	▼1.52 pp	▲6.11 pp	▼5.20 pp
Menteri Besar before election
Wan Rosdy Wan Ismail
BN–UMNO
Elected Menteri Besar
Wan Rosdy Wan Ismail
BN–PH coalition

The 2022 Pahang state election, formally the 15th Pahang state election, took place on 19 November 2022. This election was to elect 42 members of the 15th Pahang State Legislative Assembly. The previous assembly was dissolved on 14 October 2022. The election for the Tioman (state constituency) was delayed to 7 December following the death of the Perikatan candidate.

The election resulted in a hung parliament with Perikatan Nasional emerging as the largest bloc, one seat ahead of the ruling Barisan Nasional coalition government.

On 27 November, one week after the election, it was announced that Wan Rosdy Wan Ismail would be reappointed as Menteri Besar at the head of a coalition government consisting of Barisan Nasional and Pakatan Harapan.

== Constituencies ==
Map of constituencies to be contested

== Composition before dissolution ==
BN		PN	PH
25		8	9
24	1	8	7	2
UMNO	MCA	PAS	DAP	PKR

== Timeline ==
Dates	Events
14 October 2022	Dissolution of the Pahang State Legislative Assembly
20 October 2022	Issue of the Writ of Election
5 November 2022	Nomination day
5 - 18 November 2022	Campaigning period
15 - 18 November 2022	Early polling day for postal, overseas and advance voters
19 November 2022 (except N42 Tioman)	Polling day
N42 Tioman
19 November	Issue of the Writ of Election for N42 Tioman
24 November	Nomination day
24 November - 6 December	Campaigning period
3 - 6 December	Early polling day for postal, overseas and advance voters
7 December	Polling day

== Retiring incumbent ==
The following members of the 14th State Legislative Assembly retired.

No.	State Constituency	Departing MLA	Party	Date confirmed	First elected	Reason
N36	Pelangai	Adnan Yaakob	BN (UMNO)	12 October 2022	3 August 1986	Retired from politics
N01	Tanah Rata	Chiong Yoke Kong	PH (DAP)	1 November 2022	9 May 2018	Transferred to Cameron Highlands
N07	Tras	Chow Yu Hui	PH (DAP)	1 November 2022	9 May 2018	Transferred to Raub
N13	Semambu	Lee Chean Chung	PH (PKR)	19 October 2022	5 May 2013	Transferred to Petaling Jaya
N34	Ketari	Young Syefura Othman	PH (DAP)	1 November 2022	9 May 2018	Transferred to Bentong
N08	Dong	Shahiruddin Ab Moin	BN (UMNO)	2 November 2022	1995	Dropped by party
N17	Sungai Lembing	Md Sohaimi Mohamed Shah	BN (UMNO)	2 November 2022	1999	Dropped by party
N21	Peramu Jaya	Sh Mohamed Puzi Sh Ali	BN (UMNO)	2 November 2022	2013	Transferred to Pekan
N25	Kuala Sentul	Shahaniza Shamsuddin	BN (UMNO)	2 November 2022	2008	Transferred to Maran
N27	Jenderak	Mohamed Jaafar	BN (UMNO)	2 November 2022	1995	Dropped by party
N31	Lanchang	Mohd Sharkar Shamsudin	BN (UMNO)	2 November 2022	2008	Transferred to Temerloh
N37	Guai	Norol Azali Sulaiman	BN (UMNO)	2 November 2022	2008	Dropped by party
N39	Kemayan	Mohd Fadil Osman	BN (UMNO)	2 November 2022	2008	Dropped by party
N04	Cheka	Lee Ah Wong	BN (MCA)	4 November 2022	2018	Dropped by party

== Electoral candidates ==
The official list published on 5 November 2022 by Election Commission (SPR).

No.	Parliamentary Constituency	No.	State Constituency	Voters	Incumbent State Assemblymen	Coalition (Party)	Political coalitions and parties									
No.	Parliamentary Constituency	No.	State Constituency	Voters	Incumbent State Assemblymen	Coalition (Party)	Barisan Nasional		Pakatan Harapan		Perikatan Nasional		Gerakan Tanah Air (informal coalition)		Other parties/Independents	
No.	Parliamentary Constituency	No.	State Constituency	Voters	Incumbent State Assemblymen	Coalition (Party)	Candidate name	Party	Candidate name	Party	Candidate name	Party	Candidate name	Party	Candidate name	Party
P78	Cameron Highlands	N01	Tanah Rata	26,838	Chiong Yoke Kong	PH (DAP)	Wong Yap Wah	MCA	Ho Chi Yang	DAP	Lai Chii Wen	GERAKAN				
P78	Cameron Highlands	N02	Jelai	19,182	Wan Rosdy Wan Ismail	BN (UMNO)	Wan Rosdy Wan Ismail	UMNO	Ismail Mohd Hussin	PKR	Abdul Rasid Mohamed Ali	BERSATU				
P79	Lipis	N03	Padang Tengku	19,407	Mustapa Long	BN (UMNO)	Mustapa Long	UMNO	Ruzi @ Nata Yusuff	AMANAH	Muhamed Khaider Kamil	PAS	Mohd Rostam Mustapha	PEJUANG		
P79	Lipis	N04	Cheka	16,822	Lee Ah Wong	BN (MCA)	Ho Fong Mee	MCA	Rasid Muhamad	PKR	Tuan Ibrahim Tuan Man	PAS	Aishaton Abu Bakar	PEJUANG		
P79	Lipis	N05	Benta	10,895	Mohd. Soffi Abd. Razak	BN (UMNO)	Mohd. Soffi Abd. Razak	UMNO	Rizal Jamin	PKR	Muhammad Fareed Tarmizi	BERSATU				
P80	Raub	N06	Batu Talam	19,683	Abdul Aziz Mat Kiram	BN (UMNO)	Abdul Aziz Mat Kiram	UMNO	Shahuddin Abdul Rahman	PKR	Ahmad Sabri Mat Dui	BERSATU				
P80	Raub	N07	Tras	38,329	Chow Yu Hui	PH (DAP)	Lim Teck Hoe	MCA	Tengku Zulpuri Shah Raja Puji	DAP	Amirul Mukminin Kuek Abdullah	GERAKAN	Mohd Tahir Kassim	PEJUANG		
P80	Raub	N08	Dong	17,052	Shahiruddin Ab Moin	BN (UMNO)	Fadzli Mohamad Kamal	UMNO	Mohd Abd Jawaad Abd Ghafar @ Ramzin	AMANAH	Tengku Shah Amir Tengku Perang	PAS				
P81	Jerantut	N09	Tahan	20,895	Mohd Zakhwan Ahmad Badarddin	PN (PAS)	Faezah Ishak	UMNO	Mohd Abd Talib Mohd Tahar	AMANAH	Mohd Zakhwan Ahmad Badarddin	PAS				
P81	Jerantut	N10	Damak	34,967	Zuridan Mohd Daud	PN (PAS)	Muhamad Fasal Jamlus	UMNO	Mohamad Rafly Mohd Satar	PKR	Zuridan Md Daud	PAS			Izzuddin Ismail	IND
P81	Jerantut	N11	Pulau Tawar	31,189	Nazri Ngah	BN (UMNO)	Nazri Ngah	UMNO	Norani Muhd @ Mohd Arshad	AMANAH	Yohanis Ahmad	PAS	Mohd Rosidi Hassan	PEJUANG	Ridzuan Mansor	IND
P82	Indera Mahkota	N12	Beserah	59,370	Andansura Rabu	PN (PAS)	Mustaffar Kamal Ab Hamid	UMNO	Zulkifli Mohamed	AMANAH	Andansura Rabu	PAS	Mohd Pauzi Taib	PEJUANG	Joseph Tang	IND
P82	Indera Mahkota	N13	Semambu	61,179	Lee Chean Chung	PH (PKR)	Khairul Hisham Omar	UMNO	Chan Chun Kang	PKR	Zulfadhli Zakariah	PAS	Rashidah Abd Rahman	BERJASA		
P83	Kuantan	N14	Teruntum	30,854	Sim Chon Siang	PH (PKR)	Tee Choon Ser	MCA	Sim Chon Siang	PKR	Yap Kim Heng	GERAKAN	Khairul Afifie Abdullah	PEJUANG		
P83	Kuantan	N15	Tanjung Lumpur	38,185	Rosli Abdul Jabar	PN (PAS)	Nara @ Nikman Nordin	UMNO	Sabrina Md Yusuff	AMANAH	Rosli Abdul Jabar	PAS	Ab'alim Ruslam Ahmad	PEJUANG		
P83	Kuantan	N16	Inderapura	18,558	Shafik Fauzan Sharif	BN (UMNO)	Shafik Fauzan Sharif	UMNO	Fakhrul Anuar Zulkawi	PKR	Mohd Hafizal Mohamed Shah	PAS	Norashikin Ismail	PEJUANG		
P84	Paya Besar	N17	Sungai Lembing	19,130	Md Sohaimi Mohamed Shah	BN (UMNO)	Umor Arbain Dollah	UMNO	Ahmad Omar	PKR	Mohamad Ayub Asri	PAS	Anuar Tajuddin	PEJUANG		
P84	Paya Besar	N18	Lepar	25,728	Abdul Rahim Muda	BN (UMNO)	Abdul Rahim Muda	UMNO	Muhammad Ibrohim Mazalan	AMANAH	Mohd Yazid Mohd Yunus	BERSATU	Rosminahar Mohd Amin	PEJUANG		
P84	Paya Besar	N19	Panching	34,886	Mohd Tarmizi Yahaya	PN (PAS)	Fauziah Abdul Wahab	UMNO	Haslindalina Hashim	PKR	Mohd Tarmizi Yahya	PAS	Afif Syairol Abdul Rahim	PEJUANG		
P85	Pekan	N20	Pulau Manis	30,113	Khairuddin Mahmud	BN (UMNO)	Khairuddin Mahmud	UMNO	Muhammad Khairi Khalid	DAP	Mohammad Rafiq Khan Ahmad Khan	PAS				
P85	Pekan	N21	Peramu Jaya	41,915	Sh Mohamed Puzi Sh Ali	BN (UMNO)	Mohd Nizar Mohd Najib	UMNO	Tugimon Abdul Hamid	AMANAH	Abu Talib Muhammad	BERSATU			Tengku Zainul Hisham Tengku Hussin	IND
P85	Pekan	N22	Bebar	21,294	Mohd. Fakhruddin Mohd. Arif	BN (UMNO)	Mohd. Fakhruddin Mohd. Arif	UMNO	Ibrahim Sulaiman	AMANAH	Narzatul Haidar Sakim	BERSATU				
P85	Pekan	N23	Chini	26,121	Mohd Sharim Md Zain	BN (UMNO)	Mohd Sharim Md Zain	UMNO	Mohamad Yazid Che Mat	PKR	Fakhrur Rozi Jalaluddin	PAS				
P86	Maran	N24	Luit	16,279	Mohd Sofian Abd Jalil	PN (PAS)	Jamaluddin Md Marzuki	UMNO	Mohd Afandi Abd Rani	PKR	Mohd Sofian Abd Jalil	PAS				
P86	Maran	N25	Kuala Sentul	17,434	Shahaniza Shamsuddin	BN (UMNO)	Mohd Khairuddin Mohd Ali Hanafiah	UMNO	Amran Tahir	PKR	Jasri Jamaludin	BERSATU				
P86	Maran	N26	Chenor	19,415	Mujjibur Rahman Ishak	PN (PAS)	Saiful Anuar Mokhtar	UMNO	Nor Hisham Mohd Suki	AMANAH	Mujibur Rahman Ishak	PAS				
P87	Kuala Krau	N27	Jenderak	13,994	Mohamed Jaafar	BN (UMNO)	Rodzuan Zaaba	UMNO	Mohamad Hafez Harun	PKR	Md Anuar Daud	PAS				
P87	Kuala Krau	N28	Kerdau	15,184	Syed Ibrahim Syed Ahmad	BN (UMNO)	Syed Ibrahim Syed Ahmad	UMNO	Ahmad Ariff Md Daud	AMANAH	Mohd Arhan Mohd Saludin	BERSATU				
P87	Kuala Krau	N29	Jengka	31,359	Shahril Azman Abd Halim	PN (PAS)	Nor Hashimi Abdul Ghani	UMNO	Jamaluddin Abd Rahim	AMANAH	Sharil Azman Abdul Halim	PAS				
P88	Temerloh	N30	Mentakab	37,269	Woo Chee Wan	PH (DAP)	Wong Tze Shiang	MCA	Woo Chee Wan	DAP	Mohd Yusoff Abdullah	BERSATU	Abdul Wahab Kadir	PUTRA		
P88	Temerloh	N31	Lanchang	32,774	Mohd Sharkar Shamsudin	BN (UMNO)	Radzmi Sudin	UMNO	Rosli Ismail @ Ahmad	PKR	Hassan Omar	PAS	Zaini Mohamad	PEJUANG	Jamil Yaakub	PRM
P88	Temerloh	N32	Kuala Semantan	36,786	Nor Azmi Mat Ludin	BN (UMNO)	Nor Azmi Mat Ludin	UMNO	Azizul Shah Mohd Noor	AMANAH	Hassanuddin Salim	PAS	Mohd Syafiq Mohd Khaidir	PEJUANG		
P89	Bentong	N33	Bilut	24,286	Lee Chin Chen	PH (DAP)	Wong Siew Mun	MCA	Lee Chin Chen	DAP	Chandra Balabedha	GERAKAN	Mohd Shokri Mahmood	PEJUANG		
P89	Bentong	N34	Ketari	30,758	Young Syefura Othman	PH (DAP)	Amizar Abu Adam	UMNO	Thomas Su Keong Siong	DAP	Tan Wei Liong	GERAKAN				
P89	Bentong	N35	Sabai	15,643	Kamache Doray Rajoo	PH (DAP)	V. Arumugam	MIC	Kamache Doray Rajoo	DAP	Nurul Qomar Abdol Talib @ Ramali	BERSATU				
P89	Bentong	N36	Pelangai	16,371	Adnan Yaakob	BN (UMNO)	Johari Harun	UMNO	Ahmed Wafiuddin Shamsuri	AMANAH	Kasim Samat	PAS	Isa Ahmad	PEJUANG		
P90	Bera	N37	Guai	24,412	Norol Azali Sulaiman	BN (UMNO)	Sabariah Saidan	UMNO	Noraini Abdul Ghani	AMANAH	Nor Hashimah Mat Noh	BERSATU			Jafari Mohd Yusof	IND
P90	Bera	N38	Triang	25,891	Leong Yu Man	PH (DAP)	Yee Cheeng Hwa	MCA	Leong Yu Man	DAP	Muhammad Izzudin Zulkifli	BERSATU				
P90	Bera	N39	Kemayan	27,366	Mohd Fadil Osman	BN (UMNO)	Khairulnizam Mohamad Zuldin	UMNO	Disqualified		Shapuan Hussin	PAS				
P91	Rompin	N40	Bukit Ibam	31,003	Samsiah Arshad	BN (UMNO)	Samsiah Arshad	UMNO	Bariral Mohd Mokhtar	PKR	Nazri Ahmad	PAS				
P91	Rompin	N41	Muadzam Shah	29,663	Razali Kassim	BN (UMNO)	Razali Kassim	UMNO	Norlaily Forizad	PKR	Jaafar Mustaffa	BERSATU				
P91	Rompin	N42	Tioman	28,465	Mohd. Johari Husin	BN (UMNO)	Mohd. Johari Husin	UMNO	Mohd Fadzli Mohd Ramly	AMANAH	Nor Idayu Hashim	PAS	Osman Bakar	PEJUANG	Sulaiman Bakar	IND

== Results ==
Party or alliance		Votes	%	Seats	+/–
Perikatan Nasional	Malaysian Islamic Party	244,114	28.15	15	+7
Perikatan Nasional	Malaysian United Indigenous Party	77,196	8.90	2	+2
Perikatan Nasional	Parti Gerakan Rakyat Malaysia	16,915	1.95	0	0
Perikatan Nasional	Total	338,225	39.00	17	+9
Barisan Nasional	United Malays National Organisation	290,855	33.54	16	–9
Barisan Nasional	Malaysian Chinese Association	38,322	4.42	0	–1
Barisan Nasional	Malaysian Indian Congress	4,444	0.51	1	+1
Barisan Nasional	Total	333,621	38.47	17	–9
Pakatan Harapan	Democratic Action Party	75,698	8.73	6	–1
Pakatan Harapan	People's Justice Party	69,118	7.97	2	0
Pakatan Harapan	National Trust Party	43,425	5.01	0	0
Pakatan Harapan	Total	188,241	21.70	8	–1
Gerakan Tanah Air	Homeland Fighter's Party	3,403	0.39	0	New
Gerakan Tanah Air	Pan-Malaysian Islamic Front	820	0.09	0	0
Gerakan Tanah Air	Parti Bumiputera Perkasa Malaysia	785	0.09	0	0
Gerakan Tanah Air	Total	5,008	0.58	0	0
Parti Rakyat Malaysia		203	0.02	0	0
Independents		1,989	0.23	0	0
Total		867,287	100.00	42	0
Valid votes		867,287	98.70		
Invalid/blank votes		11,467	1.30		
Total votes		878,754	100.00		
Registered voters/turnout		1,136,944	77.29		
Source: SPR, SPR

=== By parliamentary constituency ===
Perikatan Nasional won 8 of 14 parliamentary constituency.

No.	Constituency	Barisan Nasional	Pakatan Harapan	Perikatan Nasional	Member of Parliament
P078	Cameron Highlands	52.53%	34.05%	13.42%	Ramli Mohd Nor
P079	Lipis	43.41%	16.42%	39.45%	Abdul Rahman Mohamad
P080	Raub	35.50%	38.24%	25.66%	Tengku Zulpuri Shah Raja Puji (14th Parliament)
P080	Raub	35.50%	38.24%	25.66%	Chow Yu Hui (15th Parliament)
P081	Jerantut	34.39%	15.61%	48.99%	Ahmad Nazlan Idris (14th Parliament)
P081	Jerantut	34.39%	15.61%	48.99%	Khairil Nizam Khirudin (15th Parliament)
P082	Indera Mahkota	21.18%	33.48%	43.90%	Saifuddin Abdullah
P083	Kuantan	28.11%	30.72%	39.09%	Fuziah Salleh (14th Parliament)
P083	Kuantan	28.11%	30.72%	39.09%	Wan Razali Wan Nor (15th Parliament)
P084	Paya Besar	35.42%	14.76%	49.31%	Mohd. Shahar Abdullah
P085	Pekan	53.21%	6.56%	40.01%	Vacant (14th Parliament)
P085	Pekan	53.21%	6.56%	40.01%	Sh Mohmed Puzi Sh Ali (15th Parliament)
P086	Maran	40.80%	8.38%	50.81%	Ismail Abdul Mutalib
P087	Kuala Krau	42.60%	7.43%	49.97%	Ismail Mohamed Said (14th Parliament)
P087	Kuala Krau	42.60%	7.43%	49.97%	Kamal Ashaari (15th Parliament)
P088	Temerloh	31.75%	28.65%	38.34%	Mohd Anuar Mohd Tahir (14th Parliament)
P088	Temerloh	31.75%	28.65%	38.34%	Salamiah Mohd Nor (15th Parliament)
P089	Bentong	40.75%	37.53%	20.97%	Wong Tack (14th Parliament)
P089	Bentong	40.75%	37.53%	20.97%	Young Syefura Othman (15th Parliament)
P090	Bera	47.39%	21.68%	29.26%	Ismail Sabri Yaakob
P091	Rompin	46.64%	5.45%	47.68%	Hasan Arifin (14th Parliament)
P091	Rompin	46.64%	5.45%	47.68%	Abdul Khalib Abdullah (15th Parliament)

=== Seats that changed allegiance ===
No.	Seat	Previous Party (2018)	Current Party (2022)
N04	Cheka	Barisan Nasional (MCA)	Perikatan Nasional (PAS)
N11	Pulau Tawar	Barisan Nasional (UMNO)	Perikatan Nasional (PAS)
N17	Sungai Lembing	Barisan Nasional (UMNO)	Perikatan Nasional (PAS)
N18	Lepar	Barisan Nasional (UMNO)	Perikatan Nasional (Bersatu)
N20	Pulau Manis	Barisan Nasional (UMNO)	Perikatan Nasional (PAS)
N25	Kuala Sentul	Barisan Nasional (UMNO)	Perikatan Nasional (Bersatu)
N31	Lanchang	Barisan Nasional (UMNO)	Perikatan Nasional (PAS)
N32	Kuala Semantan	Barisan Nasional (UMNO)	Perikatan Nasional (PAS)
N35	Sabai	Pakatan Harapan (DAP)	Barisan Nasional (MIC)
N40	Bukit Ibam	Barisan Nasional (UMNO)	Perikatan Nasional (PAS)

== See also ==
- 2022 Malaysian general election
- Politics of Malaysia
- List of political parties in Malaysia
