= Kemayan (state constituency) =

Political subdivision in Malaysia

Kemayan (N39)
Pahang constituency

State constituency
- Legislature: Pahang State Legislative Assembly
MLA
Khaizulnizam Mohamad Zuldin
BN
- Constituency created: 2003
- First contested: 2004
- Last contested: 2022

Demographics
- Electors (2022): 27,366

Kemayan is a state constituency in Pahang, Malaysia, that is represented in the Pahang State Legislative Assembly.

== Demographics ==
Ethnic breakdown of Kemayan's electorate as of 2022
1. Malay (71.5%)
2. Other ethnicities (13.0%)
3. Chinese (11.6%)
4. Indian (3.90%)

== History ==
=== Polling districts ===
According to the federal gazette issued on 31 October 2022, the Kemayan constituency is divided into 13 polling districts.

State constituency	Polling district	Code	Location
Kemayan（N39）	Bukit Gemuroh	090/39/01	SK Bukit Gemuruh
Kemayan（N39）	FELDA Triang Dua & Tiga	090/39/02	SMK Triang 3
Kemayan（N39）	FELDA Tementi	090/39/03	SK LKTP Tementi
Kemayan（N39）	FELDA Rentam	090/39/04	SK LKTP Rentam
Kemayan（N39）	FELDA Sebertak	090/39/05	SK LKTP Sebertak
Kemayan（N39）	FELDA Bera Selatan	090/39/06	Dewan Orang Ramai Bera Selatan 7
Kemayan（N39）	Kampung Pasal	090/39/07	Dewan Kampung Pasal
Kemayan（N39）	Pos Iskandar	090/39/08	SK Iskandar
Kemayan（N39）	FELDA Tembagau	090/39/09	SK LKTP Tembagau 1
Kemayan（N39）	FELDA Triang Satu	090/39/10	SK LKTP Triang 2
Kemayan（N39）	Kampung Dato Seri Hamzah	090/39/11	SK Kemayan
Kemayan（N39）	Kemayan	090/39/12	SMK Kemayan
Kemayan（N39）	Ladang Kemayan	090/39/13	SJK (C) Kemayan

=== Representation history ===
Members of the Legislative Assembly for Kemayan
Assembly	No	Years	Name	Party
Constituency created from Bera
11th	N39	2004-2008	Mohd Hayani Abdul Rahman	BN (UMNO)
12th	N39	2008-2013	Mohd Fadil Osman	BN (UMNO)
13th	N39	2013-2018	Mohd Fadil Osman	BN (UMNO)
14th	N39	2018-2022	Mohd Fadil Osman	BN (UMNO)
15th	N39	2022–present	Khaizulnizam Mohamad Zuldin	BN (UMNO)

== Election results ==
Pahang state election, 2022
Party	Candidate	Votes	%	∆%
BN	Khaizulnizam Mohamad Zuldin	13,778	66.74	▲12.38
PN	Safuan Husin	6,865	33.26	▲33.26
Total valid votes		20,643	100.00	
Total rejected ballots		1,209		
Unreturned ballots		28		
Turnout		21,880	79.95	▼2.94
Registered electors		27,366		
Majority		6,913	33.49	▲3.71
BN hold		Swing		

Pahang state election, 2018
Party	Candidate	Votes	%	∆%
BN	Mohd Fadil Osman	8,430	54.36	▼11.64
PKR	Manolan Mohamad	3,812	24.58	▼9.42
PAS	Md Yusof Che Din	3,265	21.06	▲21.06
Total valid votes		15,507	100.00	
Total rejected ballots		387		
Unreturned ballots		84		
Turnout		15,978	82.89	▼1.54
Registered electors		19,275		
Majority		4,618	29.78	▼2.22
BN hold		Swing		

Pahang state election, 2013
Party	Candidate	Votes	%	∆%
BN	Mohd Fadil Osman	8,379	66.00	▼4.48
PKR	Manolan Mohamad	4,316	34.00	▲4.48
Total valid votes		12,695	100.00	
Total rejected ballots		310		
Unreturned ballots		28		
Turnout		13,033	84.43	▲9.32
Registered electors		15,436		
Majority		4,063	32.00	▼8.96
BN hold		Swing		

Pahang state election, 2008
Party	Candidate	Votes	%	∆%
BN	Mohd Fadil Osman	6,328	70.48	▲1.54
PKR	Mohd Shukri Mohd Ramli	2,650	29.52	▼1.54
Total valid votes		8,978	100.00	
Total rejected ballots		237		
Unreturned ballots		0		
Turnout		9,215	75.11	▼0.59
Registered electors		12,268		
Majority		3,678	40.97	▲3.08
BN hold		Swing		

Pahang state election, 2004
Party	Candidate	Votes	%
BN	Mohd Hayani Abd Rahman	5,690	68.94
PKR	Amir Abd Aziz	2,563	31.06
Total valid votes		8,253	100.00
Total rejected ballots		222	
Unreturned ballots		5	
Turnout		8,480	75.70
Registered electors		11,202	
Majority		3,127	37.89
This was a new constituency created.
