= Pahang State Legislative Assembly =

Legislative branch of the Pahang state government

Pahang State Legislative Assembly Dewan Negeri Pahang ديوان نݢري ڤهڠ
- 15th Pahang State Legislative Assembly

Type
- Type: Unicameral

History
- Founded: 22 August 1959

Leadership
- Sultan: Al-Sultan Abdullah Ri'ayatuddin Al-Mustafa Billah Shah ibni Almarhum Sultan Haji Ahmad Shah Al-Musta’in Billah since 15 January 2019
- Speaker: Mohd Sharkar Shamsudin, BN–UMNO since 29 December 2022
- Deputy Speaker: Lee Chin Chen, PH-DAP since 29 December 2022
- Menteri Besar: Wan Rosdy Wan Ismail, BN–UMNO since 15 May 2018
- Opposition Leader: Tuan Ibrahim Tuan Man, PAS since 6 December 2022
- Secretary: Mohd Zukri Sidek

Structure
- Seats: 42+5 Nominated Member (Maximum 47 Members); Quorum: 14; Simple majority: 22; Two-thirds majority: 28
- Political groups: (as of 13 May 2024) Government (30) BN (19): UMNO (17); MIC (1); MCA (1); PH (10): DAP (6); PKR (3); AMANAH (1); Independent (1) Support (2); PN (2): BERSATU (2); Opposition (15); PN (15): PAS (15); Speaker (1) BN (non-MLA)
- Committees: 4: Public Accounts Committee; Rules of Proceedings Committee; Right and Privileges Committee; Committee of Selection

Elections
- Voting system: Plurality: First-past-the-post (42 single-member constituencies)
- Last election: 19 November 2022
- Next election: By 27 February 2028

Meeting place
- Wisma Seri Pahang, Kuantan, Pahang

Website
- www.pahang.gov.my

The Pahang State Legislative Assembly (Malay: Dewan Negeri Pahang) is the unicameral state legislature of the Malaysian state of Pahang. It is composed of 42 members representing single-member constituencies throughout the state.

The Assembly convenes at the Wisma Seri Pahang in the state capital, Kuantan.

Map of current constituencies (since 2018)

== Current composition ==
Government							Opposition
BN			PH			IND	PN
19			10			1	17
17	1	1	6	3	1	1	15	2
UMNO	MIC	MCA	DAP	PKR	AMANAH	IND	PAS	BERSATU

No.	Parliamentary Constituency	No.	State Constituency	Member	Coalition (Party)	Remark
-	-	-	Non-MLA	Mohd Sharkar Shamsudin	BN (UMNO)	Speaker
P78	Cameron Highlands	N01	Tanah Rata	Ho Chi Yang	PH (DAP)	N/A
P78	Cameron Highlands	N02	Jelai	Wan Rosdy Wan Ismail	BN (UMNO)	Menteri Besar
P79	Lipis	N03	Padang Tengku	Mustapa Long	BN (UMNO)	N/A
P79	Lipis	N04	Cheka	Tuan Ibrahim Tuan Man	PN (PAS)	Opposition Leader; MP for Kubang Kerian
P79	Lipis	N05	Benta	Mohd. Soffi Abd. Razak	BN (UMNO)	EXCO member
P80	Raub	N06	Batu Talam	Abdul Aziz Mat Kiram	BN (UMNO)	N/A
P80	Raub	N07	Tras	Tengku Zulpuri Shah Raja Puji	PH (DAP)	N/A
P80	Raub	N08	Dong	Fadzli Mohamad Kamal	BN (UMNO)	EXCO member
P81	Jerantut	N09	Tahan	Mohd Zakhwan Ahmad Badarddin	PN (PAS)	N/A
P81	Jerantut	N10	Damak	Zuridan Mohd Daud	PN (PAS)	N/A
P81	Jerantut	N11	Pulau Tawar	Yohanis Ahmad	PN (PAS)	N/A
P82	Indera Mahkota	N12	Beserah	Andansura Rabu	PN (PAS)	N/A
P82	Indera Mahkota	N13	Semambu	Chan Chun Kuang	PH (PKR)	N/A
P83	Kuantan	N14	Teruntum	Sim Chon Siang	PH (PKR)	EXCO member
P83	Kuantan	N15	Tanjung Lumpur	Rosli Abdul Jabar	PN (PAS)	N/A
P83	Kuantan	N16	Inderapura	Shafik Fauzan Sharif	BN (UMNO)	N/A
P84	Paya Besar	N17	Sungai Lembing	Mohamad Ayub Mat Ashri	PN (PAS)	N/A
P84	Paya Besar	N18	Lepar	Mohd Yazid Mohd Yunus	PN (BERSATU)	N/A
P84	Paya Besar	N19	Panching	Mohd Tarmizi Yahaya	PN (PAS)	N/A
P85	Pekan	N20	Pulau Manis	Mohd Rafiq Khan Ahmad Khan	PN (PAS)	N/A
P85	Pekan	N21	Peramu Jaya	Mohamad Nizar Mohammad Najib	BN (UMNO)	EXCO member
P85	Pekan	N22	Bebar	Mohd Fakhruddin Mohd Ariff	BN (UMNO)	EXCO member
P85	Pekan	N23	Chini	Mohd Sharim Md Zain	BN (UMNO)	N/A
P86	Maran	N24	Luit	Mohd Sofian Abd Jalil	PN (PAS)	N/A
P86	Maran	N25	Kuala Sentul	Jasri Jamaluddin	PN (BERSATU)	N/A
P86	Maran	N26	Chenor	Mujjibur Rahman Ishak	PN (PAS)	N/A
P87	Kuala Krau	N27	Jenderak	Rodzuan Zaaba	BN (UMNO)	N/A
P87	Kuala Krau	N28	Kerdau	Syed Ibrahim Syed Ahmad	BN (UMNO)	EXCO member
P87	Kuala Krau	N29	Jengka	Shahril Azman Abd Halim	PN (PAS)	N/A
P88	Temerloh	N30	Mentakab	Woo Chee Wan	PH (DAP)	N/A
P88	Temerloh	N31	Lanchang	Hassan Omar	PN (PAS)	N/A
P88	Temerloh	N32	Kuala Semantan	Hassanuddin Salim	PN (PAS)	N/A
P89	Bentong	N33	Bilut	Lee Chin Chen	PH (DAP)	Deputy Speaker
P89	Bentong	N34	Ketari	Thomas Su Keong Siong	PH (DAP)	N/A
P89	Bentong	N35	Sabai	Arumugam Verappa Pillai	BN (MIC)	N/A
P89	Bentong	N36	Pelangai	Amizar Abu Adam (Note: Johari Harun (BN-UMNO), who held the seat since 2022, died in the Elmina plane crash on 17 August 2023.)	BN (UMNO)	EXCO member
P90	Bera	N37	Guai	Sabariah Saidan	BN (UMNO)	EXCO member
P90	Bera	N38	Triang	Leong Yu Man	PH (DAP)	EXCO member
P90	Bera	N39	Kemayan	Khaizulnizam Mohamad Zuldin	BN (UMNO)	N/A
P91	Rompin	N40	Bukit Ibam	Nazri Ahmad	PN (PAS)	N/A
P91	Rompin	N41	Muadzam Shah	Razali Kassim	BN (UMNO)	EXCO member
P91	Rompin	N42	Tioman	Mohd Johari Hussain	BN (UMNO)	N/A
N/A	N/A	—	Nominated member	Haris Salleh Hamzah	BN (UMNO)	N/A
N/A	N/A	—	Nominated member	Wong Tat Chee	BN (MCA)	N/A
N/A	N/A	—	Nominated member	Rizal Jamin	PH (PKR)	N/A
N/A	N/A	—	Nominated member	Mohd Fadzli Mohd Ramly	PH (AMANAH)	N/A
N/A	N/A	—	Nominated member	Ahmad Irshadi Abdullah	IND	N/A

== Seating arrangement ==
Vacant	Vacant	Vacant	Vacant		Vacant	Vacant	Vacant	Vacant
Vacant	N17 Sungai Lembing	N20 Pulau Manis	N31 Lanchang		N39 Kemayan	N35 Sabai	N27 Jenderak	Vacant
Vacant	N11 Pulau Tawar	N12 Beserah	N09 Tahan		N36 Pelangai (EXCO Member)	N38 Triang (EXCO Member)	N23 Chini	Vacant
Rizal Jamin	N25 Kuala Sentul	N15 Tanjung Lumpur	D	Sergeant-at-Arm	C	N14 Teruntum (EXCO Member)	N03 Padang Tengku	Vacant
		N04 Cheka (Opposition Leader)	E		B	N08 Dong (EXCO Member)
Mohd Fadzli Mohd Ramly	N18 Lepar	Vacant	E		B	N37 Guai (EXCO Member)	N06 Batu Talam	Vacant
Haris Salleh Hamzah	N29 Jengka	N13 Semambu	E		B	N21 Peramu Jaya (EXCO Member)	N42 Tioman	Vacant
Wong Tat Chee	N26 Chenor	N01 Tanah Rata	E	the Mace	B	N41 Muadzam Shah (EXCO Member)	N16 Inderapura	Vacant
		N30 Mentakab	F		A	N22 Bebar (EXCO Member)
Ahmad Irshadi Abdullah	N24 Luit	N34 Ketari	F		A	N28 Kerdau (EXCO Member)	State Financial Officer	Vacant
N40 Bukit Ibam	N19 Panching	N07 Tras	F		A	N05 Benta (EXCO Member)	State Legal Advisor	Vacant
N32 Kuala Semantan	N10 Damak	N33 Bilut (Deputy Speaker)	F	Secretary	A	N02 Jelai (Menteri Besar)	State Secretary	Vacant
				Speaker
				Sultan

== Role ==
As the state's legislative body, the Pahang State Legislative Assembly's main function is to enact laws that apply to Pahang, known as enactments. The Speaker presides over the Assembly's proceedings, and works to maintain order during debates.

The state government's executive branch (known as the State Executive Council (EXCO), or Majlis Mesyuarat Kerajaan Negeri), including the Menteri Besar, are drawn from the Assembly. The Menteri Besar is ceremonially appointed by the Sultan of Pahang on the basis that he is able to command a majority in the Assembly. The Menteri Besar then appoints members of the State EXCO drawing from members of the Assembly.

== Pahang state elections, 2022 ==
Party or alliance		Votes	%	Seats	+/–
Perikatan Nasional	Malaysian Islamic Party	244,142	27.95	15	+7
Perikatan Nasional	Malaysian United Indigenous Party	79,321	9.08	2	+2
Perikatan Nasional	Parti Gerakan Rakyat Malaysia	16,915	1.94	0	0
Perikatan Nasional	Total	340,378	38.97	17	+9
Barisan Nasional	United Malays National Organisation	294,767	33.75	16	–9
Barisan Nasional	Malaysian Chinese Association	38,322	4.39	0	–1
Barisan Nasional	Malaysian Indian Congress	4,444	0.51	1	+1
Barisan Nasional	Total	337,533	38.65	17	–9
Pakatan Harapan	People's Justice Party	69,145	7.92	2	0
Pakatan Harapan	National Trust Party	43,387	4.97	0	0
Pakatan Harapan	Democratic Action Party	75,698	8.67	6	–1
Pakatan Harapan	Total	188,230	21.55	8	–1
Gerakan Tanah Air	Homeland Fighter's Party	4,188	0.48	0	New
Gerakan Tanah Air	Pan-Malaysian Islamic Front	820	0.09	0	0
Gerakan Tanah Air	Total	5,008	0.57	0	0
Parti Rakyat Malaysia		203	0.02	0	0
Independents		1,989	0.23	0	0
Total		873,341	100.00	42	0
Valid votes		873,341	98.70		
Invalid/blank votes		11,467	1.30		
Total votes		884,808	100.00		
Registered voters/turnout		1,136,944	77.82		
Source: SPR, SPR

== Pahang state elections, 2018 ==
Summary of the 9 May 2018 Pahang State Assembly election results
	Votes	% of vote	+/–	Seats	% of seats	+/–
Barisan Nasional:	275,766	41.64	▼	25	59.5	▼5
United Malays National Organisation (UMNO)	220,715	33.32	▼	24	57.1	▼4
Malaysian Chinese Association (MCA)	40,241	6.08	▼	1	2.4	▼1
Malaysian Indian Congress (MIC)	3,879	0.59	▼	0	0.0	Steady
Malaysian People's Movement Party (GERAKAN)	10,931	1.65	▼	0	0.0	Steady
Pakatan Harapan:	192,837	29.12	▲	9	21.4	Steady
Democratic Action Party (DAP)	71,396	10.78	▲	7	16.7	Steady
People's Justice Party (PKR)	64,338	9.71	▲	2	4.8	Steady
Malaysian United Indigenous Party (PPBM)	14,722	2.22	▲	0	0.0	Steady
National Trust Party (AMANAH)	42,381	6.40	▲	0	0.0	Steady
Others	192,432	29.05	▲	8	19.0	▲5
Pan-Malaysian Islamic Party (PAS)	192,203	29.02	▲	8	19.0	▲5
Parti Sosialis Malaysia (PSM)	229	0.03	▲	0	0.0	Steady
Independents	1,281	0.19	▲	0	0.0	Steady
Valid votes	662,316					
Invalid/blank votes	11,065					
Total votes	673,381		Steady			Steady
Registered voters	823,981					
Source: undi.info

== Election pendulum ==
The 15th General Election witnessed 25 governmental seats and 17 non-governmental seats filled the Pahang State Legislative Assembly. The government side has 4 safe seats and 4 fairly safe seats, while the non-government side has just 1 safe seat and fairly safe seat each.

2022 Pahang state election

GOVERNMENT SEATS
Marginal
Sabai	Arumugam A. Verappa Pillai	MIC	37.52
Semambu	Chan Chun Kang	PKR	40.01
Ketari	Thomas Su Keong Siong	DAP	41.17
Dong	Fadzli Mohamad Kamal	UMNO	45.34
Mentakab	Woo Chee Wan	DAP	45.38
Inderapura	Shafik Fauzan Sharif	UMNO	46.15
Padang Tengku	Mustapa Long	UMNO	47.14
Bilut	Lee Chin Chen	DAP	48.15
Benta	Mohd. Soffi Abd. Razak	UMNO	48.21
Tioman	Mohd. Johari Hussain	UMNO	48.95
Muadzam Shah	Ir. Razali Kassim	UMNO	49.35
Guai	Sabariah Saidan	UMNO	49.46
Jenderak	Rodzuan Zaaba	UMNO	50.03
Batu Talam	Abd. Aziz Mat Kiram	UMNO	52.98
Tanah Rata	Ho Chi Yang	DAP	53.04
Chini	Mohd. Sharim Md. Zain	UMNO	53.25
Kerdau	Syed Ibrahim Syed Ahmad	UMNO	53.88
Fairly safe
Triang	Leong Yu Man	DAP	57.02
Peramu Jaya	Mohamad Nizar Mohd. Najib	UMNO	57.63
Pelangai	Johari Harun	UMNO	57.71
Teruntum	Sim Chon Siang	PKR	58.63
Safe
Tras	Tengku Zulpuri Shah Raja Puji	DAP	62.32
Kemayan	Khaizulnizam Mohamad Zuldin	UMNO	66.74
Bebar	Mohd. Fakhruddin Mohd. Ariff	UMNO	67.37
Jelai	Wan Rosdy Wan Ismail	UMNO	68.81

NON-GOVERNMENT SEATS
Marginal
Lanchang	Hassan Omar	PAS	40.15
Damak	Zuridan Mohd. Daud	PAS	41.53
Kuala Semantan	Hassanuddin Salim	PAS	42.45
Lepar	Mohd. Yazid Mohd. Yunus	BERSATU	42.77
Cheka	Tuan Ibrahim Tuan Man	PAS	45.51
Kuala Sentul	Jasri Jamaluddin	BERSATU	46.23
Sungai Lembing	Mohamad Ayub Mat Ashri	PAS	47.38
Luit	Mohd. Sofian Abd. Jalil	PAS	48.32
Beserah	Andansura Rabu	PAS	51.80
Bukit Ibam	Nazri Ahmad	PAS	52.88
Pulau Tawar	Yohanis Ahmad	PAS	53.73
Tahan	Mohd. Zakwan Ahmad Badarddin	PAS	53.97
Pulau Manis	Mohd. Rafiq Khan Ahmad Khan	PAS	54.21
Tanjung Lumpur	Rosli Abdul Jabar	PAS	54.98
Panching	Mohd. Tarmizi Yahaya	PAS	55.01
Fairly Safe
Chenor	Mujibur Rahman Ishak	PAS	56.51
Safe
Jengka	Shahril Azman Abd. Halim	PAS	61.67

== List of Assemblies ==
Assembly	Term began	Members	Committee	Governing parties
State Council	1955	33	Tengku Muhammad (1955–1957); Raja Abdullah (1957–1959)	Alliance (UMNO–MCA)
1st	1959	24	Wan Abdul Aziz	Alliance (UMNO–MCA)
2nd	1964	24	Yahya I	Alliance (UMNO–MCA)
3rd	1969	24	Yahya II (1969–1972)	Alliance (UMNO–MCA)
3rd	1969	24	Abdul Aziz (1972–1974)	Alliance (UMNO–MCA)–GERAKAN (1972–1973)
3rd	1969	24	Abdul Aziz (1972–1974)	BN (UMNO–MCA–GERAKAN) (1973–1974)
3rd	1969	24	Muhammad I (1974)	BN (UMNO–MCA–GERAKAN)
4th	1974	32	Muhammad II	BN (UMNO–MCA–GERAKAN–PAS) (1974–1977); BN (UMNO–MCA–GERAKAN) (1977–1978)
5th	1978	32	Abdul Rahim (1978–1981); Abdul Rashid (1981–1982)	BN (UMNO–MCA–MIC)
6th	1982	32	Najib	BN (UMNO–MCA–MIC–GERAKAN)
7th	1986	33	Mohd Khalil I	BN (UMNO–MCA–MIC–GERAKAN)
8th	1990	33	Mohd Khalil II	BN (UMNO–MCA–MIC–GERAKAN)
9th	1995	38	Mohd Khalil III (1995–1999); Adnan I (1999)	BN (UMNO–MCA–MIC–GERAKAN)
10th	1999	38	Adnan II	BN (UMNO–MCA–MIC–GERAKAN)
11th	2004	42	Adnan III	BN (UMNO–MCA–MIC–GERAKAN)
12th	2008	42	Adnan IV	BN (UMNO–MCA–MIC–GERAKAN)
13th	2013	42	Adnan V	BN (UMNO–MCA)
14th	2018	42	Wan Rosdy I	BN (UMNO–MCA) (2018–2019)
14th	2018	42	Wan Rosdy I	BN (UMNO–MCA)–PAS (2019–2020)
14th	2018	42	Wan Rosdy I	BN (UMNO–MCA)–PN (PAS) (2020–2022)
15th	2022	47	Wan Rosdy II	BN (UMNO–MIC–MCA)–PH (DAP–PKR–AMANAH) (2022–2026)
15th	2022	47	Wan Rosdy II	BN (UMNO–MIC–MCA)–PH (DAP–PKR–AMANAH)–BERSATU (2026–present)

== See also ==
- List of State Seats Representatives in Malaysia
- State legislative assemblies of Malaysia
