= Chenor (state constituency) =

Political subdivision in Malaysia

Chenor (N26)
Pahang constituency

State constituency
- Legislature: Pahang State Legislative Assembly
MLA
Mujjibur Rahman Ishak
PN
- Constituency created: 1959
- First contested: 1959
- Last contested: 2022

Demographics
- Electors (2022): 19,415

Chenor is a state constituency in Pahang, Malaysia, that has been represented in the Pahang State Legislative Assembly.

== Demographics ==
Ethnic breakdown of Chenor's electorate as of 2022
1. Malay (96.1%)
2. Other ethnicities (2.63%)
3. Indian (0.80%)
4. Chinese (0.47%)

== History ==
=== Polling districts ===
According to the federal gazette issued on 30 October 2022, the Chenor constituency is divided into 14 polling districts.

State constituency	Polling districts	Code	Location
Chenor (N26)	FELDA Jengka 6	086/26/01	SMK LKTP Jengka 6
Chenor (N26)	FELDA Jengka 7	086/26/02	SK LKTP Jengka 7
Chenor (N26)	Paya Pasir	086/26/03	SK Paya Pasir
Chenor (N26)	Pesagi	086/26/04	SK Pesagi
Chenor (N26)	Pejing	086/26/05	Balai Raya Kampung Pejing
Chenor (N26)	Kertau	086/26/06	SK Kertau
Chenor (N26)	Sekara	086/26/07	SK Sekara
Chenor (N26)	Chenor Seberang	086/26/08	SK Chenor
Chenor (N26)	Bandar Chenor	086/26/09	SMK Tengku Ampuan Afzan
Chenor (N26)	Bukit Segumpal	086/26/10	SK Tanjung Perang
Chenor (N26)	FELDA Kampung Awah	086/26/11	SK RKTP Kampung Awah
Chenor (N26)	FELDA Sungai Nerek	082/26/12	SK LKTP Sungai Nerek
Chenor (N26)	Bukit Lada	086/26/13	SK Bukit Lada
Chenor (N26)	Kampung Jengka	086/26/14	SK Jengka Batu 13

=== Representation history ===
Members of the Legislative Assembly for Chenor
Assembly	No	Years	Name	Party
Constituency created
Chenor
1st	N16	1959-1964	Wan Abdul Aziz Ungku Abdullah	Alliance (UMNO)
2nd	N16	1964-1969	Salehuddin A. Pekan	Alliance (UMNO)
		1969–1971	Assembly dissolved	
3rd	N16	1971-1973	Wan Ahmad Tajuddin Wan Hassan	Alliance (UMNO)
3rd	N16	1973-1974	Wan Ahmad Tajuddin Wan Hassan	BN (UMNO)
4th	N20	1974-1978	Mahmud Mat Taib	BN (UMNO)
5th	N20	1978-1982	Mahmud Mat Taib	BN (UMNO)
6th	N20	1982-1986	Mahmud Mat Taib	BN (UMNO)
Cenur
7th	N21	1986-1990	Mahmud Mat Taib	BN (UMNO)
8th	N21	1990-1995	Tan Mohd Aminuddin Ishak	BN (UMNO)
9th	N24	1995-1999	Tan Mohd Aminuddin Ishak	BN (UMNO)
10th	N24	1999-2004	Tan Mohd Aminuddin Ishak	BN (UMNO)
Chenor
11th	N26	2004-2008	Tan Mohd Aminuddin Ishak	BN (UMNO)
12th	N26	2008-2012	Tan Mohd Aminuddin Ishak	BN (UMNO)
12th	N26	2012-2013	Vacant	
13th	N26	2013-2018	Mohamed Arifin Awang Ismail	BN (UMNO)
14th	N26	2018-2020	Mujjibur Rahman Ishak	PAS
14th	N26	2020-2022	Mujjibur Rahman Ishak	PN (PAS)
15th	N26	2022–present	Mujjibur Rahman Ishak	PN (PAS)

== Election results ==
Pahang state election, 2022
Party	Candidate	Votes	%	∆%
PN	Mujjibur Rahman Ishak	8,855	56.61	▲8.69
BN	Saiful Anuar Mokhtar	6,149	39.31	▼4.52
PH	Nor Hisham Mohd Suki	637	4.07	▲4.07
Total valid votes		15,641	100.00	
Total rejected ballots		159		
Unreturned ballots		38		
Turnout		15,838	81.58	▼1.73
Registered electors		19,415		
Majority		2,706	17.30	▲13.21
PN hold		Swing		

Pahang state election, 2018
Party	Candidate	Votes	%	∆%
PAS	Mujibur Rahman Ishak	6,016	47.92	▲7.33
BN	Mohamed Arifin Awang Ismail	5,502	43.83	▼15.58
PKR	Zuliana binti Mohamed	1,035	8.25	▲8.25
Total valid votes		12,553	100.00	
Total rejected ballots		199		
Unreturned ballots		71		
Turnout		12,823	83.31	▼4.13
Registered electors		15,392		
Majority		514	4.09	▼14.72
PAS gain from BN		Swing		-

Pahang state election, 2013
Party	Candidate	Votes	%	∆%
BN	Mohamed Arifin Awang Ismail	7,292	59.41	▼3.09
PAS	Hasenan Haron	4,983	40.59	▲3.09
Total valid votes		12,275	100.00	
Total rejected ballots		250		
Unreturned ballots		78		
Turnout		12,603	87.44	▲4.72
Registered electors		14,413		
Majority		2,309	18.81	▼6.19
BN hold		Swing		

Pahang state election, 2008
Party	Candidate	Votes	%	∆%
BN	Tan Mohd Aminuddin Ishak	6,170	62.50	▼3.23
PAS	Mujibur Rahman Ishak	3,702	37.50	▲3.23
Total valid votes		9,872	100.00	
Total rejected ballots		168		
Unreturned ballots		69		
Turnout		10,109	82.73	▲1.08
Registered electors		12,220		
Majority		2,468	25.00	▼6.45
BN hold		Swing		

Pahang state election, 2004
Party	Candidate	Votes	%	∆%
BN	Tan Mohd Aminuddin Ishak	6,296	65.73	▲9.39
PAS	Aris Hazlan Ismail	3,283	34.27	▼9.39
Total valid votes		9,579	100.00	
Total rejected ballots		179		
Unreturned ballots		58		
Turnout		9,816	81.64	▲3.30
Registered electors		12,023		
Majority		3,013	31.45	▲18.77
BN hold		Swing		

Pahang state election, 1999: Cenur
Party	Candidate	Votes	%	∆%
BN	Tan Mohd Aminuddin Ishak	4,429	56.34	▼14.42
PAS	Mohd Baki Othman	3,432	43.66	▲14.42
Total valid votes		7,861	100.00	
Total rejected ballots		197		
Unreturned ballots		29		
Turnout		8,087	78.35	▼5.58
Registered electors		10,322		
Majority		997	12.68	▼28.85
BN hold		Swing		

Pahang state election, 1995: Cenur
Party	Candidate	Votes	%	∆%
BN	Tan Mohd Aminuddin Ishak	5,093	70.77	▲2.36
PAS	Mohd Baki Othman	2,104	29.23	▼2.36
Total valid votes		7,197	100.00	
Total rejected ballots		177		
Unreturned ballots		23		
Turnout		7,397	83.92	▲7.38
Registered electors		8,814		
Majority		2,989	41.53	▲4.73
BN hold		Swing		

Pahang state election, 1990: Cenur
Party	Candidate	Votes	%	∆%
BN	Tan Mohd Aminuddin Ishak	4,570	68.40	▼6.60
PAS	Mohd Baki Othman	2,111	31.60	▲6.60
Total valid votes		6,681	100.00	
Total rejected ballots		228		
Unreturned ballots		10		
Turnout		6,919	76.55	▲3.93
Registered electors		9,039		
Majority		2,459	36.81	▼13.20
BN hold		Swing		

Pahang state election, 1986: Cenur
Party	Candidate	Votes	%	∆%
BN	Mahmud Mat Taib	4,486	75.00	▲9.29
PAS	Mohd Rosly Hussin	1,495	25.00	▼9.29
Total valid votes		5,981	100.00	
Total rejected ballots		231		
Unreturned ballots		0		
Turnout		6,212	72.61	▼3.87
Registered electors		8,555		
Majority		2,991	50.01	▲18.58
BN hold		Swing		

Pahang state election, 1982
Party	Candidate	Votes	%	∆%
BN	Mahmud Mat Taib	3,262	65.71	▼4.29
PAS	Mohd Alwi Abdul Hamid	1,702	34.29	▲4.29
Total valid votes		4,964	100.00	
Total rejected ballots		146		
Unreturned ballots		0		
Turnout		5,110	76.49	▼0.36
Registered electors		6,681		
Majority		1,560	31.43	▼8.57
BN hold		Swing		

Pahang state election, 1978
Party	Candidate	Votes	%	∆%
BN	Mahmud Mat Taib	3,178	70.00	▲5.16
PAS	Sheikh Hussin Sh Jaafar	1,362	30.00	▲30.00
Total valid votes		4,540	100.00	
Total rejected ballots		202		
Unreturned ballots		0		
Turnout		4,742	76.84	▼1.69
Registered electors		6,171		
Majority		1,816	40.00	▼6.40
BN hold		Swing		

Pahang state election, 1974
Party	Candidate	Votes	%	∆%
BN	Mahmud Mat Taib	2,250	64.84	▲64.84
Independent	Syed Abdul Rahman Syed Mansor	640	18.44	▲18.44
PSRM	Zulkifly Mat Amin (Abu Samah)	580	16.71	▲16.71
Total valid votes		3,470	100.00	
Total rejected ballots		276		
Unreturned ballots		0		
Turnout		3,746	78.53	▲7.25
Registered electors		4,770		
Majority		1,610	46.40	▲35.38
BN hold		Swing		-

Pahang state election, 1969
Party	Candidate	Votes	%	∆%
Alliance	Wan Ahmad Tajuddin Engku Wan Hassan	2,318	52.34	▲2.98
PMIP	Syed Abdul Rahman Syed Mansor	1,830	41.32	▲17.82
Socialist Front	Din Md. Saad	281	6.34	▼5.08
Total valid votes		4,429	100.00	
Total rejected ballots		672		
Unreturned ballots		0		
Turnout		5,101	71.28	▼5.77
Registered electors		7,156		
Majority		488	11.02	▼14.84
Alliance hold		Swing		

Pahang state election, 1964
Party	Candidate	Votes	%	∆%
Alliance	Sallehuddin Awang Pekan	2,109	49.36	▼11.62
PMIP	Abu Samah Ali	1,004	23.50	▼8.13
Independent	Othman Imam Awang	672	15.73	▲15.73
Socialist Front	Mohamed Yaakub	488	11.42	▲4.02
Total valid votes		4,273	100.00	
Total rejected ballots		280		
Unreturned ballots		0		
Turnout		4,553	77.05	▼0.38
Registered electors		5,909		
Majority		1,105	25.86	▼3.49
Alliance hold		Swing		

Pahang state election, 1959
Party	Candidate	Votes	%
Alliance	Wan Abdul Aziz Ungku Abdullah	1,928	60.97
PMIP	Wan Ahmad Wan Mohd. Salleh	1,000	31.63
Socialist Front	Md. Sham Bilal Bar	234	7.40
Total valid votes		3,162	100.00
Total rejected ballots		119	
Unreturned ballots		0	
Turnout		3,281	77.44
Registered electors		4,237	
Majority		928	29.35
This was a new constituency created.
