= 2018 Pahang state election =

Malaysian state legislative election

- 9 May 2018

All 42 seats of the Pahang State Legislative Assembly 22 seats needed for a majority
	Majority party	Minority party	Third party
	BN	PH	GS
Leader	Adnan Yaakob	Fauzi Abdul Rahman	Rosli Abdul Jabar
Party	Barisan Nasional (UMNO)	Pakatan Harapan (PKR)	Gagasan Sejahtera (PAS)
Leader since	1999	30 August 2017	Unknown
Leader's seat	Pelangai	Sungai Lembing (lost seat)	Tanjung Lumpur
Last election	30 seats, 54.09%	9 seats, 22.35% (Pakatan Rakyat)	3 seats, 21.83% (Pakatan Rakyat)
Seats before	29	10	2
Seats won	25	9	8
Seat change	▼4	▼1	▲6
Popular vote	275,766	192,837	192,176
Percentage	41.64%	29.12%	29.02%
Swing	▼12.45%	▲6.77%	▲7.19%
Menteri Besar before election
Adnan Yaakob
Barisan Nasional
Elected Menteri Besar
Wan Rosdy Wan Ismail
Barisan Nasional

The 14th Pahang State election was held on 9 May 2018, concurrently with the 2018 Malaysian general election. The previous state election was held on 5 May 2013. The state assemblymen is elected to 5 years term each.

The Pahang State Legislative Assembly would automatically dissolve on 1 July 2018, the fifth anniversary of the first sitting, and elections must be held within sixty days (two months) of the dissolution (on or before 1 September 2018, with the date to be decided by the Election Commission), unless dissolved prior to that date by the Head of State (Sultan of Pahang) on the advice of the Head of Government (Menteri Besar of Pahang).

Barisan Nasional (BN) continued their government of the state, winning 25 out of 42 seats, reduced from 29 in the 2013 election. Pakatan Harapan won 9 seats, while Pan-Malaysian Islamic Party (PAS) won 8 seats, an increase of 6 seats from the last election.This election also the first time BN has lost it two third majority in Pahang. BN's Wan Rosdy Wan Ismail was sworn in as new Menteri Besar on 11 May 2018, replacing incumbent and 4-term Menteri Besar Adnan Yaakob. The state EXCO members were also sworn in on the same date.

== Contenders ==
Barisan Nasional (BN) is set to contest all 42 seats in Pahang State Legislative Assembly. Barisan Nasional (BN) linchpin party United Malays National Organisation (UMNO) is to set to contest major share of Barisan Nasional (BN) seats.

Pan-Malaysian Islamic Party (PAS) is set to contest all 42 seats in Pahang.

Pakatan Harapan have decided to contest all 42 seats in Pahang. However, Pakatan Harapan has yet to finalize in 1 or 2 seats. On 17 March 2018, Pakatan Harapan has completed the distribution of seats in Pahang. People's Justice Party (PKR) will contest in 14 seats while the National Trust Party (Amanah) will have 11 seats. Malaysian United Indigenous Party (Bersatu) and the Democratic Action Party (DAP) will contest 9 and 8 seats.

Parti Sosialis Malaysia (PSM) will contest in Jelai.

== Party contesting by election symbol ==
- Barisan Nasional (National Front)

Party's Member	Election Symbol
United Malays National Organisation (UMNO)	
Malaysian Chinese Association (MCA)	
Malaysian Indian Congress (MIC)	
Parti Gerakan Rakyat Malaysia (Gerakan)	

- Pakatan Harapan (Alliance Of Hope)

Party's Member	Election Symbol
People's Justice Party (PKR)	
National Trust Party (Amanah)	
Malaysian United Indigenous Party (Bersatu)	
Democratic Action Party (DAP)	

- Gagasan Sejahtera (Ideas of Prosperity)

Party's Member	Election Symbol
Pan-Malaysian Islamic Party (PAS)	

- Socialist Party of Malaysia (Parti Sosialis Malaysia)

== The contested seats ==
- Barisan Nasional (National Front)

Party's Member	Seats
UMNO (31)	Jelai, Padang Tengku, Benta, Batu Talam, Dong, Tahan, Pulau Tawar, Beserah, Tanjung Lumpur, Inderapura, Sungai Lembing, Lepar, Panching, Pulau Manis, Peramu Jaya, Bebar, Chini, Luit, Kuala Sentul, Chenor, Jenderak, Kerdau, Jengka, Lanchang, Kuala Semantan, Pelangai, Guai, Kemayan, Bukit Ibam, Muadzam Shah, Tioman
MCA (8)	Tanah Rata, Cheka, Tras, Damak, Semambu, Teruntum, Mentakab, Bilut
Gerakan (2)	Ketari, Triang
MIC (1)	Sabai

- Pakatan Harapan (Alliance Of Hope)

Party's Member	Seats
PKR (14)	Cheka, Benta, Batu Talam, Damak, Semambu, Teruntum, Inderapura, Sungai Lembing, Panching, Chini, Luit, Kuala Sentul, Lanchang, Kemayan
Amanah (11)	Dong, Pulau Tawar, Beserah, Tanjung Lumpur, Lepar, Kerdau, Jengka, Kuala Semantan, Pelangai, Guai, Tioman
Bersatu (9)	Jelai, Padang Tengku, Tahan, Peramu Jaya, Bebar, Chenor, Jenderak, Bukit Ibam, Muadzam Shah
DAP (8)	Tanah Rata, Tras, Pulau Manis, Mentakab, Bilut, Ketari, Sabai, Triang

- Gagasan Sejahtera (Ideas of Prosperity)

Party's Member	Seats
PAS (41)	Tanah Rata, Jelai, Padang Tengku, Cheka, Benta, Batu Talam, Tras, Dong, Tahan, Damak, Pulau Tawar, Beserah, Semambu, Teruntum, Tanjung Lumpur, Inderapura, Sungai Lembing, Lepar, Panching, Pulau Manis, Peramu Jaya, Bebar, Chini, Luit, Kuala Sentul, Chenor, Jenderak, Kerdau, Jengka, Mentakab, Lanchang, Kuala Semantan, Bilut, Ketari, Sabai, Pelangai, Guai, Kemayan, Bukit Ibam, Muadzam Shah, Tioman

== Election pendulum ==
The 14th General Election witnessed 25 governmental seats and 17 non-governmental seats filled the Pahang State Legislative Assembly. The government side has 2 safe seats and 4 fairly safe seats, while the non-government side has 4 safe seats, but has no fairly safe seat.

2018 Pahang state election

GOVERNMENT SEATS
Marginal
Cheka	Lee Ah Wong	MCA	35.91
Kuala Semantan	Nor Azmi Mat Ludin	UMNO	36.86
Tioman	Mohd. Johari Hussain	UMNO	44.03
Pulau Tawar	Nazri Ngah	UMNO	46.21
Lanchang	Mohd. Sharkar Shamsudin	UMNO	46.84
Sungai Lembing	Md. Sohaimi Mohamed Shah	UMNO	46.90
Benta	Mohd. Soffi Abd. Razak	UMNO	47.12
Lepar	Abd. Rahim Muda	UMNO	47.14
Jelai	Wan Rosdy Wan Ismail	UMNO	47.49
Padang Tengku	Mustapa Hj. Long	UMNO	49.74
Jenderak	Mohamed Jaafar	UMNO	50.55
Pulau Manis	Khairuddin Mahmud	UMNO	50.71
Bukit Ibam	Samsiah Arshad	UMNO	50.95
Inderapura	Shafik Fauzan Sharif	UMNO	51.67
Pelangai	Adnan Yaakob	UMNO	52.40
Guai	Norol Azali Sulaiman	UMNO	52.41
Kerdau	Syed Ibrahim Syed Ahmad	UMNO	53.22
Kuala Sentul	Shahaniza Shamsuddin	UMNO	53.58
Kemayan	Mohd. Fadil Osman	UMNO	54.36
Fairly safe
Muadzam Shah	Ir. Razali Kassim	UMNO	56.39
Dong	Shahiruddin Ab. Moin	UMNO	56.71
Batu Talam	Abd. Aziz Mat Kiram	UMNO	57.85
Peramu Jaya	Sh. Mohamed Puzi Sh. Ali	UMNO	58.62
Safe
Chini	Abu Bakar Harun	UMNO	60.78
Bebar	Fakhruddin Mohd. Ariff	UMNO	70.50

NON-GOVERNMENT SEATS
Marginal
Panching	Mohd. Tarmizi Yahaya	PAS	38.23
Beserah	Andansura Rabu	PAS	38.36
Tanjung Lumpur	Rosli Abdul Jabar	PAS	39.64
Damak	Zuridan Mohd. Daud	PAS	42.59
Luit	Soffian Abd. Jalil	PAS	43.31
Sabai	Kamache Doray Rajoo	DAP	45.06
Tahan	Mohd. Zakhwan Ahmad Badharuddin	PAS	46.40
Semambu	Lee Chean Chung	PKR	47.15
Chenor	Mujjibur Rahman Ishak	PAS	47.92
Jengka	Shahril Azman Abd. Halim	PAS	50.23
Mentakab	Woo Chee Wan	DAP	50.78
Ketari	Syefura Othman	DAP	51.17
Bilut	Lee Chin Chen	DAP	55.68
Safe
Tanah Rata	Chong Yoke Kong	DAP	60.20
Teruntum	Sim Chon Siang	PKR	61.85
Tras	Chow Yu Hui	DAP	68.47
Triang	Leong Yu Man	DAP	70.18

== Results ==
Party or alliance		Votes	%	Seats	+/–
Barisan Nasional	United Malays National Organisation	220,715	33.32	24	–4
Barisan Nasional	Malaysian Chinese Association	40,241	6.08	1	–1
Barisan Nasional	Parti Gerakan Rakyat Malaysia	10,931	1.65	0	0
Barisan Nasional	Malaysian Indian Congress	3,879	0.59	0	0
Barisan Nasional	Total	275,766	41.64	25	–5
Gagasan Sejahtera	Malaysian Islamic Party	192,203	29.02	8	+5
Pakatan Harapan	People's Justice Party	64,338	9.71	2	0
Pakatan Harapan	Democratic Action Party	71,396	10.78	7	0
Pakatan Harapan	National Trust Party	42,381	6.40	0	New
Pakatan Harapan	Malaysian United Indigenous Party	14,722	2.22	0	New
Pakatan Harapan	Total	192,837	29.12	9	0
Socialist Party of Malaysia		229	0.03	0	0
Independents		1,281	0.19	0	0
Total		662,316	100.00	42	0
Valid votes		662,316	97.88		
Invalid/blank votes		14,364	2.12		
Total votes		676,680	100.00		
Registered voters/turnout		823,981	82.12		
Source: SPR, ElectionData.MY

=== Seats that changed allegiance ===
No.	Seat	Previous Party (2013)	Current Party (2018)
N09	(Pahang) Tahan	Barisan Nasional (UMNO)	Gagasan Sejahtera (PAS)
N10	(Pahang) Damak	Barisan Nasional (MCA)	Gagasan Sejahtera (PAS)
N19	(Pahang) Panching	Barisan Nasional (UMNO)	Gagasan Sejahtera (PAS)
N24	(Pahang) Luit	Barisan Nasional (UMNO)	Gagasan Sejahtera (PAS)
N26	(Pahang) Chenor	Barisan Nasional (UMNO)	Gagasan Sejahtera (PAS)
N29	(Pahang) Jengka	Barisan Nasional (UMNO)	Gagasan Sejahtera (PAS)
N32	(Pahang) Kuala Semantan	Gagasan Sejahtera (PAS)	Barisan Nasional (UMNO)
