= Luit (state constituency) =

Political subdivision in Malaysia

Luit (N24)
Pahang constituency

State constituency
- Legislature: Pahang State Legislative Assembly
MLA
Mohd Sofian Abd Jalil
PN
- Constituency created: 1984
- First contested: 1986
- Last contested: 2022

Demographics
- Electors (2022): 16,279

Luit is a state constituency in Pahang, Malaysia, that is represented in the Pahang State Legislative Assembly.

== Demographics ==
Ethnic breakdown of Luit's electorate as of 2022
1. Malay (80.9%)
2. Chinese (12.3%)
3. Other ethnicities (5.22%)
4. Indian (1.50%)

== History ==
=== Polling districts ===
According to the federal gazette issued on 30 October 2022, the Luit constituency is divided into 11 polling districts.

| State constituency | Polling districts | Code | Location |
|---|---|---|---|
| Luit (N24) | Kampung Sri Jaya | 086/24/01 | SJK (C) Pei Min Sri Jaya |
| Luit (N24) | Kampung New Zealand | 086/24/02 | SK LKTP Kampong New Zealand |
| Luit (N24) | Kampung Luit | 086/24/03 | SK Ulu Luit |
| Luit (N24) | Serengkam | 086/24/04 | SK Serengkam |
| Luit (N24) | Kuala Wau | 086/24/05 | SK Kuala Wau |
| Luit (N24) | Lubuk Paku | 086/24/06 | Dewan Mini Kampung Lubuk Paku |
| Luit (N24) | Kampung Senggora | 086/24/07 | SK Senggora |
| Luit (N24) | Sri Keramat | 086/24/08 | SK Sri Keramat |
| Luit (N24) | Bandar Maran | 086/24/09 | SK Maran |
| Luit (N24) | FELDA Bukit Tajau | 086/24/10 | SK LKTP Bukit Tajau |
| Luit (N24) | Kampung Sentosa | 086/24/11 | SK Sentosa |

=== Representation history ===
Members of the Legislative Assembly for Luit
| Assembly | No | Years | Name | Party |
Constituency created from Bandar Maran and Chini
| 7th | N18 | 1986-1990 | Ayub Teh | BN (UMNO) |
| 8th | N18 | 1990-1995 | Ayub Teh | BN (UMNO) |
| 9th | N21 | 1995-1999 | Ayub Teh | BN (UMNO) |
| 10th | N21 | 1999-2004 | Ahmad Munawar Abdul Jalil | BN (UMNO) |
| 11th | N24 | 2004-2008 | Ahmad Munawar Abdul Jalil | BN (UMNO) |
| 12th | N24 | 2008-2013 | Ahmad Munawar Abdul Jalil | BN (UMNO) |
| 13th | N24 | 2013-2018 | Nurhidayah Mohamad Shahaimi | BN (UMNO) |
| 14th | N24 | 2018-2020 | Mohd Sofian Abd Jalil | PAS |
| 14th | N24 | 2020-2022 | Mohd Sofian Abd Jalil | PN (PAS) |
| 15th | N24 | 2022–present | Mohd Sofian Abd Jalil | PN (PAS) |

== Election results ==
Pahang state election, 2022
| Party | Candidate | Votes | % | ∆% |
|---|---|---|---|---|
| PN | Mohd Sofian Abd Jalil | 6,002 | 47.65 | ▲5.01 |
| BN | Jamaluddin Md Marzuki | 4,836 | 38.39 | ▼1.60 |
| PH | Mohd Afandi Abd Rani | 1,584 | 12.58 | ▲12.58 |
| Total valid votes | | 12,422 | 100.00 | |
| Total rejected ballots | | 139 | | |
| Unreturned ballots | | 35 | | |
| Turnout | | 12,596 | 77.38 | ▼3.83 |
| Registered electors | | 16,279 | | |
| Majority | | 1,166 | 9.39 | ▲6.61 |
| PN hold | | Swing | | |

Pahang state election, 2018
| Party | Candidate | Votes | % | ∆% |
|---|---|---|---|---|
| PAS | Mohd Sofian Abd Jalil | 4,238 | 43.31 | ▼3.06 |
| BN | Nurhidayah Mohamad Shahaimi | 3,966 | 40.53 | ▼10.23 |
| PKR | Rosli Amin | 1,582 | 16.17 | ▲16.17 |
| Total valid votes | | 9,786 | 100.00 | |
| Total rejected ballots | | 157 | | |
| Unreturned ballots | | 32 | | |
| Turnout | | 9,975 | 81.20 | ▼2.40 |
| Registered electors | | 12,284 | | |
| Majority | | 272 | 2.78 | ▼1.62 |
| PAS gain from BN | | Swing | | - |

Pahang state election, 2013
| Party | Candidate | Votes | % | ∆% |
|---|---|---|---|---|
| BN | Nurhidayah binti Mohamad Shahaimi | 4,631 | 50.76 | ▼6.78 |
| PAS | Shahrul Nizam Abdul Haliff | 4,230 | 46.37 | ▲3.90 |
| Independent | Khairul Nizam Abdul Majid | 262 | 2.87 | ▲2.87 |
| Total valid votes | | 9,123 | 100.00 | |
| Total rejected ballots | | 212 | | |
| Unreturned ballots | | 34 | | |
| Turnout | | 9,369 | 83.61 | ▲6.71 |
| Registered electors | | 11,206 | | |
| Majority | | 401 | 4.40 | ▼10.68 |
| BN hold | | Swing | | |

Pahang state election, 2008
| Party | Candidate | Votes | % | ∆% |
|---|---|---|---|---|
| BN | Ahmad Munawar Abdul Jalil | 4,076 | 57.54 | ▼8.27 |
| PAS | Azizah Khatib Mat | 3,008 | 42.46 | ▲8.27 |
| Total valid votes | | 7,084 | 100.00 | |
| Total rejected ballots | | 112 | | |
| Unreturned ballots | | 29 | | |
| Turnout | | 7,225 | 76.89 | ▲2.16 |
| Registered electors | | 9,396 | | |
| Majority | | 1,068 | 15.08 | ▼16.53 |
| BN hold | | Swing | | |

Pahang state election, 2004
| Party | Candidate | Votes | % | ∆% |
|---|---|---|---|---|
| BN | Ahmad Munawar Abdul Jalil | 4,451 | 65.80 | ▲7.22 |
| PAS | Mohd Fadzil Abdul Malek | 2,313 | 34.20 | ▼7.22 |
| Total valid votes | | 6,764 | 100.00 | |
| Total rejected ballots | | 153 | | |
| Unreturned ballots | | 36 | | |
| Turnout | | 6,953 | 74.73 | ▲2.55 |
| Registered electors | | 9,304 | | |
| Majority | | 2,138 | 31.61 | ▲14.43 |
| BN hold | | Swing | | |

Pahang state election, 1999
| Party | Candidate | Votes | % | ∆% |
|---|---|---|---|---|
| BN | Ahmad Munawar Abdul Jalil | 3,571 | 58.59 | ▼19.32 |
| PAS | Hashim Yahaya | 2,524 | 41.41 | ▲41.41 |
| Total valid votes | | 6,095 | 100.00 | |
| Total rejected ballots | | 157 | | |
| Unreturned ballots | | 39 | | |
| Turnout | | 6,291 | 72.18 | ▲0.90 |
| Registered electors | | 8,716 | | |
| Majority | | 1,047 | 17.18 | ▼38.64 |
| BN hold | | Swing | | |

Pahang state election, 1995
| Party | Candidate | Votes | % | ∆% |
|---|---|---|---|---|
| BN | Ayub Teh | 4,606 | 77.91 | ▲8.33 |
| S46 | Abu Bakar Othman | 1,306 | 22.09 | ▼8.33 |
| Total valid votes | | 5,912 | 100.00 | |
| Total rejected ballots | | 168 | | |
| Unreturned ballots | | 40 | | |
| Turnout | | 6,120 | 71.28 | ▼5.22 |
| Registered electors | | 8,586 | | |
| Majority | | 3,300 | 55.82 | ▲16.67 |
| BN hold | | Swing | | |

Pahang state election, 1990
| Party | Candidate | Votes | % | ∆% |
|---|---|---|---|---|
| BN | Ayub Teh | 7,389 | 69.58 | ▲2.49 |
| S46 | Mohamed Harun | 3,231 | 30.42 | ▲30.42 |
| Total valid votes | | 10,620 | 100.00 | |
| Total rejected ballots | | 441 | | |
| Unreturned ballots | | 11 | | |
| Turnout | | 11,072 | 76.50 | ▲5.80 |
| Registered electors | | 14,474 | | |
| Majority | | 4,158 | 39.15 | ▼5.92 |
| BN hold | | Swing | | |

Pahang state election, 1986
| Party | Candidate | Votes | % |
|---|---|---|---|
| BN | Ayub Teh | 4,723 | 67.09 |
| DAP | Tan Meng Choo | 1,550 | 22.02 |
| PAS | Nordin Majid | 767 | 10.89 |
| Total valid votes | | 7,040 | 100.00 |
| Total rejected ballots | | 308 | |
| Unreturned ballots | | 0 | |
| Turnout | | 7,348 | 70.69 |
| Registered electors | | 10,394 | |
| Majority | | 3,173 | 45.07 |
This was a new constituency created.
