= Damak (state constituency) =

Political subdivision in Malaysia

Damak (N10)
Pahang constituency

State constituency
- Legislature: Pahang State Legislative Assembly
MLA
Zuridan Mohd Daud
PN
- Constituency created: 1994
- First contested: 1995
- Last contested: 2022

Demographics
- Electors (2022): 34,967

Damak is a state constituency in Pahang, Malaysia, that has been represented in the Pahang State Legislative Assembly.

== Demographics ==
Ethnic breakdown of Damak's electorate as of 2022
1. Malay (61.4%)
2. Chinese (28.8%)
3. Indian (5.13%)
4. Other ethnicities (4.70%)

== History ==
=== Polling districts ===
According to the federal gazette issued on 31 October 2022, the Damak constituency is divided into 20 polling districts.

State constituency	Polling Districts	Code	Location
Damak (N10）	Batu Balai	081/10/01	SJK (C) Batu Balai
Damak (N10）	Kampung Damak	081/10/02	SK Damak
Damak (N10）	Kampung Koi	081/10/03	Dewan Orang Ramai Kg. Koi
Damak (N10）	Kampung Som	081/10/04	Dewan JKKK Kampung Som
Damak (N10）	Kampung Baharu	081/10/05	SK Kampung Baharu
Damak (N10）	Kampung Lata Kasah	081/10/06	Balai Raya Lata Kasah
Damak (N10）	Bandar Jerantut Luar	081/10/07	SK Jerantut
Damak (N10）	Kampung Melayu	081/10/08	SK Bandar Jerantut
Damak (N10）	Bandar Baru	081/10/09	SK Jerantut Jaya
Damak (N10）	Sungai Jan	081/10/10	SJK (C) Sungai Jan
Damak (N10）	Taman Muhibbah	081/10/11	SMK Jerantut
Damak (N10）	Inderapura	081/10/12	SMK Padang Saujana
Damak (N10）	Kampung Temin	081/10/13	SK Temin
Damak (N10）	Kampung Gintong	081/10/14	SK Gintong
Damak (N10）	Kampung Batu Kawah	081/10/15	SK Tebing Tinggi
Damak (N10）	Bukit Dinding	081/10/16	SK Bukit Dinding
Damak (N10）	Tebing Tinggi	081/10/17	Dewan Orang Ramai Kampung Simpang Tebing Tinggi
Damak (N10）	Jeransong	081/10/18	SJK (C) Jeransong
Damak (N10）	Sungai kekok	081/10/19	SK Sungai Kiol
Damak (N10）	Hulu Cheka	081/10/20	SNA Ehyail Maarif Ulu Cheka

=== Representation history ===
Members of the Legislative Assembly for Damak
Assembly	No	Years	Name	Party
Constituency created from Tembeling and Pulau Tawar
9th	N10	1995-1999	Lau Lee (刘震林)	BN (MCA)
10th	N10	1999-2004	Lau Lee (刘震林)	BN (MCA)
11th	N10	2004-2008	Lau Lee (刘震林)	BN (MCA)
12th	N10	2008-2013	Lau Lee (刘震林)	BN (MCA)
13th	N10	2013-2018	Lau Lee (刘震林)	BN (MCA)
14th	N10	2018-2020	Zuridan Mohd Daud	PAS
14th	N10	2020-2022	Zuridan Mohd Daud	PN (PAS)
15th	N10	2022–present	Zuridan Mohd Daud	PN (PAS)

== Election results ==
Pahang state election, 2022
Party	Candidate	Votes	%	∆%
PN	Zuridan Mohd Daud	10,883	41.53	▲41.53
PH	Mohamad Rafly Mohd Satar	8,587	32.77	▲32.77
BN	Muhammad Fasal Jamlus	6,655	25.39	▲3.22
Independent	Izzuddin Ismail	82	0.31	▲0.31
Total valid votes		26,207	100.00	
Total rejected ballots		318		
Unreturned ballots		81		
Turnout		26,606	76.09	▼4.60
Registered electors		34,967		
Majority		2,296	8.76	▲1.44
PN hold		Swing		

Pahang state election, 2018
Party	Candidate	Votes	%	∆%
PAS	Zuridan Mohd Daud	8,444	42.56	▲42.56
PKR	Wong Chun Yuan	6,988	35.24	▲21.97
BN	Lim Chong Ly	4,395	22.17	▼20.89
Total valid votes		19,827	78.9	
Total rejected ballots		402	1.6	
Unreturned ballots		77	0.3	
Turnout		20,306	80.69	▼4.92
Registered electors		25,164		
Majority		1,456	7.32	▲6.98
PAS gain from BN		Swing		?

Pahang state election, 2013
Party	Candidate	Votes	%	∆%
BN	Lau Lee	7,905	43.06	▲2.92
Independent	Koh Boon Heng	7,841	42.72	▲42.72
PKR	Jamaluddin Abd Rahim	2,435	13.27	▼23.28
Independent	Mohd Nor Jaafar	174	0.95	▼0.95
Total valid votes		18,355	100.00	
Total rejected ballots		647		
Unreturned ballots		50		
Turnout		19,052	83.28	▲8.08
Registered electors		22,877		
Majority		64	0.35	▼3.25
BN hold		Swing		

Pahang state election, 2008
Party	Candidate	Votes	%	∆%
BN	Lau Lee	5,674	40.14	▼18.54
PKR	Mohd Nor Jaafar	5,165	36.54	▲36.54
Independent	Koh Boon Heng	3,295	23.31	▲23.31
Total valid votes		14,134	100.00	
Total rejected ballots		408		
Unreturned ballots		55		
Turnout		14,597	75.20	▲1.46
Registered electors		19,412		
Majority		509	3.60	▼13.77
BN hold		Swing		

Pahang state election, 2004
Party	Candidate	Votes	%	∆%
BN	Lau Lee	7,563	58.69	▲3.31
DAP	Woo Chee Wan	5,324	41.31	▲41.31
Total valid votes		12,887	100.00	
Total rejected ballots		623		
Unreturned ballots		38		
Turnout		13,548	73.74	▲1.88
Registered electors		18,373		
Majority		2,239	17.37	▲1.80
BN hold		Swing		

Pahang state election, 1999
Party	Candidate	Votes	%	∆%
BN	Lau Lee	6,583	55.38	▼6.84
PAS	Mohd Zai Mustafa	4,732	39.81	▲39.81
PKR	Ng How Ann	572	4.81	▲4.81
Total valid votes		11,887	100.00	
Total rejected ballots		433		
Unreturned ballots		57		
Turnout		12,377	71.86	▲0.79
Registered electors		17,223		
Majority		1,851	15.57	▼8.87
BN hold		Swing		

Pahang state election, 1995
Party	Candidate	Votes	%
BN	Lau Lee	6,819	62.22
S46	Abd Rahim Yahya	4,140	37.78
Total valid votes		10,959	100.00
Total rejected ballots		348	
Unreturned ballots		110	
Turnout		11,417	71.07
Registered electors		16,064	
Majority		2,679	24.45
This was a new constituency created.
