= Tahan (state constituency) =

Political subdivision in Malaysia

Tahan (N09)
Pahang constituency

State constituency
- Legislature: Pahang State Legislative Assembly
MLA
Mohd Zakhwan Ahmad Badarddin
PN
- Constituency created: 1974
- First contested: 1974
- Last contested: 2022

Demographics
- Electors (2022): 20,895
- Area (km²): 5,813km²

Tahan is a state constituency in Pahang, Malaysia, that is represented in the Pahang State Legislative Assembly.

The state constituency was first contested in 1974 and is mandated to return a single Assemblyman to the Pahang State Legislative Assembly under the first-past-the-post voting system. It is the largest state constituency in Pahang and largest state constituency in Peninsular Malaysia.

== Demographics ==
Ethnic breakdown of Tahan's electorate as of 2022
1. Malay (92.9%)
2. Other ethnicities (5.73%)
3. Chinese (0.71%)
4. Indian (0.68%)

== History ==
=== Polling districts ===
According to the federal gazette issued on 31 October 2022, the Tahan constituency is divided into 17 polling districts.

State constituency	Polling Districts	Code	Location
Tahan (N09）	Kampung Sat	081/09/01	SK Kuala Sat
Tahan (N09）	Kampung Gusai	081/09/02	SK Gusai
Tahan (N09）	Kampung Bantal	081/09/03	SK Ulu Tembeling
Tahan (N09）	Kampung Mat Daling	081/09/04	SK Bukit Mat Daling
Tahan (N09）	Kampung Pagi	081/09/05	SK Kampung Pagi
Tahan (N09）	FELDA Sungai Retang	081/09/06	SK LKTP Sungai Retang
Tahan (N09）	FELDA Padang Piol	081/09/07	SK (FELDA) Padang Piol
Tahan (N09）	Kampung Gajah Mati	081/09/08	Balai Raya Kampung Gajah Mati
Tahan (N09）	Pulau Mansuk	081/09/09	SK Pulau Mansok
Tahan (N09）	Jerantut Feri	081/09/10	SK Pedah
Tahan (N09）	Tanah Rom	081/09/11	SK Tanah Rom
Tahan (N09）	Teh	081/09/12	SK Teh
Tahan (N09）	Kuala Tembeling	081/09/13	SJ Kuala Tembeling
Tahan (N09）	Pasir Durian	081/09/14	SK Pasir Durian
Tahan (N09）	Kampung Chebong	081/09/15	SK Chebong
Tahan (N09）	Kampung Merting	081/09/16	SK Merting
Tahan (N09）	Kuala Tahan	081/09/17	SK Kuala Tahan

=== Representation history ===
Members of the Legislative Assembly for Tahan
Assembly	No	Years	Name	Party
Constituency created from Jerantut and Jelai
4th	N06	1974-1978	Harun Gintong	BN (UMNO)
5th	N06	1978-1982	Harun Jaafar	BN (UMNO)
6th	N06	1982-1986	Armia Abdullah	BN (UMNO)
7th	N09	1986-1990	Ahmad Bazain Mohmud	BN (UMNO)
8th	N09	1990-1995	Ahmad Bazain Mohmud	BN (UMNO)
9th	N09	1995-1999	Rahimah Mohammad Kawi	BN (UMNO)
10th	N09	1999-2004	Abd Malik Yusof	PAS
11th	N09	2004-2008	Ahmad Jaafar	BN (UMNO)
12th	N09	2008-2013	Wan Amizan Wan Abdul Razak	BN (UMNO)
13th	N09	2013-2018	Wan Amizan Wan Abdul Razak	BN (UMNO)
14th	N09	2018-2020	Mohd Zakhwan Ahmad Badarddin	PAS
14th	N09	2020-2022	Mohd Zakhwan Ahmad Badarddin	PN (PAS)
15th	N09	2022–present	Mohd Zakhwan Ahmad Badarddin	PN (PAS)

== Election results ==
Pahang state election, 2022
Party	Candidate	Votes	%	∆%
PN	Mohd Zakhwan Ahmad Badarddin	8,777	53.97	▲53.97
BN	Faezah Ishak	6,763	41.58	▼4.25
PH	Mohd Abd Talib Mohd Tahar	724	4.45	▲3.33
Total valid votes		16,264	100.00	
Total rejected ballots		267		
Unreturned ballots		38		
Turnout		16,569	79.30	▼2.50
Registered electors		20,895		
Majority		2,014	12.39	▲11.82
PN hold		Swing		

Pahang state election, 2018
Party	Candidate	Votes	%	∆%
PAS	Mohd Zakhwan Ahmad Badarddin	5,638	46.40	▼1.22
BN	Wan Amizan Wan Abdul Razak	5,569	45.83	▼8.99
PKR	Nordin Samat	945	7.78	▲7.78
Total valid votes		12,152	100.00	
Total rejected ballots		227		
Unreturned ballots		45		
Turnout		12,424	81.80	▼3.10
Registered electors		15,197		
Majority		69	0.57	▼9.07
PAS gain from BN		Swing		?

Pahang state election, 2013
Party	Candidate	Votes	%	∆%
BN	Wan Amizan Wan Abdul Razak	6,200	54.82	▼2.83
PAS	Mohd Zakhwan Ahmad Badarddin	5,110	45.18	▲2.83
Total valid votes		11,310	100.00	
Total rejected ballots		255		
Unreturned ballots		30		
Turnout		11,595	85.36	▲5.25
Registered electors		13,584		
Majority		1,090	9.64	▼5.67
BN hold		Swing		

Pahang state election, 2008
Party	Candidate	Votes	%	∆%
BN	Wan Amizan Wan Abdul Razak	5,112	57.65	▼1.56
PAS	Nuridah Mohd Salleh	3,755	42.35	▲1.56
Total valid votes		8,867	100.00	
Total rejected ballots		189		
Unreturned ballots		17		
Turnout		9,073	80.11	▲2.04
Registered electors		11,326		
Majority		1,357	15.30	▼3.12
BN hold		Swing		

Pahang state election, 2004
Party	Candidate	Votes	%	∆%
BN	Ahmad Jafaar	4,911	59.21	▲9.91
PAS	Abdul Malik Yusof	3,383	40.79	▼9.91
Total valid votes		8,294	100.00	
Total rejected ballots		170		
Unreturned ballots		14		
Turnout		8,478	78.07	▲3.58
Registered electors		10,860		
Majority		1,528	18.42	▲17.02
BN gain from PAS		Swing		-

Pahang state election, 1999
Party	Candidate	Votes	%	∆%
PAS	Abdul Malik Yusof	3,727	50.70	▲4.20
BN	Abdul Halim Yunan	3,624	49.30	▼4.20
Total valid votes		7,351	100.00	
Total rejected ballots		249		
Unreturned ballots		18		
Turnout		7,618	74.49	▲0.62
Registered electors		10,227		
Majority		103	1.40	▼5.59
PAS gain from BN		Swing		-

Pahang state election, 1995
Party	Candidate	Votes	%	∆%
BN	Rahimah binti Mohammad Kawi	3,612	53.50	▼8.81
PAS	Abdul Malik Yusof	3,140	46.50	▲8.81
Total valid votes		6,752	100.00	
Total rejected ballots		218		
Unreturned ballots		17		
Turnout		6,987	73.87	▼7.66
Registered electors		9,458		
Majority		472	6.99	▼17.62
BN hold		Swing		

Pahang state election, 1990
Party	Candidate	Votes	%	∆%
BN	Ahmad Bazain Mohmud	6,377	62.31	▼7.49
PAS	Abdul Malik Yusof	3,858	37.69	▲7.49
Total valid votes		10,235	100.00	
Total rejected ballots		283		
Unreturned ballots		2		
Turnout		10,520	81.53	▲6.20
Registered electors		12,903		
Majority		2,519	24.61	▼14.98
BN hold		Swing		

Pahang state election, 1986
Party	Candidate	Votes	%	∆%
BN	Ahmad Bazain Mohmud	5,936	69.79	▲3.61
PAS	Raja Puji Tengku Abdul Hamid	2,569	30.21	▼3.61
Total valid votes		8,505	100.00	
Total rejected ballots		288		
Unreturned ballots		0		
Turnout		8,793	75.33	▼4.35
Registered electors		11,673		
Majority		3,367	39.59	▲7.22
BN hold		Swing		

Pahang state election, 1982
Party	Candidate	Votes	%	∆%
BN	Armia Abdullah	6,269	66.18	▲1.57
PAS	Mohamed Sidek Norti	3,203	33.82	▲1.53
Total valid votes		9,472	100.00	
Total rejected ballots		207		
Unreturned ballots		0		
Turnout		9,679	79.68	▲1.92
Registered electors		12,148		
Majority		3,066	32.37	▲0.04
BN hold		Swing		

Pahang state election, 1978
Party	Candidate	Votes	%	∆%
BN	Harun Jaafar	3,855	64.62	▼17.83
PAS	Abdul Wahab Taha	1,926	32.28	▲32.28
Parti Rakyat Malaysia	Wan Ali Akhbar Wan Musa	185	3.10	▼12.18
Total valid votes		5,966	100.00	
Total rejected ballots		464		
Unreturned ballots		0		
Turnout		6,430	77.75	▼0.20
Registered electors		8,270		
Majority		1,929	32.33	▼34.83
BN hold		Swing		

Pahang state election, 1974
Party	Candidate	Votes	%
BN	Harun Jaafar	3,151	82.44
Parti Rakyat Malaysia	Mohd. Noh Choh	584	15.28
Independent	Ibrahim Omar	87	2.28
Total valid votes		3,822	100.00
Total rejected ballots		105	
Unreturned ballots		0	
Turnout		3,927	77.95
Registered electors		5,038	
Majority		2,567	67.16
This was a new constituency created.
