= Pulau Manis =

Political subdivision in Malaysia

Coordinates: 3.569°N 103.0637°E

Pulau Manis (N20)
Pahang constituency

State constituency
- Legislature: Pahang State Legislative Assembly
MLA
Rafiq Khan Ahmad Khan
PN
- Constituency created: 2003
- First contested: 2004
- Last contested: 2022

Demographics
- Electors (2022): 30,113

Pulau Manis is a state constituency in Pahang, Malaysia, that is represented in the Pahang State Legislative Assembly.

== Demographics ==
Ethnic breakdown of Pulau Manis's electorate as of 2022
1. Malay (90.3%)
2. Other ethnicities (6.73%)
3. Chinese (2.26%)
4. Indian (0.70%)

== History ==
=== Polling districts ===
According to the federal gazette issued on 31 October 2022, the Pulau Manis constituency is divided into 11 polling districts.

State constituency	Polling district	Code	Location
Pulau Manis（N20）	Seri Mahkota	085/20/01	SK Wira
Pulau Manis（N20）	Jaya Gading	085/20/02	SK Jaya Gading
Pulau Manis（N20）	Kampung Seri Damai	085/20/03	SMK Seri Damai
Pulau Manis（N20）	Gudang Rasau	085/20/04	SK Mat Kilau
Pulau Manis（N20）	Pulau Rusa	085/20/05	SK Pulau Rusa
Pulau Manis（N20）	Ganchong	085/20/06	SK Ganchong
Pulau Manis（N20）	Pulau Manis	085/20/07	SK Pulau Manis
Pulau Manis（N20）	Lepar	085/20/08	SK Lepar
Pulau Manis（N20）	Pelak	085/20/09	SK Pelak
Pulau Manis（N20）	Seri Makmur	085/21/10	SK Seri Makmur
Pulau Manis（N20）	Belimbing	085/21/11	SK Belimbing

=== Representation history ===
Members of the Legislative Assembly for Pulau Manis
Assembly	No	Years	Name	Party
Constituency created from Penur, Cini and Lepar
11th	N20	2004-2008	Ariff Sabri Abdul Aziz	BN (UMNO)
12th	N20	2008-2013	Khairuddin Mahmud	BN (UMNO)
13th	N20	2013-2018	Khairuddin Mahmud	BN (UMNO)
14th	N20	2018-2022	Khairuddin Mahmud	BN (UMNO)
15th	N20	2022–present	Rafiq Khan Ahmad Khan	PN (PAS)

== Election results ==
Pahang state election, 2022: Pulau Manis
Party	Candidate	Votes	%	∆%
PN	Rafiq Khan Ahmad Khan	13,064	54.21	▲54.21
BN	Khairuddin Mahmud	9,133	37.90	▼12.81
PH	Muhammad Khairil Khalid	1,901	7.89	▲7.89
Total valid votes		24,098	100.00	
Total rejected ballots		276		
Unreturned ballots		53		
Turnout		24,427	81.12	▼0.83
Registered electors		30,113		
Majority		3,931	16.31	▲2.02
PN gain from BN		Swing		?

Pahang state election, 2018: Pulau Manis
Party	Candidate	Votes	%	∆%
BN	Khairuddin Mahmud	8,282	50.71	▼16.92
PAS	Zainuddin Noh	5,948	36.40	▲4.05
PKR	Abu Bakar Lebai Sudin	2,101	12.87	▲12.87
Total valid votes		16,331	100.00	
Total rejected ballots		309		
Unreturned ballots		69		
Turnout		16,709	81.95	▼3.78
Registered electors		20,389		
Majority		2,334	14.29	▼20.97
BN hold		Swing		
Source(s) "Pahang - 14th General Election Malaysia (GE14 / PRU14)". The Star.

Pahang state election, 2013: Pulau Manis
Party	Candidate	Votes	%	∆%
BN	Khairuddin Mahmud	10,733	67.63	▼5.13
PAS	Othman Bakar	5,137	32.37	▲5.13
Total valid votes		15,870	100.00	
Total rejected ballots		211		
Unreturned ballots		77		
Turnout		16,158	85.73	▲0.57
Registered electors		18,848		
Majority		5,596	35.26	▼10.26
BN hold		Swing		

Pahang state election, 2008: Pulau Manis
Party	Candidate	Votes	%	∆%
BN	Khairuddin Mahmud	8,237	72.76	▼0.12
PAS	Othman Bakar	3,084	27.24	▲0.12
Total valid votes		11,321	100.00	
Total rejected ballots		309		
Unreturned ballots		439		
Turnout		12,069	85.15	▲4.17
Registered electors		14,173		
Majority		5,153	45.52	▼0.24
BN hold		Swing		

Pahang state election, 2004: Pulau Manis
Party	Candidate	Votes	%
BN	Mohamad Ariff Sabri Abdul Aziz	7,153	72.88
PAS	Ahiatudin Daud	2,662	27.12
Total valid votes		9,815	100.00
Total rejected ballots		167	
Unreturned ballots		812	
Turnout		10,794	80.98
Registered electors		13,329	
Majority		4,491	45.76
This was a new constituency created.
