= Panching =

Political subdivision in Malaysia

Panching (N19)
Pahang constituency

State constituency
- Legislature: Pahang State Legislative Assembly
MLA
Mohd Tarmizi Yahaya
PN
- Constituency created: 2003
- First contested: 2004
- Last contested: 2022

Demographics
- Electors (2022): 34,886

Panching is a state constituency in Pahang, Malaysia, that is represented in the Pahang State Legislative Assembly.

== Demographics ==
Ethnic breakdown of Panching's electorate as of 2022
1. Malay (85.0%)
2. Chinese (9.98%)
3. Indian (2.51%)
4. Other ethnicities (2.49%)

== History ==
=== Polling districts ===
According to the federal gazette issued on 30 October 2022, the Panching constituency is divided into 8 polling districts.

State constituency	Polling districts	Code	Location
Panching (N19)	Bukit Rangin	084/19/01	SMK Bukit Rangin
Panching (N19)	Kampung Permatang Badak	084/19/02	SK Permatang Badak
Panching (N19)	Pandan Permai	084/19/03	SMK Padang Garuda
Panching (N19)	Taman Tas	084/19/04	SMK Pandan
Panching (N19)	FELDA Sungai Panching Selatan	084/19/05	SK LKTP Sungai Panching Selatan
Panching (N19)	FELDA Sungai Panching Timur	084/19/06	SK LKTP Sungai Panching Timur
Panching (N19)	FELDA Sungai Panching Utara	084/19/07	SK LKTP Sungai Panching Utara
Panching (N19)	Kampung Panching	084/19/08	SK Panching

=== Representation history ===
Members of the Legislative Assembly for Panching
Assembly	No	Years	Name	Party
Constituency created from Penur, Sungai Lembing and Lepar
11th	N19	2004-2008	Abdul Manan Ismail	BN (UMNO)
12th	N19	2008-2013	Mohd Zaili Besar	BN (UMNO)
13th	N19	2013-2018	Mohd Zaili Besar	BN (UMNO)
14th	N19	2018-2020	Mohd Tarmizi Yahaya	PAS
14th	N19	2020-2022	Mohd Tarmizi Yahaya	PN (PAS)
15th	N19	2022–present	Mohd Tarmizi Yahaya	PN (PAS)

== Election results ==
Pahang state election, 2022: Panching
Party	Candidate	Votes	%	∆%
PN	Mohd Tarmizi Yahaya	15,167	54.43	▲54.43
BN	Fauziah Ab Wahab	8,031	28.82	▼8.69
PH	Haslindalina Hashim	4,243	15.23	▲15.23
PEJUANG	Afif Syairol Abdul Rahim	130	0.47	▲0.47
Total valid votes		27,571	100.00	
Total rejected ballots		252		
Unreturned ballots		41		
Turnout		27,864	79.87	▼3.55
Registered electors		34,886		
Majority		7,136	25.61	▲24.89
PN hold		Swing		
Source(s) https://lom.agc.gov.my/ilims/upload/portal/akta/outputp/1753280/PUB%20623%20DUN%20PAHANG.pdf

Pahang state election, 2018: Panching
Party	Candidate	Votes	%	∆%
PAS	Mohd Tarmizi Yahaya	7,143	38.23	▼8.59
BN	Mohd Zaili Besar	7,008	37.51	▼15.67
PKR	Kamaruzaman Mohd Yunus	4,490	24.03	▲24.03
Independent	Benzin Dagok	42	0.22	▲0.22
Total valid votes		18,683	100.00	
Total rejected ballots		255		
Unreturned ballots		103		
Turnout		19,041	83.42	▼2.23
Registered electors		22,824		
Majority		135	0.72	▼5.64
PAS gain from BN		Swing		?
Source(s) https://lom.agc.gov.my/ilims/upload/portal/akta/outputp/pub_20180530_P.U.%20(B)%20328.pdf

Pahang state election, 2013: Panching
Party	Candidate	Votes	%	∆%
BN	Mohd Zaili Besar	8,657	53.18	▼2.72
PAS	Yusof Embong	7,621	46.82	▲2.72
Total valid votes		16,278	100.00	
Total rejected ballots		161		
Unreturned ballots		67		
Turnout		16,506	85.65	▲6.93
Registered electors		19,272		
Majority		1,036	6.36	▼5.44
BN hold		Swing		

Pahang state election, 2008: Panching
Party	Candidate	Votes	%	∆%
BN	Mohd Zaili Besar	6,844	55.90	▼10.67
PAS	Yusof Embong	5,400	44.10	▲44.10
Total valid votes		12,244	100.00	
Total rejected ballots		199		
Unreturned ballots		21		
Turnout		12,464	78.72	▼0.28
Registered electors		15,833		
Majority		1,444	11.80	▼21.34
BN hold		Swing		

Pahang state election, 2004: Panching
Party	Candidate	Votes	%
BN	Abdul Manan Ismail	7,527	66.57
PAS	Yusof Embong	3,780	33.43
Total valid votes		11,307	100.00
Total rejected ballots		149	
Unreturned ballots		31	
Turnout		11,487	79.00
Registered electors		14,540	
Majority		3,747	33.14
This was a new constituency created.
