= Sungai Lembing (state constituency) =

Political subdivision in Malaysia

Sungai Lembing (N17)
Pahang constituency

State constituency
- Legislature: Pahang State Legislative Assembly
MLA
Mohamad Ayub Mat Ashri
PN
- Constituency created: 1974
- First contested: 1974
- Last contested: 2022

Demographics
- Electors (2022): 19,130

Sungai Lembing is a state constituency in Pahang, Malaysia, that is represented in the Pahang State Legislative Assembly.

== Demographics ==
Ethnic breakdown of Sungai Lembing's electorate as of 2022
1. Malay (86.7%)
2. Chinese (9.69%)
3. Other ethnicities (3.34%)
4. Indian (0.26%)

== History ==
=== Polling districts ===
According to the federal gazette issued on 30 October 2022, the Sungai Lembing constituency is divided into 7 polling districts.

State constituency	Polling districts	Code	Location
Sungai Lembing (N17)	Kampung Nadak	084/17/01	SK Nadak
Sungai Lembing (N17)	Pekan Sungai Lembing	084/17/02	SMK Sungai Lembing
Sungai Lembing (N17)	Kuala Kenau	084/17/03	SK Sungai Lembing
Sungai Lembing (N17)	FELDA Bukit Sagu	084/17/04	SK LKTP Bukit Sagu 1; SMK Bukit Sagu
Sungai Lembing (N17)	FELDA Bukit Kuantan	084/17/05	SK LKTP Bukit Kuantan
Sungai Lembing (N17)	FELDA Bukit Goh	084/17/06	SMK Bukit Goh; SK Bukit Goh
Sungai Lembing (N17)	Bukit Kuin	084/17/07	SK Bukit Kuin

=== Representation history ===
Members of the Legislative Assembly for Sungai Lembing
Assembly	No	Years	Name	Party
Constituency created from Ulu Kuantan and Beserah
Sungei Lembing
4th	N12	1974-1978	Wan Abdullah Wan Osman	BN (UMNO)
5th	N12	1978-1982	Wan Abdullah Wan Osman	BN (UMNO)
6th	N12	1982-1986	Wan Abdullah Wan Osman	BN (UMNO)
Sungai Lembing
7th	N12	1986-1990	Wan Abdullah Wan Osman	BN (UMNO)
8th	N12	1990-1995	Ibrahim Mohd Taib	BN (UMNO)
9th	N15	1995-1999	Ibrahim Mohd Taib	BN (UMNO)
10th	N15	1999-2004	Md Sohaimi Mohamed Shah	BN (UMNO)
11th	N17	2004-2008	Md Sohaimi Mohamed Shah	BN (UMNO)
12th	N17	2008-2013	Md Sohaimi Mohamed Shah	BN (UMNO)
13th	N17	2013-2018	Md Sohaimi Mohamed Shah	BN (UMNO)
14th	N17	2018-2022	Md Sohaimi Mohamed Shah	BN (UMNO)
15th	N17	2022–present	Mohamad Ayub Mat Ashri	PN (PAS)

== Election results ==
Pahang state election, 2022
Party	Candidate	Votes	%	∆%
PN	Mohamad Ayub Mat Ashri	6,962	47.38	▲47.38
BN	Umor Arbain Dollah	5,908	40.21	▼6.69
PH	Ahmad Omar	1,738	11.83	▲11.83
PEJUANG	Anuar Mohd Tajuddin	86	0.59	▲0.59
Total valid votes		14,694	100.00	
Total rejected ballots		172		
Unreturned ballots		14		
Turnout		14,880	77.78	▼2.62
Registered electors		19,130		
Majority		1,054	7.17	▼9.81
PN gain from BN		Swing		?

Pahang state election, 2018
Party	Candidate	Votes	%	∆%
BN	Md Sohaimi Mohamed Shah	5,436	46.90	▼14.37
PAS	Mohamad Hazmi Dibok	3,468	29.92	▼8.81
PKR	Fauzi Abdul Rahman	2,687	23.18	▲23.18
Total valid votes		11,591	100.00	
Total rejected ballots		181		
Unreturned ballots		70		
Turnout		11,842	80.40	▼4.63
Registered electors		14,729		
Majority		1,968	16.98	▼5.57
BN hold		Swing		
Source(s) "Pahang - 14th General Election Malaysia (GE14 / PRU14)". The Star.

Pahang state election, 2013
Party	Candidate	Votes	%	∆%
BN	Md. Sohaimi Mohamed Shah	7,042	61.27	▼3.30
PAS	Sulaiman Md Derus	4,451	38.73	▲3.30
Total valid votes		11,493	100.00	
Total rejected ballots		169		
Unreturned ballots		31		
Turnout		11,693	85.03	▲8.23
Registered electors		13,751		
Majority		2,591	22.54	▼6.60
BN hold		Swing		

Pahang state election, 2008
Party	Candidate	Votes	%	∆%
BN	Md. Sohaimi Mohamed Shah	5,913	64.57	▼27.05
PAS	Ishak Ahmad	3,244	35.43	▲27.05
Total valid votes		9,157	100.00	
Total rejected ballots		176		
Unreturned ballots		15		
Turnout		9,348	76.80	▲20.46
Registered electors		12,172		
Majority		2,669	29.15	▼54.10
BN hold		Swing		

Pahang state election, 2004
Party	Candidate	Votes	%	∆%
BN	Md. Sohaimi Mohamed Shah	5,949	91.62	▲34.53
PAS	Idris Ahmad	544	8.38	▼34.53
Total valid votes		6,493	100.00	
Total rejected ballots		145		
Unreturned ballots		4		
Turnout		6,642	56.34	▼18.10
Registered electors		11,790		
Majority		5,405	83.24	▲69.05
BN hold		Swing		

Pahang state election, 1999
Party	Candidate	Votes	%	∆%
BN	Md. Sohaimi Mohamed Shah	5,218	57.10	▼11.18
PAS	Sulaiman Md Derus	3,921	42.90	▲42.90
Total valid votes		9,139	100.00	
Total rejected ballots		253		
Unreturned ballots		14		
Turnout		9,406	74.43	▲0.46
Registered electors		12,637		
Majority		1,297	14.19	▼22.35
BN hold		Swing		

Pahang state election, 1995
Party	Candidate	Votes	%	∆%
BN	Ibrahim Mohd Taib	5,812	68.27	▲9.77
S46	Tunku Iskandar Dzulkarnain Tunku Ismail	2,701	31.73	▼9.77
Total valid votes		8,513	100.00	
Total rejected ballots		256		
Unreturned ballots		38		
Turnout		8,807	73.97	▼2.13
Registered electors		11,906		
Majority		3,111	36.54	▲19.54
BN hold		Swing		

Pahang state election, 1990
Party	Candidate	Votes	%	∆%
BN	Ibrahim Mohd Taib	7,202	58.50	▼12.38
S46	Abdul Aziz Othman	5,109	41.50	▲41.50
Total valid votes		12,311	100.00	
Total rejected ballots		475		
Unreturned ballots		80		
Turnout		12,866	76.10	▲5.93
Registered electors		16,906		
Majority		2,093	17.00	▼38.93
BN hold		Swing		

Pahang state election, 1986
Party	Candidate	Votes	%	∆%
BN	Wan Abdullah Wan Osman	7,007	70.88	▲1.77
DAP	Syed Abdul Kadir Syed Alwi	1,478	14.95	▼1.89
PAS	Bahrin Mohamad	1,401	14.17	▲0.12
Total valid votes		9,886	100.00	
Total rejected ballots		256		
Unreturned ballots		0		
Turnout		10,142	70.18	▼4.42
Registered electors		14,452		
Majority		5,529	55.93	▲3.66
BN hold		Swing		

Pahang state election, 1982
Party	Candidate	Votes	%	∆%
BN	Wan Abdullah Wan Osman	6,250	69.11	▲5.45
DAP	Sheikh Said Sheikh Ahmad	1,523	16.84	▲5.86
PAS	Mohd Tajuddin Taib	1,271	14.05	▲3.97
Total valid votes		9,044	100.00	
Total rejected ballots		175		
Unreturned ballots		0		
Turnout		9,219	74.59	▼4.04
Registered electors		12,359		
Majority		4,727	52.27	▲2.53
BN hold		Swing		

Pahang state election, 1978
Party	Candidate	Votes	%	∆%
BN	Wan Abdullah Wan Osman	5,213	63.66	▼5.03
Parti Rakyat Malaysia	Abdul Malek Mohd	1,140	13.92	▼3.28
DAP	Ismail Mohamad	899	10.98	▲10.98
PAS	A. Latif A. Majid	826	10.09	▲10.09
Independent	Mohd. Zin Omar	111	1.36	▼0.48
Total valid votes		8,189	100.00	
Total rejected ballots		325		
Unreturned ballots		0		
Turnout		8,514	78.64	▲1.50
Registered electors		10,827		
Majority		4,073	49.74	▼1.75
BN hold		Swing		

Pahang state election, 1974
Party	Candidate	Votes	%
BN	Wan Abdullah Wan Osman	4,480	68.69
Parti Rakyat Malaysia	Chian Pang	1,122	17.20
Independent	Chin Jeck Soon	800	12.27
Independent	Mohamed Kameil Ibrahim	120	1.84
Total valid votes		6,522	100.00
Total rejected ballots		425	
Unreturned ballots		0	
Turnout		6,947	77.14
Registered electors		9,006	
Majority		3,358	51.49
This was a new constituency created.
