= Tanjung Lumpur (state constituency) =

Political subdivision in Malaysia

Tanjung Lumpur (N15)
Pahang constituency

State constituency
- Legislature: Pahang State Legislative Assembly
MLA
Rosli Abdul Jabar
PN
- Constituency created: 2003
- First contested: 2004
- Last contested: 2022

Demographics
- Electors (2022): 38,185

Tanjung Lumpur is a state constituency in Pahang, Malaysia, that is represented in the Pahang State Legislative Assembly.

== Demographics ==
Ethnic breakdown of Tanjung Lumpur's electorate as of 2022
1. Malay (83.5%)
2. Chinese (13.0%)
3. Indian (2.08%)
4. Other ethnicities (1.36%)

== History ==
=== Polling districts ===
According to the federal gazette issued on 31 October 2022, the Tanjung Lumpur constituency is divided into 9 polling districts.

State constituency	Polling district	Code	Location
Tanjung Lumpur（N15）	Medan Warisan	083/15/01	SJK (C) Chung Ching
Tanjung Lumpur（N15）	Medan Makmur	083/15/02	SMK Tanah Putih
Tanjung Lumpur（N15）	Seri Kemunting	083/15/03	Dewan Jabatan Pengairan Dan Saliran Daerah Kuantan
Tanjung Lumpur（N15）	Tanjung Lumpur	083/15/04	SK Tanjung Lumpur
Tanjung Lumpur（N15）	Kempadang	083/15/05	SK Kempadang; SJK (C) Pooi Ming
Tanjung Lumpur（N15）	Kampung Peramu	083/15/06	SMK Tanjung Lumpur
Tanjung Lumpur（N15）	Tanah Putih Baru	083/15/07	SK Tanah Putih Baru
Tanjung Lumpur（N15）	Sungai Isap Murni	083/15/08	SK Sungai Isap Murni
Tanjung Lumpur（N15）	Sungai Isap	083/15/09	SK Sungai Isap

=== Representation history ===
Members of the Legislative Assembly for Tanjung Lumpur
Assembly	No	Years	Name	Party
Constituency created from Teruntum and Penur
11th	N15	2004-2008	Nasharudin Zainuddin	BN (UMNO)
12th	N15	2008-2013	Wan Adnan Wan Mamat	BN (UMNO)
13th	N15	2013-2018	Rosli Abdul Jabar	PR (PAS)
14th	N15	2018-2020	Rosli Abdul Jabar	GS (PAS)
14th	N15	2020-2022	Rosli Abdul Jabar	PN (PAS)
15th	N15	2022–present	Rosli Abdul Jabar	PN (PAS)

== Election results ==
Pahang state election, 2022
Party	Candidate	Votes	%	∆%
PN	Rosli Abdul Jabar	16,699	54.98	▲54.98
BN	Nara @ Nikman Nordin	7,710	25.39	▼7.78
PH	Sabrina Md Yusoff	5,796	19.08	▲19.08
PEJUANG	Ab Alim Ruslam Ahmad	167	0.55	▲0.55
Total valid votes		30,372	100.00	
Total rejected ballots		306		
Unreturned ballots		51		
Turnout		30,729	80.47	▼3.51
Registered electors		38,185		
Majority		8,989	29.59	▲23.11
PN hold		Swing		

Pahang state election, 2018
Party	Candidate	Votes	%	∆%
PAS	Rosli Abdul Jabar	8,198	39.64	▼12.65
BN	Tengku Zulkifly Tengku Ahmad	6,859	33.17	▼14.54
PKR	Sabrina Md Yusoff	5,622	27.19	▲27.19
Total valid votes		20,679	100	
Total rejected ballots		316		
Unreturned ballots		102		
Turnout		21,097	83.98	▼2.23
Registered electors		25,120		
Majority		1,339	6.48	▲1.90
PAS hold		Swing		
Source(s) "Pahang - 14th General Election Malaysia (GE14 / PRU14)". The Star.

Pahang state election, 2013
Party	Candidate	Votes	%	∆%
PAS	Rosli Abdul Jabar	9,090	52.29	▲4.28
BN	T.Zulkifly T.Ahmad	8,294	47.71	▼4.28
Total valid votes		17,384	100.00	
Total rejected ballots		235		
Unreturned ballots		50		
Turnout		17,669	86.22	▲9.05
Registered electors		20,493		
Majority		796	4.58	▲0.60
PAS gain from BN		Swing		-

Pahang state election, 2008
Party	Candidate	Votes	%	∆%
BN	Wan Adnan Wan Mamat	6,478	51.99	▼14.21
PAS	Rosli Abdul Jabar	5,982	48.01	▲14.21
Total valid votes		12,460	100.00	
Total rejected ballots		203		
Unreturned ballots		33		
Turnout		12,696	77.17	▼0.58
Registered electors		16,453		
Majority		496	3.98	▼28.42
BN hold		Swing		

Pahang state election, 2004
Party	Candidate	Votes	%
BN	Nasharuddin Zainuddin	7,780	66.20
PAS	Bahrin Mohamad	3,972	33.80
Total valid votes		11,752	100.00
Total rejected ballots		147	
Unreturned ballots		35	
Turnout		11,934	77.74
Registered electors		15,351	
Majority		3,808	32.40
This was a new constituency created.
