= Inderapura (state constituency) =

Political subdivision in Malaysia

Inderapura (N16)
Pahang constituency

State constituency
- Legislature: Pahang State Legislative Assembly
MLA
Shafik Fauzan Sharif
BN
- Constituency created: 2003
- First contested: 2004
- Last contested: 2022

Demographics
- Electors (2022): 18,558

Inderapura is a state constituency in Pahang, Malaysia, that is represented in the Pahang State Legislative Assembly.

== Demographics ==
Ethnic breakdown of Inderapura's electorate as of 2022
1. Malay (92.6%)
2. Chinese (4.38%)
3. Other ethnicities (2.07%)
4. Indian (0.97%)

== History ==
=== Polling districts ===
According to the federal gazette issued on 31 October 2022, the Inderapura constituency is divided into 6 polling districts.

State constituency	Polling district	Code	Location
Inderapura（N16）	Kampung Belukar	083/16/01	SK Kampung Belukar; Dewan PM Najib
Inderapura（N16）	Kuala Penor	083/16/02	SK Kuala Penor
Inderapura（N16）	Cherok Paloh	083/16/03	SK Cherok Paloh
Inderapura（N16）	Ubai	083/16/04	SK Ubai
Inderapura（N16）	Kampung Pahang	083/16/05	Pusat Latihan Pertanian Inderapura; SK Bunut Rendang
Inderapura（N16）	Taman Guru	083/16/06	SMK Paya Besar; Kolej Poly-Tech MARA (KPTM) Kuantan

=== Representation history ===
Members of the Legislative Assembly for Inderapura
Assembly	No	Years	Name	Party
Constituency split from Penur
11th	N16	2004-2008	Shafik Fauzan Sharif	BN (UMNO)
12th	N16	2008-2013	Shafik Fauzan Sharif	BN (UMNO)
13th	N16	2013-2018	Shafik Fauzan Sharif	BN (UMNO)
14th	N16	2018-2022	Shafik Fauzan Sharif	BN (UMNO)
15th	N16	2022–present	Shafik Fauzan Sharif	BN (UMNO)

== Election results ==
Pahang state election, 2022
Party	Candidate	Votes	%	∆%
BN	Shafik Fauzan Sharif	7,029	46.15	▼5.52
PN	Mohd Hafizal Mohamed Shah	6,107	40.10	▲40.10
PH	Fakhrul Anuar Zulkawi	2,030	13.33	▲13.33
PEJUANG	Norashikin Ismail	64	0.42	▲0.42
Total valid votes		15,230	100.00	
Total rejected ballots		159		
Unreturned ballots		19		
Turnout		15,408	83.03	▼3.12
Registered electors		18,558		
Majority		922	6.05	▼14.04
BN hold		Swing		

Pahang state election, 2018
Party	Candidate	Votes	%	∆%
BN	Shafik Fauzan Sharif	5,568	51.67	▼8.74
PAS	Wan Maseri Wan Mohd	3,403	31.58	▼8.02
PKR	Fakhrul Anuar Zulkawi	1,806	16.76	▲16.76
Total valid votes		10,777	100.00	
Total rejected ballots		225		
Unreturned ballots		51		
Turnout		11,053	86.15	▼2.72
Registered electors		12,830		
Majority		2,165	20.09	▼0.72
BN hold		Swing		
Source(s) "Pahang - 14th General Election Malaysia (GE14 / PRU14)". The Star.

Pahang state election, 2013
Party	Candidate	Votes	%	∆%
BN	Shaik Fauzan Sharif	5,644	60.40	▲3.90
PAS	Syed Mohamad Anis Syed Husain	3,700	39.60	▼3.90
Total valid votes		9,344	100.00	
Total rejected ballots		113		
Unreturned ballots		42		
Turnout		9,499	88.87	▲9.10
Registered electors		10,689		
Majority		1,944	20.80	▲7.79
BN hold		Swing		

Pahang state election, 2008
Party	Candidate	Votes	%	∆%
BN	Shaik Fauzan Sharif	3,791	56.51	▼3.06
PAS	Syed Abdul Rahman Syed Hussain	2,918	43.49	▲3.06
Total valid votes		6,709	100.00	
Total rejected ballots		97		
Unreturned ballots		14		
Turnout		6,820	79.77	▲0.22
Registered electors		8,550		
Majority		873	13.01	▼6.12
BN hold		Swing		

Pahang state election, 2004
Party	Candidate	Votes	%
BN	Shaik Fauzan Sharif	3,634	59.56
PAS	Abdul Aziz Long	2,467	40.44
Total valid votes		6,101	100.00
Total rejected ballots		86	
Unreturned ballots		58	
Turnout		6,245	79.54
Registered electors		7,851	
Majority		1,167	19.13
This was a new constituency created.
