= Pahang State Executive Council =

Executive branch of the Pahang state government

- 2022–present
- Date formed: 28 November 2022

People and organisations
- Head of state: Al-Sultan Abdullah Ri'ayatuddin Al-Mustafa Billah Shah Al-Marhum Sultan Ahmad Shah Al-Musta'in Billah
- Head of government: Wan Rosdy Wan Ismail (BN–UMNO)
- Total no. of members: 11
- Member parties: BN and PH coalition government: Barisan Nasional (BN); United Malays National Organisation (UMNO); Pakatan Harapan (PH); Democratic Action Party (DAP); People's Justice Party (PKR)
- Status in legislature: Coalition government
- Opposition parties: Perikatan Nasional (PN); Malaysian United Indigenous Party (BERSATU); Malaysian Islamic Party (PAS)
- Opposition leader: Tuan Ibrahim Tuan Man (PN–PAS)

History
- Legislature term: 15th Malaysian Parliament
- Predecessor: Wan Rosdy I

The Pahang State Executive Council is the executive authority of the Government of Pahang, Malaysia. The Council is composed of the Menteri Besar, appointed by the Sultan on the basis that he is able to command a majority in the Pahang State Legislative Assembly, a number of members made up of members of the Assembly, the State Secretary, the State Legal Adviser and the State Financial Officer.

This Council is similar in structure and role to the Cabinet of Malaysia, while being smaller in size. As federal and state responsibilities differ, there are a number of portfolios that differ between the federal and state governments.

Members of the Council are selected by the Menteri Besar, appointed by the Sultan. The Council has no ministry, but instead a number of committees; each committee will take care of certain state affairs, activities and departments. Members of the Council are always the chair of a committee.

== Lists of full members ==
=== Wan Rosdy II EXCO (since 2022) ===
BN (9)	PH (2)
UMNO (9)	DAP (1); PKR (1)

Members since 28 November 2022 have been :

Name	Portfolio (Note: Announced by Wan Rosdy on 14 December 2022, 12 days after the members took offices on 22 November 2022.) (Note: Reshuffle portfolios announced by Wan Rosdy on 14 February 2024, 1 day after Amizar took office on 13 February 2024.)	Party	Constituency	Term start	Term end
Wan Rosdy Wan Ismail (Menteri Besar)	Finance; Land; Natural Resources, Energy and Water; Economy; Commodities; Farming	BN (UMNO)	Jelai	28 November 2022	Incumbent
Mohd Soffi Abd Razak	Plantation; Agro-based Industry; Biotechonology; Education	BN (UMNO)	Benta	2 December 2022	Incumbent
Syed Ibrahim Syed Ahmad	Islam Affairs; Rural Development; Indigenous Affairs	BN (UMNO)	Kerdau	2 December 2022	Incumbent
Mohammad Fakhruddin Mohd Ariff	Works; Public Transport; Health; Environment	BN (UMNO)	Bebar	2 December 2022	14 February 2024
Mohammad Fakhruddin Mohd Ariff	Housing; Local Government; Green Technology	BN (UMNO)	Bebar	14 February 2024	Incumbent
Razali Kassim	FELDA Affairs; Cooperative; Entrepreneur Development	BN (UMNO)	Muadzam Shah	2 December 2022	14 February 2024
Razali Kassim	Works; Public Transport; Health; Environment	BN (UMNO)	Muadzam Shah	14 February 2024	Incumbent
Nizar Najib	Investment; Industry	BN (UMNO)	Peramu Jaya	2 December 2022	Incumbent
Sabariah Saidan	Public Welfare; Women and Family development	BN (UMNO)	Guai	2 December 2022	Incumbent
Fadzli Mohamad Kamal	Communication and Multimedia; Youth and Sports; NGO Affairs	BN (UMNO)	Dong	2 December 2022	Incumbent
Johari Harun	Housing; Local Government; Environment; Green Technology	BN (UMNO)	Pelangai	2 December 2022	17 August 2023
Amizar Abu Adam	FELDA Affairs; Cooperative; Entrepreneur Development	BN (UMNO)	Pelangai	13 February 2024	Incumbent
Leong Yu Man	Unity; Tourism and Culture	PH (DAP)	Triang	2 December 2022	Incumbent
Sim Chon Siang	Consumer Affairs; Human Resources	PH (PKR)	Teruntum	2 December 2022	Incumbent

=== Wan Rosdy I EXCO (2018–2022) ===
BN (11)
- UMNO (11)

Members from 15 May 2018 to 28 November 2022 were :

Name	Portfolio	Party	Constituency	Term start	Term end
Wan Rosdy Wan Ismail (Menteri Besar)	Planning; Finance; Land and Natural Resources; Investment, Industry and Economy	UMNO	Jelai	15 May 2018	28 November 2022
Mohd Sharkar Shamsudin	Tourism; Environment; Plantation; Biotechnology	UMNO	Lanchang	15 May 2018	28 November 2022
Shahaniza Shamsuddin	Culture; Unity; Community Welfare; Women and Family Development	UMNO	Kuala Sentul	15 May 2018	28 November 2022
Syed Ibrahim Syed Ahmad	Islamic Affairs; Education; Health	UMNO	Kerdau	15 May 2018	28 November 2022
Norol Azali Sulaiman	Basic Facilities; Public Delivery System; Innovation	UMNO	Guai	15 May 2018	28 November 2022
Mohd Johari Hussain	Human Resources; Youth and Sports; Non-governmental Organisations	UMNO	Tioman	15 May 2018	28 November 2022
Mohd. Fakhruddin Mohd. Arif	Science; Green Technology; Communication and Multimedia	UMNO	Bebar	15 May 2018	28 November 2022
Nazri Ngah	FELDA Affairs; Cooperatives; Entrepreneurship; Consumer Affairs	UMNO	Pulau Tawar	15 May 2018	28 November 2022
Abdul Rahim Muda	Local Government; Housing	UMNO	Lepar	15 May 2018	28 November 2022
Mohd. Soffi Abd. Razak	Agriculture and Agro-based Industry	UMNO	Benta	5 June 2018	28 November 2022
Abd. Aziz Mat Kiram	Rural Development; Aboriginal Affairs	UMNO	Batu Talam	5 June 2018	28 November 2022

=== Adnan Yaakob V EXCO (2013–2018) ===
BN (11)
- UMNO (11)

Members from 2013 to 2018 were :

Name	Portfolio	Party	Constituency	Term start	Term end
Adnan Yaakob (Menteri Besar)	Islamic Religious Affairs and Education; Investment and Industry; Orang Asli Affairs and Social Welfare; Non-Governmental Organisation; Planning, Finance, Land, Forestry and Public Delivery System; Unity	UMNO	Pelangai	2013	2018
Mohd Sharkar Shamsudin	Culture; Tourism	UMNO	Lanchang	16 May 2013	14 May 2018
Mohd Soffi Abd Razak	Basic Facilities; Environment	UMNO	Benta	16 May 2013	14 May 2018
Wan Rosdy Wan Ismail	Housing; Municipalities	UMNO	Jelai	16 May 2013	14 May 2018
Shafik Fauzan Sharif	Rural Development; Agriculture and Agro-Based Industry	UMNO	Inderapura	16 May 2013	14 May 2018
Shahiruddin Ab Moin	Cooperatives; Entrepreneurship; Consumerism	UMNO	Dong	16 May 2013	14 May 2018
Abu Bakar Harun	Felda Affairs	UMNO	Chini	16 May 2013	14 May 2018
Mohd Johari Hussain	Youth and Sports	UMNO	Tioman	16 May 2013	14 May 2018
Norol Azali Sulaiman	Health; Human Resources; Special Duties	UMNO	Guai	16 May 2013	14 May 2018
Shahaniza Shamsuddin	Women and Family Development; Communication; Multimedia	UMNO	Kuala Sentul	16 May 2013	14 May 2018
Syed Ibrahim Syed Ahmad	Islamic Dakwah; Special Tasks	UMNO	Kerdau	16 May 2013	14 May 2018

=== Ex officio members ===
Position	Office bearer
State Secretary	Muhammad Safian Ismail
State Legal Advisor	Shamsulbahri Ibrahim
State Financial Officer	Mohamad Roslan Harun

== See also ==
- Sultan of Pahang
- Menteri Besar of Pahang
- Pahang State Legislative Assembly
