= Norol Azali Sulaiman =

Malaysian politician

Yang Hormat Dato' Sri Norol Azali Sulaiman SSAP DIMP
- نورالازلي سليمان

Member of the Pahang State Executive Council
- In office 2018 – 2022 (Basic Amenities, Public Delivery System and Innovation)
- Monarchs: Ahmad Shah; Abdullah
- Preceded by: Mohd Soffi Abd Razak (Basic Amenities); Adnan Yaakob (Public Delivery System); Portfolio established (Innovation)
- Succeeded by: Portfolio abolished (Basic Amenities, Public Delivery System and Innovation)
- Constituency: Guai
- In office 2013 – 2018 (Health, Human Resources and Special Tasks)
- Monarch: Ahmad Shah
- Succeeded by: Syed Ibrahim Syed Ahmad (Health); Mohd Johari Hussain (Human Resources); Portfolio abolished (Special Tasks)
- Constituency: Guai

Member of the Pahang State Legislative Assembly for Guai
- In office 8 March 2008 – 19 November 2022
- Preceded by: Hamzah Ibrahim (BN–UMNO)
- Succeeded by: Sabariah Saidan (BN–UMNO)
- Majority: 1,941 (2008); 2,298 (2013); 3,295 (2018)

Faction represented in Pahang State Legislative Assembly
- 2008–2022: Barisan Nasional

Personal details
- Born: 2 January 1972 (age 54) Pahang, Malaysia
- Citizenship: Malaysian
- Party: United Malays National Organisation (UMNO)
- Other political affiliations: Barisan Nasional (BN); Perikatan Nasional (PN); Muafakat Nasional (MN)
- Occupation: Politician

Norol Azali bin Sulaiman is a Malaysian politician and has served as Pahang State Executive Councillor.

== Election results ==
Pahang State Legislative Assembly
Year	Constituency	Candidate	Votes	Pct	Opponent(s)	Votes	Pct	Ballots cast	Majority	Turnout
2008	N37 Guai	Norolazali Sulaiman (UMNO)	6,780	58.35%	Musaniff Ab. Rahman (PAS)	4,839	41.65%	11,804	1,941	79.32%
2013	N37 Guai	Norolazali Sulaiman (UMNO)	8,320	58.42%	Musaniff Ab. Rahman (PAS)	5,922	41.58%	14,426	2,298	85.10%
2018	N37 Guai	Norolazali Sulaiman (UMNO)	8,147	52.41%	Mohd Shahrul Mohamed (PAS)	4,852	31.21%	15,904	3,295	82.20%
2018	N37 Guai	Norolazali Sulaiman (UMNO)	8,147	52.41%	Ahmad Majdil Fauzi Abd Aziz (AMANAH)	2,547	16.38%	15,904	3,295	82.20%

== Honours ==
- Pahang
  - Grand Knight of the Order of Sultan Ahmad Shah of Pahang (SSAP) – Dato' Sri (2017)
  - Knight Companion of the Order of the Crown of Pahang (DIMP) – Dato' (2013)
