= UMNO =

National political party in Malaysia

United Malays National Organisation Pertubuhan Kebangsaan Melayu Bersatu
- Abbreviation: UMNO (أمنو); PEKEMBAR (ڤکمبر)
- President: Ahmad Zahid Hamidi
- Chairperson: Badruddin Amiruldin
- Secretary-General: Asyraf Wajdi Dusuki
- Deputy President: Mohamad Hasan
- Vice Presidents: Wan Rosdy Wan Ismail; Mohamed Khaled Nordin; Johari Abdul Ghani
- Women's Chief: Noraini Ahmad
- Youth Chief: Muhamad Akmal Saleh (Pemuda); Nurul Amal Mohd Fauzi (Puteri)
- Treasurer: Tengku Adnan Tengku Mansor
- Founder: Onn Jaafar
- Founded: 11 May 1946; 80 years ago (as UMNO); 13 February 1988; 38 years ago (as UMNO Baru)
- Preceded by: United Malays Organisation; USNO (in Sabah); BERJAYA (in Sabah)
- Succeeded by: Singapore Malay National Organisation (Singapore)
- Headquarters: Tingkat 38, Menara Dato’ Onn, Putra World Trade Centre, Jalan Tun Ismail, 50480 Kuala Lumpur
- Newspaper: New Straits Times (Note: Belongs to the same parent company as Berita Harian and Harian Metro.); Berita Harian (Note: In September 1972, the investment arm of UMNO, named Fleet Holdings (which was headed by Junus Sudin), bought out the Malaysian operations unit of The Straits Times Press Group (a forerunner of SPH Media), which included Berita Harian. The purchased publications were placed under the management of the New Straits Times Press, which is also the name of its main publication); Harian Metro (Note: Belongs to the same parent company as the New Straits Times and Berita Harian.)
- Youth wing: Pergerakan Pemuda UMNO
- Women's wing: Wanita UMNO
- Women's youth wing: Pergerakan Puteri UMNO
- Student wing: Kelab Mahasiswa UMNO
- Membership (2026): ▲3,525,000
- Ideology: Ketuanan Melayu; Malay nationalism; National conservatism; Social conservatism
- Political position: Right-wing
- Religion: Sunni Islam
- National affiliation: Barisan Nasional (since 1973) (Note: The party was formerly part of the Alliance (1952–1973), United Alliance of Sabah (2018–2020), Muafakat Nasional (2019–2022), and Gabungan Rakyat Sabah (2020–2022). Through BN it is aligned with Perikatan Nasional (2020–2022), Gabungan Rakyat Sabah (since 2025), and Gabungan Parti Sarawak (since 2018)); National Unity Government (since 2022)
- Colours: Red White
- Slogan: Bersatu, Bersetia, Berkhidmat (United, Loyal, In Service)
- Anthem: Bersatu, Bersetia, Berkhidmat
- Dewan Negara: 8 / 70
- Dewan Rakyat: 26 / 222
- Dewan Undangan Negeri: 106 / 612
- Chief Minister of states: 5 / 13

Election symbol
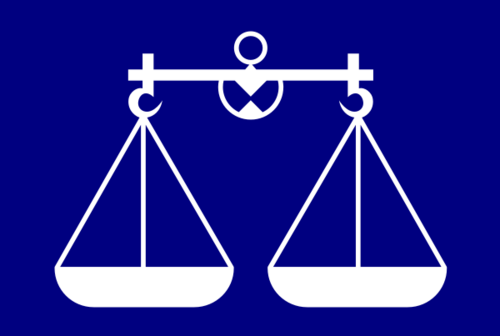

Sang Saka Bangsa

Website
- www.umno.org.my umno-online.my
- Politics of Malaysia; Political parties; Elections; 1. Red and white have been used since before independence.

The United Malays National Organisation (UMNO; Malay: Pertubuhan Kebangsaan Melayu Bersatu, PEKEMBAR) is a conservative and Malay nationalist political party in Malaysia. Founded in 1946 by Onn Jaafar, it is the oldest national political party in the country and has been described as Malaysia's "Grand Old Party". UMNO is a founding and principal member of the Barisan Nasional (BN) coalition, which, together with its predecessor the Alliance Party, governed Malaysia from the independence of Malaya in 1957 until its defeat in the 2018 general election. During this period, every Prime Minister of Malaysia also served as the President of UMNO.

Following the 2018 election, UMNO retained considerable influence in Malaysian politics. It returned to power twice during the 2020–2022 Malaysian political crisis, first as part of a Perikatan Nasional (PN)–led government and later as the leading party in a BN-led administration. In the latter, UMNO Vice President Ismail Sabri Yaakob served as Prime Minister from 2021 to 2022. Since 2022, the party's president, Ahmad Zahid Hamidi, has served as Deputy Prime Minister of Malaysia in a Pakatan Harapan (PH)–led government. Despite changes in coalition alignments, UMNO continues to play a significant role in shaping national policy and political discourse.

An ethnically based party advocating for Malay interests, UMNO's constitution states its objectives as the promotion of Malay nationalism, the concept of Ketuanan Melayu (lit. Malay Overlordship or Malay Supremacy), the preservation of the "dignity" of the Malay people, the recognition of Islam as the religion of the federation and the "protection of Malay culture" as the core national culture of the country. The party also declares as a goal the defence and expansion of Islam within Malaysia. These aims are rooted in the party's longstanding position as the principal vehicle for Malay political representation at the national level.

== History ==
After the British returned to Malaya in the aftermath of World War II, the Malayan Union was formed. However, the Union was met with much opposition due to its constitutional framework, which allegedly threatened Malay sovereignty over Malaya.

The first phase of the journey of the UMNO party was the result of a combination of 41 Malay associations in the Malay Peninsula at that time led by Ahmad Boestamam who presented a memorandum to Sultan Ismail ibni Sultan Ibrahim who became the Sultan of Johor at that time to reject the Malayan Union proposal brought by the British.

In the second phase, a series of Malay congresses were held, culminating in the formation of the nationalist party, UMNO on 10 May 1946 at the Third Malay Congress in Johor Bahru, with Onn Jaafar as its leader. UMNO strongly opposed the Malayan Union, but originally did not seek political power. UMNO had no choice but continue playing a supporting role to the British colonial administration. The British cooperated with UMNO leaders and helped to defeat the communist insurgency.

In 1949, after the Malayan Union had been replaced by the semi-autonomous Federation of Malaya, UMNO shifted its focus to politics and governance. According to at least one official school textbook published during UMNO's time in government, the party fought for other races once they were at the helm of the country.

In 1951, Onn Jaafar left UMNO after failing to open its membership to non-Malay Malayans to form the Independence of Malaya Party. Tunku Abdul Rahman replaced Onn as UMNO President. In the following year, the Kuala Lumpur branch of UMNO formed an ad hoc and temporary electoral pact with the Selangor branch of Malayan Chinese Association to avoid contesting the same seats in the Kuala Lumpur municipal council elections. UMNO and MCA eventually carried nine out of the twelve seats, dealing a crushing blow to the IMP. After several other successes in local council elections, the coalition was formalised as an "Alliance" in 1954.

In 1954, state elections were held. In these elections, the Alliance won 226 of the 268 seats nationwide. In the same year, a Federal Legislative Council was formed, comprising 100 seats. 52 would be elected, and the rest would be appointed by the British High Commissioner. The Alliance demanded that 60 of the seats be elected, but despite the Tunku flying out to London to negotiate, the British held firm. Elections for the council were held in 1955, and the Alliance, which had now expanded to include the Malayan Indian Congress, issued a manifesto stating its goals of achieving independence by 1959, requiring a minimum of primary school education for all children, protecting the rights of the Malay rulers as constitutional monarchs, ending the Communist emergency, and reforming the civil service through the hiring of more Malayans as opposed to foreigners.

When the results were released, it emerged that the Alliance had won 51 of the 52 seats contested, with the other seat going to PAS (the Pan-Malayan Islamic Party, a group of Islamists that split from UMNO). The Tunku became the first Chief Minister of Malaya.

Throughout this period, the Malayan Emergency had been on-going. The Malayan National Liberation Army (MNLA), the armed wing of the Malayan Communist Party (MCP), committed sabotage campaigns against the British by disrupting transportation and communication networks, attacking police stations, burning down factories, with the goal of gaining independence for Malaya by making British rule in Malaya too expensive to maintain. The colonial government declared the MCP, along with several left-wing political groups, illegal in 1948. In 1955, the Alliance government together with the British High Commissioner declared an amnesty for the communist insurgents who surrendered. Representatives from the Alliance government also met with leaders of the MCP in an attempt to resolve the conflict peacefully, as their manifesto in the election stated. Chin Peng, the MCP Secretary-General, insisted that the MCP be allowed to contest elections and be declared a legal political party as a pre-condition to laying down arms. However, the Tunku rejected this, leading to an impasse.

In 1956, the Tunku led a group of negotiators, comprising Alliance politicians and representatives of the Malay rulers, to London. There, they brokered a deal with the British government for independence. The date of independence was set as 31 August 1957 on the condition that an independent commission is set up to draft a constitution for the country. The Alliance government was also required to avoid seizing British and other foreign assets in Malaya. A defence treaty would also be signed.

The Reid Commission, led by Lord Reid, was formed to draft the constitution. Although enshrining concepts such as federalism and a constitutional monarchy, the proposed constitution also contained provisions protecting special rights for the Malays, such as quotas in admission to higher education and the civil service, and making Islam the official religion of the federation. It also made Malay the official language of the nation, although the right to vernacular education in Chinese and Tamil would be protected. Although the Tunku and the Malay rulers had asked the Reid Commission to ensure that "in an independent Malaya all nationals should be accorded equal rights, privileges and opportunities and there must not be discrimination on grounds of race and creed," the Malay privileges, which many in UMNO backed, were cited as necessary by the Reid Commission as a form of affirmative action that would eventually be phased out. These measures were included as Articles 3, 152 and 153 of the Constitution.

Independence was declared by the Tunku in Merdeka Stadium on 31 August 1957, marking a transition into a new era of Malayan and Malaysian politics.

=== Independence ===
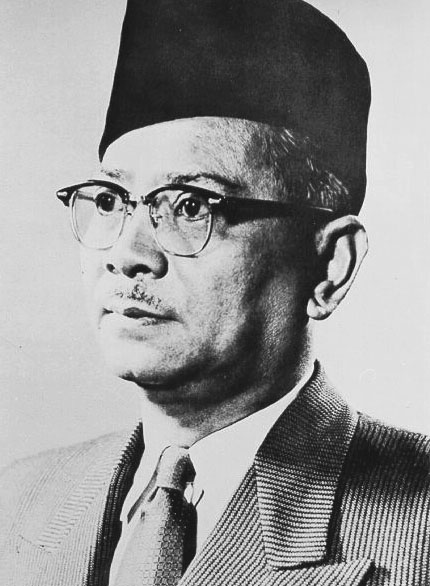
Tunku Abdul Rahman, first Prime Minister of Malaya

In Malaya's first general elections in 1959, the Alliance coalition led by UMNO won 51.8% of the votes and captured 74 out of 104 seats, enough for a two-thirds majority in parliament, which would not only allow them to form the government again but amend the constitution at will. However, for the Alliance, the election was marred by internal strife when MCA leader Lim Chong Eu demanded his party be allowed to contest 40 of the 104 seats available. When the Tunku rejected this, many of Lim's supporters resigned, and ran in the election as independents, which cost the Alliance some seats.

In 1961, the Tunku mooted the idea of forming a federation named "Malaysia", which would consist of the British colonies of Singapore, Sabah, Sarawak, and also the British Protectorate of Brunei. The reasoning behind this was that this would allow the federal government to control and combat communist activities, especially in Singapore. It was also feared that if Singapore achieved independence, it would become a base for Chinese chauvinists to threaten Malayan sovereignty. To balance out the ethnic composition of the new nation, the other states, whose Malay and indigenous populations would balance out the Singaporean Chinese majority, were also included.

After much negotiation, a constitution was hammered out with some minor changes. For instance, the Malay privileges were now made available to all "Bumiputra", a group comprising the Malays and other indigenous peoples of Malaysia. However, the new states were also granted some autonomy unavailable to the original nine states of Malaya. After negotiations in July 1963, it was agreed that Malaysia would come into being on 31 August 1963, consisting of Malaya, Singapore, Sabah and Sarawak. Brunei ultimately decided to opt out of the federation due in part to an armed revolt by the People's Party (Parti Rakyat Brunei) which objected to the formation of Malaysia, and the Sultan of Brunei Omar Ali Saifuddien III's demand that he be recognised as the most senior Malay ruler—a demand that was rejected.

The Philippines and Indonesia strenuously objected to this development, with Indonesia claiming Malaysia represented a form of neocolonialism and the Philippines claiming Sabah as its territory. The United Nations sent a commission to the region which approved the merger after having delayed the date of Malaysia's formation to investigate. Despite further protests from the Indonesian President, Sukarno, the formation of Malaysia was proclaimed on 16 September 1963. Indonesia then declared a "confrontation" with Malaysia, sending commandos to perform guerilla attacks in East Malaysia (Sabah and Sarawak). The confrontation was ended when Suharto replaced Sukarno as president. The Philippines, which had withdrawn diplomatic recognition from Malaysia, also recognised Malaysia around the same time.

To reflect the change of name to Malaysia, UMNO's coalition partners promptly altered their names to the Malaysian Chinese Association and the Malaysian Indian Congress. Several political parties in East Malaysia, especially Sarawak, also joined the Alliance to allow it to contest elections there.

==== Relations with Singapore ====
In the 1963 Singapore state elections, the Alliance sought to challenge Lee Kuan Yew's governing People's Action Party (PAP) through the Singapore Alliance Party. UMNO politicians campaigned actively in Singapore for the Singapore Alliance, alleging that Malay Singaporeans were treated as "second-class citizens" under what they described as a Chinese-dominated PAP administration. Despite these claims, all UMNO-backed Malay candidates were decisively defeated by PAP candidates, including in constituencies with a Malay majority. Following the losses, UMNO Secretary-General Syed Jaafar Albar travelled to Singapore to address the Malay community. At one rally, he denounced PAP Malay politicians such as Othman Wok as "un-Islamic" and accused them of "betraying the Malay race", which sharply strained relations. PAP leaders viewed this as a breach of an earlier understanding with the Alliance that neither side would contest elections in the other's territories. In response, the PAP entered the 1964 general election in Peninsular Malaysia, winning the parliamentary seat of Bangsar out of the nine contested and drawing large and enthusiastic crowds at its rallies. The political rivalry, conducted increasingly along communal lines, deepened tensions and contributed to the outbreak of the 1964 race riots.

Alliance leaders grew increasingly uneasy with Lee's political style, which they regarded as unsuitable for a state leader within the federation. Some extremists within UMNO even wanted him arrested. Under the Malaysia Agreement, Singapore retained the title of "Prime Minister", reflecting the state's higher degree of autonomy compared to other states such as Penang, where the head of government was called the Chief Minister. Some Malaysian leaders perceived Lee as behaving like the head of a sovereign state rather than a state within the federation. Finance Minister Tan Siew Sin of the MCA called Lee "the greatest disruptive force in the entire history of Malaysia and Malaya". Lee, committed to advancing a multi-racial vision, expanded his political reach beyond Singapore by forming the Malaysian Solidarity Council, a coalition advocating a "Malaysian Malaysia", an idea first championed by Onn Jaafar, ironically the founder of UMNO himself.

On 7 August 1965, the Independence of Singapore Agreement 1965 was signed by both Singaporean and Malaysian leaders. On that day, Prime Minister Tunku Abdul Rahman, judging that separation was the only viable means to prevent further violence and preserve stability, urged the Parliament of Malaysia to vote in favour of Singapore's departure from Malaysia. On 9 August 1965, the Parliament voted 126 to 0 in favour of separation with no Members of Parliament from Singapore present.

Tunku began his address to Parliament with the words, "In all the ten years of my leadership of this House I have never had a duty so unpleasant as this to perform. The announcement which I am making concerns the separation of Singapore from the rest of the Federation." That same day, Lee Kuan Yew proclaimed Singapore as a sovereign and independent nation and continued in office as Prime Minister. Following the separation, the Singapore branch of UMNO was reorganised and renamed the Singapore Malay National Organisation (Pertubuhan Kebangsaan Melayu Singapura), with little to no relevance in the Singaporean political scene post-independence.

=== Post-separation ===
After the separation of Singapore from the federation, the Alliance leaders focused on continuing its policies. One involved the Malay language, which was the official language of Malaysia. UMNO sought to reduce the reliance on English in government affairs. In this, it was aided by PAS, the Pan-Malaysian Islamic Party, which backed special rights for the Bumiputra, and the strengthening of Islam's position in public affairs. However, the PAP's Malaysian branch, which had now become Democratic Action Party (DAP), took a very strong stance against this, and continued the expelled PAP's call for a "Malaysian Malaysia". In 1968, the newly formed Parti Gerakan Rakyat Malaysia or Gerakan, led by Lim Chong Eu, also adopted the DAP's stance.

Matters came to a head in the 1969 general election. When polling closed on the mainland peninsula (West Malaysia) on 10 May, it emerged the Alliance had won less than half of the popular vote, although it was assured of 66 out of 104 Parliamentary seats available. Much of the losses came from the MCA, thus straining relations between the two parties. However, the Alliance was dealt an even larger blow on the state level, losing control of Kelantan, Perak, and Penang.

A major riot broke out in the aftermath of the election on 13 May 1969. The Yang di-Pertuan Agong (King) declared a national emergency after being advised by the national government to do so. Parliament was suspended, with a National Operations Council (NOC) led by Deputy Prime Minister Abdul Razak Hussein of UMNO, taking over the government. Further polling in East Malaysia as a continuation of the general election was also postponed indefinitely. Although the Cabinet still met under the Tunku as Prime Minister, his role was largely symbolic, with Abdul Razak taking over the role of chief executive.

UMNO backbencher Mahathir Mohamad, who had lost his Parliamentary seat in the election, wrote a letter to the Tunku criticising his leadership. Mahathir organised a campaign with University of Malaya lecturer Raja Muktaruddin Daim, circulating his letter among the student bodies of local universities. Mass demonstrations broke out calling for "Malay sovereignty" and the Tunku's ousting. After the riot, Home Affairs Minister Ismail Abdul Rahman and Abdul Razak agreed to expel Mahathir and former Executive Secretary of UMNO Musa Hitam from the party for breaching party discipline.

The suspended elections in East Malaysia were held in 1970, and restored the Alliance government's two-thirds majority in parliament. On 31 August that year, the Tunku announced the national ideology of Rukun Negara and his planned retirement as Prime Minister in favour of Abdul Razak. He also stated Parliament would be restored the following year.

=== The New Economic Policy ===
After Abdul Razak succeeded the Tunku in 1970, he began asserting UMNO's leadership in the Alliance more strongly. When the Tunku led the coalition, he had always consulted Alliance leaders regarding policy—if an Alliance leader objected, the policy was not passed. Under Abdul Razak, UMNO was the base of the Alliance and thus the government. The NOC which he led until Parliament reconvened consisted of 7 Malays, one Chinese and one Indian.

In Abdul Razak's cabinet, the two most powerful men other than him were Ismail Abdul Rahman and Ghazali Shafie, who had declared the Westminster-style Parliamentary system inappropriate for Malaysia. Abdul Razak also readmitted to the party "ultras" who had been expelled, like Mahathir and Musa Hitam. Mahathir gained notoriety after his expulsion from UMNO by authoring The Malay Dilemma, a book promptly banned from Malaysia, which posited that the Malays are the definitive people of Malaysia and thus deserved special rights as the sovereign people of the nation. It also controversially argued that the Malays needed affirmative action to overcome deficiencies in their genetic stock.

The Abdul Razak government announced the New Economic Policy in 1971. Its stated goal was to "eventually eradicate poverty... irrespective of race" through a "rapidly expanding economy" which emphasised to increase the Malays' share in the national economy to a reasonable portion between all the races. The NEP targeted a 30 per cent Malay share of the economy by 1990. The government contended that this would lead to a "just society" ("Masyarakat Adil"), the latter slogan being used to promote acceptance of the policy. Quotas in education and the civil service that the Constitution had explicitly provided for were expanded by the NEP, which also mandated government interference in the private sector. For instance, 30% of all shares in initial public offerings would be disbursed by the government to selective Bumiputeras. The old civil service hiring quota of 4 Malays for every non-Malay's was effectively disregarded in practice; between 1969 and 1973, 98% of all new government employees were Malay. Five new universities were opened under the NEP, two of which were targeted to focus on the poor Malays and Muslim citizens.

Abdul Razak also began shoring up the government by bringing in several former opposition parties into the fold of the Alliance. Gerakan, PPP, PAS, and several former opposition parties in East Malaysia joined the coalition, which was renamed as Barisan Nasional. Barisan was formally registered as an organisation in 1974, the same year in which a general election was held.

There had been much internal conflict in the National Front regarding the election; in 1973, Lim Keng Yaik and several supporters of his aggressive pro-Chinese stance left the MCA for Gerakan. This contributed to internal strife, as the MCA was no longer the sole representative of Chinese interests in the National Front.

Discontent among student organisations in Malaysian universities soon posed a new problem for the UMNO-led government. After stories that children of rubber tappers had died after consuming poisonous wild yam due to poverty, university students reacted by staging the 1974 Baling demonstrations. The demonstrations resulted in the arrest of over 1,000 students, including Anwar Ibrahim who was detained under the Internal Security Act. In 1975, parliament passed amendments to the Universities and University Colleges Act which banned students from expressing support of or holding positions in any political party or trade union without written consent from the university's Vice-Chancellor. The act also banned political demonstrations from being held on university campuses. In 1976, however, mass demonstrations were held at the MARA Institute of Technology, protesting the UUCA.

BN was also challenged in Sarawak after the 1974 election, which saw the Sarawak National Party led by James Wong become tied with the DAP as the largest opposition party in Parliament, both of them holding nine seats each. SNAP had campaigned against BN on a platform of opposing Chief Minister Abdul Rahman Ya'kub's pro-Malay policies, charging them with alienating the rural indigenous natives of Sarawak, such as the Ibans. SNAP had been expelled from the Alliance in 1965 for supporting increased autonomy for Sarawak. In the aftermath of the election, Abdul Rahman ordered the detention of James Wong under the Sedition Act. SNAP elected a new leader, Leo Moggie Irok, who secured the release of Wong and the entry of SNAP into BN in 1976.

In Sabah, BN controlled the state government through the United Sabah National Organisation (USNO), which strongly backed UMNO's pro-Malay and pro-Islam policies. In 1973, Islam was made the official Sabah state religion (the official religion of Sabah was originally Christianity, as permitted by the agreement signed before the merger), and usage of indigenous languages such as those of the Kadazan people was discontinued in favour of the Malay language. The USNO Chief Minister, Mustapha Harun, was also known for favouring political patronage as a means of allocating valuable timber contracts, and living an extravagant lifestyle, being ferried to his A$1 million Queensland home by jets provided with Sabahan public funds.

In 1978, UMNO planned for a new headquarters on a site at Jalan Tun Dr Ismail, initially as a twin tower with one of the towers being 40 stories high, costing a total of RM200 million.

=== Mahathir era ===
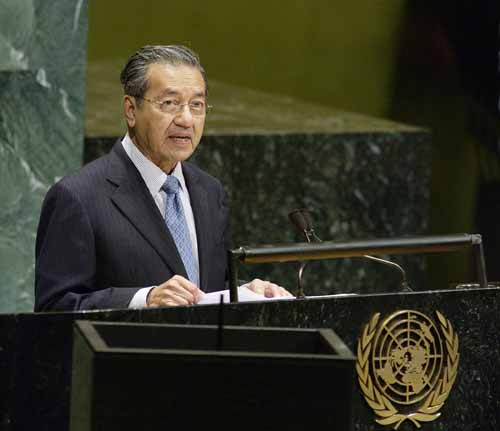
Mahathir Mohamad

On 24 April 1987, UMNO held its Annual General Assembly and triennial Party election. The then Prime Minister and party President, Mahathir Mohamad, faced his first party election in 12 years, having been elected unopposed since the 1975 UMNO election.

The politics of the Malays, particularly UMNO politics, had undergone a sea change in the first few years of the Mahathir stewardship, and the party presidency was challenged for the second time in 41 years. In fact, in the early 1950s, Tunku Abdul Rahman's presidency had also been challenged by C. M. Yusof, who later became the Speaker of the Dewan Rakyat, but Tunku was not properly considered an incumbent then, being only a care-taker president.

The 1987 contest was a vastly different matter. Mahathir was opposed by his very popular former Finance Minister, Tengku Razaleigh Hamzah. The press took to referring to Mahathir and his supporters as Team A, and Razaleigh's camp as Team B. Team B included then Deputy Prime Minister Musa Hitam, who was also the incumbent Deputy President of UMNO seeking re-election, as well as Suhaimi Kamaruddin, the former head of UMNO Youth and president of the Belia 4B youth organisation.

Team B was critical of Mahathir's policies, arguing that the Malaysian New Economic Policy had failed to benefit the poor Malays. It also criticised Mahathir's leadership style, alleging he acted unilaterally without consulting other leaders in UMNO and the Barisan Nasional. Team B was also perceived as less Islamist than Mahathir's faction.

Mahathir claimed that the charges against him were groundless, and suggested that his opponents were fracturing Malay unity and were only motivated by greed.

Eventually, Mahathir was returned to office. However, he was elected with such a small majority of 43 (761 against 718 votes) that questions were immediately raised about his mandate. Team B supporters, many of whom had been anticipating a victory of similar margins, suspected that the election had been fixed. The Team B candidate for Deputy President, Musa Hitam, had also been defeated by Abdul Ghafar Baba of Team A, while two of the three Vice Presidents were Team A candidates. The Supreme Council comprised 16 Team A candidates and 9 Team B candidates.

Allegations were made that several delegates who had voted were drawn from UMNO branches not properly registered. There were also several unproved allegations being bandied about that the balloting process had not been above board.

Nevertheless, Razaleigh pledged to support Mahathir, provided that a "witch hunt" was not launched. However, Mahathir promptly purged the government cabinet of all Team B members, and launched similar reshuffles in state and local governments.

On 25 June 1987, an appeal was filed by 12 of the UMNO delegates to have the assembly and the election of April 1987 declared null. After one of the delegates, Hussain bin Manap, withdrew unexpectedly in August from filing the appeal, the remaining litigants have since become famous as the "UMNO 11." Although Razaleigh and Musa Hitam were not among the plaintiffs, it was widely believed that Razaleigh was funding the appeal.

After a series of interlocutory hearings over the discovery of documents that took more than seven months, the matter finally came before Justice Harun Hashim in the Kuala Lumpur High Court on 4 February 1988. The judge ruled that under the existing law he had no option but to find the party, UMNO, to be an unlawful society due to the existence of several unregistered branches—an illegal act under the Societies Act of 1966. The question of the Assembly itself being illegal therefore became academic.

"'It is a very hard decision to declare UMNO unlawful,' said Justice Harun Hashim in his February 4 judgement. 'But the law was made by our Parliament and certainly UMNO was aware [of the Societies Act] because they were in the majority [in Parliament] at all times [when the law was made].' Under the 1966 Act, amended five times over the years, and most recently by Mahathir's government, each of the society's branches has to register separately with the Registrar...."

Then, Razaleigh set up a new party called Semangat 46, which claimed to be the successor to the old UMNO. UMNO Malaysia was supported mainly by members of the Team B faction from UMNO, but Mahathir was also invited to join the party leadership. However, the party collapsed after the Registrar of Societies refused to register it as a society without providing an explanation.

Mahathir showed no interest in reviving UMNO, and instead he set in motion the machinery to form a new surrogate party, and in due course, registered a party formally called Pertubuhan Kebangsaan Melayu Bersatu (Baru) or UMNO (New) a week after UMNO Malaysia's registration was rejected. Eventually the suffix "(New)" was dropped, and UMNO (Baru) became both the de facto and de jure successor of original UMNO, dropping the 'Baru' suffix with the old UMNO's assets handed over. Most of its leaders, however, were selected from Team A of the old UMNO, with Team B ignored.

In 10th general election in 1999, rocked by the arrest and trial of former UMNO Deputy President Anwar Ibrahim and the subsequent formation of the Barisan Alternatif opposition coalition, UMNO's share dipped to 54% of the vote, winning 102 out of 144 seats.

=== Post-Mahathir ===
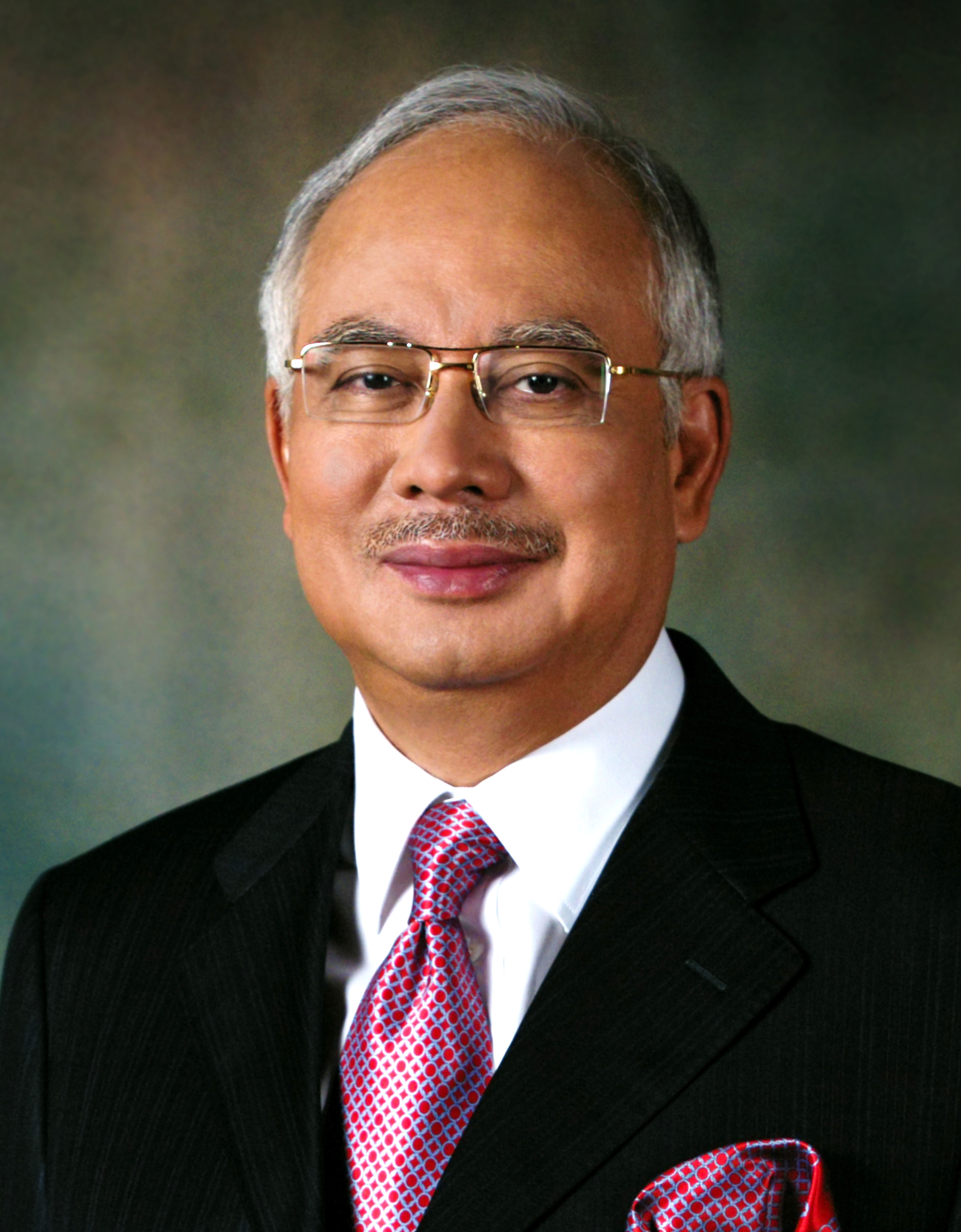
Najib Razak served as the 6th Prime Minister of Malaysia from 2009 to 2018, but his tenure was marred by allegations of corruption, most notably the 1MDB scandal.

After Mahathir stepped down as President of UMNO in 2003, he was replaced by his designated successor, Abdullah Ahmad Badawi, who became the 5th Prime Minister of Malaysia. Najib Razak, the son of Abdul Razak Hussein, took over as the Deputy Prime Minister of Malaysia.

In the 11th general election in 2004, Barisan Nasional, under Abdullah's leadership, enjoyed a landslide victory. However, in the 12th general election in 2008, the coalition for the first time fell short of a two-thirds majority in the Parliament. UMNO Chief Ministers were ousted in the states of Selangor, Perak, Penang and Kedah. As a result, Abdullah resigned as President of UMNO and Prime Minister in 2009. He was succeeded by Najib.

Under Najib's leadership, UMNO gained a total of 9 seats in the 13th general election and retook the state of Kedah. Mahathir's son Mukhriz Mahathir became Kedah Menteri Besar. However, in 2015, the 1MDB scandal emerged, implicating Najib and leading to widespread controversy. The scandal severely affected UMNO's reputation, causing internal divisions and public backlash.

In 2018, UMNO was required to hold a leadership election 19 April by the requirements of the Registry of Societies (RoS), to hold a leadership election within five years of the last leadership election, as the last leadership election was in 2013. In April, some UMNO members filed a suit to declare UMNO illegal but was dismissed by the High Court. UMNO announced in May that the RoS had in 2017 allowed UMNO to postpone the election until 19 April 2019.

On 9 May 2018, Mahathir and the Pakatan Harapan (PH) coalition won the 14th General Election ending UMNO's 61 year long rule as part of the Alliance and later Barisan Nasional coalition. UMNO experienced a mass exodus of rank-and-file members, state chiefs, as well as Members of Parliament in favour of Mahathir's BERSATU and regionalist parties such as Parti Warisan Sabah in the months after the election.

After the general election defeat, UMNO held the UMNO leadership election in June 2018 instead of 2019. Former Deputy Prime Minister Ahmad Zahid Hamidi was elected the 8th UMNO president in a three-way contest. He defeated former UMNO Youth chief Khairy Jamaluddin and veteran leader Tengku Razaleigh Hamzah. The outcome was regarded by political observers as a defining moment in UMNO's post-defeat trajectory, setting the tone for its strategies in opposition and in subsequent coalition governments.

In September 2019, UMNO decided to form a pact with the Malaysian Islamic Party called Muafakat Nasional. Its main purpose is to unite the Malay Muslim communities for electoral purposes. There is however no formal agreement with the other parties of Barisan Nasional, although there are calls for Barisan Nasional to migrate to Muafakat Nasional. Barisan Nasional continued to function as a coalition of four parties comprising UMNO, MCA, MIC and PBRS, but aligned themselves with Perikatan Nasional (PN) to form a new government in March 2020 after the collapse of the Pakatan Harapan government.

In February 2020, in the leadup to the 2020–2022 Malaysian political crisis, UMNO leaders Ahmad Zahid Hamidi and Ismail Sabri Yaakob, along with BERSATU President Muhyiddin Yassin, PAS President Abdul Hadi Awang and PKR defector members led by Azmin Ali, collectively convened at the Sheraton Petaling Jaya hotel to initiate a change in government, thus causing political instability by depriving the elected Pakatan Harapan government of a majority within the Members of the Dewan Rakyat in the 14th Malaysian Parliament. As a result, Prime Minister Mahathir Mohamad (along with the Seventh Mahathir cabinet) tendered their resignation. In March 2020, after the Yang di-Pertuan Agong Al-Sultan Abdullah consulted all members of the Dewan Rakyat. Muhyiddin Yassin, with the support of UMNO and other non-PH & Warisan parties, was deemed to have the greatest support within Parliament and was selected as the 8th Prime Minister of Malaysia.

In Muhyiddin's cabinet, which formed on 10 March 2020, six UMNO MPs became Ministers & eight UMNO MPs became Deputy Ministers, but excluded UMNO's top 2 positions. President Ahmad Zahid had court cases and Deputy President Mohamad Hasan was not a member of Dewan Rakyat (but could have been appointed as a member of Dewan Negara).

In July 2021, further political instability ensued when UMNO, at the direction of its President Ahmad Zahid, withdrew support for the government led by Muhyiddin along with his cabinet. Zahid claimed that as Muhyiddin failed to spearhead economic recovery and effectively handle the Covid-19 pandemic, therefore Zahid claimed Muhyiddin failed to fulfil the conditions underlined by UMNO when it backed Muhyiddin to become prime minister in March 2020. In August 2021, after the Yang di-Pertuan Agong required all members of the Dewan Rakyat to submit a statutory declaration (SD) indicating their preference of Prime Minister,. Vice President Ismail Sabri Yaakob possessed the greatest support within Parliament (with 114 affirmative SDs out of a possible 222) and was selected as the 9th Prime Minister of Malaysia, thus created history by the being the only non-coalition party leader to be elected as Prime Minister. Additionally, history was also made as three Prime Ministers took office in a single parliamentary term.

In the 2022 election, UMNO, as a part of BN, faced the worst-ever result in Malaysian history, with only winning 26 out of 222 seats. Several key figures including Tengku Razaleigh Hamzah, Mahdzir Khalid, Azeez Rahim, Tengku Zafrul Aziz, Khairy Jamaluddin, lost to either PN or PH candidates. UMNO was also defeated at several state elections held in Pahang and Perak, and lost all seats in Perlis. President Ahmad Zahid was re-elected with a slim majority.

== Ideology ==
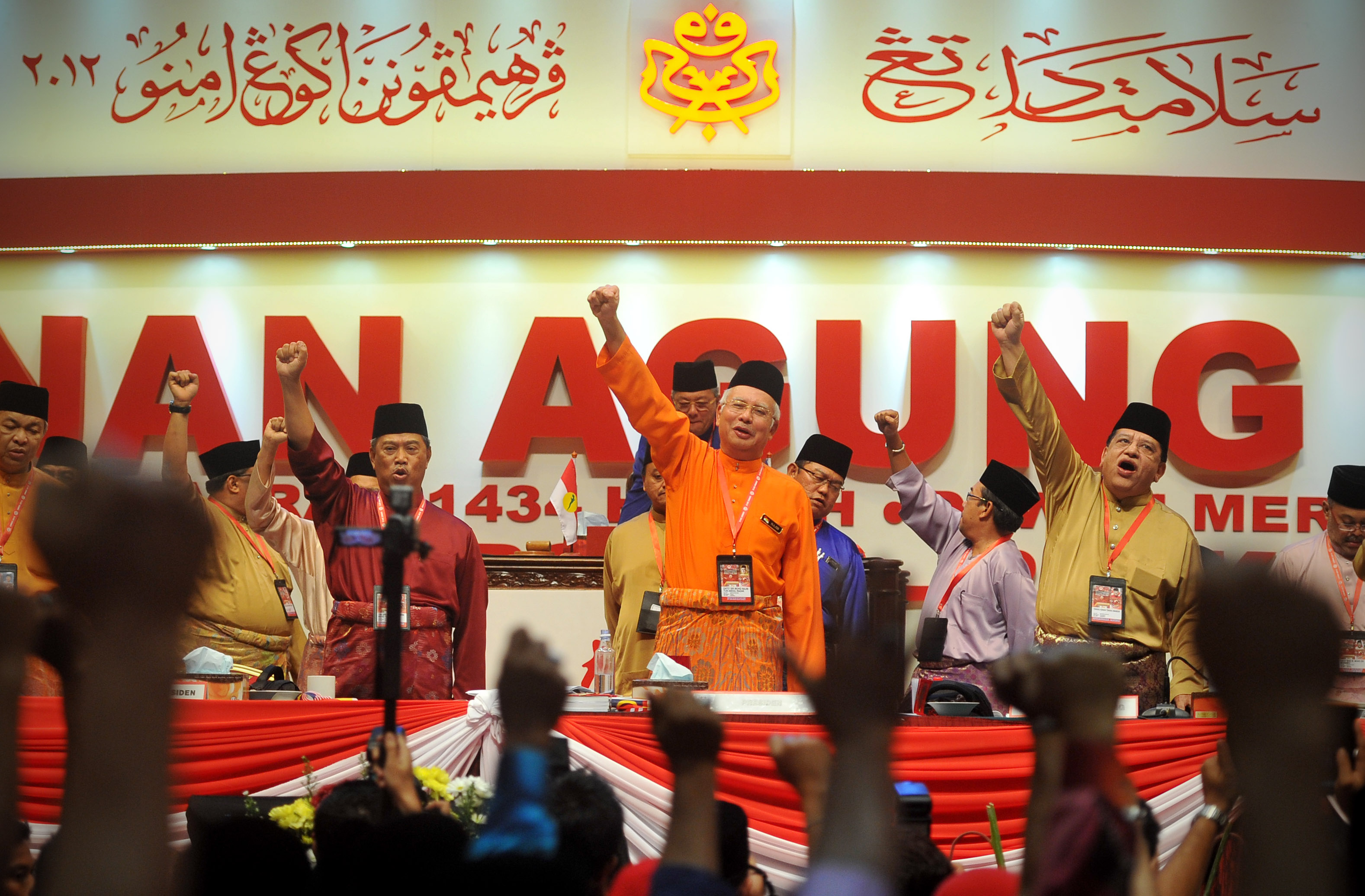
(L-R) Zahid Hamidi, Muhyiddin Yassin, Najib Razak and Tengku Adnan at the 2012 UMNO General Assembly

UMNO overtly represents the Malays of Malaysia, although any Bumiputera (indigenous Malaysian, a category which includes people such as the non-Malay and usually non-Muslim Kadazan, Iban, Dayak, etc. of East Malaysia) may join the party. The party propagates Ketuanan Melayu, the concept that the Bumiputera, including ethnic Malays, enjoy a special status within the country by virtue of their earlier perceived settlement of the lands that now form Malaysia and as a result of the recognition of Malays in Article 153 of the Constitution of Malaysia.

UMNO is largely seen as socially conservative and in most cases economically liberal with authoritarian tendencies.

=== Bumiputera policies ===
In 2018, Prime Minister Mahathir Mohamad announced the cabinet's decision for the government to "ratify all remaining core UN instruments related to the protection of human rights", including International Convention on the Elimination of All Forms of Racial Discrimination (ICERD) and other five previously unratified conventions at a United Nations General Assembly, UMNO, PAS along with various non-governmental organisations, staged an anti-ICERD rally that was held at the Dataran Merdeka, Kuala Lumpur, to protest against the ratifications of the relevant international conventions, due to their perception that these human rights instruments contravene with the special position of the Malays, Bumiputera and Islam within the country; all of which are enshrined within the Malaysian Constitution.

On 23 November 2018, the Prime Minister's Office announced they would not ratify the convention and would continue defending the Federal Constitution, which they said represents a social contract that was agreed upon by all races during the formation of the country.

In 2021, a new equity policy for Bumiputeras in the Twelfth Malaysia Plan (12MP) attracted controversy which were announced by Ismail Sabri Yaakob. It is said to ensure sustainable equity holdings by Bumiputeras, an equity safety net would be launched to guarantee that the sale of shares or Bumiputera-owned firms would only be sold solely to Bumiputera-owned companies, consortium or individuals. Syed Saddiq said that the new rulings were unfair as they would be tantamount to taking equity from the non-Bumiputeras and giving them to Bumiputeras. Former Health Minister, Dzulkefly Ahmad had also described the policy as "suicidal" and claimed that the new policy would only kill the Bumiputera companies economically if that is their intention. He also said that based on the feedback from Malay businessmen, most were against the idea of the new Bumiputera-only policy being implemented. Ismail Sabri announced it after revealing that the government’s target to raise Bumiputera equity ownership to 30% had yet to be achieved. He also announced funding to improve Bumiputera businesses’ sustainability to hit 15% contribution in gross domestic product (GDP) by Bumiputera micro, small and medium enterprises by 2025.

== Organisational structure ==
=== Supreme Council (2023–2026) ===
Official source

- Permanent Chairperson:
  - Badruddin Amiruldin
- Deputy Permanent Chairperson:
  - Abdul Fattah Abdullah
- President:
  - Ahmad Zahid Hamidi
- Deputy President:
  - Mohamad Hasan
- Vice Presidents:
  - Wan Rosdy Wan Ismail
  - Mohamed Khaled Nordin
  - Johari Abdul Ghani
- Women's Chief:
  - Noraini Ahmad
- Youth Chief:
  - Muhamad Akmal Saleh
- Women's Youth Chief:
  - Nurul Amal Mohd Fauzi
- Secretary-General:
  - Asyraf Wajdi Dusuki
- Treasurer:
  - Tengku Adnan Tengku Mansor
- Information Chief:
  - Azalina Othman Said
- Executive Secretary:
  - Mohd Sumali Reduan
- Election Director:
  - Reezal Merican Naina Merican
- Political Secretary to the President:
  - Abdul Halim Mohamad
- Supreme Council Members (elected):
  - Shamsul Anuar Nasarah
  - Zambry Abdul Kadir
  - Ahmad Maslan
  - Ahmad Jazlan Yaakub
  - Abdul Azeez Abdul Rahim
  - Shahaniza Shamsuddin
  - Azian Osman
  - Md Alwi Che Ahmad
  - Shaik Hussein Mydin
  - Zahida Zarik Khan
  - Mohd Razlan Muhammad Rafii
  - Mohd Sharkar Shamsudin
  - Abdul Rahman Mohamad
  - Jamil Khir Baharom
  - Johan Abd Aziz
  - Abdul Rahman Dahlan
  - Lokman Noor Adam
  - Ahmad Said
  - Rosnah Shirlin
  - Mohd Rafi Alli Hassan
  - Abdul Razak Abdul Rahman
- Supreme Council Members (appointed):
  - Shahrizat Abdul Jalil
  - Mohamad Fatmi Che Salleh
  - Mohd Shafei Abdullah
  - Nur Jazlan Mohamed
  - Ahmad Ismail
  - Hasmuni Hassan
  - Mohd Hasnol Ayub
  - Mohd Faizal Ramli
  - Jailani Johari
  - Mohd Arrif Abdul Majid
  - Norliza Abdul Rahim
  - Mohd Hairi Mad Shah
  - Siti Sokhleha Nordin
- Supreme Council Members (in attendance):
  - Mohamad Alamin
  - Siti Aminah Aching
  - Reezal Merican Naina Merican
  - Yakubah Khan
  - Ahmad Shabery Cheek
  - Ramli Mohd Nor
  - Othman Desa
  - Ismail Lasim
- State Chairman:
  - Perlis: Rozabil Abd Rahman
  - Kedah: Mahdzir Khalid
  - Kelantan: Ahmad Jazlan Yaakub
  - Terengganu: Rozi Mamat
  - Penang: Musa Sheikh Fadzir
  - Perak: Saarani Mohamad
  - Pahang: Wan Rosdy Wan Ismail
  - Selangor: Megat Zulkarnain Omardin
  - Federal Territories: Johari Abdul Ghani
  - Negeri Sembilan: Jalaluddin Alias
  - Malacca: Ab Rauf Yusoh
  - Johor: Onn Hafiz Ghazi
  - Sabah: Jafry Ariffin
- State Deputy Chairman:
  - Perlis: Fathul Bari Mat Jahya
  - Kedah: Abdul Azeez Abdul Rahim
  - Kelantan: Mohamad Fatmi Che Salleh
  - Terengganu: Nik Dir Nik Wan Ku
  - Penang: Shaik Hussein Mydin
  - Perak: Azian Osman
  - Pahang: Abdul Hamid Mohd Nazahar
  - Selangor: Johan Abd Aziz
  - Federal Territories: Mohd Shafei Abdullah
  - Negeri Sembilan: Hasim Rusdi
  - Malacca: Rais Yasin
  - Johor: Ahmad Maslan
  - Sabah: Mohd Hasnol Ayub

== Leadership ==
=== President ===
No.	Image	President	Term start	Term end
1.		Onn Jaafar	11 May 1946	25 August 1951
2.		Tunku Abdul Rahman	25 August 1951	23 January 1971
3		Abdul Razak Hussein	25 June 1972	14 January 1976
4		Hussein Onn	15 September 1978	28 June 1981
5		Mahathir Mohamad	28 June 1981	31 October 2003
6		Abdullah Ahmad Badawi	23 September 2004	26 March 2009
7		Najib Razak	26 March 2009	12 May 2018
8		Ahmad Zahid Hamidi	30 June 2018	Incumbent

=== Women's Chief ===
#	Name	Term start	Term end
1	Putih Mariah Ibrahim Rashid	1947	1949
2	Zainon Munshi Sulaiman	1950	1953
3	Khadijah Sidek	1954	1956
4	Fatimah Hashim	1957	1972
5	Aishah Ghani	1972	1986
6	Rafidah Aziz	1987	1996
7	Siti Zaharah Sulaiman	1996	2000
8	Rafidah Aziz	2000	2009
9	Shahrizat Abdul Jalil	26 March 2009	24 June 2018
10	Noraini Ahmad	24 June 2018	Incumbent

=== Youth Chief ===
No.	Name	Term start	Term end
1	Hussein Onn	1949	1951
2	Abdul Razak Hussein	1951	1951
3	Sardon Jubir	1951	1964
4	Senu Abdul Rahman	1964	1971
5	Harun Idris	1971	1976
6	Syed Jaafar Albar	1976	1977
7	Suhaimi Kamaruddin	1977	1982
8	Anwar Ibrahim	1982	1987
9	Najib Razak	1987	1993
10	Rahim Thamby Chik	1993	1994
–	Mohamed Nazri Abdul Aziz (Acting)	1994	1996
11	Ahmad Zahid Hamidi	1996	1998
12	Hishammuddin Hussein	1999	2009
13	Khairy Jamaluddin	26 March 2009	24 June 2018
14	Asyraf Wajdi Dusuki	24 June 2018	11 March 2023
15	Muhamad Akmal Saleh	12 March 2023	Incumbent

=== Women's Youth Chief ===
#	Name	Term start	Term end
1	Azalina Othman Said	2001	2004
2	Noraini Ahmad	2004	2009
3	Rosnah Shirlin	26 March 2009	12 October 2013
4	Mas Ermieyati Samsudin	12 October 2013	24 June 2018
5	Zahida Zarik Khan	24 June 2018	11 March 2023
6	Nurul Amal Mohd Fauzi	12 March 2023	Incumbent

== Elected representatives ==
=== Dewan Negara (Senate) ===
==== Senators ====
- His Majesty's appointee:
  - Zambry Abdul Kadir
  - Nur Jazlan Mohamed
  - Rosni Sohar
  - Mohamad Zaini Salleh
- Perak State Legislative Assembly:
  - Shamsuddin Abd Ghaffar
- Johor State Legislative Assembly:
  - Abdul Halim Suleiman
- Pahang State Legislative Assembly:
  - Norhasmimi Abdul Ghani
  - Shahrol Wizan Sulong

=== Dewan Rakyat (House of Representatives) ===
==== Members of Parliament of the 15th Malaysian Parliament ====
UMNO has 26 MPs in the House of Representatives.

State/Federal Territory	No.	Parliament Constituency	Member	Party
Perak	P055	Lenggong	Shamsul Anuar Nasarah	UMNO
Perak	P075	Bagan Datuk	Ahmad Zahid Hamidi	UMNO
Pahang	P078	Cameron Highlands	Ramli Mohd Nor	UMNO
Pahang	P079	Lipis	Abdul Rahman Mohamad	UMNO
Pahang	P084	Paya Besar	Mohd Shahar Abdullah	UMNO
Pahang	P085	Pekan	Sh Mohmed Puzi Sh Ali	UMNO
Pahang	P090	Bera	Ismail Sabri Yaakob	UMNO
Kuala Lumpur	P119	Titiwangsa	Johari Abdul Ghani	UMNO
Negeri Sembilan	P126	Jelebu	Jalaluddin Alias	UMNO
Negeri Sembilan	P127	Jempol	Shamshulkahar Mohd Deli	UMNO
Negeri Sembilan	P129	Kuala Pilah	Adnan Abu Hassan	UMNO
Negeri Sembilan	P131	Rembau	Mohamad Hasan	UMNO
Negeri Sembilan	P133	Tampin	Mohd Isam Mohd Isa	UMNO
Johor	P147	Parit Sulong	Noraini Ahmad	UMNO
Johor	P151	Simpang Renggam	Hasni Mohammad	UMNO
Johor	P153	Sembrong	Hishammuddin Hussein	UMNO
Johor	P155	Tenggara	Manndzri Nasib	UMNO
Johor	P156	Kota Tinggi	Mohamed Khaled Nordin	UMNO
Johor	P157	Pengerang	Azalina Othman Said	UMNO
Johor	P164	Pontian	Ahmad Maslan	UMNO
Sabah	P173	Putatan	~~Shahelmey Yahya~~	UMNO
Sabah	P176	Kimanis	Mohamad Alamin	UMNO
Sabah	P177	Beaufort	Siti Aminah Aching	UMNO
Sabah	P184	Libaran	Suhaimi Nasir	UMNO
Sabah	P187	Kinabatangan	Naim Kurniawan Moktar	UMNO
Sabah	P191	Kalabakan	~~Andi Muhammad Suryady Bandy~~	UMNO
Total	Perak (2), Pahang (5), F.T. Kuala Lumpur (1), Negeri Sembilan (5), Johor (7), Sabah (6)			

=== Dewan Undangan Negeri (State Legislative Assembly) ===
Johor State Legislative Assembly
36 / 56
Malacca State Legislative Assembly
18 / 28
Negeri Sembilan State Legislative Assembly
16 / 36
Pahang State Legislative Assembly
17 / 47
Perak State Legislative Assembly
8 / 59
Sabah State Legislative Assembly
5 / 79
Penang State Legislative Assembly
2 / 40
Kelantan State Legislative Assembly
2 / 45
Selangor State Legislative Assembly
2 / 56
Kedah State Legislative Assembly
0 / 36
Perlis State Legislative Assembly
0 / 15
Terengganu State Legislative Assembly
0 / 33

State	No.	Parliament Constituency	No.	State Constituency	Member
Kelantan	P032	Gua Musang	N43	Nenggiri	Mohd Azmawi Fikri Abdul Ghani
Kelantan	P032	Gua Musang	N45	Galas	Mohd Syahbuddin Hashim
Penang	P041	Kepala Batas	N02	Bertam	Reezal Merican Naina Merican
Penang	P047	Nibong Tebal	N21	Sungai Acheh	Rashidi Zinol
Perak	P054	Gerik	N02	Temenggor	Salbiah Mohamed
Perak	P055	Lenggong	N04	Kota Tampan	Saarani Mohamad
Perak	P062	Sungai Siput	N21	Lintang	Mohd Zolkafly Harun
Perak	P068	Beruas	N36	Pengkalan Baharu	Azman Noh
Perak	P069	Parit	N39	Belanja	Khairudin Abu Hanipah
Perak	P072	Tapah	N48	Ayer Kuning	Mohamad Yusri Bakir
Perak	P075	Bagan Datuk	N53	Rungkup	Shahrul Zaman Yahya
Perak	P077	Tanjong Malim	N59	Behrang	Salina Samsudin
Pahang	P078	Cameron Highlands	N02	Jelai	Wan Rosdy Wan Ismail
Pahang	P079	Lipis	N03	Padang Tengku	Mustapa Long
Pahang	P079	Lipis	N05	Benta	Mohd Soffi Abd Razak
Pahang	P080	Raub	N06	Batu Talam	Abd. Aziz Mat Kiram
Pahang	P080	Raub	N08	Dong	Fadzli Mohamad Kamal
Pahang	P083	Kuantan	N16	Inderapura	Shafik Fauzan Sharif
Pahang	P085	Pekan	N21	Peramu Jaya	Nizar Najib
Pahang	P085	Pekan	N22	Bebar	Mohd. Fakhruddin Mohd. Arif
Pahang	P085	Pekan	N23	Chini	Mohd Sharim Md Zain
Pahang	P086	Maran	N27	Jenderak	Rodzuan Zaaba
Pahang	P087	Kuala Krau	N28	Kerdau	Syed Ibrahim Syed Ahmad
Pahang	P089	Bentong	N36	Pelangai	Amizar Abu Adam
Pahang	P090	Bera	N37	Guai	Sabariah Saidan
Pahang	P090	Bera	N39	Kemayan	Khaizulnizam Mohd Zuldin
Pahang	P091	Rompin	N41	Muadzam Shah	Razali Kassim
Pahang	P091	Rompin	N42	Tioman	Mohd Johari Hussain
Pahang	—			Nominated Member	Haris Salleh Hamzah
Selangor	P092	Sabak Bernam	N01	Sungai Air Tawar	Rizam Ismail
Selangor	P101	Hulu Langat	N23	Dusun Tua	Johan Abd Aziz
Negeri Sembilan	P126	Jelebu	N02	Pertang	Jalaluddin Alias
Negeri Sembilan	P126	Jelebu	N03	Sungai Lui	Mohd Razi Mohd Ali
Negeri Sembilan	P127	Jempol	N06	Palong	Mustapha Nagoor
Negeri Sembilan	P127	Jempol	N07	Jeram Padang	Mohd Zaidy Abdul Kadir
Negeri Sembilan	P128	Seremban	N09	Lenggeng	Mohd Asna Amin
Negeri Sembilan	P129	Kuala Pilah	N15	Juasseh	Ismail Lasim
Negeri Sembilan	P129	Kuala Pilah	N16	Seri Menanti	Muhammad Sufian Maradzi
Negeri Sembilan	P129	Kuala Pilah	N17	Senaling	Qayyum Abd Jalil
Negeri Sembilan	P129	Kuala Pilah	N18	Pilah	S Leza Md Yasin
Negeri Sembilan	P129	Kuala Pilah	N19	Johol	Saiful Yazan Sulaiman
Negeri Sembilan	P130	Rasah	N20	Labu	Siti Nur Umaira Hasim
Negeri Sembilan	P131	Rembau	N26	Chembong	Zaifulbahri Idris
Negeri Sembilan	P131	Rembau	N27	Rantau	Mohamad Hasan
Negeri Sembilan	P131	Rembau	N28	Kota	Suhaimi Aini
Negeri Sembilan	P132	Port Dickson	N32	Linggi	Mohd Faizal Ramli
Negeri Sembilan	P133	Tampin	N35	Gemencheh	Suhaimizan Bizar
Malacca	P134	Masjid Tanah	N01	Kuala Linggi	Rosli Abdullah
Malacca	P134	Masjid Tanah	N02	Tanjung Bidara	Ab Rauf Yusoh
Malacca	P134	Masjid Tanah	N03	Ayer Limau	Hameed Mytheen Kunju Basheer
Malacca	P134	Masjid Tanah	N04	Lendu	Abdul Hakim Abdul Wahid
Malacca	P134	Masjid Tanah	N05	Taboh Naning	Zulkiflee Mohd Zin
Malacca	P135	Alor Gajah	N06	Rembia	Ahmad Norazril Abd Aziz
Malacca	P135	Alor Gajah	N09	Durian Tunggal	Mustafa Musa
Malacca	P135	Alor Gajah	N10	Asahan	Fairul Nizam Roslan
Malacca	P136	Tangga Batu	N11	Sungai Udang	Rais Yasin
Malacca	P136	Tangga Batu	N12	Pantai Kundor	Tuminah Kadi
Malacca	P137	Hang Tuah Jaya	N15	Pengkalan Batu	Siti Aisyah Mahmood
Malacca	P137	Hang Tuah Jaya	N18	Ayer Molek	Mohd Ridhwan Mohd Ali
Malacca	P138	Kota Melaka	N21	Duyong	Mohd Noor Helmy Abdul Halem
Malacca	P138	Kota Melaka	N23	Telok Mas	Abdul Razak Abdul Rahman
Malacca	P139	Jasin	N25	Rim	Khaidirah Abu Zahar
Malacca	P139	Jasin	N26	Serkam	Azman Abdullah
Malacca	P139	Jasin	N27	Merlimau	Muhamad Akmal Saleh
Malacca	P139	Jasin	N28	Sungai Rambai	Jezlee Pit
Johor	P140	Segamat	N01	Buloh Kasap	Zahari Sarip
Johor	P141	Sekijang	N03	Pemanis	Anuar Abdul Manap
Johor	P142	Labis	N05	Tenang	Mohd Azahar Ibrahim
Johor	P143	Pagoh	N07	Bukit Kepong	Ahmad Syar'e Yusof
Johor	P143	Pagoh	N08	Bukit Pasir	Mohamad Fazli Mohamad Salleh
Johor	P144	Ledang	N09	Gambir	Sahrihan Jani
Johor	P144	Ledang	N11	Serom	Nadhirah Afiqah Abdul Rahim
Johor	P145	Bakri	N14	Bukit Naning	Mohd Ghazali Sabari
Johor	P146	Muar	N15	Maharani	Ashari Md Sarip
Johor	P146	Muar	N16	Sungai Balang	Selamat Takim
Johor	P147	Parit Sulong	N17	Semerah	Mohd Fared Mohd Khalid
Johor	P147	Parit Sulong	N18	Sri Medan	Zulkurnain Kamisan
Johor	P148	Ayer Hitam	N20	Semarang	Samsol Bari Jamali
Johor	P149	Sri Gading	N21	Parit Yaani	Mohamad Najib Samuri
Johor	P149	Sri Gading	N22	Pasir Raja	Nor Rashidah Ramli
Johor	P150	Batu Pahat	N24	Senggarang	Mohd Yusla Ismail
Johor	P150	Batu Pahat	N25	Rengit	Zaidi Japar
Johor	P151	Simpang Renggam	N26	Machap	Onn Hafiz Ghazi
Johor	P152	Kluang	N29	Mahkota	Syed Hussien Syed Abdullah
Johor	P154	Mersing	N32	Endau	Alwiyah Talib
Johor	P154	Mersing	N33	Tenggaroh	Mohd Youzaimi Yusof
Johor	P155	Tenggara	N34	Panti	Muhammad Naqib Md Ghazali
Johor	P155	Tenggara	N35	Pasir Raja	Adham Baba
Johor	P156	Kota Tinggi	N36	Sedili	Muszaidi Makmor
Johor	P156	Kota Tinggi	N37	Johor Lama	Norlizah Noh
Johor	P157	Pengerang	N38	Penawar	Fauziah Misri
Johor	P157	Pengerang	N39	Tanjung Surat	Aznan Tamin
Johor	P158	Tebrau	N40	Tiram	Abdul Halim Suleiman
Johor	P159	Pasir Gudang	N43	Permas	Baharudin Mohamed Taib
Johor	P160	Johor Bahru	N44	Larkin	Mohd Hairi Mad Shah
Johor	P161	Pulai	N47	Kempas	Ramlee Bohani
Johor	P162	Iskandar Puteri	N49	Kota Iskandar	Pandak Ahmad
Johor	P163	Kulai	N50	Bukit Permai	Mohd Jafni Md Shukor
Johor	P164	Pontian	N53	Benut	Mohd Sumali Reduan
Johor	P164	Pontian	N54	Pulai Sebatang	Hasrunizah Hassan
Johor	P165	Tanjung Piai	N56	Kukup	Md Israk Abdullah
Sabah	P167	Kudat	N2	Bengkoka	Harun Durabi
Sabah	P180	Keningau	N41	Liawan	Nik Mohd Nadzri Nik Zawawi
Sabah	P187	Kinabatangan	N58	Lamag	Mohd Ismail Ayob
Sabah	P187	Kinabatangan	N59	Sukau	Jafry Ariffin
Sabah	P188	Lahad Datu	N63	Kunak	Anil Sandhu
Total	Kelantan (2), Penang (2), Perak (8), Pahang (17), Selangor (2), Negeri Sembilan (16), Malacca (18), Johor (36), Sabah (5)				

== Government offices ==
=== Governors ===
State	Leader type	Member
Penang	Yang Di-Pertua Negeri	Tun Ramli Ngah Talib
Sabah	Yang Di-Pertua Negeri	Tun Musa Aman

=== State governments ===
State	Leader type	Member	State Constituency
Johor	Menteri Besar	Onn Hafiz Ghazi	Machap
Malacca	Chief Minister	Ab Rauf Yusoh	Tanjung Bidara
Negeri Sembilan	Menteri Besar	Ismail Lasim	Juasseh
Pahang	Menteri Besar	Wan Rosdy Wan Ismail	Jelai
Perak	Menteri Besar	Saarani Mohammad	Kota Tampan

State	Leader type	Member	State Constituency
Malacca	Senior EXCO	Rais Yasin	Paya Rumput
Perak	Senior EXCO	Mohd Zolkafly Harun	Lintang

UMNO has led most states during their Barisan Nasional rule except in Sarawak and Penang, while it never entered Sabah and Sarawak and never led Penang Alliance during Alliance era. Since BN defeat in 2018, it has entered various coalitions in states ruled by Muafakat Nasional/Perikatan Nasional between 2019 and 2022 as well as states ruled by Pakatan Harapan and GRS since 2022.

- Pahang (1957–present)
- Johor (1957–2018, 2020–present)
- Malacca (1957–2018, 2020–present)
- Perak (1957–2008, 2009–2018, 2020, 2020–present)
- Selangor (1957–2008, 2022–present)
- Penang (1957–1969, 1970–2008, 2022–present)
- Negeri Sembilan (1957–2018, 2022–2026, 2026–present)
- Sabah (1994–1996, 1996–1999, 1999–2001, 2001–2003, 2003–2018, 2020–2023, 2023–2025, 2025–present)
- Perlis (1957–2022)
- Kedah (1957–2008, 2013–2018, 2020–2022)
- Terengganu (1957–1999, 2004–2018, 2019–2022)
- Kelantan (1957–1959, 1970–1978, 1978–1990, 2019–2022)

Note: bold as Menteri Besar/Chief Minister, italic as junior partner

=== Ministerial posts ===
Portfolio	Office Bearer	Constituency
Deputy Prime Minister Minister of Rural and Regional Development Minister Responsible for National Disaster Management Agency	Ahmad Zahid Hamidi	Bagan Datuk
Minister of Foreign Affairs	Mohamad Hasan	Rembau
Minister of Defence	Mohamed Khaled Nordin	Kota Tinggi
Minister in the Prime Minister's Department (Law and Institutional Reform)	Azalina Othman Said	Pengerang
Minister of Higher Education	Zambry Abdul Kadir	Senator
Minister of Investment, Trade and Industry	Johari Abdul Ghani	Titiwangsa
Minister of Plantation and Commodities	Noraini Ahmad	Parit Sulong

Portfolio	Office Bearer	Constituency
Deputy Minister of Entrepreneur and Cooperatives Development	Mohamad Alamin	Kimanis
Deputy Minister of Works	Ahmad Maslan	Pontian
Deputy Minister of Home Affairs	Shamsul Anuar Nasarah	Lenggong
Deputy Minister of Energy Transition and Water Transformation	Abdul Rahman Mohamad	Lipis
Deputy Minister of Economy	Mohd Shahar Abdullah	Paya Besar

=== Legislative leadership ===
Portfolio	Office Bearer	Constituency
Deputy Speaker of the Dewan Rakyat	Ramli Mohd Nor	Cameron Highlands
Deputy President of the Dewan Negara	Nur Jazlan Mohamed	At-large

State	Leader type	Member	State Constituency
Johor	Deputy Speaker	Samsolbari Jamali	Semarang
Johor	Speaker	Zahari Sarip	Buloh Kasap
Malacca	Speaker	Ibrahim Durum	Non-MLA
Negeri Sembilan	Speaker	Awaludin Said	Non-MLA
Pahang	Speaker	Mohd Sharkar Shamsudin	Non-MLA
Perak	Speaker	Mohamad Zahir Abdul Khalid	Non-MLA
Sabah	Speaker	Kadzim M Yahya	Non-MLA

=== Official opposition ===
State	Leader type	Member	State Constituency
Kelantan	Opposition Leader	Mohd Syahbuddin Hashim	Galas

== Election results ==
=== General election results ===
Election	Total seats won	Seats contested	Total votes	Share of votes	Outcome of election	Election leader
1955	34 / 52	35	589,933	58.90%	▲34 seats; Governing coalition (Alliance Party)	Tunku Abdul Rahman
1959	52 / 104	70	553,160	35.75%	▲18 seats; Governing coalition (Alliance Party)	Tunku Abdul Rahman
1964	59 / 104	70	458,854	38.10%	▲7 seats; Governing coalition (Alliance Party)	Tunku Abdul Rahman
1969	52 / 144	70			▼7 seats; Governing coalition (Alliance Party)	Tunku Abdul Rahman
1974	62 / 144	80			▲10 seats; Governing coalition (Barisan Nasional)	Abdul Razak Hussein
1978	70 / 154	80			▲8 seats; Governing coalition (Barisan Nasional)	Hussein Onn
1982	70 / 154	100			; Governing coalition (Barisan Nasional)	Mahathir Mohamad
1986	83 / 177	100	1,474,063	31.06%	▲13 seats; Governing coalition (Barisan Nasional)	Mahathir Mohamad
1990	71 / 180	100			▼12 seat; Governing coalition (Barisan Nasional)	Mahathir Mohamad
1995	89 / 192	100			▲18 seats; Governing coalition (Barisan Nasional)	Mahathir Mohamad
1999	72 / 193	120			▼17 seats; Governing coalition (Barisan Nasional)	Mahathir Mohamad
2004	109 / 219	120	2,483,249	35.9%	▲37 seats; Governing coalition (Barisan Nasional)	Abdullah Ahmad Badawi
2008	79 / 222	120	2,381,725	29.33%	▼30 seats; Governing coalition (Barisan Nasional)	Abdullah Ahmad Badawi
2013	88 / 222	120	3,252,484	29.45%	▲9 seats; Governing coalition (Barisan Nasional)	Najib Razak
2018	54 / 222	120	2,548,251	21.10%	▼34 seats; Opposition coalition, later Governing coalition (Barisan Nasional)	Najib Razak
2022	26 / 222	119	2,549,341	16.43%	▼28 seats; Governing coalition (Barisan Nasional)	Ahmad Zahid Hamidi

=== State election results ===
State assembly	Election	Votes	%	Seats	Won/contested	+/–	Position (Note: As part of electoral coalition.)	Status
Perlis	2022	32,603	22.0	0 / 15	0 / 13	▼9	▼3rd (Barisan Nasional)	No seats
Kedah	2023	116,340	10.0	0 / 36	0 / 15	▼3	3rd (Barisan Nasional)	No seats
Kelantan	2023	178,347	20.9	1 / 45	1 / 31	▼7	2nd (Barisan Nasional)	Opposition
Terengganu	2023	197,972	28.7	0 / 32	0 / 27	▼10	2nd (Barisan Nasional)	No seats
Penang	2023	49,476	5.6	2 / 40	2 / 6	Steady	▼3rd (Barisan Nasional)	PH–BN
Perak	2022	300,539	20.3	8 / 59	8 / 38	▼19	▼3rd (Barisan Nasional)	BN–PH
Pahang	2022	290,855	33.5	16 / 42	16 / 34	▼8	▼2nd (Barisan Nasional)	BN–PH
Selangor	2023	246,053	9.2	2 / 56	2 / 12	▼2	▼3rd (Barisan Nasional)	PH–BN
Negeri Sembilan	2026	168,798	26.4	16 / 36	16 / 16	▲2	▲1st (Barisan Nasional)	BN–PN
Malacca	2026	207,711	42.5	18 / 28	18 / 18	Steady	1st (Barisan Nasional)	BN–PN
Johor	2026	766,262	40.9	36 / 56	36 / 37	▲3	1st (Barisan Nasional)	BN
Sabah	2025	130,648	11.6	5 / 73	5 / 41	▼9	▲3rd (Barisan Nasional)	GRS–PH–BN

Note

State election	State Legislative Assembly													
State election	Perlis	Kedah	Kelantan	Terengganu	Penang	Perak	Pahang	Selangor	Negeri Sembilan	Malacca	Johor	Sabah	Singapore (until 1965)	Total won / Total contested
2/3 majority	2 / 3	2 / 3	2 / 3	2 / 3	2 / 3	2 / 3	2 / 3	2 / 3	2 / 3	2 / 3	2 / 3	2 / 3	2 / 3	
1955													1 / 25	1 / 25
1959	10 / 12	18 / 24	1 / 30	5 / 24	10 / 24	21 / 40	17 / 24	14 / 28	11 / 24	13 / 20	20 / 32		3 / 51	
1964	9 / 12	18 / 24	8 / 30	20 / 24	10 / 24	22 / 40	17 / 24	13 / 28	14 / 24	13 / 20	20 / 32			
1969	9 / 12	12 / 24	10 / 30	12 / 24	4 / 24	18 / 40	16 / 24	12 / 28	11 / 24	11 / 20	19 / 32			54 / 68
1974	8 / 12	12 / 26	13 / 36	18 / 28	9 / 27	22 / 42	23 / 32	19 / 33	15 / 24	13 / 20	20 / 32			
1978	10 / 12	14 / 26	22 / 36	27 / 28	9 / 27	23 / 42	24 / 32	19 / 33	15 / 24	13 / 20	20 / 32			
1982	9 / 12	19 / 26	22 / 36	22 / 28	10 / 27	24 / 42	24 / 32	20 / 33	15 / 24	13 / 20	20 / 32			
1986	12 / 14	20 / 28	28 / 39	29 / 32	12 / 33	26 / 46	25 / 33	26 / 42	18 / 28	12 / 20	22 / 36			
1990	12 / 14	22 / 28	0 / 39	22 / 32	12 / 33	27 / 46	25 / 33	26 / 42	18 / 28	12 / 20	21 / 36			
1994												19 / 48		19 / 48
1995	13 / 15	26 / 36	6 / 43	24 / 32	12 / 33	30 / 52	28 / 38	30 / 48	20 / 32	16 / 25	25 / 40			
1999	10 / 15	16 / 36	2 / 43	4 / 32	10 / 33	26 / 52	21 / 38	26 / 48	20 / 32	16 / 25	25 / 40	24 / 48		
2004	12 / 15	23 / 36	21 / 45	27 / 32	14 / 40	34 / 59	31 / 42	35 / 56	22 / 36	18 / 28	33 / 56	32 / 60		
2008	12 / 15	12 / 36	6 / 45	23 / 32	11 / 40	27 / 59	29 / 42	18 / 56	19 / 36	18 / 28	32 / 56	32 / 60		
2013	12 / 15	19 / 36	12 / 45	17 / 32	10 / 40	30 / 59	28 / 42	12 / 56	21 / 36	17 / 28	32 / 56	31 / 60		
2018	9 / 15	3 / 36	8 / 45	10 / 32	2 / 40	25 / 59	24 / 42	4 / 56	15 / 36	13 / 28	14 / 56	17 / 60		145 / 587
2020												14 / 73		14 / 73
2021										18 / 28				18 / 28
2022											33 / 56			33 / 56
2022	0 / 15					8 / 59	17 / 42							25 / 85
2023		0 / 36	1 / 45	0 / 32	2 / 40			2 / 56	14 / 36					19 / 108
2025												5 / 73		5 / 41
2026									16 / 36	18 / 28	36 / 56			70 / 71

== See also ==
- Conservatism in Malaysia
- List of Islamic political parties

== Sources ==
- Chin, J (2018) From Ketuanan Melayu to Ketuanan Islam: UMNO and the Malaysian Chinese
- Welsh, B (ed). (2016) The End of UMNO?: Essays on Malaysia's dominant party
- Chin, James. (1999) "Going East: UMNO's entry into Sabah Politics". Asian Journal of Political Science, Vol 7, No 1 (June) 1999, pp. 20–40.
- Goh, Jenny (23 July 1997). "Small spark can create big mess". Straits Times.
- Kamarudin, Raja Petra (7 November 2005). "The stuff politicians are made of". Malaysia Today.
- Pillai, M.G.G. (3 November 2005). "National Front parties were not formed to fight for Malaysian independence". Malaysia Today.
- Ibrahim Mahmood (1981) Sejarah Perjuangan UMNO, Penerbitan Antara Kuala Lumpur
- "Pro-government Malaysian rally raises worry about ethnic tension – SWI swissinfo.ch". Archived from the original on 5 March 2016.
