= Mohd Soffi Abd Razak =

Malaysian politician

Yang Berhormat Dato' Sri Mohd Soffi Abdul Razak SSAP SIMP DSAP DIMP AMP MLA
- محمد صوفي بن عبدالرازق

Member of the Pahang State Executive Council (Publicity, Information, Communication and Technology : 8 April 2004–9 December 2004) (Housing and Growth Centres : 9 December 2004–12 March 2008) (Housing, Public Amenities and Transportation : 13 March 2008–15 May 2013) (Basic Amenities and Environment : 16 May 2013–14 May 2018) (Agriculture, Agro-Based Industry and Biotechnology : 5 June 2018–28 November 2022) (Plantation, Agro-based Industry, Biotechnology and Education : since 14 December 2022) (Note: Assumed portfolios 12 days after taking office.)
- Incumbent
- Assumed office 2 December 2022
- Monarch: Abdullah
- Menteri Besar: Wan Rosdy Wan Ismail
- Preceded by: Mohd Sharkar Shamsudin (Plantation, Biotechnology); Syed Ibrahim Syed Ahmad (Education); Himself (Agro-based Industry)
- Constituency: Benta
- In office 5 June 2018 – 28 November 2022
- Monarchs: Ahmad Shah (2018–2019); Abdullah (2019–2022)
- Menteri Besar: Wan Rosdy Wan Ismail
- Preceded by: Wan Rosdy Wan Ismail
- Succeeded by: Himself (Agro-based Industry)
- Constituency: Benta
- In office 8 April 2004 – 14 May 2018
- Monarch: Ahmad Shah
- Menteri Besar: Adnan Yaakob
- Preceded by: Ahmad Munawar Abdul Jalil
- Succeeded by: Norolazali Sulaiman (Basic Amenities); Mohd Sharkar Shamsudin (Environment)
- Constituency: Benta

Member of the Pahang State Legislative Assembly for Benta
- Incumbent
- Assumed office 29 November 1999
- Preceded by: Suhaimi Ibrahim (BN–UMNO)
- Majority: 268 (1999); 2,012 (2004); 1,358 (2008); 901 (2013); 340 (2018); 1,521 (2022)

Faction represented in Pahang State Legislative Assembly
- 1999–: Barisan Nasional

Personal details
- Born: 2 April 1956 (age 70) Benta, Lipis, Pahang, Federation of Malaya
- Citizenship: Malaysian
- Party: United Malays National Organisation (UMNO)
- Other political affiliations: Barisan Nasional (BN); Perikatan Nasional (PN) (aligned:2020–2022); Muafakat Nasional (MN); Pakatan Harapan (PH) (aligned:since 2022)
- Children: 5
- Occupation: Politician

Mohd. Soffi bin Abd. Razak is a Malaysian politician who has served as Member of the Pahang State Executive Council (EXCO) in the Barisan Nasional (BN) state administration under Menteris Besar Adnan Yaakob and Wan Rosdy Wan Ismail since April 2004 as well as Member of the Pahang State Legislative Assembly (MLA) for Benta since November 1999. He is a member of the United Malays National Organisation (UMNO), a component party of the BN coalition.

== Election results ==
Pahang State Legislative Assembly
Year	Constituency	Candidate	Votes	Pct	Opponent(s)	Votes	Pct	Ballots cast	Majority	Turnout
1999	N05 Benta	Mohd. Soffi Abd. Razak (UMNO)	2,686	52.63%	Amir Abd Aziz (keADILan)	2,418	47.37%	5,406	268	66.36%
2004	N05 Benta	Mohd. Soffi Abd. Razak (UMNO)	3,610	69.32%	Zakaria Abdul Hamid (keADILan)	1,598	30.68%	5,317	2,012	70.03%
2008	N05 Benta	Mohd. Soffi Abd. Razak (UMNO)	3,437	62.31%	Zakaria Abdul Hamid (PKR)	2,079	37.69%	5,648	1,358	74.33%
2013	N05 Benta	Mohd. Soffi Abd. Razak (UMNO)	3,833	56.66%	Rizal Jamin (PKR)	2,932	43.34%	6,858	901	83.00%
2018	N05 Benta	Mohd. Soffi Abd. Razak (UMNO)	3,261	47.12%	Sabaruddin Mohd Yassim (PKR)	2,921	42.20%	7,058	340	81.60%
2018	N05 Benta	Mohd. Soffi Abd. Razak (UMNO)	3,261	47.12%	Anuar Kassim (PAS)	739	10.68%	7,058	340	81.60%
2022	N05 Benta	Mohd. Soffi Abd. Razak (UMNO)	3,948	48.21%	Rizal Jamin (PKR)	2,427	29.64%	8,189	1,521	75.16%
2022	N05 Benta	Mohd. Soffi Abd. Razak (UMNO)	3,948	48.21%	Embong Nor Alias Ibrahim (PAS)	1,814	22.15%	8,189	1,521	75.16%

== Honours ==
- Pahang
  - Grand Knight of the Order of Sultan Ahmad Shah of Pahang (SSAP) – Dato' Sri (2014)
  - Grand Knight of the Order of the Crown of Pahang (SIMP) – Dato' Indera (2012)
  - Knight Companion of the Order of Sultan Ahmad Shah of Pahang (DSAP) – Dato' (2007)
  - Knight Companion of the Order of the Crown of Pahang (DIMP) – Dato' (2004)
  - Member of the Order of the Crown of Pahang (AMP)
