= Shahaniza Shamsuddin =

Malaysian politician

Yang Berbahagia Dato' Sri Shahaniza Shamsuddin SSAP DIMP
- شاة النساء شمس الدين

Member of the Pahang State Executive Council (Woman Development, Family, Communications and Multimedia : 16 May 2013–14 May 2018) (Culture, Unity, Community Welfare, Woman Development and Family : 15 May 2018–28 November 2022)
- In office 15 May 2018 – 28 November 2022
- Monarchs: Ahmad Shah (2018–2019); Abdullah (2019–2022)
- Menteri Besar: Wan Rosdy Wan Ismail
- Preceded by: Mohd Sharkar Shamsudin (Culture); Adnan Yaakob (Unity); Herself (Woman Development and Family)
- Succeeded by: Leong Yu Man (Culture and Unity); Sabariah Saidan (Community Welfare, Woman Development and Family)
- Constituency: Kuala Sentul
- In office 16 May 2013 – 14 May 2018
- Monarch: Ahmad Shah
- Menteri Besar: Adnan Yaakob
- Preceded by: Shafik Fauzan Sharif (Woman Development, Family)
- Succeeded by: Herself (Woman Development, Family); Mohd. Fakhruddin Mohd. Arif (Communications and Multimedia)
- Constituency: Kuala Sentul

Member of the Pahang State Legislative Assembly for Kuala Sentul
- In office 8 March 2008 – 19 November 2022
- Preceded by: Rosni Zahari (BN–UMNO)
- Succeeded by: Jasri Jamaludin (PN–BERSATU)
- Majority: 2,697 (2008); 3,293 (2013); 2,039 (2018)

Personal details
- Born: Shahaniza binti Samsuddin; 5 January 1970 (age 56) Mentakab, Pahang
- Citizenship: Malaysian
- Party: United Malays National Organisation (UMNO)
- Other political affiliations: Barisan Nasional (BN)
- Education: Sultan Alam Shah Islamic College
- Alma mater: Universiti Kebangsaan Malaysia
- Occupation: Politician

Shahaniza binti Shamsuddin (born 5 January 1970) is a Malaysian politician who served as Member of the Pahang State Executive Council (EXCO) in the Barisan Nasional (BN) state administration under Menteri Besar Adnan Yaakob and Wan Rosdy Wan Ismail from May 2013 to November 2022 and Member of the Pahang State Legislative Assembly (MLA) for Kuala Sentul from March 2008 to November 2022. She is a member and the Division Chief of Maran of the United Malays National Organisation (UMNO), a component party of the BN coalition.

== Election results ==
Pahang State Legislative Assembly
Year	Constituency	Candidate	Votes	Pct	Opponent(s)	Votes	Pct	Ballots cast	Majority	Turnout
2008	N25 Kuala Sentul	Shahaniza Shamsuddin (UMNO)	5,420	66.56%	Bostamin Bakar (PKR)	2,723	33.44%	8,369	2,697	76.77%
2013	N25 Kuala Sentul	Shahaniza Shamsuddin (UMNO)	6,901	65.67%	Mohamad Razali Ithnain (PKR)	3,608	34.33%	10,738	3,293	84.10%
2018	N25 Kuala Sentul	Shahaniza Shamsuddin (UMNO)	5,541	53.58%	Fazil Azmi Nadzri (PAS)	3,502	33.86%	10,564	2,039	79.10%
2018	N25 Kuala Sentul	Shahaniza Shamsuddin (UMNO)	5,541	53.58%	Bostamin Bakar (PKR)	1,299	12.56%	10,564	2,039	79.10%

Parliament of Malaysia
Year	Constituency	Candidate	Votes	Pct	Opponent(s)	Votes	Pct	Ballots cast	Majority	Turnout
2022	P086 Maran	Shahaniza Shamsuddin (UMNO)	17,779	43.27%	Ismail Abd Muttalib (PAS)	19,600	47.77%	41,092	1,821	77.35%
2022	P086 Maran	Shahaniza Shamsuddin (UMNO)	17,779	43.27%	Ahmad Shuhor Awang (AMANAH)	3,574	8.63%	41,092	1,821	77.35%
2022	P086 Maran	Shahaniza Shamsuddin (UMNO)	17,779	43.27%	Muhammad Hafiz Al-Hafiz (IND)	166	0.40%	41,092	1,821	77.35%

== Honours ==
- Pahang
  - Knight Grand Companion of the Order of Sultan Ahmad Shah of Pahang (SSAP) – Dato' Sri (2017)
  - Knight Companion of the Order of the Crown of Pahang (DIMP) – Dato' (2006)
