= Mohd Johari Hussain =

Malaysian politician

Yang Berhormat Dato' Sri Mohd Johari Hussain SSAP DIMP MLA
- محمد جوهري حسين

Member of the Pahang State Executive Council
- In office 15 May 2018 – 28 November 2022 (Human Resources, Youth, Sports and Non-governmental Organisations)
- Monarchs: Ahmad Shah (2018–2019); Abdullah (2019–2022)
- Menteri Besar: Wan Rosdy Wan Ismail
- Preceded by: Norol Azali Sulaiman (Human Resources); Himself (Youth and Sports)
- Succeeded by: Sim Chon Siang (Human Resources); Fadzli Mohamad Kamal (Youth, Sports and Non-governmental Organisations)
- Constituency: Tioman
- In office 16 May 2013 – 14 May 2018 (Youth and Sports)
- Monarch: Ahmad Shah
- Menteri Besar: Adnan Yaakob
- Preceded by: Wan Adnan Wan Mamat
- Succeeded by: Himself
- Constituency: Tioman

Member of the Pahang State Legislative Assembly for Tioman
- Incumbent
- Assumed office 8 March 2008
- Preceded by: Md Rusli Ismail (BN–UMNO)
- Majority: 2,614 (2008); 4,086 (2013); 1,280 (2018); 573 (2022)

Personal details
- Born: Mohd Johari bin Hussain; 3 January 1973 (age 53) Pahang, Malaysia
- Citizenship: Malaysian
- Party: United Malays National Organisation (UMNO)
- Other political affiliations: Barisan Nasional (BN)
- Occupation: Politician

Mohd Johari bin Hussain (born 3 January 1973) is a Malaysian politician who has served as Member of the Pahang State Legislative Assembly (MLA) for Tioman since March 2008. He served as Member of the Pahang State Executive Council in the Barisan Nasional (BN) state administrations under Menteris Besar Adnan Yaakob and Wan Rosdy Wan Ismail from May 2013 to November 2022. He is a member of the United Malays National Organisation (UMNO), a component party of the BN coalition.

== Election results ==
Pahang State Legislative Assembly
Year	Constituency	Candidate	Votes	Pct	Opponent(s)	Votes	Pct	Ballots cast	Majority	Turnout
2008	N42 Tioman	Mohd Johari Hussain (UMNO)	6,375	62.89%	Mohd Fadzli Mohd Ramly (PAS)	3,761	36.11%	10,376	2,614	77.08%
2013	N42 Tioman	Mohd Johari Hussain (UMNO)	8,883	64.60%	Mohd Fadzli Mohd Ramly (PAS)	4,797	34.88%	13,988	4,086	85.00%
2013	N42 Tioman	Mohd Johari Hussain (UMNO)	8,883	64.60%	Mohd Zolfakar Taib (IND)	71	0.52%	13,988	4,086	85.00%
2018	N42 Tioman	Mohd Johari Hussain (UMNO)	6,662	44.03%	Md Yunus Ramli (PAS)	5,382	35.57%	12,362	1,280	81.40%
2018	N42 Tioman	Mohd Johari Hussain (UMNO)	6,662	44.03%	Ahmad Sazili Mohd Nor (AMANAH)	3,029	20.02%	12,362	1,280	81.40%
2018	N42 Tioman	Mohd Johari Hussain (UMNO)	6,662	44.03%	Mohd Zolfakar Taib (IND)	58	0.38%	12,362	1,280	81.40%
2022	N42 Tioman	Mohd Johari Hussain (UMNO)	8,080	48.95%	Nor Idayu Hashim (PAS)	7,507	45.47%	16,508	573	58.39%
2022	N42 Tioman	Mohd Johari Hussain (UMNO)	8,080	48.95%	Mohd Fadzli Mohd Ramly (AMANAH) (Note: Withdrew after the Nomination Day in favor of BN candidate.)	784	4.75%	16,508	573	58.39%
2022	N42 Tioman	Mohd Johari Hussain (UMNO)	8,080	48.95%	Osman Bakar (PEJUANG)	79	0.48%	16,508	573	58.39%
2022	N42 Tioman	Mohd Johari Hussain (UMNO)	8,080	48.95%	Sulaiman Bakar (IND)	58	0.35%	16,508	573	58.39%

== Honours ==
- Pahang
  - Grand Knight of the Order of Sultan Ahmad Shah of Pahang (SSAP) – Dato' Sri (2017)
  - Knight Companion of the Order of the Crown of Pahang (DIMP) – Dato' (2009)
