= Shafik Fauzan Sharif =

Malaysian politician

Yang Berhormat Dato' Sri Shafik Fauzan Sharif SSAP DSAP DIMP SMP MLA
- شافق فوزان شريف

Exco roles (Pahang)
- 2008–2013: Chairman of the Tourism, Art, Heritage, Family Development and Woman Affairs
- 2013–2018: Chairman of the Rural Development, Agriculture and Agro-Based Industry

Faction represented in Pahang State Legislative Assembly
- 2004–: Barisan Nasional

Personal details
- Born: 1970 (age 55–56) Pahang, Malaysia
- Citizenship: Malaysian
- Party: United Malays National Organisation (UMNO)
- Other political affiliations: Barisan Nasional (BN); Perikatan Nasional (PN); Muafakat Nasional (MN)
- Occupation: Politician

Shafik Fauzan Sharif is a Malaysian politician and served as Pahang State Executive Councillor.

== Election results ==
Pahang State Legislative Assembly
Year	Constituency	Candidate	Votes	Pct	Opponent(s)	Votes	Pct	Ballots cast	Majority	Turnout
2004	N16 Inderapura	Shafik Fauzan Sharif (UMNO)	3,634	59.56%	Abdul Aziz Long (PAS)	2,467	40.44%	6,245	1,167	79.54%
2008	N16 Inderapura	Shafik Fauzan Sharif (UMNO)	3,791	56.51%	Syed Abdul Rahman Syed Hussain (PAS)	2,918	43.49%	6,820	873	79.77%
2013	N16 Inderapura	Shafik Fauzan Sharif (UMNO)	5,644	60.40%	Syed Mohamad Anis Syed Hussain (PAS)	3,700	39.60%	9,457	1,944	88.90%
2018	N16 Inderapura	Shafik Fauzan Sharif (UMNO)	5,568	51.67%	Wan Maseri Wan Mohd (PAS)	3,403	31.57%	11,053	2,165	86.10%
2018	N16 Inderapura	Shafik Fauzan Sharif (UMNO)	5,568	51.67%	Fakhrul Anuar Zulkawi (PKR)	1,806	16.76%	11,053	2,165	86.10%
2022	N16 Inderapura	Shafik Fauzan Sharif (UMNO)	7,029	46.15%	Mohd Hafizal Mohamed Shah (PAS)	6,107	40.10%	15,408	922	83.03%
2022	N16 Inderapura	Shafik Fauzan Sharif (UMNO)	7,029	46.15%	Fakhrul Anuar Zulkawi (PKR)	2,030	13.33%	15,408	922	83.03%
2022	N16 Inderapura	Shafik Fauzan Sharif (UMNO)	7,029	46.15%	Norashikin Ismail (PEJUANG)	64	0.42%	15,408	922	83.03%

== Honours ==
- Pahang
  - Companion of the Order of the Crown of Pahang (SMP) (2007)
  - Knight Companion of the Order of the Crown of Pahang (DIMP) – Dato' (2008)
  - Knight Companion of the Order of Sultan Ahmad Shah of Pahang (DSAP) – Dato' (2012)
  - Grand Knight of the Order of Sultan Ahmad Shah of Pahang (SSAP) – Dato' Sri (2017)
