= Sabariah Saidan =

Malaysian politician

Yang Berhormat Dato' Sabariah Saidan DIMP SMP MLA
- صبرية سعيدان

Member of the Pahang State Executive Council (Community Welfare, Women and Family Development : since 14 December 2022) (Note: Assumed portfolios 12 days after taking office.)
- Incumbent
- Assumed office 2 December 2022
- Monarch: Abdullah
- Menteri Besar: Wan Rosdy Wan Ismail
- Preceded by: Shahaniza Shamsuddin
- Constituency: Guai

Member of the Pahang State Legislative Assembly for Guai
- Incumbent
- Assumed office 19 November 2022
- Preceded by: Norol Azali Sulaiman (BN–UMNO)
- Majority: 2,678 (2022)

Personal details
- Born: 9 January 1968 (age 58) Pahang, Malaysia
- Citizenship: Malaysian
- Party: United Malays National Organisation (UMNO)
- Other political affiliations: Barisan Nasional (BN)
- Occupation: Politician

Sabariah binti Saidan (born 9 January 1968) is a Malaysian politician and served as Pahang State Executive Councillor since December 2022. She is the Member of the Pahang State Legislative Assembly (MLA) for Guai since November 2022. She is a member and the Division Women Chief of Bera of the United Malays National Organisation (UMNO), a component party of the Barisan Nasional (BN) coalition.

== Election results ==
Pahang State Legislative Assembly
Year	Constituency	Candidate	Votes	Pct	Opponent(s)	Votes	Pct	Ballots cast	Majority	Turnout
2022	N37 Guai	Sabariah Saidan (UMNO)	9,425	49.46%	Nor Hashimah Mat Noh (BERSATU)	6,747	35.41%	19,407	2,678	79.5%
2022	N37 Guai	Sabariah Saidan (UMNO)	9,425	49.46%	Noraini Abdul Ghani (AMANAH)	1,906	10.00%	19,407	2,678	79.5%
2022	N37 Guai	Sabariah Saidan (UMNO)	9,425	49.46%	Jafari Mohd Yusof (IND)	977	5.13%	19,407	2,678	79.5%

== Honours ==
- Pahang
  - Knight Companion of the Order of the Crown of Pahang (DIMP) – Dato' (2016)
  - Companion of the Order of the Crown of Pahang (SMP)
