= Bera (federal constituency) =

Federal constituency of Pahang, Malaysia

Bera (P090)
Pahang constituency

Federal constituency
- Legislature: Dewan Rakyat
- MP: Ismail Sabri Yaakob; BN
- Constituency created: 2003
- First contested: 2004
- Last contested: 2022

Demographics
- Population (2020): 97,963
- Electors (2022): 77,669
- Area (km²): 2,205
- Pop. density (per km²): 44.4

Bera is a federal constituency in Bera District, Pahang, Malaysia, that has been represented in the Dewan Rakyat since 2004.

The federal constituency was created in the 2003 redistribution and is mandated to return a single member to the Dewan Rakyat under the first past the post voting system.

== Demographics ==
彭亨国席 Pahang - 马来西亚第15届全国大选 | 中國報

Ethnic breakdown of Bera's electorate as of 2022
1. Malay (62.6%)
2. Chinese (27.4%)
3. Other ethnicities (6.70%)
4. Indian (3.60%)

As of 2020, Bera has a population of 97,963 people.

Age breakdown of Bera's electorate as of 2022
1. 18-20 (5.73%)
2. 21-29 (20.4%)
3. 30-39 (25.9%)
4. 40-49 (18.2%)
5. 50-59 (12.7%)
6. 60-69 (9.59%)
7. 70-79 (5.77%)
8. 80-89 (1.44%)
9. above 90 (0.81%)
Gender breakdown of Bera's electorate as of 2022
1. Male (51.3%)
2. Female (48.7%)

== History ==
=== Polling districts ===
According to the federal gazette issued on 31 October 2022, the Bera constituency is divided into 36 polling districts.

State constituency	Polling district	Code	Location
Guai（N37）	Charok Putting	090/37/01	SK Charuk Putting
Guai（N37）	Batu Bor	090/37/02	SK Batu Bor
Guai（N37）	Bohor Baharu	090/37/03	SK Bohor Baharu
Guai（N37）	FELDA Purun	090/37/04	SK LKTP Purun
Guai（N37）	FELDA Mayam	090/37/05	SK LKTP Mayam
Guai（N37）	FELDA Kumai	090/37/06	SK LKTP Kumai
Guai（N37）	FELDA Bukit Kepayang	090/37/07	SK LKTP Bukit Kepayang
Guai（N37）	Bukit Rok	090/37/08	SK Bukit Rok
Guai（N37）	Kuala Bera	090/38/09	SK Batu Papan
Guai（N37）	Kuala Triang	090/37/10	SK Kuala Triang
Guai（N37）	Senyum Jempol	090/37/11	SK Guai
Guai（N37）	Durian Tawar	090/37/12	SK Durian Tawar
Guai（N37）	Mengkarak	090/37/13	SJK (C) Mengkarak
Guai（N37）	Padang Luas	090/37/14	SMK Seri Bera
Triang（N38）	Ladang Menteri	090/38/01	SJK (C) Ladang Menteri
Triang（N38）	Kerayong	090/38/02	SMK Bandar Kerayong
Triang（N38）	Taman Sentosa	090/38/03	SJK (C) Triang 2
Triang（N38）	Bandar Triang	090/38/04	SMJK Triang
Triang（N38）	Kampung Baru Triang	090/38/05	SJK (C) Triang 1
Triang（N38）	Sri Buntar	090/38/06	SK Sri Buntar
Triang（N38）	Mengkuang	090/38/07	SJK (C) Mengkuang
Triang（N38）	FELDA Bukit Puchong	090/38/08	SK LKTP Bukit Puchong
Triang（N38）	FELDA Bukit Mendi	090/39/09	SK LKTP Bukit Mendi
Kemayan（N39）	Bukit Gemuroh	090/39/01	SK Bukit Gemuruh
Kemayan（N39）	FELDA Triang Dua & Tiga	090/39/02	SMK Triang 3
Kemayan（N39）	FELDA Tementi	090/39/03	SK LKTP Tementi
Kemayan（N39）	FELDA Rentam	090/39/04	SK LKTP Rentam
Kemayan（N39）	FELDA Sebertak	090/39/05	SK LKTP Sebertak
Kemayan（N39）	FELDA Bera Selatan	090/39/06	Dewan Orang Ramai Bera Selatan 7
Kemayan（N39）	Kampung Pasal	090/39/07	Dewan Kampung Pasal
Kemayan（N39）	Pos Iskandar	090/39/08	SK Iskandar
Kemayan（N39）	FELDA Tembagau	090/39/09	SK LKTP Tembagau 1
Kemayan（N39）	FELDA Triang Satu	090/39/10	SK LKTP Triang 2
Kemayan（N39）	Kampung Dato Seri Hamzah	090/39/11	SK Kemayan
Kemayan（N39）	Kemayan	090/39/12	SMK Kemayan
Kemayan（N39）	Ladang Kemayan	090/39/13	SJK (C) Kemayan

=== Representation history ===
Members of Parliament for Bera
Parliament	No	Years	Member	Party	Vote Share
Constituency created, renamed from Temerluh
11th	P090	2004–2008	Ismail Sabri Yaakob (إسماعيل صبري يعقوب)	BN (UMNO)	17,572; 58.26%
12th	P090	2008–2013	Ismail Sabri Yaakob (إسماعيل صبري يعقوب)	BN (UMNO)	18,297; 56.68%
13th	P090	2013–2018	Ismail Sabri Yaakob (إسماعيل صبري يعقوب)	BN (UMNO)	21,669; 51.76%
14th	P090	2018–2022	Ismail Sabri Yaakob (إسماعيل صبري يعقوب)	BN (UMNO)	20,760; 43.89%
15th	P090	2022–present	Ismail Sabri Yaakob (إسماعيل صبري يعقوب)	BN (UMNO)	31,762; 53.54%

=== State constituency ===
Parliamentary constituency	State constituency						
Parliamentary constituency	1955–59*	1959–1974	1974–1986	1986–1995	1995–2004	2004–2018	2018–present
Bera						Guai	
Bera						Kemayan	
Bera						Triang	

=== Historical boundaries ===
State Constituency	Area	
State Constituency	2003	2018
Guai	FELDA Mayam; FELDA Purun; Kampung Guai; Kuala Bera; Mengkarak	
Triang	FELDA Tembagau; FELDA Triang; FELDA Rentam; Kampung Pasal; Kemayan	
Kemayan	Bera; FELDA Bukit Mendi; Kerayong; Mengkuang; Triang	

=== Current state assembly members ===
No.	State Constituency	Member	Coalition (Party)
N37	Guai	Sabariah Saidan	BN (UMNO)
N38	Triang	Leong Yu Man	PH (DAP)
N39	Kemayan	Khaizulnizam Mohamad Zuldin	BN (UMNO)

=== Local governments & postcodes ===
No.	State Constituency	Local Government	Postcode
N37	Guai	Bera District Council	28000 Temerloh; 28100 Chenor; 28200 Bandar Bera; 28300, 28310, 28320 Triang; 28340, 28380 Kemayan; 28740 Bentong
N38	Triang	Bera District Council	28000 Temerloh; 28100 Chenor; 28200 Bandar Bera; 28300, 28310, 28320 Triang; 28340, 28380 Kemayan; 28740 Bentong
N39	Kemayan	Bera District Council	28000 Temerloh; 28100 Chenor; 28200 Bandar Bera; 28300, 28310, 28320 Triang; 28340, 28380 Kemayan; 28740 Bentong

== Election results ==
Malaysian general election, 2022
Party	Candidate	Votes	%	∆%
BN	Ismail Sabri Yaakob	31,762	53.34	▲9.45
PH	Abas Awang	15,067	25.30	▼13.70
PN	Asmawi Harun	12,719	21.36	▲21.36
Total valid votes		59,548	100.00	
Total rejected ballots		814		
Unreturned ballots		145		
Turnout		60,507	77.90	▼4.43
Registered electors		77,669		
Majority		16,695	28.04	▲23.15
BN hold		Swing		
Source(s) https://lom.agc.gov.my/ilims/upload/portal/akta/outputp/1753278/PUB611_2022.pdf

Malaysian general election, 2018
Party	Candidate	Votes	%	∆%
BN	Ismail Sabri Yaakob	20,760	43.89	▼7.87
PH	Zakaria Abdul Hamid	18,449	39.00	▲39.00
PAS	Musaniff Ab Rahman	8,096	17.11	▲17.11
Total valid votes		47,305	100.00	
Total rejected ballots		767		
Unreturned ballots		267		
Turnout		48,339	82.33	▼1.88
Registered electors		58,711		
Majority		2,311	4.89	▼0.23
BN hold		Swing		
Source(s) "His Majesty's Government Gazette - Notice of Contested Election, Parliament for the State of Pahang [P.U. (B) 238/2018]" (PDF). Attorney General's Chambers of Malaysia. 3 May 2018. "Federal Government Gazette - Results of Contested Election and Statements of the Poll after the Official Addition of Votes, Parliamentary Constituencies for the State of Pahang [P.U. (B) 312/2018]" (PDF). Attorney General's Chambers of Malaysia. 28 May 2018.

Malaysian general election, 2013
Party	Candidate	Votes	%	∆%
BN	Ismail Sabri Yaakob	21,669	51.76	▼4.92
PKR	Zakaria Abdul Hamid	19,526	46.64	▲46.64
Independent	Mohd Wali Ahmad	670	1.60	▲1.60
Total valid votes		41,865	100.00	
Total rejected ballots		965		
Unreturned ballots		114		
Turnout		42,944	84.21	▲7.17
Registered electors		50,997		
Majority		2,143	5.12	▼8.24
BN hold		Swing		
Source(s) "Federal Government Gazette - Notice of Contested Election, Parliament for the State of Pahang [P.U. (B) 175/2013]" (PDF). Attorney General's Chambers of Malaysia. 26 April 2013. "Federal Government Gazette - Results of Contested Election and Statements of the Poll after the Official Addition of Votes, Parliamentary Constituencies for the State of Pahang [P.U. (B) 216/2013]" (PDF). Attorney General's Chambers of Malaysia. 22 May 2013. Archived from the original (PDF) on 1 July 2019.

Malaysian general election, 2008
Party	Candidate	Votes	%	∆%
BN	Ismail Sabri Yaakob	18,297	56.68	▼1.58
PAS	Mazlan Aliman	13,984	43.32	▲1.58
Total valid votes		32,281	100.00	
Total rejected ballots		783		
Unreturned ballots		59		
Turnout		33,123	77.04	▲0.51
Registered electors		42,993		
Majority		4,313	13.36	▼3.16
BN hold		Swing		

Malaysian general election, 2004
Party	Candidate	Votes	%
BN	Ismail Sabri Yaakob	17,572	58.26
PAS	Ab Wahab Ismail	12,590	41.74
Total valid votes		30,162	100.00
Total rejected ballots		907	
Unreturned ballots		27	
Turnout		31,096	76.53
Registered electors		40,632	
Majority		4,982	16.52
This was a new constituency created.
