= Kuala Sentul (state constituency) =

Political subdivision in Malaysia

Kuala Sentul (N25)
Pahang constituency

State constituency
- Legislature: Pahang State Legislative Assembly
MLA
Jasri Jamaludin
PN
- Constituency created: 2003
- First contested: 2004
- Last contested: 2022

Demographics
- Electors (2022): 17,434

Kuala Sentul is a state constituency in Pahang, Malaysia, that is represented in the Pahang State Legislative Assembly.

== Demographics ==
Ethnic breakdown of Kuala Sentul's electorate as of 2022
1. Malay (89.7%)
2. Chinese (5.62%)
3. Other ethnicities (2.83%)
4. Indian (1.90%)

== History ==
=== Polling districts ===
According to the federal gazette issued on 30 October 2022, the Kuala Sentul constituency is divided into 8 polling districts.

| State constituency | Polling districts | Code | Location |
|---|---|---|---|
| Kuala Sentul (N25) | FELDA Jengka 1 | 086/25/01 | SK LKTP Jengka 1 |
| Kuala Sentul (N25) | Sungai Jerik | 086/25/02 | SJK (C) Jerik |
| Kuala Sentul (N25) | Kuala Sentul | 086/25/03 | SK Kuala Sentul |
| Kuala Sentul (N25) | FELDA Jengka 5 | 086/25/04 | SK LKTP Jengka 5 |
| Kuala Sentul (N25) | FELDA Jengka 4 | 086/25/05 | SK LKTP Jengka 4 |
| Kuala Sentul (N25) | FELDA Jengka 3 | 086/25/06 | SK LKTP Jengka 3 |
| Kuala Sentul (N25) | FELDA Jengka 2 | 086/25/07 | SK LKTP Jengka 2 |
| Kuala Sentul (N25) | Ulu Jempol | 086/25/08 | SK LKTP Ulu Jempol |

=== Representation history ===
Members of the Legislative Assembly for Kuala Sentul
| Assembly | No | Years | Name | Party |
Constituency created from Hulu Jempul and Jengka
| 11th | N25 | 2004-2008 | Rosni Zahari | BN (UMNO) |
| 12th | N25 | 2008-2013 | Shahaniza Shamsuddin | BN (UMNO) |
| 13th | N25 | 2013-2018 | Shahaniza Shamsuddin | BN (UMNO) |
| 14th | N25 | 2018-2022 | Shahaniza Shamsuddin | BN (UMNO) |
| 15th | N25 | 2022–present | Jasri Jamaludin | PN (BERSATU) |

== Election results ==
Pahang state election, 2022
| Party | Candidate | Votes | % | ∆% |
|---|---|---|---|---|
| PN | Jasri Jamaludin | 6,016 | 46.23 | ▲46.23 |
| BN | Khairuddin Ali Hanafiah | 5,775 | 44.38 | ▼9.20 |
| PH | Amran Tahir | 1,223 | 9.40 | ▲9.40 |
| Total valid votes | | 13,014 | 100.00 | |
| Total rejected ballots | | 181 | | |
| Unreturned ballots | | 36 | | |
| Turnout | | 13,231 | 75.89 | ▼3.18 |
| Registered electors | | 17,434 | | |
| Majority | | 241 | 1.85 | ▼17.86 |
| PN gain from BN | | Swing | | ? |

Pahang state election, 2018
| Party | Candidate | Votes | % | ∆% |
|---|---|---|---|---|
| BN | Shahaniza Shamsuddin | 5,541 | 53.58 | ▼12.09 |
| PAS | Fazil Azmi Nadzri | 3,502 | 33.86 | ▲33.86 |
| PKR | Bostamin Bakar | 1,299 | 12.56 | ▼21.77 |
| Total valid votes | | 10,342 | 100.00 | |
| Total rejected ballots | | 178 | | |
| Unreturned ballots | | 44 | | |
| Turnout | | 10,564 | 79.07 | ▼5.02 |
| Registered electors | | 13,360 | | |
| Majority | | 2,039 | 19.72 | ▼11.62 |
| BN hold | | Swing | | |

Pahang state election, 2013
| Party | Candidate | Votes | % | ∆% |
|---|---|---|---|---|
| BN | Shahaniza Shamsuddin | 6,901 | 65.67 | ▼0.89 |
| PKR | Mohamad Razali Ithnain | 3,608 | 34.33 | ▲0.89 |
| Total valid votes | | 10,509 | 100.00 | |
| Total rejected ballots | | 229 | | |
| Unreturned ballots | | 40 | | |
| Turnout | | 10,778 | 84.09 | ▲7.32 |
| Registered electors | | 12,817 | | |
| Majority | | 3,293 | 31.34 | ▼1.79 |
| BN hold | | Swing | | |

Pahang state election, 2008
| Party | Candidate | Votes | % | ∆% |
|---|---|---|---|---|
| BN | Shahaniza Shamsuddin | 5,420 | 66.56 | ▼2.36 |
| PKR | Bostamin Bakar | 2,723 | 33.44 | ▲2.36 |
| Total valid votes | | 8,143 | 100.00 | |
| Total rejected ballots | | 209 | | |
| Unreturned ballots | | 17 | | |
| Turnout | | 8,369 | 76.77 | ▼0.48 |
| Registered electors | | 10,901 | | |
| Majority | | 2,697 | 33.12 | ▼4.73 |
| BN hold | | Swing | | |

Pahang state election, 2004
| Party | Candidate | Votes | % |
|---|---|---|---|
| BN | Rosni Zahari | 5,463 | 68.93 |
| PKR | Ahmad Nizam Hamid | 2,463 | 31.07 |
| Total valid votes | | 7,926 | 100.00 |
| Total rejected ballots | | 174 | |
| Unreturned ballots | | 37 | |
| Turnout | | 8,137 | 77.25 |
| Registered electors | | 10,533 | |
| Majority | | 3,000 | 37.85 |
This was a new constituency created.
