= Benta (state constituency) =

Political subdivision in Malaysia

Benta (N05)
Pahang constituency

State constituency
- Legislature: Pahang State Legislative Assembly
MLA
Mohd Soffi Abd Razak
BN
- Constituency created: 1974
- First contested: 1974
- Last contested: 2022

Demographics
- Electors (2022): 10,895

Benta is a state constituency in Pahang, Malaysia, that has been represented in the Pahang State Legislative Assembly.

== Demographics ==
Ethnic breakdown of Benta's electorate as of 2022
1. Malay (63.6%)
2. Chinese (26.9%)
3. Indian (8.71%)
4. Other ethnicities (0.83%)

== History ==
=== Polling districts ===
According to the federal gazette issued on 31 October 2022, the Lipis constituency is divided into 42 polling districts.

State constituency	Polling district	Code	Location
Benta（N05）	Kampung Lalang	079/05/01	Balai Raya Kampung Lalang
Benta（N05）	Rengai	079/05/02	Kolej Vokesional Sultan Haji Ahmad Shah Al-Musta'in Billah
Benta（N05）	Tanjung Besar	079/05/03	SK Tanjung Besar
Benta（N05）	Jeransang	079/05/04	SK Jeransang
Benta（N05）	Kemahang	079/05/05	SK Kemahang
Benta（N05）	Kampung Chat	079/05/06	SK Chat
Benta（N05）	Budu	079/05/07	SMK Panglima Garang Abdul Samad
Benta（N05）	Pekan Benta	079/05/08	SK Benta
Benta（N05）	Kampung Baru Benta	079/05/09	SMK Benta
Benta（N05）	Jerkoh	079/05/10	SJK (C) Jerkoh
Benta（N05）	Ladang Benta	079/05/11	SJK (T) Ladang Benta
Benta（N05）	Ladang Budu	079/05/12	SJK (T) Ladang Budu

=== Representation history ===
Members of the Legislative Assembly for Benta
Assembly	No	Years	Name	Party
Constituency created from Tanjong Besar and Kuala Lipis
4th	N05	1974-1978	Zakaria Taha	BN (UMNO)
5th	N05	1978-1982	Zuki Kamaluddin	BN (UMNO)
6th	N05	1982-1986	Zuki Kamaluddin	BN (UMNO)
7th	N05	1986-1990	Zuki Kamaluddin	BN (UMNO)
8th	N05	1990-1995	Zuki Kamaluddin	BN (UMNO)
9th	N05	1995-1999	Suhaimi Ibrahim	BN (UMNO)
10th	N05	1999-2004	Mohd Soffi Abd Razak	BN (UMNO)
11th	N05	2004-2008	Mohd Soffi Abd Razak	BN (UMNO)
12th	N05	2008-2013	Mohd Soffi Abd Razak	BN (UMNO)
13th	N05	2013-2018	Mohd Soffi Abd Razak	BN (UMNO)
14th	N05	2018-2022	Mohd Soffi Abd Razak	BN (UMNO)
15th	N05	2022-present	Mohd Soffi Abd Razak	BN (UMNO)

== Election results ==
Pahang state election, 2022
Party	Candidate	Votes	%	∆%
BN	Mohd Soffi Abd Razak	3,948	48.21	▲1.09
PH	Rizal Jamin	2,427	29.64	▲29.64
PN	Nor Alias Ibrahim	1,814	22.15	▲22.15
Total valid votes		8,189	100.00	
Total rejected ballots		74		
Unreturned ballots		18		
Turnout		8,281	76.00	▼5.58
Registered electors		10,895		
Majority		1,521	18.57	▲13.66
BN hold		Swing		

Pahang state election, 2018
Party	Candidate	Votes	%	∆%
BN	Mohd Soffi Abd Razak	3,261	47.12	▼9.54
PKR	Sabaruddin Mohd Yassim	2,921	42.20	▼1.14
PAS	Anuar Kassim	739	10.68	▲10.68
Total valid votes		6,921	100.00	
Total rejected ballots		105		
Unreturned ballots		32		
Turnout		7,058	81.58	▼1.45
Registered electors		8,652		
Majority		340	4.91	▼8.41
BN hold		Swing		
Source(s) "Pahang - 14th General Election Malaysia (GE14 / PRU14)". The Star.

Pahang state election, 2013
Party	Candidate	Votes	%	∆%
BN	Mohd Soffi Abdul Razak	3,833	56.66	▼5.65
PKR	Rizal Jamin	2,932	43.34	▲5.65
Total valid votes		6,765	100.00	
Total rejected ballots		93		
Unreturned ballots		40		
Turnout		6,898	83.03	▲8.70
Registered electors		8,308		
Majority		901	13.32	▼11.30
BN hold		Swing		

Pahang state election, 2008
Party	Candidate	Votes	%	∆%
BN	Mohd Soffi Abdul Razak	3,437	62.31	▼7.01
PKR	Zakaria Abdul Hamid	2,079	37.69	▲7.01
Total valid votes		5,516	100.00	
Total rejected ballots		109		
Unreturned ballots		23		
Turnout		5,648	74.33	▲4.30
Registered electors		7,599		
Majority		1,358	24.62	▼14.01
BN hold		Swing		

Pahang state election, 2004
Party	Candidate	Votes	%	∆%
BN	Mohd Soffi Abdul Razak	3,610	69.32	▲16.69
PKR	Zakaria Abdul Hamid	1,598	30.68	▲30.68
Total valid votes		5,208	100.00	
Total rejected ballots		109		
Unreturned ballots		0		
Turnout		5,317	70.03	▲3.67
Registered electors		7,593		
Majority		2,012	38.63	▲33.38
BN hold		Swing		

Pahang state election, 1999
Party	Candidate	Votes	%	∆%
BN	Mohd Soffi Abdul Razak	2,686	52.63	▼18.64
PKR	Amir Abd Aziz	2,418	47.37	▲47.37
Total valid votes		5,104	100.00	
Total rejected ballots		217		
Unreturned ballots		85		
Turnout		5,406	66.36	▼3.84
Registered electors		8,147		
Majority		268	5.25	▼37.28
BN hold		Swing		

Pahang state election, 1995
Party	Candidate	Votes	%	∆%
BN	Suhaimi Ibrahim	4,124	71.26	▲6.34
S46	Mohd Jaafar Kamarulzaman	1,663	28.74	▲28.74
Total valid votes		5,787	100.00	
Total rejected ballots		174		
Unreturned ballots		182		
Turnout		6,143	70.20	▲2.68
Registered electors		8,751		
Majority		2,461	42.53	▲12.69
BN hold		Swing		

Pahang state election, 1990
Party	Candidate	Votes	%	∆%
BN	Mohd Zuki Kamaluddin	3,144	64.92	▼2.32
All Malaysian Indian Progressive Front	Telukanam Sinnapayan	1,699	35.08	▲35.08
Total valid votes		4,843	100.00	
Total rejected ballots		280		
Unreturned ballots		0		
Turnout		5,123	67.51	▲1.83
Registered electors		7,588		
Majority		1,445	29.84	▼14.37
BN hold		Swing		

Pahang state election, 1986
Party	Candidate	Votes	%	∆%
BN	Mohd Zuki Kamaluddin	3,142	67.24	▼13.20
DAP	Selvarajah Maniam	1,076	23.03	▲23.03
PAS	Shamsuddin Mohd Salleh	455	9.74	▼9.82
Total valid votes		4,673	100.00	
Total rejected ballots		184		
Unreturned ballots		0		
Turnout		4,857	65.68	▼6.64
Registered electors		7,395		
Majority		2,066	44.21	▼16.67
BN hold		Swing		

Pahang state election, 1982
Party	Candidate	Votes	%	∆%
BN	Mohd Zuki Kamaluddin	3,685	80.44	▲10.13
PAS	Hamzah Hussain	896	19.56	▲10.05
Total valid votes		4,581	100.00	
Total rejected ballots		217		
Unreturned ballots		0		
Turnout		4,798	72.32	▼2.55
Registered electors		6,634		
Majority		2,789	60.88	▲10.75
BN hold		Swing		

Pahang state election, 1978
Party	Candidate	Votes	%
BN	Mohd Zuki Kamaluddin	3,031	70.31
Parti Sosialis Rakyat Malaysia	Ahmad Mahir Ibrahim	870	20.18
PAS	Mukhtar Ab Rahman	410	9.51
Total valid votes		4,311	100.00
Total rejected ballots		269	
Unreturned ballots		0	
Turnout		4,580	74.87
Registered electors		6,117	
Majority		2,161	50.13
BN hold		Swing	

Pahang state election, 1974
Party	Candidate	Votes	%	∆%
BN	Zakaria Tahar	2,560	61.75	▼7.53
Parti Sosialis Rakyat Malaysia	Ibrahim Shaikh	1,586	38.25	▲38.25
Total valid votes		4,146	100.00	
Total rejected ballots		122		
Unreturned ballots		0		
Turnout		4,268	77.83	▲4.77
Registered electors		5,484		
Majority		974	23.49	▼15.05
This was a new constituency created.
