= Tioman (state constituency) =

Political subdivision in Malaysia

Tioman (N42)
Pahang constituency

State constituency
- Legislature: Pahang State Legislative Assembly
MLA
Mohd Johari Hussain
BN
- Constituency created: 1984
- First contested: 1986
- Last contested: 2022

Demographics
- Electors (2022): 28,465

Tioman is a state constituency in Pahang, Malaysia, that is represented in the Pahang State Legislative Assembly.

== Demographics ==
Ethnic breakdown of Tioman's electorate as of 2022
1. Malay (83.9%)
2. Other ethnicities (9.05%)
3. Chinese (6.62%)
4. Indian (0.43%)

== History ==
=== Polling districts ===
According to the federal gazette issued on 31 October 2022, the Tioman constituency is divided into 15 polling districts.

State constituency	Polling district	Code	Location
Tioman（N42）	Sungai Puteri	091/42/01	SK Sungai Puteri
Tioman（N42）	Kuala Rompin	091/42/02	SMK Rompin
Tioman（N42）	Bandar Baru Rompin	091/42/03	SK Rompin
Tioman（N42）	Pontian	091/42/04	SK Pontian
Tioman（N42）	FELDA Selendang	091/42/05	SK LKTP Selendang 1; SK Sungai Mok
Tioman（N42）	Sarang Tiong	091/42/06	SK Sarang Tiong
Tioman（N42）	Kampung Janglau	091/42/07	SK Janglau
Tioman（N42）	Kampung Jawa	091/42/08	SMK Tanjung Gemok
Tioman（N42）	Endau	091/42/09	SK Tanjung Gemok
Tioman（N42）	Pianggu	091/42/10	SK Pianggu
Tioman（N42）	Denai	091/42/11	SK Denai
Tioman（N42）	Tekek	091/42/12	SMK Tekek; Salang Pusaka Resort Tioman
Tioman（N42）	Juara	091/42/13	SK Juara
Tioman（N42）	Kampung Genting	091/42/14	Balai Raya Kampung Genting
Tioman（N42）	Mukut	091/42/15	SK Mukut

=== Representation history ===
Members of the Legislative Assembly for Tioman
Assembly	No	Years	Name	Party
Constituency created from Rompin and Bukit Ibam
7th	N33	1986–1990	Hasan Arifin	BN (UMNO)
8th	N33	1990–1995	Mustafar Abu Bakar	BN (UMNO)
9th	N38	1995–1999	Mustafar Abu Bakar	BN (UMNO)
10th	N38	1999–2004	Mustafar Abu Bakar	BN (UMNO)
11th	N42	2004–2008	Md Rusli Ismail	BN (UMNO)
12th	N42	2008–2013	Mohd Johari Hussain	BN (UMNO)
13th	N42	2013–2018	Mohd Johari Hussain	BN (UMNO)
14th	N42	2018–2022	Mohd Johari Hussain	BN (UMNO)
15th	N42	2022–present	Mohd Johari Hussain	BN (UMNO)

== Election results ==
Pahang state by-election, 7 December 2022 Upon the death of the candidate, Md Yunus Ramli
Party	Candidate	Votes	%	∆%
BN	Mohd Johari Hussain	8,080	48.95	▲4.92
PN	Nor Idayu Hashim	7,507	45.47	▲45.47
PH	Mohd Fadzli Mohd Ramly	784	4.75	▲4.75
PEJUANG	Osman Bakar	79	0.48	▲0.48
Independent	Sulaiman Bakar	58	0.35	▲0.35
Total valid votes		16,508	100.00	
Total rejected ballots		91		
Unreturned ballots		22		
Turnout		16,621	58.39	▼23.29
Registered electors		28,465		
Majority		573	3.48	▼4.98
BN hold		Swing		

Pahang state election, 2018
Party	Candidate	Votes	%	∆%
BN	Johari Hussain	6,662	44.03	▼20.57
PAS	Md Yunus Ramli	5,382	35.57	▲0.68
PKR	Ahmad Sazili Mohd Nor	3,029	20.02	▲20.02
Independent	Mohd Zolfakar Taib	58	0.38	▼0.13
Total valid votes		15,131	100.00	
Total rejected ballots		229		
Unreturned ballots		82		
Turnout		15,442	81.68	▼3.36
Registered electors		18,906		
Majority		1,280	8.46	▼21.25
BN hold		Swing		

Pahang state election, 2013
Party	Candidate	Votes	%	∆%
BN	Johari Hussain	8,883	64.60	▲1.70
PAS	Mohd Fadzli Mohd Ramly	4,797	34.88	▼2.22
Independent	Mohd Zolfakar Taib	71	0.52	▲0.52
Total valid votes		13,751	100.00	
Total rejected ballots		237		
Unreturned ballots		57		
Turnout		14,045	85.04	▲7.96
Registered electors		16,516		
Majority		4,086	29.71	▲3.92
BN hold		Swing		

Pahang state election, 2008
Party	Candidate	Votes	%	∆%
BN	Johari Hussain	6,375	62.89	▲6.27
PAS	Mohd Fadzli Mohd Ramly	3,761	37.11	▼6.27
Total valid votes		10,136	100.00	
Total rejected ballots		208		
Unreturned ballots		32		
Turnout		10,376	77.08	▲1.19
Registered electors		13,461		
Majority		2,614	25.79	▲12.54
BN hold		Swing		

Pahang state election, 2004
Party	Candidate	Votes	%	∆%
BN	Md. Rusli Ismail	5,301	56.62	▼1.62
PAS	Mohd Fadzli Mohd Ramly	4,061	43.38	▲1.62
Total valid votes		9,362	100.00	
Total rejected ballots		217		
Unreturned ballots		9		
Turnout		9,588	75.89	▲2.64
Registered electors		12,634		
Majority		1,240	13.25	▼3.23
BN hold		Swing		

Pahang state election, 1999
Party	Candidate	Votes	%	∆%
BN	Mustafar Abu Bakar	4,612	58.24	▼16.06
PAS	Mohd Fadzil Abdul Malek	3,307	41.76	▲16.06
Total valid votes		7,919	100.00	
Total rejected ballots		254		
Unreturned ballots		26		
Turnout		8,199	73.25	▼0.06
Registered electors		11,193		
Majority		1,305	16.48	▼32.12
BN hold		Swing		

Pahang state election, 1995
Party	Candidate	Votes	%	∆%
BN	Mustafar Abu Bakar	5,524	74.30	▼3.23
PAS	Muhamad Zahar Osman	1,911	25.70	▲25.70
Total valid votes		7,435	100.00	
Total rejected ballots		203		
Unreturned ballots		228		
Turnout		7,866	73.32	▲5.56
Registered electors		10,729		
Majority		3,613	48.59	▼6.47
BN hold		Swing		

Pahang state election, 1990
Party	Candidate	Votes	%	∆%
BN	Mustafar Abu Bakar	5,469	77.53	▼3.95
S46	Alias Sulaiman	1,585	22.47	▲22.47
Total valid votes		7,054	100.00	
Total rejected ballots		428		
Unreturned ballots		6		
Turnout		7,488	67.76	▲5.19
Registered electors		11,051		
Majority		3,884	55.06	▼7.90
BN hold		Swing		

Pahang state election, 1986
Party	Candidate	Votes	%
BN	Hasan Arifin	4,641	81.48
PAS	Abd. Rauof Abd. Majid	1,055	18.52
Total valid votes		5,696	100.00
Total rejected ballots		352	
Unreturned ballots		0	
Turnout		6,048	62.57
Registered electors		9,666	
Majority		3,586	62.96
This was a new constituency created.
