= Guai =

Political subdivision in Malaysia

Guai (N37)
Pahang constituency

State constituency
- Legislature: Pahang State Legislative Assembly
MLA
Sabariah Saidan
BN
- Constituency created: 1994
- First contested: 1995
- Last contested: 2022

Demographics
- Electors (2022): 24,412

Guai is a state constituency in Pahang, Malaysia, that has been represented in the Pahang State Legislative Assembly.

== Demographics ==
Ethnic breakdown of Guai's electorate as of 2022
1. Malay (86.1%)
2. Chinese (6.92%)
3. Other ethnicities (4.97%)
4. Indian (2.02%)

== History ==
=== Polling districts ===
According to the federal gazette issued on 31 October 2022, the Guai constituency is divided into 14 polling districts.

State constituency	Polling district	Code	Location
Guai（N37）	Charok Puting	090/37/01	SK Charuk Puting
Guai（N37）	Batu Bor	090/37/02	SK Batu Bor
Guai（N37）	Bohor Baharu	090/37/03	SK Bohor Baharu
Guai（N37）	FELDA Purun	090/37/04	SK LKTP Purun
Guai（N37）	FELDA Mayam	090/37/05	SK LKTP Mayam
Guai（N37）	FELDA Kumai	090/37/06	SK LKTP Kumai
Guai（N37）	FELDA Bukit Kepayang	090/37/07	SK LKTP Bukit Kepayang
Guai（N37）	Bukit Rok	090/37/08	SK Bukit Rok
Guai（N37）	Kuala Bera	090/38/09	SK Batu Papan
Guai（N37）	Kuala Triang	090/37/10	SK Kuala Triang
Guai（N37）	Senyum Jempol	090/37/11	SK Guai
Guai（N37）	Durian Tawar	090/37/12	SK Durian Tawar
Guai（N37）	Mengkarak	090/37/13	SJK (C) Mengkarak
Guai（N37）	Padang Luas	090/37/14	SMK Seri Bera

=== Representation history ===
Members of the Legislative Assembly for Guai
Assembly	No	Years	Name	Party
Constituency created from Bera and Teriang
9th	N34	1995-1999	Mohd Hayani Abd Rahman	BN (UMNO)
10th	N34	1999-2004	Abdul Aziz Yaakob	PAS
11th	N37	2004-2008	Hamzah Ibrahim	BN (UMNO)
12th	N37	2008-2013	Norol Azali Sulaiman	BN (UMNO)
13th	N37	2013-2018	Norol Azali Sulaiman	BN (UMNO)
14th	N37	2018-2022	Norol Azali Sulaiman	BN (UMNO)
15th	N37	2022–present	Sabariah Saidan	BN (UMNO)

== Election results ==
Pahang state election, 2022: Guai
Party	Candidate	Votes	%	∆%
BN	Sabariah Saidan	9,425	49.46	▼2.94
PN	Nor Hashimah Mat Noh	6,747	35.41	▲35.41
PH	Noraini Abdul Ghani	1,906	10.00	▲10.00
Independent	Jafari Mohd Yusof	977	5.13	▲5.13
Total valid votes		19,055	100.00	
Total rejected ballots		251		
Unreturned ballots		102		
Turnout		19,408	79.50	▼2.68
Registered electors		24,412		
Majority		2,678	14.05	▼7.14
BN hold		Swing		

Pahang state election, 2018: Guai
Party	Candidate	Votes	%	∆%
BN	Norolazali Sulaiman	8,147	52.41	▼6.01
PAS	Mohd Shahrul Mohamed	4,852	31.21	▼10.37
PKR	Ahmad Majdil Fauzi Abd Aziz	2,547	16.38	▲16.38
Total valid votes		15,546	100.00	
Total rejected ballots		269		
Unreturned ballots		89		
Turnout		15,904	82.18	▼2.90
Registered electors		19,353		
Majority		3,295	21.20	▲4.36
BN hold		Swing		

Pahang state election, 2013: Guai
Party	Candidate	Votes	%	∆%
BN	Norolazali Sulaiman	8,320	58.42	▲0.07
PAS	Musaniff Abdul Rahman	5,922	41.58	▼0.07
Total valid votes		14,242	100.00	
Total rejected ballots		184		
Unreturned ballots		67		
Turnout		14,493	85.08	▲5.76
Registered electors		17,034		
Majority		2,398	16.84	▲0.13
BN hold		Swing		

Pahang state election, 2008: Guai
Party	Candidate	Votes	%	∆%
BN	Norolazali Sulaiman	6,780	58.35	▲1.44
PAS	Musaniff Abdul Rahman	4,839	41.65	▼1.44
Total valid votes		11,619	100.00	
Total rejected ballots		185		
Unreturned ballots		0		
Turnout		11,804	79.32	▼0.43
Registered electors		14,881		
Majority		1,941	16.71	▲2.89
BN hold		Swing		

Pahang state election, 2004: Guai
Party	Candidate	Votes	%	∆%
BN	Hamzah Ibrahim	6,265	56.91	▲9.53
PAS	Abdul Aziz Yaakob	4,744	43.09	▼9.53
Total valid votes		11,009	100.00	
Total rejected ballots		180		
Unreturned ballots		15		
Turnout		11,204	79.75	▲2.58
Registered electors		14,049		
Majority		1,521	13.82	▲8.57
BN gain from PAS		Swing		-

Pahang state election, 1999: Guai
Party	Candidate	Votes	%	∆%
PAS	Abdul Aziz Yaakob	5,244	52.62	▲24.46
BN	Mustaffa Mat Yasin	4,721	47.38	▼24.46
Total valid votes		9,965	100.00	
Total rejected ballots		209		
Unreturned ballots		7		
Turnout		10,181	77.17	▲2.11
Registered electors		13,193		
Majority		523	5.25	▼38.43
PAS gain from BN		Swing		-

Pahang state election, 1995: Guai
Party	Candidate	Votes	%	∆%
BN	Mohd Hayani Abd Rahman	5,671	71.84	▲6.47
PAS	Idris Ngah	2,223	28.16	▼6.47
Total valid votes		7,894	100.00	
Total rejected ballots		256		
Unreturned ballots		27		
Turnout		8,177	75.06	▼3.60
Registered electors		10,894		
Majority		3,448	43.68	▲12.94
This was a new constituency created.
