= Muafakat Nasional =

- Abbreviation: MN
- President: Annuar Musa
- Founder: Annuar Musa
- Founded: 14 September 2019
- Dissolved: 15 December 2022
- Preceded by: Barisan Nasional (BN); Gagasan Sejahtera (GS)
- Headquarters: Pejabat Muafakat Nasional, Menara Dato’ Onn, Putra World Trade Centre, Jalan Tun Ismail, 50480, Kuala Lumpur
- Newspaper: Berita Harian; Harian Metro; New Straits Times; Harakah; Daily Express
- Student wing: Pergerakan Belia Muafakat Nasional
- Youth wing: Pergerakan Pemuda Muafakat Nasional
- Women's wing: Pergerakan Wanita Muafakat Nasional
- Membership: 85,000 (UMNO); 50,000 (PAS); 35,000 (BERSATU); 4,000 (SEDAR)
- Ideology: Ketuanan Melayu; National conservatism Islamic conservatism Islamism
- Political position: Right-wing to far-right
- Religion: Sunni Islam
- Colours: Green and Red
- Slogan: Muafakat Rakyat, Penyatuan Ummah ("National Concord, The Unification of the Ummah")

Muafakat Nasional (MN, English: National Concord) was a Malaysian political coalition that was formed between the Malaysian Islamic Party (PAS) and United Malays National Organisation (UMNO) against the then-ruling Pakatan Harapan (PH) coalition which had come into power after the 2018 Malaysian general election (GE14). The political cooperation between the two largest Malay/Muslim-based parties was officialised with the signing of the Piagam Muafakat Nasional (National Cooperation Charter). The five-point charter was signed by PAS president Abdul Hadi Awang and UMNO president Ahmad Zahid Hamidi in the Himpunan Penyatuan Ummah (Ummah Unity Rally) held at Putra World Trade Centre (PWTC), Kuala Lumpur on 14 September 2019. Its main aim is to unite the Malay/Muslim community or Ummah for electoral purposes.

== History ==
Despite calls for Muafakat Nasional to be institutionalised and become more inclusive towards Barisan Nasional (BN) and Gagasan Sejahtera (GS) where UMNO and PAS are major component parties respectively, there has been no formal agreement with the other parties in both coalitions to migrate to Muafakat Nasional. The new Muafakat Nasional coalition had planned to be formalised at its inaugural convention to be held by May 2020. A permanent secretariat of the pact was set up at UMNO's headquarters located at PWTC in May 2020.

Muafakat Nasional had extended an invitation to the Malaysian United Indigenous Party (BERSATU) led by its president and then-prime minister Muhyiddin Yassin to join the alliance in July 2020. On 15 August 2020, Muhyiddin reaffirmed that the party will join the alliance. However, BERSATU had also formed another coalition called Perikatan Nasional (PN) in the same period. On 3 April 2021, Wan Saiful Wan Jan the information chief of BERSATU revealed that the party had agreed to join the alliance but received no official response from either UMNO or PAS.

On 30 January 2022, ahead of the 2022 Johor state election, former prime minister Mohd Najib Abdul Razak disclosed that BERSATU was not included in the MN alliance as it had decided to contest against UMNO during the 2020 Sabah state election, in which BERSATU's newly formed PN coalition fielded candidates in all 17 seats.

On 15 December 2022, former Minister of Communication and Multimedia Tan Sri Annuar Musa declared that Muafakat Nasional was no longer a political coalition but a non-governmental organisation. He is also announced the list of the council members of the Muafakat Nasional (MN), including former Selangor UMNO chairman Noh Omar, former minister of home affairs Zuraida Kamaruddin, Federal Territory President of the Homeland Fighters' Party Khairuddin Abu Hassan, Chinese Muslim scholar Mohd Ridhuan Tee Abdullah, Chairman of the Joint Committee of MCA Kelantan Chua Hock Kuan, and former Minister in the Prime Minister's Department Mohd Redzuan Md Yusof.

== Organisational structure ==
- Chairman:
  - Annuar Musa
- Deputy Chairman:
  - Zuraida Kamaruddin
  - Mohd Redzuan Md Yusof
  - Edmund Santhara Kumar Ramanaidu
  - Noh Omar
  - Mohd Ridhuan Tee Abdullah
- Vice Chairman:
  - Shamsiah Yassin
  - Subash Chandrabose
  - Chua Hock Kuan
- Secretary General:
  - Shahrul Nizam Yunos
- Executive Secretary:
  - Mohd Irwan Rizal Ali Napiah
- Deputy Executive Secretary:
  - Musa Sabri Abd Sattar
  - Fariz Hadi
- Committee Members:
  - Tengku Idris Sultan Abu Bakar
  - Yahya Ibrahim
  - Shamrahayu Abd Aziz
  - Wan Azman Wan Abdullah
  - Khairuddin Abu Hassan
  - Sofian Ibrahim
  - Aziz Ibrahim
  - Zaini Mohamad
  - Farah Umirah Paruwis
  - Izzat Johari
  - Lila Ruzaini Hussain
  - Mohd Zuhdi Marzuki
  - Siti Faezah Abd Rahman
  - Ali Nor Ahlam
  - Eizlan Yusof
  - Jasper Supah
  - Junaidy Abd Wahab
  - Budiman Mohd. Zohdi
  - Zurihan Yusof
  - Tun Faisal Ismail Aziz
  - Mohamad Azam Ismail
  - Abd Muhaimin Abd Rahman Nazri
  - Nasir Ibrahim
  - Rafiei Mustapha
  - Wong Siew Mun
  - Mohd Anas Sudin
  - Julie Sabran
  - Musa Sabri Ab Sattar
  - Mohd Fariz Abd Hadi
  - Aris Shamsudin
  - Muhammad Muqharabbin Mokhtarrudin
  - Tengku Ainifarihin Tengku Abdullah
  - Nurul Hana Zainal Baharin
  - Yahya Ahmad
  - Iman Arif Saidul Bahari
  - Faridzul Azlan Abd Shani
- State Chairman:
  - Kedah: Mansor Mahamood
  - Kelantan: Wan Azman Wan Sulaiman
  - Malacca: Muhammad Jailani Khamis
  - Pahang: Nasrudin Hassan Tantawi
  - Perak: Nik Mohammad Azli Nik Ariffin
  - Selangor: Zuraida Kamaruddin
  - Negeri Sembilan: Badrul Hisham Shaharin
  - Sabah: Jasmit Japong
  - Sarawak: Justine Jinggot
