= List of International Islamic University Malaysia alumni =

International Islamic University Malaysia is a public university in Malaysia. The following is a list of notable alumni.

== A ==
- Adnan Yaakob, Menteri Besar of Pahang, Malaysia (1999–2018) and Pelangai MLA (1986–2022)
- Ahmad Fakhruddin Fakhrurazi, Kuala Kedah MP (since 2022)
- Ahmed Zahir Ali, Minister of Islamic Affairs, Maldives (2018–2023)
- Armizan Mohd Ali, Minister of Domestic Trade and Costs of Living, Malaysia (since 2023) and Papar MP (since 2022)
- Asyraf Wajdi Dusuki, MARA Chairman (since 2023), UMNO Youth Chief (2018–2023) and Deputy Minister in the Prime Minister's Department (Islamic Affairs), Malaysia (2015–2018)

== F ==
- Fadhlina Sidek, Minister of Education, Malaysia (since 2022) and Nibong Tebal MP (since 2022)
- Fong Po Kuan, Batu Gajah MP, Malaysia (1999–2013)

== H ==
- Halim Rane, Australian Muslim scholar
- Husnu Al Suood, Attorney General of the Maldives (2009–2010) and Justice of the Supreme Court of the Maldives (2019–2025)

== I ==
- Ibrahim Sani, CEO of Yayasan Peneraju Pendidikan Bumiputera and former News Anchor with Astro Awani
- Irmohizam Ibrahim, Board of Director Member, World Trade Centers Association (WTCA) (since 2020) and Kuala Selangor MP (2013–2018)
- Ismail Omar, 9th Inspector-General of Police, Malaysia (2010–2013)

== J ==
- Jafry Ariffin, Minister of Tourism, Culture and Environment of Sabah (2020–2023, since 2025) and Sukau MLA (since 2020)
- Jufitri Joha, Senator (since 2025)

== K ==
- Khairin Nisa Ismail, Member of the Johor State Executive Council and Serom MLA (since 2022)
- Khalid Abu Bakar, 10th Inspector-General of Police, Malaysia (2013–2017) and Chairman of Prasarana Malaysia (2017–2018)
- Muhammad Kamil Abdul Munim, Political Secretary to the Finance Minister of Malaysia (since 2023)
- Sano Koutoub Moustapha, Minister in the President's Office, Guinea

== M ==
- Marhamah Rosli, Deputy Minister in the Prime Minister's Department (Religious Affairs), Malaysia and Senator (since 2025)
- Mohamad Abdul Hamid, Deputy Chief Minister of Penang I, Malaysia (since 2023) and Batu Maung MLA (since 2023)
- Mohamad Alamin, Deputy Minister of Entrepreneur and Cooperatives Development (since 2025), Deputy Minister of Foreign Affairs (2022–2025), and Kimanis MP (since 2020)
- Mohamed Fadzli Hassan, Deputy Menteri Besar of Kelantan, Malaysia (since 2023) and Temangan MLA (since 2008)
- Mohamed Jameel Ahmed, Vice President of the Maldives (2013–2015)
- Mohamed Shaheem Ali Saeed, Minister of Islamic Affairs, Maldives (since 2023)
- Mohammad Tashim, Deputy Minister of Religious Affairs, Brunei (since 2022)
- Mohd Asri Zainul Abidin, Professor of Islamic studies, Universiti Sains Malaysia and Mufti of Perlis, Malaysia (2006–2008, since 2015)
- Mohd Khalid Ismail, 15th Inspector-General of Police, Malaysia (since 2025)
- Mohd Na'im Mokhtar, Minister in the Prime Minister's Department (Religious Affairs), Malaysia (2022–2025) and Senator (since 2022), 4th Chief Judge of the Syariah Court (2019–2022)
- Mohamed Hanipa Maidin, Deputy Minister in the Prime Minister's Department (Legal Affairs), Malaysia (2018–2020) and Sepang MP (2013–2022)
- Muhammad Faiz Fadzil, LKIM Chairman (since 2023) and Permatang Pasir MLA (2018–2023)
- Muhammad Ibrahim, 8th Governor of the Central Bank of Malaysia (2016–2018)
- Mumtaz Md Nawi, Tumpat MP (since 2022), Member of the Kelantan State Executive Council and Demit MLA (2013–2023)
- Mohd Shuhaily Mohd Zain, Director-General of the Malaysian Checkpoints and Borders Agency (Since 2025)

== N ==
- Norarfan Zainal, Rector of Sultan Sharif Ali Islamic University since 2014
- Norhasmimi Abdul Ghani, Senator (since 2025)
- Nuridah Mohd Salleh, Senator (2018–2022)

== O ==
- Omar Suleiman, American Muslim scholar

== R ==
- Reezal Merican Naina Merican, MP for Kepala Batas (since 2013) and Deputy Minister of Foreign Affairs (2013–2018)
- Reezal Merican Naina Merican, 9th MATRADE Chairman (since 2023), Bertam MLA (since 2023), Minister of Housing and Local Government (2021–2022) and Kepala Batas MP (2013–2022)
- Rosnah Shirlin, Deputy Minister of Works (2013–2018) and Papar MP (2004–2018)

== S ==
- Shamsul Iskandar Md Akin, Senior Political Secretary to the Prime Minister of Malaysia (2022–2025), Deputy Minister of Primary Industries (2018–2020) and Hang Tuah Jaya MP (2018–2022)
- Syed Saddiq Syed Abdul Rahman, Minister of Youth and Sports (2018–2020) and Muar MP (since 2018)

== T ==
- Tengku Amalin A'ishah Putri, Princess of Kelantan and member of the House of Bolkiah by marriage

== W ==
- Wan Badariah Wan Saad, Member of the Perlis State Executive Council and Mata Ayer MLA (2022–2025)
- Wong Kah Woh, Deputy Minister of Education, Malaysia (since 2023), Taiping MP (since 2022) and Ipoh Timor MP (2018–2022)

== Y ==
- Yasir Nadeem al Wajidi, Chicago-based Islamic scholar and founder of Darul Uloom Online

== Z ==
- Zambry Abdul Kadir, Minister of Higher Education, Malaysia (since 2023), Senator (since 2022), Menteri Besar of Perak (2009–2018), and Pangkor MLA (2004–2022)
- Zulkifli Hasan, Minister in the Prime Minister's Department (Religious Affairs), Malaysia (since 2025) and Senator (since 2023)
