= 2024–25 Malaysia A3 Community League =

Malaysia A3 Community League
- Season: 2024–25
- Champions: Sg. Putat FC; MBMB Warriors; PUSEN KSRNS; AZM Rovers; Jebeng; Bintong F.C. Raub F.C. Baarz F.C. FR One Four F.C. MOF-Sungai Merab F.C.
- Matches: 152

The 2024–25 Malaysia A3 Community League (Malay: ms:Liga Komuniti A3 Malaysia 2024-25) was the third season of the Malaysia A3 Community League, the 4th to 9th tier football leagues in the Malaysian football league system.

== Teams changes ==
The following teams have changed division since the 2023 season.

▲ Promoted to 2024–25 Malaysia A2 Amateur League	▼ Relegated from 2023 Malaysia M4 League	Withdrawn teams
(Perlis) Guar Syed Alwi; (Perak) Pencinta Setia; (Kuala Lumpur) Kampong Ku; (Selangor) NBK Empire; (Selangor) Gombak City; (Putrajaya) SJ Virtuosos; (Negeri Sembilan) Real Mambau; (Negeri Sembilan) Bunga Raya II; (Pahang) Semantan Troopers	(Pahang) Kuantan City; (Negeri Sembilan) NS Cyberfox; (Terengganu) Real Chukai; (Selangor) Republic of Borneo; (Sarawak) Susun Tenaga Resources; (Sarawak) Mukah Youth Team; (Sarawak) Maqarize	(Terengganu) Real Chukai; (Selangor) Republic of Borneo; (Sarawak) Susun Tenaga Resources; (Sarawak) Mukah Youth Team; (Sarawak) Maqarize

Notes

1. Gombak City (SEL): changed name to Selayang City.
2. Bunga Raya II (BUN): changed name to Bunga Raya United.

== Teams ==
The table below shows the number of teams participating in the 3 zonal leagues and the number of slots allocated to each league for the 2025–26 Malaysia A2 Amateur League.

South Zone
State/Community leagues	PT	PS	Winner	Promoted
(Malacca) Melaka A3 Community Super League (Series 1)	9	1	Sungai Putat F.C.	None
(Malacca) Melaka A3 Community League (Division 1)	10	2	MBMB Warriors	MBMB Warriors Duyong Fighters
Negeri Sembilan A3 Community Super League	10	1	Ayrish F.C.	24 Warrior
(Negeri Sembilan) Seremban Football A3 Community League	10	2	PUSEN KSRNS	PUSEN KSRNS Teck Hin
(Negeri Sembilan) SFL–UiTM NS A3 Community League	10	1	UiTM NS F.C.	None
FA Johor	Not held			

North & East Coast Zone
State/Community leagues	PT	PS	Winner	Promoted
Perlis Super League	8	2	Bintong F.C.	Bintong F.C. Kuala Perlis Titans F.C.
PUC A3 Kelantan Champions League	18	1	Jebeng F.C.	AZM Rovers F.C.
Pahang Amateur League	14	2	Raub F.C.	Raub Kuantan City
FA Penang	Not held			
FA Kedah	Not held			
FA Perak	did not participate			
FA Terengganu	Not held			

Central Zone
State/Community leagues	PT	PS	Winner	Promoted
(Selangor) A Ligue Champions League	30	1	Baarz F.C.	None
(Selangor) MAHSA A3 Community League	9	1	FR One Four F.C.	None
Putrajaya A3 Community League	10	1	MOF-Sungai Merab FC	MOF-Sungai Merab FC
FA Kuala Lumpur	did not participate			

Borneo Zone
FA Sarawak	did not participate
FA Sabah	did not participate

Notes:

- PT (participating teams): Total number of teams participating in each league
- PS (promotion slots): Number of slots allocated to each league for the A2 Amateur League

== South Zone ==
=== Group stage ===
Pos	Team	Pld	W	D	L	GF	GA	GD	Pts	Promotion, qualification or relegation
1	SBC FC	8	7	1	0	37	5	+32	22	Advance to the knockout round
2	Sungai Putat F.C. (C)	8	6	1	1	30	6	+24	19	Advance to the knockout round
3	Serkam United FC	8	5	2	1	28	4	+24	17	Advance to the knockout round
4	Desa Baru FC	8	5	2	1	26	8	+18	17	Advance to the knockout round
5	Melaka Cops FC	8	3	1	4	12	15	−3	10	
6	Scofa FC	8	2	2	4	7	9	−2	8	
7	Settlers FC	8	1	1	6	5	28	−23	4	
8	Danke FC	8	1	1	6	8	35	−27	4	
9	Dynamo FC	8	0	1	7	3	46	−43	1	

Updated to match(es) played on 13 July 2024. Source: Super Football League
Rules for classification: 1) Points; 2) Goal difference; 3) Number of goals scored.
(C) Champions

=== Fixtures and results ===
Match

=== Matchweek 1 ===
4 May 2024	Scofa FC	3−1	Danke FC	Durian Tunggal
21:00 UTC+8		Report		Stadium: University Teknikal Malaysia Melaka

11 May 2024	Desa Baru FC	2−2	Serkam United	Alor Gajah
15:30 UTC+8	Elegeswaran 18'; Muhammad Farhan 73'	Report	Ahmad Faimy Yahya 43'; Shamerul Abdul Aziz 44'	Stadium: UiTM Lendu Football Field

11 May 2024	Dynamo FC	1−10	SBC FC	Alor Gajah
17:30 UTC+8	Muhammad Nabil 39'	Report	Amierul Ismail 9', 56'; Syafiq Abd. Samad 7', 20', 31'; Nurul Naim 37', 38'; Ibrahim Mahamat 57'; Solehhi 58'; Muhammad Nurul 79'	Stadium: UiTM Lendu Football Field

12 May 2024	Sg. Putat FC	4−1	Melaka Cops FC	Alor Gajah
17:30 UTC+8	Azmil Azran 3', 80'; Aqil Hazwan 7'; P.Loga 39'	Report	Arif Fadilah 3', 18'	Stadium: UiTM Lendu Football Field

=== Matchweek 2 ===
18 May 2024	Danke FC	4−1	Dynamo FC	Alor Gajah
15:30 UTC+8	Daxter Ronald 19'; Syafie Shukor 30'; Norshariq 50'; Puvan Raj 54'	Report	Aiman Hafizi 40'	Stadium: UiTM Lendu Football Field

18 May 2024	Settlers FC	0−7	SBC FC	Alor Gajah
17:00 UTC+8		Report	Mohd Akmal 11'; Zulkarnain Solong 22'; Syafiq Abd Samad 41'; Muhaimin Osman 62'; Nurul Naim 69'; Syafiq Abd Samad 73'	Stadium: UiTM Lendu Football Field

19 May 2024	Sg. Putat FC	2−2	Desa Baru FC	Alor Gajah
15:30 UTC+8	Azmil Azran 21'; P. Logaa 49'	Report	Mohammad Rais 37', 61'	Stadium: UiTM Lendu Football Field

19 May 2024	SCOFA	1−2	Serkam United	Alor Gajah
17:00 UTC+8	Muhammad Azeem 40+2'	Report	Aiman Abdullah 18'; Agku Mohd Hamirullizam 72'	Stadium: UiTM Lendu Football Field

=== Matchweek 3 ===
25 May 2024	Settlers FC	0−2	Melaka Cops FC	Alor Gajah
15:30 UTC+8		Report	Nazrin Mohd Nasir 32'; Arif Fadilah Omar 64'	Stadium: UiTM Lendu Football Field

25 May 2024	Dynamo FC	0−11	Serkam United	Alor Gajah
17:00 UTC+8		Report		Stadium: UiTM Lendu Football Field

26 May 2024	SBC FC	7−0	Danke FC	Alor Gajah
15:30 UTC+8	Zulkarnain Solong 11', 37'; Sollehi Ahmad Zuhaimi 17'; Ariff Zaini 28'; Arshad Mohd Rashid 67', 73', 80+1'	Report		Stadium: UiTM Lendu Football Field

26 May 2024	SCOFA	0−1	Sg. Putat FC	Alor Gajah
17:00 UTC+8		Report	Najmi Rosli 59'	Stadium: UiTM Lendu Football Field

=== Matchweek 4 ===
1 June 2024	Melaka Cops FC	1−5	SBC FC	Alor Gajah
15:15 UTC+8	Zulfiza Abas 16'	Report	Akmal Norjam 24'; Mohd Sollehi 50', 64', 80+3'; Arshad Rashid 78'	Stadium: UiTM Lendu Football Field

1 June 2024	Sg. Putat FC	10−0	Dynamo FC	Alor Gajah
17:15 UTC+8	Zulfadhli 28'; Imran 32'; Azmil 38', 64'; Aqil 51'; Najmi 53', 60', 70', 78'; Muhd Nabila 80'	Report		Stadium: UiTM Lendu Football Field

2 June 2024	Desa Baru FC	8−0	Settlers FC	Alor Gajah
15:15 UTC+8	Ahmed Faries 11'; Amirul Syakirin 31'; Norsyazmer 34', 48', 55'; Muhammad Fikri 39', 42'; Fazwan 53'	Report		Stadium: UiTM Lendu Football Field

2 June 2024	Serkam United FC	7−0	Danke FC	Alor Gajah
17:15 UTC+8	Shamerul 16'; Norisam 41', 44'; Ag Ku 70'; Ijaz 71', 72'; Azrul 79'	Report		Stadium: UiTM Lendu Football Field

=== Matchweek 5 ===
8 June 2024	SBC FC	0−0	Serkam United FC	Alor Gajah
15:15 UTC+8		Report		Stadium: UiTM Lendu Football Field

8 June 2024	Danke FC	1−9	Sg. Putat FC	Alor Gajah
17:15 UTC+8		Report		Stadium: UiTM Lendu Football Field

9 June 2024	Settlers FC	1−2	Scofa FC	Alor Gajah
15:15 UTC+8		Report		Stadium: UiTM Lendu Football Field

9 June 2024	Melaka Cops FC	1−3	Desa Baru FC	Alor Gajah
17:15 UTC+8		Report		Stadium: UiTM Lendu Football Field

=== Matchweek 6 ===
22 June 2024	Serkam United FC	0−1	Sg. Putat FC	Alor Gajah
15:15 UTC+8		Report	Jeevan Nair 80+1'	Stadium: UiTM Lendu Football Field

22 June 2024	Desa Baru FC	2−3	SBC FC	Alor Gajah
17:15 UTC+8	Ammar Rahim 5'; Nur Alif 49'	Report	Zamree 18'; Sollehi 31'; Hanafi 40+1'	Stadium: UiTM Lendu Football Field

23 June 2024	Settlers FC	2−1	Dynamo FC	Alor Gajah
15:15 UTC+8	Ridzuan 7'; Zaquan 13'	Report	Amirul 23'	Stadium: UiTM Lendu Football Field

23 June 2024	Melaka Cops FC	0−0	SCOFA	Alor Gajah
17:15 UTC+8		Report		Stadium: UiTM Lendu Football Field

=== Matchweek 7 ===
29 June 2024	SBC FC	2−0	Sg. Putat FC	Alor Gajah
15:15 UTC+8		Report		Stadium: UiTM Lendu Football Field

29 June 2024	Dynamo FC	0−4	Melaka Cops FC	Alor Gajah
17:15 UTC+8		Report		Stadium: UiTM Lendu Football Field

30 June 2024	Danke FC	2−2	Settlers FC	Alor Gajah
15:15 UTC+8	Hairil 30'; ? 34'	Report	Danish Aiman 1'; Faiq Naili 72'	Stadium: UiTM Lendu Football Field

30 June 2024	SCOFA	0−1	Desa Baru FC	Alor Gajah
17:15 UTC+8		Report	Ahmad Faries 9'	Stadium: UiTM Lendu Football Field

=== Matchweek 8 ===
6 July 2024	Settlers FC	0−3	Serkam United	Alor Gajah
15:15 UTC+8		Report		Stadium: UiTM Lendu Football Field

6 July 2024	Melaka Cops	3−0	Danke FC	Alor Gajah
17:15 UTC+8				Stadium: UiTM Lendu Football Field

7 July 2024	Desa Baru FC	5−0	Dynamo FC	Alor Gajah
15:15 UTC+8		Report		Stadium: UiTM Lendu Football Field

7 July 2024	SBC FC	3−1	SCOFA	Alor Gajah
17:15 UTC+8		Report		Stadium: UiTM Lendu Football Field

=== Matchweek 9 ===
13 July 2024	Danke FC	0−3	Desa Baru FC	Alor Gajah
15:15 UTC+8		Report		Stadium: UiTM Lendu Football Field

13 July 2024	Sg. Putat FC	3−0	Settlers FC	Alor Gajah
17:15 UTC+8		Report		Stadium: UiTM Lendu Football Field

13 July 2024	Serkam United	3−0	Melaka Cops	Alor Gajah
15:15 UTC+8		Report		Stadium: UiTM Lendu Football Field

13 July 2024	Dynamo FC	0−0	SCOFA	Alor Gajah
17:15 UTC+8		Report		Stadium: UiTM Lendu Football Field

=== Knockout stage ===
Semifinals
1	SBC FC	3
4	Desa Baru FC	0
2	Sg. Putat FC	1
3	Serkam United	0

Final
SBC FC	0
Sg. Putat FC	2

=== Semi-finals ===
28 July 2024	SBC FC	3−0	Desa Baru FC	Alor Gajah
08:30 UTC+8		Report		Stadium: UiTM Lendu Football Field

28 July 2024	Sg. Putat FC	1−0	Serkam United FC	Alor Gajah
15:15 UTC+8		Report		Stadium: UiTM Lendu Football Field

=== Final ===
11 August 2024	SBC FC	0−2	Sg. Putat FC	Krubong
16:45 UTC+8		Report	Azmil Azran Abd Rahman; Mohd Imran Samso	Stadium: Hang Jebat Stadium

=== Melaka A3 Community League (Division 1) ===
Pos	Team	Pld	W	D	L	GF	GA	GD	Pts	Promotion, qualification or relegation
1	MBMB Warriors F.C. (C)	9	8	1	0	38	5	+33	25	Promotion to A2 Amateur League
2	Hulubalang	9	6	2	1	16	6	+10	20	
3	Perma	9	6	0	3	17	13	+4	18	
4	Andalas	9	6	0	3	16	13	+3	18	
5	Duyong Fighters F.C.	9	5	2	2	19	13	+6	17	Promotion to A2 Amateur League
6	PSP FC	9	4	1	4	16	16	0	13	
7	Bertam Ulu	9	4	0	5	12	13	−1	12	
8	Teman FM	9	2	0	7	11	20	−9	6	
9	Tedong	9	1	0	8	8	33	−25	3	Relegation to Melaka League (Division 2)
10	Panglima	9	0	0	9	9	30	−21	0	Relegation to Melaka League (Division 2)

Updated to match(es) played on 3 September 2024. Source: Melaka Football Association
Rules for classification: 1) Points; 2) Goal difference; 3) Number of goals scored.
(C) Champions

=== Negeri Sembilan A3 Community Super League ===
Pos	Team	Pld	W	D	L	GF	GA	GD	Pts	Promotion, qualification or relegation
1	Ayrish (C)	9	8	0	1	42	8	+34	24	Advance to the knockout round
2	24 Warrior	9	6	1	2	22	15	+7	19	Advance to the knockout round & promotion to A2 Amateur League
3	Lukut Brothers	9	6	0	3	25	13	+12	18	Advance to the knockout round
4	XV Blitz	9	5	2	2	30	14	+16	17	Advance to the knockout round
5	FC Mont 05	9	5	2	2	27	14	+13	17	
6	Real Mambau II	9	4	1	4	24	21	+3	13	
7	UiTM Seremban 3	9	3	1	5	18	32	−14	10	
8	IPGMKRM FC	9	2	2	5	15	28	−13	8	
9	Kelab Yayasan N.Sembilan	9	1	1	7	13	32	−19	4	
10	Perantau United	9	0	0	9	4	43	−39	0	

Updated to match(es) played on 14 October 2024. Source: Super Football League
Rules for classification: 1) Points; 2) Goal difference; 3) Number of goals scored.
(C) Champions

=== Fixtures and results ===
Match

=== Matchweek 1 ===
23 June 2024	24 Warrior FC	1−1	XV Blitz	Bandar Sri Sendayan
21:00 UTC+8		Report		Stadium: Padang Arena IRC

29 June 2024	IPGMKRM FC	0−7	Ayrish FC	Sikamat
16:45 UTC+8		Report		Stadium: Padang B IPG Kampus Raja Melewar

30 June 2024	Perantau United FC	1−5	Real Mambau II	Sikamat
16:45 UTC+8		Report		Stadium: Padang B IPG Kampus Raja Melewar

=== Matchweek 2 ===
6 July 2024	24 Warrior FC	4−1	IPGMKRM FC	Seremban
16:45 UTC+8		Report		Stadium: Padang UiTM Kampus Seremban 3

7 July 2024	XV Blitz	6−1	Lukut Brothers FC	Seremban
15:15 UTC+8		Report		Stadium: Padang UiTM Kampus Seremban 3

7 July 2024	FC Mont 05	5−0	UiTM Seremban 3	Seremban
17:15 UTC+8		Report		Stadium: Padang UiTM Kampus Seremban 3

7 July 2024	Real Mambau II	1−0	Kelab Yayasan N.Sembilan	Sikamat
16:45 UTC+8		Report		Stadium: Padang B IPG Kampus Raja Melewar

=== Matchweek 3 ===
13 July 2024	Kelab Yayasan N.Sembilan	6−1	Perantau United	Seremban
15:15 UTC+8		Report		Stadium: Padang UiTM Kampus Seremban 3

13 July 2024	Real Mambau II	1−2	Ayrish FC	Seremban
17:15 UTC+8		Report		Stadium: Padang UiTM Kampus Seremban 3

14 July 2024	Lukut Brothers	1−2	FC Mont 05	Seremban
15:15 UTC+8		Report		Stadium: Padang UiTM Kampus Seremban 3

14 July 2024	UiTM Seremban 3	4−2	IPGMKRM FC	Seremban
17:15 UTC+8		Report		Stadium: Padang UiTM Kampus Seremban 3

=== Matchweek 4 ===
20 July 2024	Perantau United	1−7	UiTM Seremban 3	Seremban
15:15 UTC+8		Report		Stadium: Padang UiTM Kampus Seremban 3

20 July 2024	Ayrish	5−1	FC Mont	Seremban
17:15 UTC+8		Report		Stadium: Padang UiTM Kampus Seremban 3

21 July 2024	IPGMKRM FC	1−1	Real Mambau II	Seremban
15:15 UTC+8		Report		Stadium: Padang UiTM Kampus Seremban 3

21 July 2024	Kelab Yayasan N.Sembilan	1−6	Lukut Brothers	Seremban
17:15 UTC+8		Report		Stadium: Padang UiTM Kampus Seremban 3

=== Matchweek 5 ===
27 July 2024	FC Mont	0−0	Kelab Yayasan N.Sembilan	Sikamat
16:45 UTC+8		Report		Stadium: Padang B IPG Kampus Raja Melewar

28 July 2024	Lukut Brothers	2−1	Ayrish	Seremban
15:15 UTC+8				Stadium: Padang UiTM Kampus Seremban 3

28 July 2024	UiTM Seremban 3	1−1	XV Blitz	Seremban
15:15 UTC+8				Stadium: Padang UiTM Kampus Seremban 3

28 July 2024	24 Warrior	3−0	Perantau United	Seremban
15:15 UTC+8				Stadium: Padang UiTM Kampus Seremban 3

=== Matchweek 6 ===
3 August 2024	Ayrish	19−1	Perantau United	Seremban
15:15 UTC+8		Report		Stadium: Padang UiTM Kampus Seremban 3

3 August 2024	Real Mambau II	3−2	XV Blitz	Seremban
17:15 UTC+8		Report		Stadium: Padang UiTM Kampus Seremban 3

4 August 2024	IPGMKRM FC	0−4	Lukut Brothers	Seremban
15:15 UTC+8		Report		Stadium: Padang UiTM Kampus Seremban 3

4 August 2024	UiTM Seremban 3	3−1	Kelab Yayasan N.Sembilan	Seremban
17:15 UTC+8		Report		Stadium: Padang UiTM Kampus Seremban 3

=== Matchweek 7 ===
17 August 2024	24 Warrior	4−2	UiTM Seremban 3	Seremban
17:15 UTC+8		Report		Stadium: Padang UiTM Kampus Seremban 3

18 August 2024	Perantau United	0−3	Lukut Brothers	Seremban
15:15 UTC+8		Report		Stadium: Padang UiTM Kampus Seremban 3

18 August 2024	FC Mont	8−1	Real Mambau II	Seremban
17:15 UTC+8		Report		Stadium: Padang UiTM Kampus Seremban 3

=== Matchweek 8 ===
25 August 2024	IPGMKRM FC	2−0	Perantau United	Sikamat
15:15 UTC+8		Report		Stadium: Padang B IPG Kampus Raja Melewar

25 August 2024	FC Mont	4−1	24 Warrior	Sikamat
17:15 UTC+8		Report		Stadium: Padang B IPG Kampus Raja Melewar

=== Matchweek 9 ===
7 September 2024	XV Blitz	4−3	IPGMKRM FC	Sikamat
15:15 UTC+8		Report		Stadium: Padang B IPG Kampus Raja Melewar

7 September 2024	FC Mont 05	3−0	Perantau United	Sikamat
17:15 UTC+8		Report		Stadium: Padang B IPG Kampus Raja Melewar

8 September 2024	Kelab Yayasan N.Sembilan	2−6	Ayrish	Sikamat
15:15 UTC+8		Report		Stadium: Padang B IPG Kampus Raja Melewar

8 September 2024	Lukut Brothers	1−2	24 Warrior	Sikamat
17:15 UTC+8		Report		Stadium: Padang B IPG Kampus Raja Melewar

=== Matchweek 10 ===
15 September 2024	24 Warriors	0−5	Ayrish	Sikamat
15:15 UTC+8		Report		Stadium: Padang B IPG Kampus Raja Melewar

15 September 2024	Kelab Yayasan N.Sembilan	1−8	XV Blitz	Sikamat
17:15 UTC+8		Report		Stadium: Padang B IPG Kampus Raja Melewar

=== Matchweek 11 ===
21 September 2024	XV Blitz	4−2	FC Mont 05	Sikamat
17:15 UTC+8		Report		Stadium: Padang B IPG Kampus Raja Melewar

22 September 2024	UiTM Seremban 3	1−4	Lukut Brothers	Sikamat
15:15 UTC+8		Report		Stadium: Padang B IPG Kampus Raja Melewar

22 September 2024	XV Blitz	1−2	Ayrish	Sikamat
17:15 UTC+8		Report		Stadium: Padang B IPG Kampus Raja Melewar

=== Matchweek 12 ===
28 September 2024	FC Mont 05	2−2	IPGMKRM FC	Sikamat
16:45 UTC+8		Report		Stadium: Padang B IPG Kampus Raja Melewar

29 September 2024	Kelab Yayasan N.Sembilan	0−3	24 Warriors	Sikamat
15:15 UTC+8		Report		Stadium: Padang B IPG Kampus Raja Melewar

29 September 2024	Real Mambau II	11−0	UiTM Seremban 3	Sikamat
17:15 UTC+8		Report		Stadium: Padang B IPG Kampus Raja Melewar

=== Matchweek 13 ===
5 October 2024	Real Mambau II	1−4	24 Warriors	Sikamat
15:15 UTC+8		Report		Stadium: Padang B IPG Kampus Raja Melewar

5 October 2024	Kelab Yayasan N.Sembilan	2−4	IPGMKRM FC	Sikamat
17:15 UTC+8		Report		Stadium: Padang B IPG Kampus Raja Melewar

13 October 2024	Ayrish	3−0	UiTM Seremban	Sikamat
15:15 UTC+8		Report		Stadium: Padang B IPG Kampus Raja Melewar

13 October 2024	Lukut Brothers	3−0	Real Mambau II	Sikamat
17:15 UTC+8		Report		Stadium: Padang B IPG Kampus Raja Melewar

==== NS A3 Community Super League Knock-out stage ====
Semifinals
1	Ayrish	3	2	5
4	XV Blitz	1	2	3
2	24 Warriors	2	2	4
3	Lukut Brothers	1	2	3

Final
Ayrish	2
24 Warriors	0

===== Semi-finals =====
====== First leg ======
23 November 2024	Lukut Brothers	1−2	24 Warriors	Seremban
16:45 UTC+8	Thiyagu 46'	Report	Iqbal Zainol 2'; Aidil Firdaus 28'	Stadium: Rahang Synthetic pitch

24 November 2024	XV Blitz	1−3	Ayrish	Port Dickson
16:45 UTC+8	Sabri Zahari 54'	Report	Ibrahim Suhaib 54'; Luqman Hakim 47'; Kuganeishvaran 62'	Stadium: Merdeka Football pitch

====== Second leg ======
7 December 2024	Ayrish	2−2	XV Blitz	Kuala Pilah
16:45 UTC+8	Kuganeishvaran 26'; Luqman Hakim 32'	Report	Nik Irwan 62'; Asyraaf 90+2'	Stadium: Kuala Pilah Mini Stadium

22 December 2024	24 Warriors	2−2	Lukut Brothers	Kuala Pilah
17:00 UTC+8	Taufik Shamsudin 79'; Amirul Hakim 90'	Report	Khaalithasan 48'; S. Kannan 73'	Stadium: Kuala Pilah Mini Stadium

===== Final =====
28 December 2024	Ayrish	2−0	24 Warriors	Kuala Pilah
16:15 UTC+8	Ku Mohd Nazran 8'; Ibrahim Suhaib 34'	Report		Stadium: Kuala Pilah Mini Stadium

=== Seremban Football A3 Community League ===
==== Group stage ====
Pos	Team	Pld	W	D	L	GF	GA	GD	Pts	Promotion, qualification or relegation
1	PUSEN KSRNS (C, P)	9	7	1	1	23	7	+16	22	Advance to the knockout round & Promotion to A2 Amateur League
2	Rig FC	9	6	2	1	34	6	+28	20	Advance to the knockout round
3	Teck Hin F.C.	9	6	1	2	22	8	+14	19	Advance to the knockout round & Promotion to A2 Amateur League
4	PD United	9	6	1	2	18	5	+13	19	Advance to the knockout round
5	Mixstars FC	9	5	2	2	16	12	+4	17	
6	Bahau Leggha	9	4	1	4	16	15	+1	13	
7	Desa Rhu FC	9	2	2	5	11	16	−5	8	
8	Herby Crashers FC	9	2	0	7	11	31	−20	6	
9	RJ United	9	2	0	7	6	30	−24	6	
10	NS Cyberfox	9	0	0	9	1	28	−27	0	

Updated to match(es) played on 11 August 2024. Source: Seremban Football League
Rules for classification: 1) Points; 2) Goal difference; 3) Number of goals scored.
(C) Champions; (P) Promoted

==== Fixtures and results ====
Match

===== Matchweek 1 =====
1 June 2024	Desa Rhu	0−2	PUSEN KSRNS	Bandar Sri Sendayan
15:00 UTC+8				Stadium: PUSEN City Football Field 'A'

1 June 2024	Mixstars	4−1	NS Cyberfox	Bandar Sri Sendayan
17:00 UTC+8				Stadium: PUSEN City Football Field 'A'

2 June 2024	Rig FC	1−2	Teck Hin	Bandar Sri Sendayan
15:00 UTC+8				Stadium: PUSEN City Football Field 'A'

2 June 2024	Bahau Leggha	1−2	PD United	Bandar Sri Sendayan
16:00 UTC+8				Stadium: PUSEN City Football Field 'B'

15 June 2024	Herby Crashers	0−1	RJ United	Bandar Sri Sendayan
17:00 UTC+8		Report		Stadium: PUSEN City Football Field 'A'

===== Matchweek 2 =====
8 June 2024	PD United	4−0	Herby Crashers	Bandar Sri Sendayan
15:00 UTC+8		Report		Stadium: PUSEN City Football Field 'A'

8 June 2024	Teck Hin	0−0	Mixstars	Bandar Sri Sendayan
17:00 UTC+8		Report		Stadium: PUSEN City Football Field 'A'

9 June 2024	PUSEN KSRNS	1−1	Rig FC	Bandar Sri Sendayan
15:00 UTC+8		Report		Stadium: PUSEN City Football Field 'A'

9 June 2024	Desa Rhu	0−0	Bahau Leggha	Bandar Sri Sendayan
17:00 UTC+8		Report		Stadium: PUSEN City Football Field 'A'

9 June 2024	RJ United	3−0	NS Cyberfox	Bandar Sri Sendayan
17:00 UTC+8		Report		Stadium: PUSEN City Football Field 'A'

===== Matchweek 3 =====
22 June 2024	PUSEN KSRNS	5−0	Herby Crashers	Bandar Sri Sendayan
15:15 UTC+8		Report		Stadium: PUSEN City Football Field 'A'

22 June 2024	Desa Rhu	0−2	Rig FC	Bandar Sri Sendayan
17:15 UTC+8		Report		Stadium: PUSEN City Football Field 'A'

23 June 2024	RJ United	0−5	Tech Hin FC	Bandar Sri Sendayan
15:15 UTC+8				Stadium: PUSEN City Football Field 'A'

23 June 2024	Mixstars	1−0	PD United	Bandar Sri Sendayan
17:15 UTC+8				Stadium: PUSEN City Football Field 'A'

2024	Bahau Leggha	3−0	NS Cyberfox	Bandar Sri Sendayan
--:-- UTC+8				Stadium: PUSEN City Football Field 'A'

===== Matchweek 4 =====
6 July 2024	RJ United	1−9	Rig FC	Bandar Sri Sendayan
15:15 UTC+8		Report		Stadium: PUSEN City Football Field 'A'

6 July 2024	Teck Hin FC	2−3	Bahau Leggha	Bandar Sri Sendayan
17:15 UTC+8		Report		Stadium: PUSEN City Football Field 'A'

7 July 2024	Herby Crashers	1−2	Mixstars	Bandar Sri Sendayan
15:15 UTC+8		Report		Stadium: PUSEN City Football Field 'A'

7 July 2024	PD United	3−0	Desa Rhu	Bandar Sri Sendayan
17:15 UTC+8		Report		Stadium: PUSEN City Football Field 'A'

7 July 2024	PUSEN KSRNS	3−0	NS Cyberfox	Bandar Sri Sendayan
17:15 UTC+8				Stadium: PUSEN City Football Field 'A'

===== Matchweek 5 =====
13 July 2024	Desa Rhu	4−1	RJ United	Bandar Sri Sendayan
15:15 UTC+8		Report		Stadium: PUSEN City Football Field 'A'

13 July 2024	Mixstars	2−1	Bahau Leggha	Bandar Sri Sendayan
17:15 UTC+8		Report		Stadium: PUSEN City Football Field 'A'

14 July 2024	Teck Hin	1−2	PUSEN KSRNS	Bandar Sri Sendayan
15:15 UTC+8		Report		Stadium: PUSEN City Football Field 'A'

14 July 2024	Rig FC	9−0	Herby Crashers	Bandar Sri Sendayan
17:15 UTC+8		Report		Stadium: PUSEN City Football Field 'A'

14 July 2024	PD United	3−0	NS Cyberfox	Bandar Sri Sendayan
17:15 UTC+8				Stadium: PUSEN City Football Field 'A'

===== Matchweek 6 =====
20 July 2024	RJ United	0−3	Bahau Leggha	Bandar Sri Sendayan
15:15 UTC+8		Report		Stadium: PUSEN City Football Field 'A'

20 July 2024	PD United	2−1	PUSEN KSRNS	Bandar Sri Sendayan
17:15 UTC+8		Report		Stadium: PUSEN City Football Field 'A'

21 July 2024	Teck Hin	4−1	Desa Rhu	Bandar Sri Sendayan
15:15 UTC+8		Report		Stadium: PUSEN City Football Field 'A'

21 July 2024	Rig FC	6−2	Mixstars	Bandar Sri Sendayan
17:15 UTC+8		Report		Stadium: PUSEN City Football Field 'A'

21 July 2024	Herby Crashers	3−0	NS Cyberfox	Bandar Sri Sendayan
17:15 UTC+8				Stadium: PUSEN City Football Field 'A'

===== Matchweek 7 =====
27 July 2024	PUSEN KSRNS	3−1	Bahau Leggha	Bandar Sri Sendayan
15:00 UTC+8				Stadium: PUSEN City Football Field 'A'

27 July 2024	PD United	0−0	Rig FC	Bandar Sri Sendayan
17:00 UTC+8				Stadium: PUSEN City Football Field 'A'

28 July 2024	Teck Hin	3−0	Herby Crashers	Bandar Sri Sendayan
15:00 UTC+8				Stadium: PUSEN City Football Field 'A'

28 July 2024	Mixstars	3−0	RJ United	Bandar Sri Sendayan
17:00 UTC+8				Stadium: PUSEN City Football Field 'A'

28 July 2024	Desa Rhu	3−0	NS Cyberfox	Bandar Sri Sendayan
15:15 UTC+8				Stadium: PUSEN City Football Field 'A'

===== Matchweek 8 =====
3 August 2024	Mixstars	0−0	Desa Rhu	Bandar Sri Sendayan
17:15 UTC+8				Stadium: PUSEN City Football Field 'A'

4 August 2024	Bahau Leggha	4−3	Herby Crashers	Bandar Sri Sendayan
15:15 UTC+8				Stadium: PUSEN City Football Field 'A'

4 August 2024	Teck Hin	2−1	PD United	Bandar Sri Sendayan
17:15 UTC+8				Stadium: PUSEN City Football Field 'A'

2024	PUSEN KSRNS	3−0	RJ United	Bandar Sri Sendayan
--:-- UTC+8				Stadium: PUSEN City Football Field 'A'

2024	Rig FC	3−0	NS Cyberfox	Bandar Sri Sendayan
--:-- UTC+8				Stadium: PUSEN City Football Field 'A'

===== Matchweek 9 =====
10 August 2024	Herby Crashers	4−3	Desa Rhu	Bandar Sri Sendayan
17:15 UTC+8		Report		Stadium: PUSEN City Football Field 'A'

11 August 2024	Bahau Leggha	0−3	Rig FC	Bandar Sri Sendayan
15:15 UTC+8		Report		Stadium: PUSEN City Football Field 'A'

11 August 2024	PUSEN KSRNS	3−2	Mixstars	Bandar Sri Sendayan
17:00 UTC+8		Report		Stadium: PUSEN City Football Field 'A'

2024	PD United	3−0	RJ United	Bandar Sri Sendayan
--:-- UTC+8				Stadium: PUSEN City Football Field 'A'

2024	Tech Hin	3−0	NS Cyberfox	Bandar Sri Sendayan
--:-- UTC+8				Stadium: PUSEN City Football Field 'A'

==== SFL Knock-out stage ====
Semifinals
1	PUSEN KSRNS	2	2	4
4	PD United	2	1	3
2	Rig FC	0	0	0
3	Teck Hin	2	0	2

Final
PUSEN KSRNS	3
Teck Hin	1

===== Semi-finals =====
====== First leg ======
24 August 2024	PUSEN KSRNS	2–2	PD United	Bandar Sri Sendayan
15:15 UTC+8		Report		Stadium: Sendayan Air Base Mini Stadium

24 August 2024	Rig FC	0–2	Teck Hin	Bandar Sri Sendayan
17:15 UTC+8		Report		Stadium: Sendayan Air Base Mini Stadium

====== Second leg ======
8 September 2024	Teck Hin	0–0	Rig FC	Bandar Sri Sendayan
15:00 UTC+8		Report		Stadium: Sendayan Air Base Mini Stadium

8 September 2024	PD United	1–2	PUSEN KSRNS	Bandar Sri Sendayan
17:00 UTC+8		Report		Stadium: Sendayan Air Base Mini Stadium

===== Final =====
22 September 2024	PUSEN KSRNS	3–1	Teck Hin	Paroi
17:00 UTC+8	Shahrul Asmadin 40', 51', 66'	Report	player 71'	Stadium: Tuanku Abdul Rahman Stadium

=== SFL–UiTM NS A3 Community League ===
==== Group stage ====
Pos	Team	Pld	W	D	L	GF	GA	GD	Pts	Promotion, qualification or relegation
1	UiTM NS (C)	9	7	1	1	29	5	+24	22	Advance to Final
2	PD United	9	6	3	0	24	8	+16	21	Advance to Final
3	Teck Hin FC II	9	6	2	1	21	8	+13	20	
4	NSFC U18	9	5	2	2	17	10	+7	17	
5	Yayasan NS	9	4	2	3	32	17	+15	14	
6	Seremban City	9	4	2	3	21	18	+3	14	
7	Mixstars FC	9	2	2	5	12	16	−4	8	
8	Herby Crashers FC	9	2	0	7	9	43	−34	6	
9	Pemuda Jempol FC	9	1	2	6	10	23	−13	5	
10	Senawang FC	9	0	0	9	0	27	−27	0	

Updated to match(es) played on 6 January 2025. Source: SFL-uitmns A3 community league
Rules for classification: 1) Points; 2) Goal difference; 3) Number of goals scored.
(C) Champions

==== Final ====
19 January 2025	UiTM NS	1–0	PD United	Paroi
16:00 UTC+8		Report		Stadium: Tuanku Abdul Rahman Stadium

== North & East Coast Zone ==
=== Perlis Super League ===
Perlis Super League
- Season: 2024–25
- Champions: Bintong F.C.
- Promoted: Bintong F.C. Kuala Perlis Titans

Pos	Team	Pld	W	D	L	GF	GA	GD	Pts	Promotion, qualification or relegation
1	Bintong F.C. (C)	7	6	1	0	16	4	+12	19	Promotion to A2 Amateur League
2	Kuala Perlis Titans F.C.	7	6	0	1	19	2	+17	18	Promotion to A2 Amateur League
3	Anak Nelayan Seberang Ramai	7	4	2	1	18	8	+10	14	
4	Arau City	7	2	3	2	10	13	−3	9	
5	Juang Kayang	7	2	2	3	7	8	−1	8	
6	Kangar City	7	2	1	4	9	15	−6	7	
7	KSMR Kangar	7	1	1	5	4	11	−7	4	
8	Suria Paya United	7	0	0	7	4	26	−22	0	

Updated to match(es) played on 6 October 2024. Source: MSN Perlis
Rules for classification: 1) Points; 2) Goal difference; 3) Number of goals scored.
(C) Champions

=== Fixtures and results ===
Match

=== Matchweek 1 ===
5 July 2024	KSMR Kangar	1−2	Anak Nelayan SR	Kangar
21:00 UTC+8		Report		Stadium: Tuanku Syed Putra Stadium

6 July 2024	Kangar City	1−1	Arau City	Kangar
17:00 UTC+8		Report		Stadium: Football Field 'A' TSP Sports Complex

6 July 2024	Suria Paya	0−3	Kuala Perlis Titans	Simpang Empat
17:00 UTC+8		Report		Stadium: MPK Football Field

7 July 2024	Juang Kayang	1−3	Bintong	Kangar
17:00 UTC+8		Report		Stadium: Football Field 'A' TSP Sports Complex

=== Matchweek 2 ===
13 July 2024	Kangar City	0−2	Juang Kayang	Kangar
17:00 UTC+8		Report		Stadium: Football Field 'A' TSP Sports Complex

13 July 2024	Anak Nelayan SR	2−2	Bintong	Simpang Empat
17:00 UTC+8		Report		Stadium: MPK Football Field

14 July 2024	Kuala Perlis Titans	5−0	Arau City	Kangar
17:00 UTC+8		Report		Stadium: Football Field 'A' TSP Sports Complex

14 July 2024	KSMR Kangar	2−0	Suria Paya United	Simpang Empat
17:00 UTC+8		Report		Stadium: MPK Football Field

=== Matchweek 3 ===
20 July 2024	Kangar City	5−0	Suria Paya United	Kangar
21:00 UTC+8		Report		Stadium: Tuanku Syed Putra Stadium

20 July 2024	Anak Nelayan SR	1−1	Arau City	Kangar
17:00 UTC+8		Report		Stadium: Football Field 'A' TSP Sports Complex

20 July 2024	Juang Kayang	0−1	Kuala Perlis Titans	Simpang Empat
17:00 UTC+8		Report		Stadium: MPK Football Field

21 July 2024	Bintong	2−0	KSMR Kangar	Kangar
17:00 UTC+8		Report		Stadium: Football Field 'A' TSP Sports Complex

=== Matchweek 4 ===
7 September 2024	Arau City	1−1	Juang Kayang	Kangar
21:00 UTC+8		Report		Stadium: Tuanku Syed Putra Stadium

7 September 2024	Suria Paya United	0−3	Bintong	Kangar
17:00 UTC+8		Report		Stadium: Football Field 'A' TSP Sports Complex

7 September 2024	Anak Nelayan SR	1−3	Kuala Perlis Titans	Simpang Empat
17:00 UTC+8		Report		Stadium: MPK Football Field

8 September 2024	KSMR Kangar	1−2	Kangar City	Kangar
17:00 UTC+8		Report		Stadium: Football Field 'A' TSP Sports Complex

=== Matchweek 5 ===
13 September 2024	Kangar City	1−5	Anak Nelayan SR	Kangar
17:00 UTC+8		Report		Stadium: Football Field 'A' TSP Sports Complex

14 September 2024	Arau City	1−0	KSMR Kangar	Kangar
17:00 UTC+8		Report		Stadium: Football Field 'A' TSP Sports Complex

22 September 2024	Suria Paya United	1−3	Juang Kayang	Kangar
17:00 UTC+8		Report		Stadium: Football Field 'A' TSP Sports Complex

2 October 2024	Bintong	1−0	Kuala Perlis Titans	Kangar
21:00 UTC+8		Report		Stadium: Tuanku Syed Putra Stadium

=== Matchweek 6 ===
28 September 2024	Anak Nelayan SR	5−0	Suria Paya United	Kangar
17:00 UTC+8		Report		Stadium: Football Field 'A' TSP Sports Complex

28 September 2024	Arau City	1−2	Bintong	Simpang Empat
17:00 UTC+8		Report		Stadium: MPK Football Field

29 September 2024	Juang Kayang	0−0	KSMR Kangar	Kangar
17:00 UTC+8		Report		Stadium: Football Field 'A' TSP Sports Complex

29 September 2024	Kuala Perlis Titans	3−0	Kangar City	Simpang Empat
17:00 UTC+8		Report		Stadium: MPK Football Field

=== Matchweek 7 ===
5 October 2024	Kuala Perlis Titans	4−0	KSMR Kangar	Kangar
16:45 UTC+8		Report		Stadium: Football Field 'A' TSP Sports Complex

5 October 2024	Bintong	3−0	Kangar City	Simpang Empat
16:45 UTC+8		Report		Stadium: MPK Football Field

6 October 2024	Arau City	5−3	Suria Paya United	Kangar
17:00 UTC+8		Report		Stadium: Football Field 'A' TSP Sports Complex

6 October 2024	Juang Kayang	0−2	Anak Nelayan SR	Simpang Empat
17:00 UTC+8		Report		Stadium: MPK Football Field

=== PUC A3 Kelantan Champions League ===
==== Group stage ====
===== Zone A =====
Pos	Team	Pld	W	D	L	GF	GA	GD	Pts	Promotion, qualification or relegation
1	AZM Rovers F.C. (P)	8	6	2	0	27	6	+21	20	Advance to Final & Promotion to A2 Amateur League
2	Jeli	8	5	2	1	17	5	+12	17	
3	Kubang Tuman	8	5	2	1	14	7	+7	17	
4	KEHL	8	3	1	4	12	17	−5	10	
5	Batu 30	8	3	0	5	9	14	−5	9	
6	Pembangunan USM KK	8	2	2	4	9	20	−11	8	
7	Sri Selising	8	2	1	5	12	15	−3	7	
8	Kijang Muda	8	2	1	5	12	17	−5	7	
9	LFC Kelantan	8	2	1	5	11	22	−11	7	

Updated to match(es) played on 28 September 2024. Source: Liga Sukan PUC
Rules for classification: 1) Points; 2) Goal difference; 3) Number of goals scored.
(P) Promoted

===== Zone B =====
Pos	Team	Pld	W	D	L	GF	GA	GD	Pts	Promotion, qualification or relegation
1	Jebeng F.C. (C)	8	5	1	2	20	12	+8	16	Advance to Final
2	PUC B12	8	5	1	2	13	11	+2	16	
3	Chandik	8	3	4	1	18	11	+7	13	
4	Nasrom	8	4	1	3	17	12	+5	13	
5	Kota Bharu Timur	8	3	4	1	13	10	+3	13	
6	Nasken Coffee	8	3	3	2	14	9	+5	12	
7	Bomba Kelantan	8	2	2	4	11	11	0	8	
8	Sri Sador	8	2	2	4	12	23	−11	8	
9	Ketereh	8	0	0	8	5	24	−19	0	

Updated to match(es) played on 27 September 2024. Source: Liga Sukan PUC
Rules for classification: 1) Points; 2) Goal difference; 3) Number of goals scored.
(C) Champions

==== Fixtures and results ====
Zone A Match

=== Matchweek 1 ===
21 June 2024	KEHL FC	3−1	Sri Selinsing	Kota Bharu
17:00 UTC+8		Report		Stadium: Penjara Mini Stadium

21 June 2024	Pembangunan USMKK	0−1	Batu 30	Tendong, Pasir Mas
17:00 UTC+8		Report		Stadium: WTS Football Field

21 June 2024	Kijang Muda	0−1	Kubang Tuman	Kota Bharu
17:00 UTC+8		Report		Stadium: Padang Pertanian Lundang

21 June 2024	AZM Rovers	2−1	Jeli FC	Kota Bharu
21:00 UTC+8		Report		Stadium: Sultan Muhammad IV Stadium

=== Matchweek 2 ===
28 June 2024	LFC Kelantan	2−0	Kijang Muda	Tendong, Pasir Mas
17:00 UTC+8				Stadium: WTS Football Field

29 June 2024	Jeli FC	1−1	Kubang Tuman	Tendong, Pasir Mas
17:00 UTC+8		Report		Stadium: WTS Football Field

29 June 2024	Batu 30	0−2	KEHL FC	Kubang Kerian
17:00 UTC+8		Report		Stadium: Padang SMK Kubang Kerian 2

=== Matchweek 3 ===
5 July 2024	KEHL FC	0−2	Kubang Tuman	Tendong, Pasir Mas
17:00 UTC+8		Report		Stadium: WTS Football Field

6 July 2024	AZM Rovers	4−0	LFC Kelantan	Pengkalan Chepa
17:00 UTC+8		Report		Stadium: Stadium Mini Penjara

6 July 2024	Sri Selising	1−1	Pembangunan USM KK	Kota Bharu
17:00 UTC+8		Report		Stadium: Padang Pertanian Lundang

=== Matchweek 4 ===
12 July 2024	Batu 30	0−3	AZM Rovers	Kota Bharu
16:45 UTC+8		Report		Stadium: Padang Pertanian Lundang

13 July 2024	Sri Selising	2−3	LFC Kelantan	Tendong, Pasir Mas
16:45 UTC+8		Report		Stadium: WTS Football Field

13 July 2024	Kijang Muda	1−2	Pembangunan USM KK	Pengkalan Chepa
16:45 UTC+8		Report		Stadium: Stadium Mini Penjara

=== Matchweek 5 ===
19 July 2024	Jeli	4−0	Pembangunan USMKK	Tendong, Pasir Mas
16:45 UTC+8		Report		Stadium: WTS Football Field

20 July 2024	AZM Rovers	1−0	Sri Selising	Kota Bharu
16:45 UTC+8		Report		Stadium: Padang Pertanian Lundang

=== Matchweek 6 ===
26 July 2024	KEHL	4−2	LFC Kelantan	Tendong, Pasir Mas
16:45 UTC+8				Stadium: WTS Football Field

26 July 2024	Sri Selising	2−0	Kubang Tuman	Pengkalan Chepa
16:45 UTC+8				Stadium: Stadium Mini Penjara

27 July 2024	Kijang Muda	1−3	FC Batu 30	Kota Bharu
16:45 UTC+8				Stadium: Padang Pertanian Lundang

=== Matchweek 7 ===
2 August 2024	AZM Rovers	2−2	Kubang Tuman	Tendong, Pasir Mas
16:45 UTC+8		Report		Stadium: WTS Football Field

3 August 2024	Jeli	2−0	KEHL	Kota Bharu
16:45 UTC+8		Report		Stadium: Padang Pertanian Lundang

3 August 2024	Batu 30	3−1	LFC Kelantan	Pengkalan Chepa
16:45 UTC+8		Report		Stadium: Stadium Mini Penjara

==== Matchweek 8 ====
9 August 2024	Batu 30	1−2	Sri Selising	Kota Bharu
16:45 UTC+8		Report		Stadium: Padang Pertanian Lundang

=== Matchweek 9 ===
16 August 2024	Jeli	0−0	Kijang Muda	Pengkalan Chepa
16:45 UTC+8		Report		Stadium: Stadium Mini Penjara

16 August 2024	LFC Kelantan	1−4	Kubang Tuman	Kota Bharu
16:45 UTC+8		Report		Stadium: Padang Pertanian Lundang

17 August 2024	AZM Rovers	1−1	KEHL FC	Pengkalan Chepa
16:45 UTC+8		Report		Stadium: Stadium Mini Penjara

=== Matchweek 10 ===
23 August 2024	Batu 30	1−2	Kubang Tuman	Tendong, Pasir Mas
16:45 UTC+8		Report		Stadium: WTS Football Field

23 August 2024	Pembangunan USMKK	2−2	LFC Kelantan	Kota Bharu
16:45 UTC+8		Report		Stadium: Padang Pertanian Lundang

24 August 2024	Kijang Muda	3−2	Sri Selising	Kota Bharu
16:45 UTC+8		Report		Stadium: Padang Pertanian Lundang

=== Matchweek 11 ===
6 September 2024	Pembangunan USMKK	1−8	AZM Rovers	Kota Bharu
16:45 UTC+8		Report		Stadium: Perdana Football Field

7 September 2024	KEHL FC	1−6	Kijang Muda	Kota Bharu
16:45 UTC+8		Report		Stadium: Padang Pertanian Lundang

=== Matchweek 12 ===
13 September 2024	Kubang Tuman	2−0	Pembangunan USMKK	Kota Bharu
16:45 UTC+8		Report		Stadium: Padang Pertanian Lundang

14 September 2024	Jeli	3−0	LFC Kelantan	Kota Bharu
16:45 UTC+8		Report		Stadium: Perdana Football Field

=== Matchweek 13 ===
20 September 2024	Pembangunan USMKK	3−1	KEHL FC	Kota Bharu
16:45 UTC+8		Report		Stadium: Perdana Football Field

21 September 2024	Jeli	3−2	Sri Selising	Kota Bharu
16:45 UTC+8		Report		Stadium: Perdana Football Field

=== Matchweek 14 ===
28 September 2024	Kijang Muda	1−6	AZM Rovers	Kota Bharu
16:45 UTC+8		Report		Stadium: Perdana Football Field

Zone B Match

=== Matchweek 1 ===
22 June 2024	Chandik FC	4−1	Ketereh FC	Kota Bharu
17:00 UTC+8		Report		Stadium: Perdana Football Field

22 June 2024	Nasken Cofee	1−1	Sri Sador	Kota Bharu
17:00 UTC+8		Report		Stadium: Padang Pertanian Lundang

22 June 2024	Nasrom FC	2−0	Bomba Kelantan	Kota Bharu
17:00 UTC+8		Report		Stadium: Penjara Mini Stadium

28 June 2024	Jebeng FC	2−1	Kota Bharu Timur	Kubang Kerian
17:00 UTC+8		Report		Stadium: Padang SMK Kubang Kerian 2

=== Matchweek 2 ===
28 June 2024	PUC B12	0−3	Chandik FC	Kota Bharu
17:00 UTC+8		Report		Stadium: Padang Pertanian Lundang

29 June 2024	Nasken Coffee	5−1	Ketereh FC	Kota Bharu
17:00 UTC+8		Report		Stadium: Padang Pertanian Lundang

=== Matchweek 3 ===
5 July 2024	Sri Sador	0−2	PUC B12	Pengkalan Chepa
17:00 UTC+8		Report		Stadium: Stadium Mini Penjara

5 July 2024	Jebeng FC	2−1	Bomba Kelantan	Kota Bharu
17:00 UTC+8		Report		Stadium: Padang Pertanian Lundang

6 July 2024	Kota Bharu Timur	1−1	Nasrom FC	Kota Bharu
17:00 UTC+8		Report		Stadium: Padang Majlis Daerah Ketereh

=== Matchweek 4 ===
12 July 2024	Jebeng	1−0	Ketereh	Pengkalan Chepa
16:45 UTC+8		Report		Stadium: Stadium Mini Penjara

12 July 2024	Bomba Kelantan	2−3	Sri Sador	Tendong, Pasir Mas
16:45 UTC+8		Report		Stadium: WTS Football Field

13 July 2024	Kota Bharu Timur	1−1	PUC B15	Kota Bharu
16:45 UTC+8		Report		Stadium: Padang Pertanian Lundang

=== Matchweek 5 ===
19 July 2024	Bomba Kelantan	2−2	Nasken Coffee	Kota Bharu
16:45 UTC+8		Report		Stadium: Padang Pertanian Lundang

19 July 2024	PUC B12	2−1	Jebeng	Pengkalan Chepa
16:45 UTC+8		Report		Stadium: Stadium Mini Penjara

20 July 2024	Chandik	1−3	Nasrom	Tendong, Pasir Mas
16:45 UTC+8		Report		Stadium: WTS Football Field

20 July 2024	Sri Sador	1−1	Kota Bharu Timur	Pengkalan Chepa
16:45 UTC+8		Report		Stadium: Stadium Mini Penjara

=== Matchweek 6 ===
26 July 2024	Nasrom	0−1	Nasken Coffee	Kota Bharu
16:45 UTC+8				Stadium: Padang Pertanian Lundang

27 July 2024	Ketereh	1−3	Kota Bharu Timur	Tendong, Pasir Mas
16:45 UTC+8				Stadium: WTS Football Field

27 July 2024	Bomba Kelantan	0−0	Chandik	Pengkalan Chepa
16:45 UTC+8				Stadium: Stadium Mini Penjara

=== Matchweek 7 ===
2 August 2024	Nasrom	3−5	PUC B12	Kota Bharu
16:45 UTC+8		Report		Stadium: Padang Pertanian Lundang

2 August 2024	Nasken Coffee	3−1	Jebeng	Pengkalan Chepa
16:45 UTC+8		Report		Stadium: Stadium Mini Penjara

=== Matchweek 8 ===
9 August 2024	Sri Sador	3−1	Ketereh	Pengkalan Chepa
16:45 UTC+8		Report		Stadium: Stadium Mini Penjara

10 August 2024	Bomba Kelantan	1−2	Kota Bharu Timur	Tendong, Pasir Mas
16:45 UTC+8		Report		Stadium: WTS Football Field

10 August 2024	Chandik	1−1	Nasken Coffee	Kota Bharu
16:45 UTC+8		Report		Stadium: Padang Pertanian Lundang

10 August 2024	Nasrom	1−2	Jebeng	Pengkalan Chepa
16:45 UTC+8		Report		Stadium: Stadium Mini Penjara

=== Matchweek 9 ===
17 August 2024	PUC B12	2−1	Ketereh	Kota Bharu
16:45 UTC+8		Report		Stadium: Padang Pertanian Lundang

=== Matchweek 10 ===
23 August 2024	Chandik	4−1	Sri Sador	Pengkalan Chepa
16:45 UTC+8		Report		Stadium: Stadium Mini Penjara

24 August 2024	Nasken Coffee	1−2	Kota Bharu Timur	Tendong, Pasir Mas
16:45 UTC+8		Report		Stadium: WTS Football Field

=== Matchweek 11 ===
6 September 2024	Nasrom	4−2	Sri Sador	Kota Bharu
16:45 UTC+8		Report		Stadium: Padang Pertanian Lundang

7 September 2024	Chandik	3−3	Jebeng	Kota Bharu
16:45 UTC+8		Report		Stadium: Perdana Football Field

=== Matchweek 12 ===
13 September 2024	PUC B12	0−2	Bomba Kelantan	Kota Bharu
16:45 UTC+8		Report		Stadium: Perdana Football Field

14 September 2024	Chandik	2−2	Kota Bharu Timur	Kota Bharu
16:45 UTC+8		Report		Stadium: Padang Pertanian Lundang

=== Matchweek 13 ===
20 September 2024	Jebeng	8−1	Sri Sador	Kota Bharu
16:45 UTC+8		Report		Stadium: Padang Pertanian Lundang

21 September 2024	Ketereh	v	Nasrom	Kota Bharu
16:45 UTC+8				Stadium: Padang Pertanian Lundang

=== Matchweek 14 ===
27 September 2024	PUC B12	1−0	Nasken Coffee	Kota Bharu
16:45 UTC+8		Report		Stadium: Perdana Football Field

==== FinalPUC ====
28 February 2025	AZM Rovers F.C.	1–4	Jebeng F.C.	Kota Bharu
16:45 UTC+8		Report		Stadium: Sultan Muhammad IV Stadium

=== Pahang Amateur League ===
Pahang Amateur League
- Season: 2024–25
- Champions: Raub F.C.
- Promoted: Raub F.C. Kuantan City FC

==== Group stage ====
===== Zone 1 (West) =====
Pos	Team	Pld	W	D	L	GF	GA	GD	Pts	Qualification or relegation
1	Nextgame Bentong FC	8	5	3	0	11	3	+8	18	Advance to knock-out stage
2	STW Jelai FC	8	5	0	3	9	5	+4	15	Advance to knock-out stage
3	Raub F.C. (C, P)	8	3	3	2	11	5	+6	12	Knock-out stage & Promotion to A2 Amateur League
4	FC Wagga	8	2	1	5	4	15	−11	7	
5	Bandar 32 Bera	8	0	3	5	3	10	−7	3	

Updated to match(es) played on 14 September 2024. Source: MY Liga Pahang
Rules for classification: 1) Points; 2) Goal difference; 3) Number of goals scored.
(C) Champions; (P) Promoted

===== Zone 2 (Central) =====
Pos	Team	Pld	W	D	L	GF	GA	GD	Pts	Qualification or relegation
1	Eryna Tomyam Jengka FC	8	5	2	1	19	6	+13	17	Advance to knock-out stage
2	Jerantut FC	8	6	1	1	28	5	+23	19	Advance to knock-out stage
3	Sri Tonkin FC	8	3	2	3	16	11	+5	11	Advance to knock-out stage
4	Gelanggi FC	8	3	1	4	12	12	0	10	
5	Heero Academy	8	0	0	8	4	45	−41	0	

Updated to match(es) played on 8 September 2024. Source: MY Liga Pahang
Rules for classification: 1) Points; 2) Goal difference; 3) Number of goals scored.

===== Zone 3 (East) =====
Pos	Team	Pld	W	D	L	GF	GA	GD	Pts	Promotion, qualification or relegation
1	Yayasan Pahang FC	6	5	0	1	10	5	+5	15	Advance to knock-out stage
2	Kuantan City FC	6	4	0	2	10	4	+6	12	Knock-out stage & Promotion to A2 Amateur League
3	Belacan Pekan FC	6	1	2	3	6	11	−5	5	
4	MFT	6	0	2	4	4	10	−6	2	

Updated to match(es) played on 8 September 2024. Source: MY Liga Pahang
Rules for classification: 1) Points; 2) Goal difference; 3) Number of goals scored.

==== Pahang Amateur League knockout stage ====
Quarterfinals
Nextgame	2 (4)
Kuantan City	2 (3)
FC Jerantut	2 (2)
Raub	2 (3)
Yayasan Pahang	2 (4)
Sri Tonkin	2 (5)
STW Jelai	1 (1)
Eryna Tomyam	1 (4)

Semifinals
Nextgame	0
Raub	1
Sri Tonkin	1
Eryna Tomyam	0

Final
Raub	3
Sri Tonkin	1

=== Quarter-finals ===
21 September 2024	Nextgame	2–2 (4–3 p)	Kuantan City	Bandar Tun Razak, Jengka
17:00 UTC+8		Report		Stadium: Tun Abdul Razak Stadium

21 September 2024	Yayasan Pahang	2–2 (4–5 p)	Sri Tonkin	Bandar Tun Razak, Jengka
20:00 UTC+8		Report		Stadium: Tun Abdul Razak Stadium

22 September 2024	FC Jerantut	2–2 (2–3 p)	Raub	Bandar Tun Razak, Jengka
17:00 UTC+8		Report		Stadium: Tun Abdul Razak Stadium

22 September 2024	STW Jelai	1–1 (1–4 p)	Eryna Tomyam	Bandar Tun Razak, Jengka
20:00 UTC+8		Report		Stadium: Tun Abdul Razak Stadium

=== Semi-finals ===
28 September 2024	Nextgame	0–1	Raub	Bandar Tun Razak, Jengka
20:00 UTC+8		Report	Zaiful Zakwan 42'	Stadium: Tun Abdul Razak Stadium

28 September 2024	Sri Tonkin	1–0	Eryna Tomyam	Bandar Tun Razak, Jengka
22:00 UTC+8	Shah Amirul 76' (pen.)	Report		Stadium: Tun Abdul Razak Stadium

=== Final ===
19 October 2024	Raub	3–1	Sri Tonkin	Bandar Tun Razak, Jengka
20:00 UTC+8		Report		Stadium: Tun Abdul Razak Stadium

== Central Zone ==
=== A Ligue Champions League ===
A Ligue Champions League
- Season: 2024–25
- Champions: Baarz F.C.

==== Group stage ====
===== Zone KL Centre =====
Pos	Team	Pld	W	D	L	GF	GA	GD	Pts	Promotion, qualification or relegation
1	Asawa FC	9	7	2	0	22	5	+17	23	Advance to knockout stage
2	Obi & Friends FC	9	7	0	2	33	10	+23	21	Advance to knockout stage
3	OSV UK	9	7	0	2	25	12	+13	21	Advance to knockout stage
4	R.A.S Galacticos	9	6	1	2	26	9	+17	19	Advance to knockout stage
5	HE Clinic FC	9	3	4	2	26	12	+14	13	
6	De' Haramain UBFC	9	3	2	4	17	22	−5	11	
7	Victoria Institution FC	9	3	1	5	12	24	−12	10	
8	Damansara Bulls FC	9	1	1	7	12	35	−23	4	
9	KBC FC	9	0	3	6	9	23	−14	3	
10	Bawean City FC	9	0	2	7	8	38	−30	2	

Updated to match(es) played on 26 August 2024. Source: A-Ligue
Rules for classification: 1) Points; 2) Goal difference; 3) Number of goals scored.

===== Zone Bangi =====
Pos	Team	Pld	W	D	L	GF	GA	GD	Pts	Promotion, qualification or relegation
1	Copa FC	7	6	1	0	20	7	+13	19	Advance to knockout stage
2	NSE FC	7	7	0	0	32	3	+29	21	Advance to knockout stage
3	Slimsfoot FC	7	4	1	2	17	10	+7	13	Advance to knockout stage
4	Sunway University FC	7	3	1	3	6	8	−2	10	Advance to knockout stage
5	The Gathers	7	4	0	3	12	13	−1	9 (Note: The Gathers have been docked three points.)	
6	Nadi Sepang FC	7	1	1	5	6	15	−9	4	
7	KVC FC	7	1	1	5	7	18	−11	4	
8	Gators FC	7	0	1	6	7	28	−21	1	

Updated to match(es) played on 11 August 2024. Source: A-Ligue
Rules for classification: 1) Points; 2) Goal difference; 3) Number of goals scored.

===== Zone Subang =====
Pos	Team	Pld	W	D	L	GF	GA	GD	Pts	Promotion, qualification or relegation
1	Neo X FC	10	8	2	0	30	10	+20	26	Advance to knockout stage
2	Subang Rhino's FC	10	5	3	2	21	15	+6	18	Advance to knockout stage
3	Visionary FC	10	3	4	3	24	17	+7	13	Advance to knockout stage
4	Shah Alam Rovers FC	10	4	4	2	18	12	+6	13 (Note: Shah Alam Rovers have been docked three points.)	Advance to knockout stage
5	Ukay Positive II FC	10	2	2	6	16	19	−3	8	
6	Kickers FC	10	0	1	9	4	40	−36	1	

Updated to match(es) played on 8 September 2024. Source: A-Ligue
Rules for classification: 1) Points; 2) Goal difference; 3) Number of goals scored.

===== Zone Serdang =====
Pos	Team	Pld	W	D	L	GF	GA	GD	Pts	Promotion, qualification or relegation
1	Baarz F.C. (C)	10	9	0	1	46	2	+44	27	Advance to knockout stage
2	Black Jack FC	10	8	1	1	36	5	+31	25	Advance to knockout stage
3	Bujangga FC	10	6	1	3	43	14	+29	19	Advance to knockout stage
4	Hydra FC	10	4	0	6	18	33	−15	12	Advance to knockout stage
5	MY Valencia CF	10	1	0	9	6	23	−17	3	
6	Onca FC	10	1	0	9	7	79	−72	3	

Updated to match(es) played on 29 August 2024. Source: A-Ligue
Rules for classification: 1) Points; 2) Goal difference; 3) Number of goals scored.
(C) Champions

==== A Ligue Knock-out stage ====
Round16
Shah Alam Rovers	1	1	2 (4)
Asawa	1	1	2 (5)
NSE FC	0	0	0
Bujangga	1	1	2
OSV UK	2	2	4
Subang Rhinos	1	1	2
Sunway University	0	0	0
Baarz	2	1	3
Copa FC	3	3	6
Hydra FT	0	0	0
Obi & Friends	4	1	5
Visionary	2	1	3
Slimsfoot	1	1	2
Black Jack	2	1	3
R.A.S Galaticos	2	0	2
Neo X	4	0	4

Quarterfinals
Asawa	1	0	1 (2)
Bujangga	0	1	1 (4)
OSV UK	0	1	1
Baarz	3	1	4
Copa FC	1	2	3
Obi & Friends	3	2	5
Black Jack	7	2	9
Neo X	1	1	2

Semifinal
Bujangga	0	0	0
Baarz	1	4	5
Obi & Friends	1	1	2 (4)
Black Jack	2	0	2 (3)

Final
Baarz	0 (4)
Obi & Friends	0 (2)

=== MAHSA A3 Community League ===
MAHSA A3 Community League
- Season: 2024–25
- Champions: FR One Four F.C.
- Promoted: FR One Four F.C.

Pos	Team	Pld	W	D	L	GF	GA	GD	Pts
1	FR One Four F.C. (C)	8	7	0	1	21	2	+19	21
2	MARS	8	6	1	1	26	7	+19	19
3	NSE	8	5	1	2	20	5	+15	16
4	MAHSA City	8	5	0	3	14	11	+3	15
5	KL Passion	8	4	1	3	12	7	+5	13
6	Real Cyber	8	2	1	5	7	20	−13	7
7	Destiny FDC	8	1	2	5	8	16	−8	5
8	Bandar Saujana Putra F.C.	8	1	2	5	8	23	−15	5
9	Armada Belia Pandan	8	0	2	6	3	28	−25	2

Updated to match(es) played on 18 December 2024. Source: NSE FC Official
Rules for classification: 1) Points; 2) Goal difference; 3) Number of goals scored.
(C) Champions

=== Putrajaya A3 Community League ===
Putrajaya A3 Community League
- Season: 2024–25
- Champions: MOF-Sungai Merab FC
- Promoted: MOF-Sungai Merab FC

Pos	Team	Pld	W	D	L	GF	GA	GD	Pts	Promotion, qualification or relegation
1	MOF-Sungai Merab FC (C)	9	9	0	0	31	3	+28	27	Promotion to A2 Amateur League
2	ICMS Titans	9	7	0	2	20	7	+13	21	
3	Putrajaya FA U19	9	6	2	1	37	10	+27	20	
4	Krisputra PPJ	9	4	3	2	26	11	+15	15	
5	Putrajaya United	9	4	2	3	19	13	+6	14	
6	Red White FC	9	4	2	3	18	16	+2	14	
7	Hospital Putrajaya FC	9	3	0	6	11	19	−8	9	
8	APM FC	9	1	2	6	10	25	−15	5	
9	T.T. United	9	1	0	8	4	30	−26	3	
10	Superfriends FC	9	0	1	8	3	45	−42	1	

Updated to match(es) played on 18 January 2025. Source: FA Putrajaya
Rules for classification: 1) Points; 2) Goal difference; 3) Number of goals scored.
(C) Champions

== See also ==
- 2024 Piala Sumbangsih
- 2024–25 Malaysia Super League
- 2024–25 Malaysia A1 Semi-Pro League
- 2024–25 Malaysia A2 Amateur League
- 2024–25 Piala Presiden
- 2024–25 Piala Belia
