= List of schools in Perlis =

This is a list of schools in Perlis, Malaysia. It is categorised according to the variants of schools in Malaysia, and is arranged alphabetically.

== Private schools ==
- Harvest Academy (International)
- Sekolah Rendah Islam At Taqwa (SRI AT TAQWA)
- Sekolah Rendah Islam 1 (SRI 1)
- Sekolah Agama Al Islahiyah (Rendah) (SAIR)
- Sekolah Rendah Agama At Tarbiyah Al Islamiyah (SRAATI)
- Ma'had Attarbiyah al-Islamiyah (MATRI)
- Sekolah Menengah Agama Al-Madrasah Al-Alawiyah Ad-Diniah (AL MAAD)
- Sekolah Agama Al Islahiyah (Menengah) (SA AL ISLAHIYAH MENENGAH)

== Islamic religious schools ==
=== Secondary education: Sekolah Menengah Kebangsaan Agama (SMKA) ===
- Sekolah Menengah Kebangsaan Agama (P) Kangar
- Sekolah Menengah Kebangsaan Agama Arau

== National schools ==
=== Primary education: Sekolah Kebangsaan (SK) ===
- Sekolah Kebangsaan Dato' Kayaman
- Sekolah Kebangsaan Behor Empiang
- Sekolah Kebangsaan Abi
- Sekolah Kebangsaan Kuala Perlis
- Sekolah Kebangsaan Padang Besar (Selatan)
- Sekolah Kebangsaan Padang Melangit
- Sekolah Kebangsaan Simpang Empat
- Sekolah Rendah Kebangsaan Seri Indera
- Sekolah Kebangsaan Stella Maris
- Sekolah Kebangsaan Sungai Baru
- Sekolah Kebangsaan Utan Aji
- Sekolah Kebangsaan Jejawi
- Sekolah Kebangsaan Beseri
- Sekolah Kebangsaan Paya
- Sekolah kebangsaan Sungai Berembang
- Sekolah Kebangsaan Santan
- Sekolah Kebangsaan Kampung Salang
- Sekolah Kebangsaan Batu Bertangkup
- Sekolah Kebangsaan Behor Mali
- Sekolah Kebangsaan Arau
- Sekolah Kebangsaan Bintong
- Sekolah Kebangsaan Bukit Keteri
- Sekolah Kebangsaan Changkat Jawi
- Sekolah Kebangsaan Chuping
- Sekolah Kebangsaan Dato' Ahmad Musa
- Sekolah Kebangsaan Dato' wan Ahmad
- Sekolah Kebangsaan Felda Mata Ayer
- Sekolah Kebangsaan Felda Rimba Mas
- Sekolah Kebangsaan Guar Jentik
- Sekolah Kebangsaan Guar Nangka
- Sekolah Kebangsaan Jelempok
- Sekolah Kebangsaan Jalan Raja Syed Alwi
- Sekolah Kebangsaan Jalan Raja Syed Saffi
- Sekolah Kebangsaan Kampung Serdang
- Sekolah Kebangsaan Kayang
- Sekolah Kebangsaan Kubang Gajah
- Sekolah Kebangsaan LKTP Chuping
- Sekolag Kebangsaan Long Boh
- Sekolah Kebangsaan Lubuk Sireh
- Sekolah Kebangsaan Oran
- Sekolah Kebangsaan Padang Besar Utara
- Sekolah Kebangsaan Padang Keria
- Sekolah Kebangsaan Padang Kota
- Sekolah Kebangsaan Panggas
- Sekolah Kebangsaan Panggau
- Sekolah Kebangsaan Pauh
- Sekolah Kebangsaan Pendidikan Khas
- Sekolah Kebangsaan Putra
- Sekolah Kebangsaan Raja (P) Budriah
- Sekolah Kebangsaan Sanglang
- Sekolah Kebangsaan Seberang Ramai
- Sekolah Kebangsaan Sena
- Sekolah Kebangsaan Seri Perlis
- Sekolah Kebangsaan Seri Tunjung
- Sekolah Kebangsaan Sungai Baru
- Sekolah Kebangsaan Tambun Tulang
- Sekolah Kebangsaan Tengku Budriah
- Sekolah Kebangsaan Titi Tinggi
- Sekolah Kebangsaan Titi Tok Bandar
- Sekolah Kebangsaan Ujung Batu

=== Secondary education: Sekolah Menengah Kebangsaan (SMK) ===
School code	School name	Postcode	Area	Coordinates
REA0080	SMK Abi	01000	Kangar	6.4954°N 100.2059°E
REA0078	SMK Arau	02600	Arau	6.4238°N 100.2760°E
REA0085	SMK Beseri	02400	Kangar	6.5544°N 100.2435°E
REA0083	SMK Dato' Ali Ahmad	01000	Kangar	6.4281°N 100.1737°E
REA0054	SMK Dato' Sheikh Ahmad	02600	Arau	6.4384°N 100.2670°E
REA0077	SMK Datuk Jaafar Hassan	02450	Bukit Keteri	6.5250°N 100.2610°E
REE0059	SMK Derma	01000	Kangar	6.4420°N 100.1931°E
REA0087	SMK Guar Nangka	02500	Kangar	6.4868°N 100.2892°E
REA0076	SMK Kuala Perlis	02000	Kuala Perlis	6.3954°N 100.1360°E
REA0086	SMK Mata Ayer	02500	Mata Ayer	6.4822°N 100.2512°E
REA0081	SMK Padang Besar Utara	02100	Padang Besar	6.6503°N 100.3166°E
REB0058	SMJK Perlis	01000	Kangar	6.4306°N 100.1980°E
REB0057	SMK Putra	01000	Kangar	6.4436°N 100.1850°E
REA0074	SMK Raja Puan Muda Tengku Fauziah	02200	Kaki Bukit	6.6346°N 100.2210°E
REA0079	SMK Sanglang	02800	Simpang Empat	6.2984°N 100.2041°E
REA0055	SMK Syed Ahmad	02600	Arau	6.3825°N 100.2455°E
REE0060	SMK Syed Alwi	01000	Kangar	6.3952°N 100.1831°E
REA0056	SMK Syed Hassan	01000	Kangar	6.4475°N 100.2014°E
REE0061	SMK Syed Saffi	02700	Simpang Empat	6.3314°N 100.1919°E
REE0062	SMK Syed Sirajuddin	02600	Arau	6.4458°N 100.2390°E
REA0082	SMK Tengku Budriah	02600	Arau	6.4423°N 100.3100°E
REE0063	SMK Tengku Sulaiman	02400	Kangar	6.5181°N 100.2340°E
REA0084	SMK Tuanku Lailatul Shahreen	01000	Kangar	6.4371°N 100.2158°E

== Chinese Type Primary and Secondary School ==
=== Chinese Primary School ===
- SJK (C) CHIN HUN
- SJK (C) CHOON SIEW
- SJK (C) HWA AIK
- SJK (C) KHAY BENG
- SJK (C) KHOON AIK
- SJK (C) KONG AIK
- SJK (C) KONG HWA
- SJK (C) PADANG BESAR (U)
- SJK (C) SIMPANG AMPAT
- SJK (C) SIN MIN

=== SMJK School ===
- SEKOLAH MENENGAH JENIS KEBANGSAAN PERLIS

== Technical school Sekolah Menengah Teknik (SMT) ==
- Sekolah Menengah Teknik Arau ???- Sekolah Vokasional Arau
- Sekolah Menengah Teknik Kangar ???- Sekolah Vokasional Kangar

== Boarding School ==
- Harvest Academy (International)
- Maktab Rendah Sains MARA Beseri
- Sekolah Menengah Sains Tuanku Syed Putra
- Maktab Rendah Sains MARA Arau

== See also ==
- Education in Malaysia
