= Abdul Majeed Abdul Bari =

Maldivian politician (1963–2018)

- ޢަބްދުލްމަޖީދު ޢަބްދުލްބާރީ
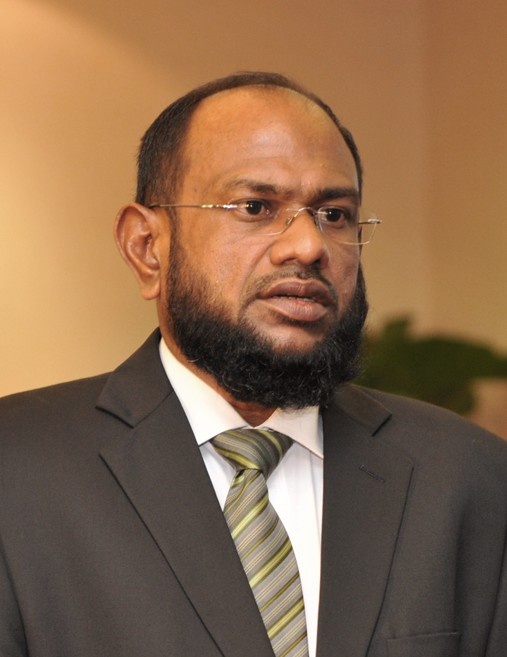
- Bari in 2011

Minister of Islamic Affairs
- In office 12 November 2008 – 7 February 2012
- President: Mohamed Nasheed
- Succeeded by: Mohamed Shaheem

Personal details
- Born: 1963
- Died: 22 May 2018 Colombo, Sri lanka
- Party: Adhaalath Party (2005–2013; 2015–2018)
- Other political affiliations: Maldivian Democratic Party (2013–2015)
- Children: 5
- Education: Islamic University of Madinah

Abdul Majeed Abdul Bari (Dhivehi: ޢަބްދުލްމަޖީދު ޢަބްދުލްބާރީ; 1963–22 May 2018) was a Maldivian politician and Islamic scholar who served as the first Minister of Islamic Affairs of the Maldives from 2008 to 2012. Abdul Majeed died on 22 May 2018, in Colombo, Sri Lanka at the age of 55.

== Education ==
Bari received his first education at the Hulhudhoo Madrasah and later on at Feydhoo School in Seenu Atoll. After that, he went to Malé and attended English Preparatory and Secondary School (EPSS). In 1979, he went to Jamia Salafia and Jamia Taleemat in Pakistan for further education.

In 1982, he joined the Islamic University of Madinah, where he studied from secondary education to his PhD.

Bari attained his bachelor's degree in 1997 in Fundamentals of Religion (Usul-ud-Din) from the university. In his bachelor's degree, he wrote a dissertation on the topic of [Conversion of Maldives to Islam]. After that, he got the opportunity to pursue a master's degree at the university. He did his Masters in Tafsir [Interpretation of Quran] in 1993. He received his PhD in 1997. He was the first Maldivian to earn a Doctor of Philosophy in Quran Tafseer.

== Career ==
=== Early career ===
Bari served as the first president of the Centre for Quran Studies and the first chief of the state-run Fiqh Committee. He was also a senior lecturer at the Maldives National University, joining in 2012.

=== Political career ===
As a member of the Adhaalath Party (AP), Bari served as the first Minister of Islamic Affairs during the presidency of Mohamed Nasheed. He was reappointed as the Islamic Affairs Minister in July 2010 after the en masse resignation of Nasheed's cabinet. In October 2011, Bari resigned as Minister of Islamic Affairs following his party's decision to break its coalition with the Maldivian Democratic Party (MDP) government. He was later reappointed by Nasheed as the same post a week later. Although opposition MPs in the People's Majlis (parliament) were to vote against his reappointment, he was endorsed by the parliament in a narrow vote.

In 2013, Bari left the AP and joined the MDP. In 2015, he reversed his decision and rejoined the AP.

In 2016, Bari was briefly detained at Bandaranaike International Airport for carrying large sums of money.

== Death ==
On 19 May 2018, Bari family revealed that he had suffered a stroke in Sri Lanka and was under a medically induced coma. He underwent three surgeries and was put on ventilator support after. On 22 May, he died.

Former presidents Mohamed Nasheed and Abdulla Yameen called Bari a notable reformist and offered condolences to his family.

He was buried at the Muslim cemetery in Colombo the next day. A book of condolences was opened by the Maldives National University for Abdul Majeed. An absentee funeral prayer was held at the Islamic Centre the next day as well.

== Awards ==
In 2019, President Ibrahim Mohamed Solih posthumously conferred the National Award of Honour to Bari for his contributions towards Islamic awareness and Islamic education in the Maldives.
