= Ahmed Ziyad Baqir =

Maldivian politician (born 1975)

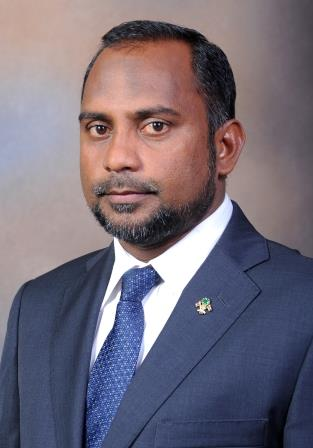
- Portrait, 2015

Minister of Islamic Affairs
- In office 6 May 2015 – 17 November 2018
- President: Abdulla Yameen
- Preceded by: Mohamed Shaheem Ali Saeed
- Succeeded by: Ahmed Zahir Ali

Personal details
- Born: 4 November 1975 (age 50) Eydhafushi, Baa Atoll, Maldives
- Education: University of Science and Technology; University of Yemen; University of Malaya

Ahmed Ziyad Baqir (Dhivehi: އަޙްމަދު ޒިޔާދު ބާޤިރު; born 4 November 1975), is a Maldivian politician who served as Minister of Islamic Affairs of the Maldives from 2015 to 2018.

== Education ==
Baqir obtained his bachelor's degree at the University of Science and Technology. He then obtained his master's degree in Islamic Studies from the University of Yemen and his Doctor of Philosophy in Islamic law at the University of Malaya, Malaysia. He did his O‑Level at Arabiyya School, Maldives.

== Career ==
In Baqir's early career, he served as the Dean of Shariah and Law at the Maldives College of Islamic Studies, Senior Lecturer at the Faculty of Shariah and Law at the Maldives National University, Member of the Islamic Fiqh Academy of Maldives, Lecturer at Villa College, and Islamic Consultant for Television Maldives and Radio Maldives. Ziyad also served as the principal of Arabiyya School, Maldives.

Baqir was appointed as Minister of Islamic Affairs by the president, Abdulla Yameen, on 6 May 2015 following the resignation of former Islamic Minister Mohamed Shaheem.

=== Charges ===
In 2020, The Prosecutor General's Office (PGO) charged Baqir with misuse of official authority in relation with the Yameen administration's agreement with SJ Construction to develop Zikra Mosque that benefited him. Then opposition parties Progressive Party of Maldives and the People's National Congress called the alleged corruption charges baseless. The High Court ruled that the charged against Baqir weren't proven without a reasonable doubt. The PGO appealed but later withdrew it.
