= Faizul Amri Adnan =

Malaysian politician

Ir. Dr. Faizul Amri Adnan
- فائزالعماري عدنان

Member of the Johor State Legislative Assembly for Serom
- In office 28 June 2018 – 22 January 2022
- Preceded by: Abd Razak Minhat
- Succeeded by: Khairin Nisa

Personal details
- Born: Faizul Amri bin Adnan; 22 January 1973 (age 53) Kuala Lumpur
- Citizenship: Malaysian
- Party: AMANAH (till 22 June 2020); PKR (since 27 February 2021)
- Other political affiliations: Pakatan Harapan
- Occupation: Politician

Faizul Amri bin Adnan (born 22 January 1973) is a Malaysian politician from PKR. He was the Member of Johor State Legislative Assembly for Serom from 2018 to 2022.

== Politics ==
On 22 June 2020, he tendered his resignation as Amanah’s state committee member and its education committee chairman and stated that he was not interested in defending his Serom seat. On 27 February 2021, he joined PKR and expressed his intention to contest for a parliamentary seat.

== Election results ==
Johor State Legislative Assembly
Year	Constituency	Candidate	Votes	Pct.	Opponent(s)	Votes	Pct.	Ballots cast	Majority	Turnout
2018	N11 Serom	Faizul Amri Adnan (AMANAH)	11,774	48.28%	Abdull Rahim Talib (UMNO)	9,450	38.75%	24,389	2,324	84.93%
2018	N11 Serom	Faizul Amri Adnan (AMANAH)	11,774	48.28%	Mustaffa Salleh (PAS)	2,708	11.10%	24,389	2,324	84.93%
