= Jengka (state constituency) =

Political subdivision in Malaysia

Pahang constituency

State constituency
- Legislature: Pahang State Legislative Assembly
MLA
Shahril Azman Abd Halim
PN
- Constituency created: 1974
- First contested: 1974
- Last contested: 2022

Demographics
- Population (2020): 40,252
- Electors (2022): 31,359

Jengka is a state constituency in Pahang, Malaysia, that is represented in the Pahang State Legislative Assembly.

== Demographics ==
Ethnic breakdown of Jengka's electorate as of 2022
1. Malay (98.2%)
2. Indian (1.12%)
3. Other ethnicities (0.50%)
4. Chinese (0.14%)

== History ==
=== Polling districts ===
According to the federal gazette issued on 31 October 2022, the Jengka constituency is divided into 10 polling districts.

State constituency	Polling Districts	Code	Location
Jengka (N29)	FELDA Jengka 11	087/29/01	SK LKTP Jengka 11
Jengka (N29)	Bandar Pusat	087/29/02	SK Bandar Pusat Jengka; SMK Jengka Pusat
Jengka (N29)	FELDA Jengka 14	087/29/03	SK LKTP Jengka 14
Jengka (N29)	FELDA Jengka 21	087/29/04	SK LKTP Jengka 21
Jengka (N29)	FELDA Jengka 15	087/29/05	SK LKTP Jengka 15
Jengka (N29)	FELDA Jengka 16	087/29/06	SK LKTP Jengka 16
Jengka (N29)	FELDA Jengka 20	087/29/07	SK LKTP Jengka 20
Jengka (N29)	FELDA Jengka 17	087/29/08	SK LKTP Jengka 17
Jengka (N29)	FELDA Jengka 18	087/29/09	SK LKTP Jengka 18
Jengka (N29)	FELDA Jengka 19	087/29/10	SK LKTP Jengka 19

=== Representation history ===
Members of the Legislative Assembly for Jengka
Assembly	No	Years	Name	Party
Constituency created from Chenor
4th	N19	1974-1978	Sariah Kamiso	BN (UMNO)
5th	N19	1978-1982	Sariah Kamiso	BN (UMNO)
6th	N19	1982-1986	Zainal Hassan	BN (UMNO)
7th	N20	1986-1990	Zainal Hassan	BN (UMNO)
8th	N20	1990-1995	Zainal Hassan	BN (UMNO)
9th	N23	1995-1999	Zainal Hassan	BN (UMNO)
10th	N23	1999-2004	Tuan Ibrahim Tuan Man	PAS
11th	N29	2004-2008	Abdul Rahman Ibrahim	BN (UMNO)
12th	N29	2008-2013	Wan Salman Wan Ismail	BN (UMNO)
13th	N29	2013-2018	Wan Salman Wan Ismail	BN (UMNO)
14th	N29	2018-2020	Shahril Azman Abd Halim	PAS
14th	N29	2020-2022	Shahril Azman Abd Halim	PN (PAS)
15th	N29	2022–present	Shahril Azman Abd Halim	PN (PAS)

== Election results ==
Pahang state election, 2022
Party	Candidate	Votes	%	∆%
PN	Shahril Azman Abd Halim	15,309	61.14	▲61.14
BN	Norhasmimi Abdul Ghani	8,405	33.57	
PH	Jamaluddin Abd Rahim	1,111	4.43	▲4.43
Total valid votes		25,038	100.00	
Total rejected ballots		213		
Unreturned ballots		73		
Turnout		25,397	80.99	
Registered electors		31,359		
Majority		6,904	27.57	
PN hold		Swing		
