= Khairin Nisa =

Malaysian politician and lawyer (born 1965)

Khairin-Nisa Ismail
- خيرالنساء إسماعيل

Member of the Johor State Executive Council (Women, Family and Community Development)
- In office 26 March 2022 – 11 July 2026
- Monarch: Ibrahim Iskandar
- Menteri Besar: Onn Hafiz Ghazi
- Preceded by: Zaiton Ismail
- Succeeded by: Hasrunizah Hassan
- Constituency: Serom

Member of the Johor State Legislative Assembly for Serom
- In office 12 March 2022 – 11 July 2026
- Preceded by: Faizul Amri Adnan (PH–AMANAH)
- Succeeded by: Nadhirah Afiqah Abdul Rahim (BN–UMNO)
- Majority: 699 (2022)

Personal details
- Born: Khairin-Nisa binti Ismail @ Md On; 2 October 1965 (age 61)
- Citizenship: Malaysia
- Party: United Malays National Organisation (UMNO)
- Other political affiliations: Barisan Nasional (BN)
- Children: 1
- Education: International Islamic University Malaysia (LLB)
- Occupation: Politician
- Profession: Lawyer

Khairin-Nisa binti Ismail @ Md On (born 2 October 1964) is a Malaysian politician and lawyer who has served as a Member of the Johor State Executive Council (EXCO) in the Barisan Nasional (BN) state administration under Menteri Besar Onn Hafiz Ghazi and Member of the Johor State Legislative Assembly (MLA) for Serom since March 2022. She is a member and the Division Women Chief of Ledang of the United Malays National Organisation (UMNO), a component party of the BN coalition. She is also presently the sole female Johor EXCO Member after the removal from office of former Johor EXCO Member Norlizah Noh in February 2024.

== Career ==
Before entering politics, she graduated from International Islamic University Malaysia (IIUM) and opened a law firm named after her, Khairin-Nisa & Co., in Muar, Johor on 23 May 1990.

In the 2022 Johor state election, she contested Serom seat under the Barisan Nasional (BN) banner and defeated 3 other candidates — Rahmat Daud from Perikatan Nasional (PN), Asim Abdullah from Pakatan Harapan (PH), and Azim Malek from the Homeland Fighter's Party (PEJUANG).

== Election results ==
Johor State Legislative Assembly
Year	Constituency		Votes	Pct	Opponent(s)	Votes	Pct	Ballots cast	Majority	Turnout
2022	N11 Serom	Khairin Nisa (UMNO)	8,507	38.40%	Rahmat Daud (PAS)	7,808	35.24%	22,156	699	58.05%
2022	N11 Serom	Khairin Nisa (UMNO)	8,507	38.40%	Asim Abdullah (AMANAH)	5,509	24.87%	22,156	699	58.05%
2022	N11 Serom	Khairin Nisa (UMNO)	8,507	38.40%	Abdul Azim Abdul Malek (PEJUANG)	332	1.50%	22,156	699	58.05%

== See also ==
- List of International Islamic University Malaysia alumni
