= Norhasmimi Abdul Ghani =

Malaysian politician (born 1975)

Yang Berhormat Senator Puan Norhasmimi Abdul Ghani
- نورهسميمي عبدالغني

Senator Elected by the Pahang State Legislative Assembly
- Incumbent
- Assumed office 13 May 2025 Serving with Shahrol Wizan Sulong
- Monarch: Ibrahim
- Prime Minister: Anwar Ibrahim
- Preceded by: Juhanis Abd Aziz

Women Chief of the United Malays National Organisation of Pahang
- Incumbent
- Assumed office 31 March 2023
- President: Ahmad Zahid Hamidi
- National Women Chief: Noraini Ahmad
- Vice Women Chief: Rosni Zahari
- Preceded by: Siti Hajar Mubin

Personal details
- Born: 27 May 1975 (age 51) Jengka, Temerloh, Pahang
- Citizenship: Malaysia
- Party: United Malays National Organisation (UMNO)
- Other political affiliations: Barisan Nasional
- Spouse: Khairul Amin Osman
- Education: International Islamic University Malaysia (LLB)
- Occupation: Politician
- Profession: Lawyer

Norhasmimi Abdul Ghani is a Malaysian politician who has served as a Senator since May 2025. She is a member, the Women Chief of Pahang and the Division Women Chief of Kuala Krau of the United Malays National Organisation (UMNO), a component party of the Barisan Nasional (BN) coalition.

== Election result ==
Pahang State Legislative Assembly
Year	Constituency	Candidate	Votes	Pct	Opponent(s)	Votes	Pct	Ballots cast	Majority	Turnout
2022	N29 Jengka	Norhasmimi Abdul Ghani (UMNO)	8,405	33.57%	Shahril Azman Abd Halim (PAS)	15,309	61.14%	25,397	6,904	80.99%
2022	N29 Jengka	Norhasmimi Abdul Ghani (UMNO)	8,405	33.57%	Jamaluddin Abd Rahim (PKR)	1,111	4.43%	25,397	6,904	80.99%

== See also ==
- Members of the Dewan Negara, 15th Malaysian Parliament
- List of International Islamic University Malaysia alumni
