= Ahmed Zahir Ali =

Maldivian politician

Minister of Islamic Affairs
- In office 17 November 2018 – 17 November 2023
- President: Ibrahim Mohamed Solih
- Preceded by: Ahmed Ziyad Baqir
- Succeeded by: Mohamed Shaheem Ali Saeed

Personal details
- Party: Adhaalath Party
- Education: Jamia Darussalam; Islamic University of Madinah; International Islamic University Malaysia

Ahmed Zahir Ali (Dhivehi: އަޙްމަދު ޒާހިރު ޢަލީ) is a Maldivian politician who served as Minister of Islamic Affairs of the Maldives from 2018 to 2023. He was a director of the Ministry of Islamic Affairs when he was appointed as a minister.

Ahmed Zahir Ali obtained his bachelor's degree in 1997 in Fundamentals of Religion (Usul-ud-Din) from the Islamic University of Madinah. He then obtained his master's degree in Islamic Revealed Knowledge and Human Sciences (Fiqh and Usul al-Fiqh) from the International Islamic University Malaysia and his Doctor of Philosophy in Political science from the same university. He also studied at Jamia Darussalam in Oomerabad, India.
