= Ministry of Islamic Affairs and Endowments =

Government ministry of the Maldives

- އިސްލާމީކަންތައްތަކާއި އައުޤާފާ ބެހޭ ވުޒާރާ Islaamee Kanthahthakaai Awqaafaa Behey Vuzaaraa

Agency overview
- Formed: 1996
- Jurisdiction: Government of the Maldives
- Headquarters: Ministry of Islamic Affairs, Medhuziyaaraiy Magu, Malé 20156, Maldives
- Annual budget: MVR 29.6 Million
- Ministers responsible: Mohamed Shaheem, Minister for Islamic Affairs and Endowments; Ilyaas Jamaal, Minister of State for Islamic Affairs
- Deputy Ministers responsible: Ibrahim Asim, Deputy Minister of State for Islamic Affairs and Endowments; Hussain Shareef, Deputy Minister of State for Islamic Affairs and Endowments
- Agency executives: Ashaailhaa Thalsoom Ahmed, Director; Aminath Naseer, Director General; Abdul Azeez Ismail, Deputy Director General; Ahmed Adheel, Permanent Secretary; Ibrahim Shafeeg Hassan, Senior Executive Director; Murushid Abdul Hakeem, Senior Executive Director; Ali Rishaa, Senior Executive Director; Ahmed Shiaau, Executive Director; Assadhu Adam, Executive Director
- Website: islamicaffairs.gov.mv

The Ministry of Islamic Affairs and Endowments (Dhivehi: އިސްލާމީކަންތައްތަކާއި އައުޤާފާ ބެހޭ ވުޒާރާ) formerly known as Ministry of Islamic Affairs is a government agency of the Republic of Maldives, handling the country's religious affairs. It was previously known as Supreme Council for Islamic Affairs, and was constituted by the president of Maldives, Maumoon Abdul Gayoom in 1996. The institution was renamed in November 2008, by the president of the Maldives, Mohamed Nasheed. The Ministry of Islamic Affairs' mandate is established by the Constitution of Maldives.

== Responsibilities ==
- Advising the government of Maldives on religious matters
- Governing the religious views of the general population
- Maintaining and publishing Hidhaayathuge Ali'
- Duties under Preservation of Religious Unity law 94/6
- Overseeing issues related to Friday prayer
- Inspecting and approving religious texts
- Maintenance of mosques in Maldives
- Setting the Islamic calendar to be followed by Maldivians
- Prohibition of religious preaching except Islamic
- Management of Zakāt and related aspects, management of funds
- Overseeing Hajj related matters
- Maintaining the Islamic Library in Islamic Centre
- Maintaining the prayer times followed in Maldives
- Advising and assisting in various educational institutions in religious matters
- Maintaining the Centre for Qur'anic Studies
- Other religion-related matters

== Ministers ==
No.	Portrait	Name (born-died)	Term			Political party	Government	Ref.
No.	Portrait	Name (born-died)	Took office	Left office	Time in office	Political party	Government	Ref.
Supreme Council for Islamic Affairs
1	Moosa Fathuhy	Moosa Fathuhy	Unknown	Unknown	Unknown	?	Unknown	
2	Mohamed Rasheed Ibrahim	Mohamed Rasheed Ibrahim	Unknown	Unknown	Unknown	?	Unknown	
Ministry of Islamic Affairs
3	Abdul Majeed Abdul Bari	Abdul Majeed Abdul Bari (1963–2018)	12 November 2008	7 February 2012	4 years, 25 days	AP	Nasheed	
4	Mohamed Shaheem	Mohamed Shaheem (born 1977)	19 February 2012	06 May 2015	3 years, 76 days	AP	Waheed; Yameen	
5	Ahmed Ziyad Baqir	Ahmed Ziyad Baqir (born 1975)	06 May 2015	17 November 2018	3 years, 195 days	PPM	Yameen	
6	Ahmed Zahir Ali	Ahmed Zahir Ali	17 November 2018	17 November 2023	5 years, 0 days	AP	Solih	
7	Mohamed Shaheem	Mohamed Shaheem (born 1977)	17 November 2023	14 April 2026	2 years, 148 days	PNC	Muizzu	
Ministry of Islamic Affairs and Endowments
8	Mohamed Shaheem	Mohamed Shaheem (born 1977)	14 April 2026	Incumbent	9 days	PNC	Muizzu	

== See also ==
- Freedom of religion in Maldives
