= Islamic Centre (Maldives) =

Architectural landmark in Malé, Maldives

Islamic Centre Masjid as-Sultan Muhammad Thakurufaanu al-Auzam
- Dhivehi: މަސްޖިދުއް ސުލްޠާން މުޙައްމަދު ތަކުރުފާނު އަލްއަޢުޡަމް
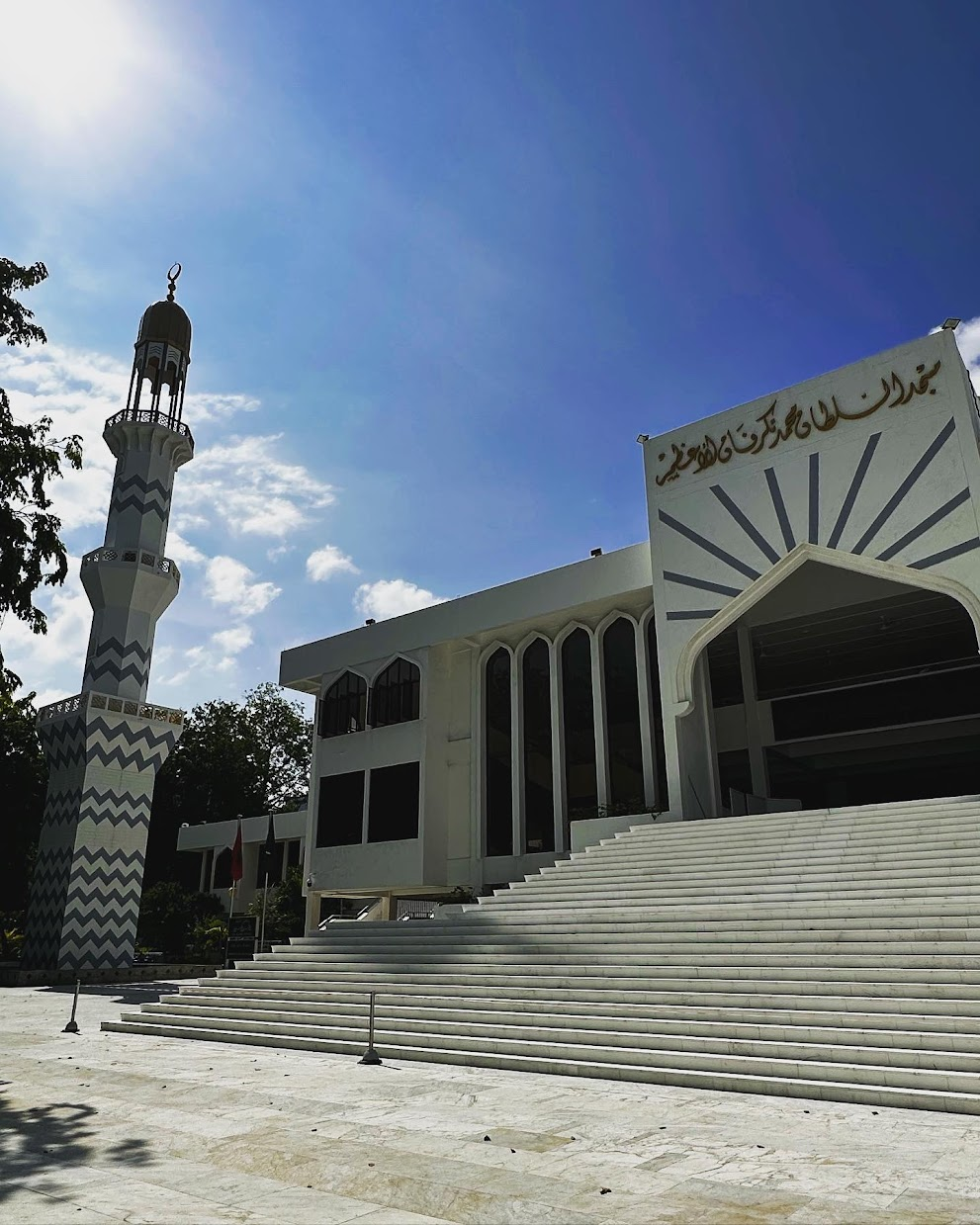

- Location of the mosque in the Maldives

Religion
- Affiliation: Sunni Islam
- Ecclesiastical or organizational status: Mosque
- Status: Active

Location
- Location: Malé, Kaafu Atoll
- Country: Maldives
- Interactive map of Islamic Centre; Masjid as-Sultan Muhammad Thakurufaanu al-Auzam
- Administration: Ministry of Islamic Affairs
- Coordinates: 04°10′41″N 73°30′45″E

Architecture
- Type: Mosque architecture
- Style: Modernist (Malaysia)
- Completed: 1984

Specifications
- Capacity: 5,000 worshippers
- Minaret: One
- Minaret height: 41 m (133 ft)

The Islamic Centre, officially named the Masjid as-Sultan Muhammad Thakurufaanu al-Auzam (Dhivehi: މަސްޖިދުއް ސުލްޠާން މުޙައްމަދު ތަކުރުފާނު އަލްއަޢުޡަމް; Arabic: مسجد السلطان محمد تكرفان الأعظم), is a Sunni Islam mosque, located in Malé, on the Kaafu Atoll, in the Maldives. The mosque was opened by President Maumoon Abdul Gayoom in November 1984.

== History ==
The Islamic Centre was built with the assistance of Islamic countries who provided financial support during the 1980s, including Saudi Arabia, Brunei, Pakistan, Malaysia, and the United Arab Emirates. President Maumoon Abdul Gayoom put the cornerstone on the building on 11 November 1982, and on 11 November 1984 it was officially opened. A plate in the grand entrance of the centre is engraved in Dhivehi, Arabic and English with the names of all leaders of the Islamic countries who provided support. The plate also records that the Islamic Centre was opened on AH 10 Safar 1405, or 11 November 1984 CE.

The building is an impressive structure, with a large golden dome and a minaret that stands 41 m (133 ft) tall. The building was based on the Modernist design of a mosque that was built in Malaysia and still present there, and it was constructed using traditional Islamic architectural elements.

The Grand Friday Mosque, located in the Islamic Centre, is named after one of the most celebrated Maldivian heroes, Sultan Muhammad Thakurufaanu al-Auzam of the Maldives. The mosque has capacity for approximately 5,000 worshippers.

The centre also serves as a conference hall for official meetings and ceremonies, an Islamic library, and a number of offices, and houses the Ministry of Islamic Affairs since 11 November 2008, that replaced the Supreme Council of Islamic Affairs, established by Maumoon Abdul Gayoom, a former president of the Maldives.

== Architecture ==
The Islamic Centre acts as a major tourist attraction in Malé, in part due to its location near the main jetty of Malé and the mosque's architecture. The mosque's golden dome is evident on the skyline of Malé and is highly visible. The mosque's interior walls are decorated with woodcarvings and Arabic calligraphy. The centre's Grand Friday Mosque, Masjid as-Sultan Muhammad Thakurufaanu al-Auzam, was the largest mosque in the Maldives, until the opening of the King Salman Mosque in 2022, that accommodates 10,000 worshippers.

== See also ==
- Islam in the Maldives
- List of mosques in the Maldives
- History of Maldives
- Culture of Maldives
