= Mohamed Shaheem =

Maldivian government official (born 1977)

Mohamed Shaheem Ali Saeed
- މުޙައްމަދު ޝަހީމް ޢަލީ ސަޢީދު
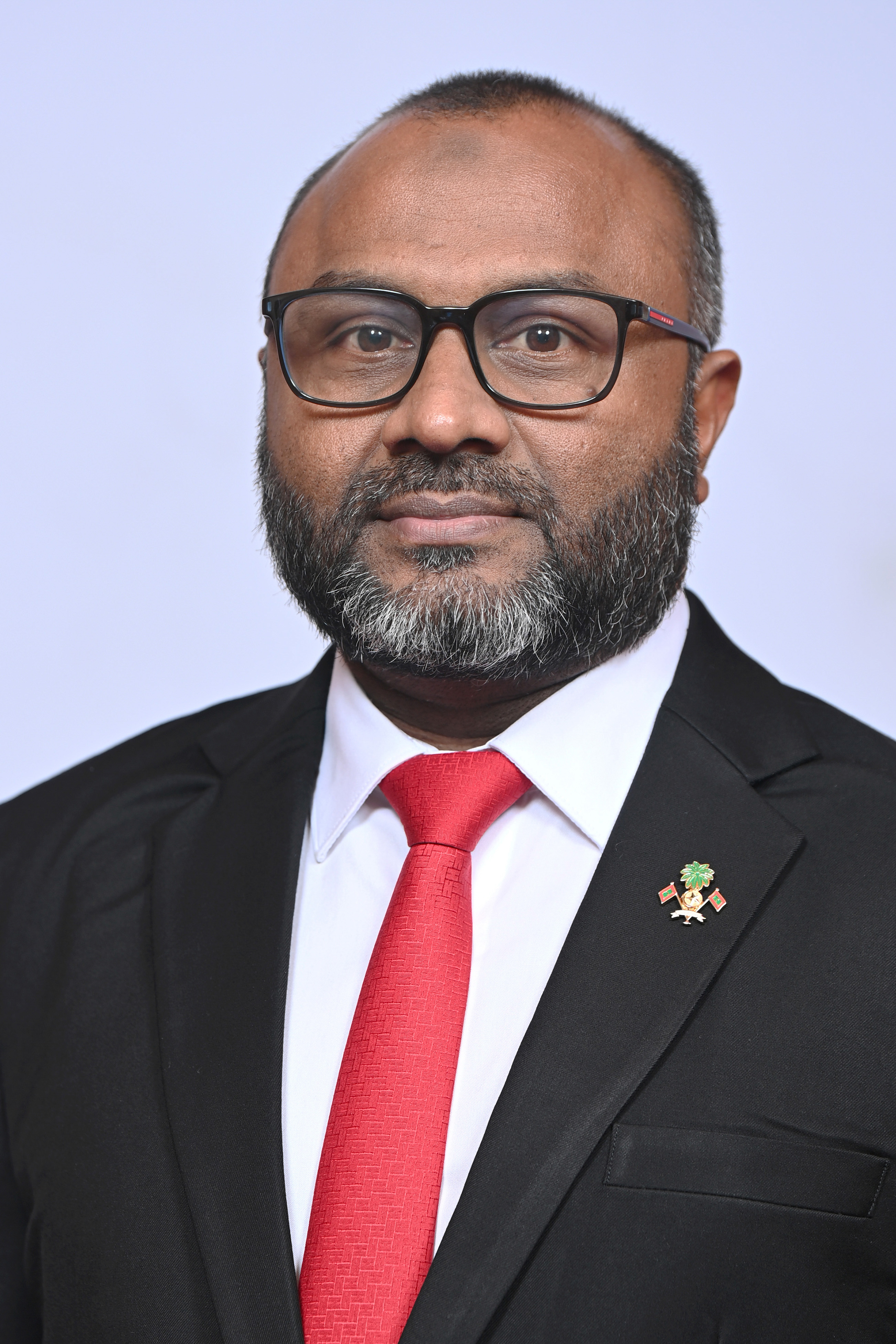
- Official portrait, 2026

Minister of Islamic Affairs and Endownments
- Incumbent
- Assumed office 14 April 2026
- President: Mohamed Muizzu
- Preceded by: Himself

Minister of Islamic Affairs
- In office 17 November 2023 – 14 April 2026
- President: Mohamed Muizzu
- Preceded by: Ahmed Zahir Ali
- Succeeded by: Himself
- In office 19 February 2012 – 6 May 2015
- President: Mohamed Waheed Hassan; Abdulla Yameen
- Preceded by: Abdul Majeed Abdul Bari
- Succeeded by: Ahmed Ziyad Baqir

Chancellor of the Islamic University of Maldives
- In office 22 August 2016 – 2018
- President: Abdulla Yameen
- Preceded by: Mohamed Zahir Hussain
- Succeeded by: Mohamed Zahir Hussain

Personal details
- Born: 28 March 1977 (age 49) Maamendhoo, Gaafu Alifu Atoll, Maldives
- Party: People's National Congress (2026–present)
- Other political affiliations: Adhaalath Party (2005–2015; 2025–2026); Progressive Party of Maldives (2018–2025)
- Education: Islamic University of Madinah; International Islamic University Malaysia
- Website: drshaheem.com

Mohamed Shaheem Ali Saeed (Dhivehi: މުޙައްމަދު ޝަހީމް ޢަލީ ސަޢީދު; born 28 March 1977), is a Maldivian politician who is currently serving as the Minister of Islamic Affairs and Endownments since 2026.

== Early life and education ==
Shaheem memorized the Holy Quran at Jamia Ashrafia in Lahore, Pakistan, and obtained a diploma in Arabic and Islamic education from Imam Abu Hanifa Higher Institute for Teachers. He then studied Arabic further in Egypt. Shaheem attained his bachelor's degree in Islamic jurisprudence and its principles from the Islamic University of Madinah. He then obtained his master's degree in Islamic Revealed Knowledge and Human Sciences (Fiqh and Usul al-Fiqh) from the International Islamic University Malaysia and his Doctor of Philosophy in Islamic Revealed Knowledge and Human Sciences (Fiqh and Usul al-Fiqh) from the same university.

== Career ==
Shaheem was one of the senior founding members of the Adhaalath Party (AP).

He has held positions as Assistant Supervisor of the National Centre for the Holy Quran, Founding Dean of the Faculty of Sharia at Villa College, Minister of State for Islamic Affairs, Minister of Islamic Affairs, Governor and Deputy Governor appointed to Maldives by the Islamic Development Bank (IDB), Chancellor and Vice-Chancellor of the Islamic University of Maldives, member of the Higher Education Council of Maldives, advisor to the Secretary General of the Organisation of Islamic Cooperation (OIC) and in charge of the OIC Voice of Wisdom Centre. He has also served as a member of various international educational and Islamic institutions, the Islamic Fiqh Academy of Maldives and the Sharia Board of the Maldives Monetary Authority.

He was the Minister of Islamic Affairs from 19 February 2012 until his resignation on 5 May 2015 under President Mohamed Waheed Hassan and Abdulla Yameen.

Shaheem later left AP in 2015 during the party's exit from the ruling coalition at the time and was the reason why he resigned as Islamic Minister.

He was also the unsuccessful running mate of President Abdulla Yameen in the 2018 Maldivian presidential election.

He was then appointed Chancellor of Islamic University of Maldives. In 2020, he became a political advisor to the opposition Progressive Party of Maldives.

He was later appointed by President Mohamed Muizzu as the Minister of Islamic Affairs, but when the Parliament decided to vote to approve of Shaheem, majority of the MPs voted no and President Muizzu reappointed him.

In 2025, Shaheem later rejoined the AP.

In April 2026, President Muizzu appointed Saeed as the Minister of Islamic Affairs and Endownments.

In 2026, Shaheem joined the People's National Congress and left the AP.

== Awards ==
Shaheem was presented the Tokoh Alumni Award by the International Islamic University Malaysia (IIUM). The award is the highest award given by the university in recognition of outstanding national and international service and leadership efforts among its alumni. He also received the Alumni Leadership Award from the Islamic University of Madinah.
