= Serom =

State constituency in Johor, Malaysia

Serom (N11)
Johor constituency

State constituency
- Legislature: Johor State Legislative Assembly
MLA
Nadhirah Afiqah Abdul Rahim
BN
- Constituency created: 1959
- First contested: 1959
- Last contested: 2026

Demographics
- Population (2020): 52,099
- Electors (2026): 40,172
- Area (km²): 196

Serom is a state constituency in Johor, Malaysia, that is represented in the Johor State Legislative Assembly.

The state constituency was first contested in 1959 and is mandated to return a single Assemblyman to the Johor State Legislative Assembly under the first-past-the-post voting system.

== Demographics ==
As of 2020, Serom has a population of 52,099 people.

Ethnic breakdown of Serom's electorate as of 2026
1. Malay (67.4%)
2. Chinese (30.9%)
3. Indian (0.90%)
4. Other ethnicities (0.70%)

== History ==
=== Polling districts ===
According to the gazette issued on 2 July 2026, the Serom constituency has a total of 21 polling districts.

State constituency	Polling districts	Code	Location
Serom (N11)	Blemang	144/11/01	SK Belemang
Serom (N11)	Paya Kepong	144/11/02	Balai Raya Paya Kepong
Serom (N11)	Telok Rimba	144/11/03	SK Telok Rimba
Serom (N11)	Pekan Bukit Kangkar	144/11/04	SJK (C) Nan Hwa
Serom (N11)	Bukit Kangkar	144/11/05	SK Bukit Kangkar
Serom (N11)	Serom Darat	144/11/06	SK Serom 3
Serom (N11)	Serom Lima	144/11/07	SK Serom 5
Serom (N11)	Serom Lapan	144/11/08	SA Serom 8
Serom (N11)	Serom Baroh	144/11/09	SA Serom 3
Serom (N11)	Bandar Serom	144/11/10	SJK (C) Chung Hwa
Serom (N11)	Sungai Mati	144/11/11	SMK Tengku Mahmud Iskandar
Serom (N11)	Kesang Tasek	144/11/12	SK Kesang Tasek
Serom (N11)	Bandar Sungai Mati	144/11/13	SK Abdullah
Serom (N11)	Rawang	144/11/14	SK Rawang
Serom (N11)	Kampong Pantai Layang	144/11/15	SK Pantai Layang
Serom (N11)	Parit Bunga	144/11/16	SK Parit Bunga
Serom (N11)	Kesang	144/11/17	SK Kesang
Serom (N11)	Parit Pajar	144/11/18	SK Tanjong Gading
Serom (N11)	Tanjong Ganding	144/11/19	SMK Parit Bunga
Serom (N11)	Tanjong Agas Utara	144/11/20	SA Tun Syed Nasir
Serom (N11)	Tanjong Agas Selatan	144/11/21	SMK Persisiran Perdana

=== Representation history ===
Members of the Legislative Assembly for Serom
Assembly	No	Years	Member	Party
Constituency created
1st	N32	1959-1964	Abdul Latiff Omar	Alliance (UMNO)
2nd	N32	1964-1969	Ngah Abdul Rahman	Alliance (UMNO)
		1969-1971	Assembly dissolved	
3rd	N32	1971–1973	Ngah Abdul Rahman	Alliance (UMNO)
3rd	N32	1973-1974	Ngah Abdul Rahman	BN (UMNO)
4th	N10	1974-1978	Ngah Abdul Rahman	BN (UMNO)
5th	N10	1978-1982	Ngah Abdul Rahman	BN (UMNO)
6th	N10	1982-1986	Mohd Nor Mohd Dom	BN (UMNO)
7th	N04	1986-1990	Mohd Nor Mohd Dom	BN (UMNO)
8th	N04	1990-1995	Hashim Ismail	BN (UMNO)
9th	N04	1995-1999	Abdul Ghani Othman	BN (UMNO)
10th	N04	1999-2004	Abdul Ghani Othman	BN (UMNO)
11th	N11	2004-2008	Abdul Ghani Othman	BN (UMNO)
12th	N11	2008-2013	Abdul Ghani Othman	BN (UMNO)
13th	N11	2013-2018	Abd Razak Minhat	BN (UMNO)
14th	N11	2018-2021	Faizul Amri Adnan	PH (AMANAH)
14th	N11	2021-2022	Faizul Amri Adnan	PH (PKR)
15th	N11	2022–2026	Khairin Nisa Ismail	BN (UMNO)
16th	N11	2026-present	Nadhirah Afiqah Abdul Rahim	BN (UMNO)

== Election results ==
Johor state election, 2026: Serom
Party	Candidate	Votes	%	∆%
BN	Nadhirah Afiqah Abdull Rahim	17,213	60.03	▲21.64
PH	Ahmad Naazri Abd Hamid	7,807	27.22	▲2.35
PN	Mahfidz Omar	3,656	12.75	▼22.49
Total valid votes		28,676	100.00	
Total rejected ballots		251		
Unreturned ballots		32		
Turnout		28,959	72.09	▲14.03
Registered electors		40,172		
Majority		9,406	32.80	▲29.65
BN hold		Swing		?

Johor state election, 2022: Serom
Party	Candidate	Votes	%	∆%
BN	Khairin Nisa	8,507	38.40	▼1.09
PN	Rahmat Daud	7,808	35.24	▲35.24
PH	Asim Abdullah	5,509	24.87	▼24.33
PEJUANG	Abdul Azim Abdul Malek	332	1.50	▲1.50
Total valid votes		22,156	97.81	
Total rejected ballots		387	1.71	
Unreturned ballots		108	0.48	
Turnout		22,651	58.05	▼26.88
Registered electors		39,018		
Majority		699	3.16	▼6.55
BN gain from PKR		Swing		?
Source(s) "RESULTS OF CONTESTED ELECTION AND STATEMENTS OF THE POLL AFTER THE OFFICIAL ADDITION OF VOTES".

Johor state election, 2018: Serom
Party	Candidate	Votes	%	∆%
PKR	Faizul Amri Adnan	11,774	49.20	▲49.20
BN	Abdull Rahim Talib	9,450	39.49	▼15.91
PAS	Mustaffa Salleh	2,708	11.32	▼33.28
Total valid votes		23,932	98.13	
Total rejected ballots		359	1.47	
Unreturned ballots		98	0.40	
Turnout		24,389	84.93	▼1.87
Registered electors		28,394		
Majority		2,324	9.71	▼1.09
PKR gain from BN		Swing		?
Source(s) "RESULTS OF CONTESTED ELECTION AND STATEMENTS OF THE POLL AFTER THE OFFICIAL ADDITION OF VOTES".

Johor state election, 2013: Serom
Party	Candidate	Votes	%	∆%
BN	Abdul Razak Minhat	11,618	55.40	▼10.95
PAS	Azmi Ahmad	9,354	44.60	▲10.95
Total valid votes		20,972	98.51	
Total rejected ballots		305	1.43	
Unreturned ballots		13	0.06	
Turnout		21,290	86.80	▲10.95
Registered electors		24,540		
Majority		2,264	10.80	▼21.90
BN hold		Swing		?
Source(s) "KEPUTUSAN PILIHAN RAYA UMUM DEWAN UNDANGAN NEGERI".

Johor state election, 2008: Serom
Party	Candidate	Votes	%	∆%
BN	Abdul Ghani Othman	10,088	66.35	▼11.57
PAS	Rusman Kemin	5,117	33.65	▲11.57
Total valid votes		15,205	97.41	
Total rejected ballots		348	2.23	
Unreturned ballots		56	0.36	
Turnout		15,609	75.85	▲2.77
Registered electors		20,579		
Majority		4,971	32.70	▼23.14
BN hold		Swing		?
Source(s) "KEPUTUSAN PILIHAN RAYA UMUM DEWAN UNDANGAN NEGERI PERAK BAGI TAHUN 2008".

Johor state election, 2004: Serom
Party	Candidate	Votes	%	∆%
BN	Abdul Ghani Othman	11,276	77.92	▲8.33
PAS	Abu Bakar Tambi	3,195	22.08	▼8.33
Total valid votes		14,471	97.53	
Total rejected ballots		347	2.34	
Unreturned ballots		20	0.13	
Turnout		14,838	73.08	▲1.33
Registered electors		20,305		
Majority		8,081	55.84	▲16.66
BN hold		Swing		?
Source(s) "KEPUTUSAN PILIHAN RAYA UMUM DEWAN UNDANGAN NEGERI PERAK BAGI TAHUN 2004".

Johor state election, 1999: Serom
Party	Candidate	Votes	%	∆%
BN	Abdul Ghani Othman	14,652	69.59	▼14.01
PAS	Abdullah Husin	6,404	30.41	▲14.01
Total valid votes		21,056	96.45	
Total rejected ballots		760	3.48	
Unreturned ballots		14	0.06	
Turnout		21,830	71.75	▼0.04
Registered electors		30,425		
Majority		8,248	39.18	▼28.02
BN hold		Swing		?
Source(s) "KEPUTUSAN PILIHAN RAYA UMUM DEWAN UNDANGAN NEGERI PERAK BAGI TAHUN 1999".

Johor state election, 1995: Serom
Party	Candidate	Votes	%	∆%
BN	Abdul Ghani Othman	16,789	83.60	▲23.32
S46	Husni Mohd. Alip	3,293	16.40	▼23.32
Total valid votes		20,082	95.88	
Total rejected ballots		724	3.46	
Unreturned ballots		140	0.67	
Turnout		20,946	71.79	▼1.16
Registered electors		29,177		
Majority		13,496	67.20	▲46.64
BN hold		Swing		?
Source(s) "KEPUTUSAN PILIHAN RAYA UMUM DEWAN UNDANGAN NEGERI PERAK BAGI TAHUN 1995".

Johor state election, 1990: Serom
Party	Candidate	Votes	%	∆%
BN	Hashim Ismail	11,189	60.28	▼19.20
S46	Mohamed Nor Mohd. Rasif	7,374	39.72	▲39.72
Total valid votes		18,563	94.90	
Total rejected ballots		998	5.10	
Unreturned ballots		0	0.00	
Turnout		19,561	72.95	▲1.85
Registered electors		26,813		
Majority		3,815	20.56	▼38.40
BN hold		Swing		?
Source(s) "KEPUTUSAN PILIHAN RAYA UMUM DEWAN UNDANGAN NEGERI PERAK BAGI TAHUN 1990".

Johor state election, 1986: Serom
Party	Candidate	Votes	%	∆%
BN	Mohd. Noor Mohd. Dom	12,771	79.48	
PAS	Ungku Ismail Ungku Abdul Hamid	3,297	20.52	
Total valid votes		16,068	93.40	
Total rejected ballots		1,135	6.60	
Unreturned ballots		0	0.00	
Turnout		17,203	71.10	
Registered electors		24,195		
Majority		9,474	58.96	
BN hold		Swing		?
Source(s) "KEPUTUSAN PILIHAN RAYA UMUM DEWAN UNDANGAN NEGERI PERAK BAGI TAHUN 1986".

Johor state election, 1982: Serom
Party	Candidate	Votes	%	∆%
On the nomination day, Mohd. Noor Mohd. Dom won uncontested.
BN	Mohd. Noor Mohd. Dom			
Total valid votes				
Total rejected ballots				
Unreturned ballots				
Turnout				
Registered electors		16,344		
Majority				
BN hold		Swing		

Johor state election, 1978: Serom
Party	Candidate	Votes	%	∆%
BN	Ngah Abdul Rahman	8,430	77.06	
DAP	Lee Tiong King	2,283	20.87	
PAS	Abdul Rahman Abu	227	2.07	
Total valid votes		10,940	100.00	
Total rejected ballots		459		
Unreturned ballots		0		
Turnout		11,399	81.67	▲81.67
Registered electors		13,958		
Majority		6,147	56.19	▲56.19
BN hold		Swing		

Johor state election, 1974: Serom
Party	Candidate	Votes	%	∆%
On the nomination day, Ngah Abdul Rahman won uncontested.
BN	Ngah Abdul Rahman			
Total valid votes				
Total rejected ballots				
Unreturned ballots				
Turnout				
Registered electors		12,653		
Majority				
BN gain from Alliance		Swing		-

Johor state election, 1969: Serom
Party	Candidate	Votes	%	∆%
Alliance	Ngah Abdul Rahman	8,776	86.14	▲2.91
PMIP	Roso Jamilin	1,412	13.86	▲10.02
Total valid votes		10,188	100.00	
Total rejected ballots		682		
Unreturned ballots		0		
Turnout		10,870	75.94	▼7.75
Registered electors		14,314		
Majority		7,364	72.28	▲1.97
Alliance hold		Swing		

Johor state election, 1964: Serom
Party	Candidate	Votes	%	∆%
Alliance	Ngah Abdul Rahman	9,071	83.24	▲5.60
Socialist Front	Rapiah Hussien	1,409	12.93	▲12.93
PMIP	Mohamed Shah Musa	418	3.84	▼0.43
Total valid votes		10,898	100.00	
Total rejected ballots		655		
Unreturned ballots		0		
Turnout		11,553	83.69	▲0.17
Registered electors		13,804		
Majority		7,662	70.31	▲10.77
Alliance hold		Swing		

Johor state election, 1959: Serom
Party	Candidate	Votes	%
Alliance	Abdul Latiff Omar	7,280	77.64
National Party	Nasir Abdullah	1,697	18.10
PMIP	Abdul Razak Ibrahim	400	4.27
Total valid votes		9,377	100.00
Total rejected ballots		141	
Unreturned ballots		0	
Turnout		9,518	83.53
Registered electors		11,395	
Majority		5,583	59.54
This was a new constituency created.
