= Sikamat =

- Suburb of Seremban
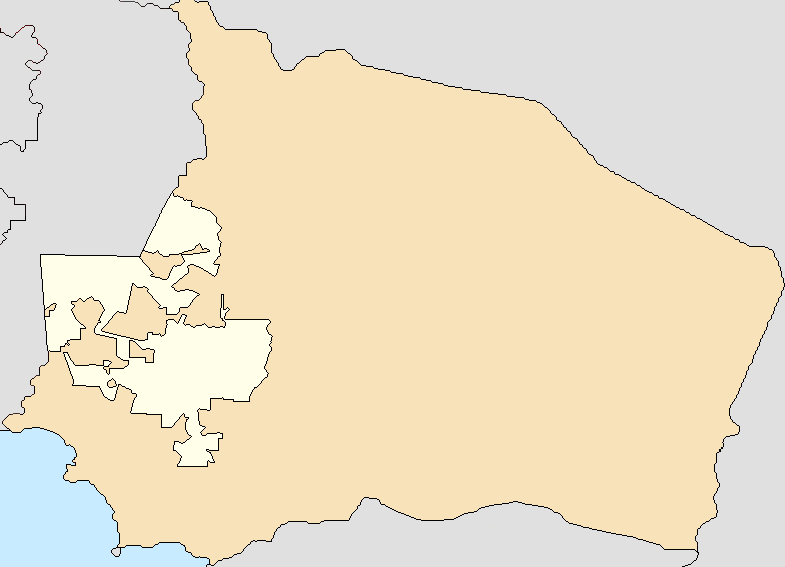
- Location within Seremban Location within Peninsular Malaysia
- Coordinates: 2°45′N 101°58′E
- Country: Malaysia
- State: Negeri Sembilan
- District: Seremban
- Luak: Sungai Ujong

Government
  - Body: Seremban City Council
  - Mayor: Masri Baharuddin
  - MP: Anthony Loke (PH–DAP)
  - MLA: Razali Abu Samah (PN–WAWASAN)
- Time zone: UTC+8 (MST)
- Postcode: 70400, 71770

Sikamat in Seremban District

Sikamat (Chinese: 小甘密; Jyutping: siu^{2}gam^{1}mat^{6}; pinyin: xiǎo gān mì) is a small town in Seremban District, Negeri Sembilan, Malaysia. The area contains many government schools and is one of the denser locations for them; SMK Tunku Ampuan Durah, SMK Dato' Sheikh Ahmad, SMK Haji Mohd Redza, SM Sains Tuanku Aishah Rohani (SGS), SM Sains Tuanku Munawir (SASER), SK Sikamat and the Institut Pendidikan Guru Kampus Raja Melewar, located beside the road towards Masjid Kariah Sikamat. The town is served by N38 which links Sikamat to Pantai and Seremban City Centre.
