= Mata Ayer =

Coordinates: 6.265°N 100.200°E

Mata Ayer is a suburb of Kangar and a small town in the middle part of Perlis, Malaysia. It is located on the way from Arau to Padang Besar. The name Mata Ayer is because almost the entire place has underground spring source. In Malay language spring means 'mata air' or old spelling as "mata ayer". The villagers in Mata Ayer exploit this advantage by digging wells for water in addition to the tap water provided by Syarikat Air Perlis (SAP) - 2025. Mata Ayer town is also known as "Pekan Pokok Petai" or translated as "Petai Tree Town" by older generations. It has grocery shops, post office, barbers, fruit, vegetable, fish, chicken, and wholesale outlets and cafés and restaurants. There are also motorcycle and car workshops and hardware outlets.

History of Mata Ayer
