= Simpang Empat, Perlis =

Coordinates: 6°20′N 100°11′E

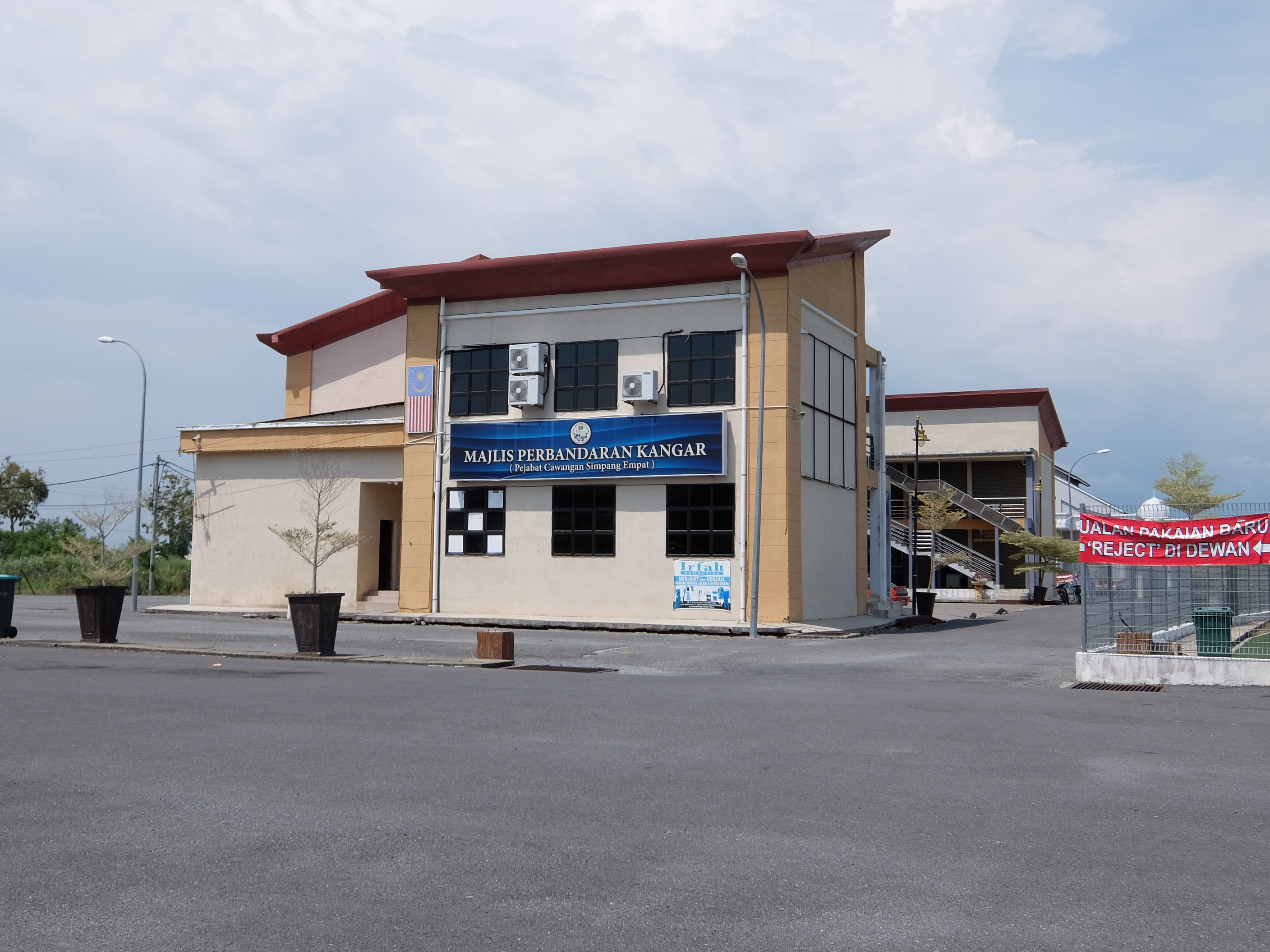
Kangar Municipal Council (Simpang Empat Branch Office)

Simpang Empat or Simpang Ampat is a suburb of Kangar and a small town located in Perlis, Malaysia.
