= Raub, Pahang =

Raub
- Town and district capital
- Seal
- Interactive map of Raub
- Coordinates: 3°47′42.8″N 101°51′21.5″E
- Country: Malaysia
- State: Pahang
- District: Raub

Government
  - Body: Raub District Council
  - President: Haji Khairulanuar bin Mahmood

Area (MDR Area)
  - Total: 977.207 km^{2} (377.302 sq mi)

Population (2010)
  - Total: 91,731
  - Density: 93.871/km^{2} (243.12/sq mi)
- Postcode: 27xxx
- Calling code: +6-09
- Vehicle registration: C
- MP: Tengku Zulpuri Shah Raja Puji (DAP)

Raub is a town in Raub District, Pahang, Malaysia. Raub is one of the oldest towns in Pahang.

== History ==
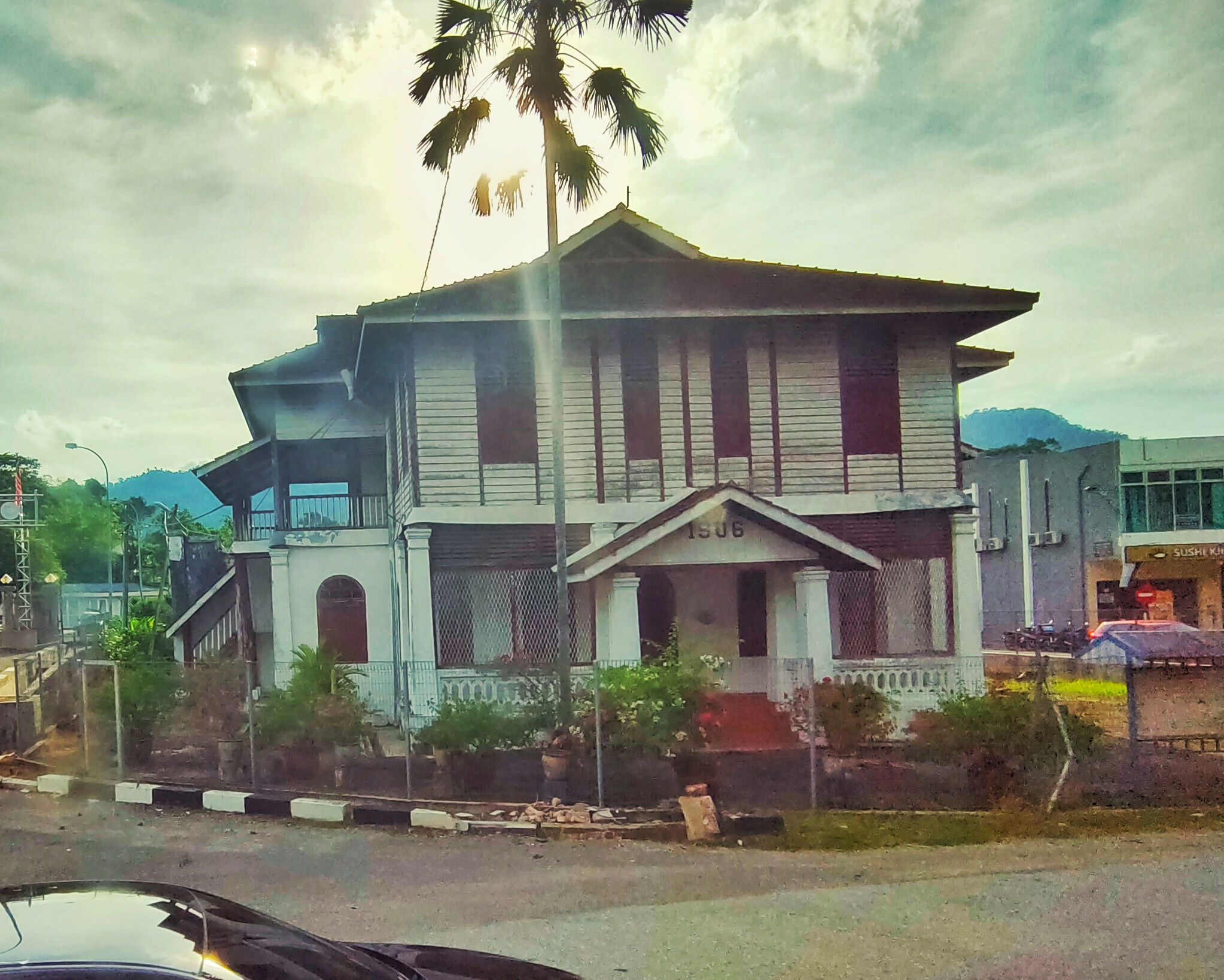
This building is the old headquarters of Raub District police. Built in 1906, it is one of a number of British colonial era buildings in Raub Town.

Raub was explored and founded in the 18th century. It is historically a gold mining settlement, and the gold mining industry is now undergoing something of a resurgence as the gold price has risen. According to the history, this mining centre was named Raub after a group of miners found a handful of gold in every tray of sand they dig. This is described by J.A. Richardson in his book, The Geology and Mineral Resources of the Neighbourhood of Raub Pahang. According to him (page 36), "People found that for every "dulang" of sand there was a handful (raub) of gold". The old folks' tale recounts that in the early 19th century, an old man and his two sons discovered gold every time they scooped up the earth in Raub. Thus, the town and the district derived their name from the Malay word raub which means "scoop".

Raub became famous in the early 20th century for its mining resource (gold). Then, gold mining in Raub was operated by Raub Australian Gold Mine (RAGM), a company registered in 1889 in Queensland, Australia. The company was initially known as Australian Syndicate Ltd and later as Australian Gold Mining Co. Ltd in 1892. RAGM operated until 1961.

The mining method used in Raub is shaft mining and started at the Raub Hole. This area is now known as Bukit Koman. The mining activity became a valuable heritage for Raub district. The main road in Raub Bibby Road, was named after the company's first manager, William Bibby. Mason Road was named after the first district officer J S Mason. Bukit Koman was once dubbed "Malaysian capital of gold" as the result of rapid development of gold mining.

Communist threat in the 1940s in Raub resulted in the erection of new settlements. Among them are Cheroh (1948), Sang Lee (1948), Sungai Ruan (1948), Sungai Chetang (1948), Bukit Koman (1949), Sempalit (1950), Sungai Lui (1950), Tras (1950) and Sungai Klau (1960).

There are a lot of British style buildings in Raub, especially along Mason Road (now known as Jalan Tengku Abdullah). Most of the buildings in Raub were built during the pre-World War II era. Some examples of the pre-war buildings in Raub are the old Police Station of Raub (built in 1906) and the Raub District Council Building.

== Economy ==
After the gold mines were depleted, the main economic activity of Raub is agriculture. Main commodity crops in Raub are natural rubber, oil palm, cocoa and local fruits, like durians. The town, styled as the "durian capital of Malaysia", attracts a steady stream of visitors, especially tourists from Singapore and China.

A new company, Peninsular Gold, has restarted gold mining at the Raub mine. Initially, the company recovered gold from the tailings dumps from the old mine, but started mining fresh ore again in 2011. A major drilling campaign is in progress, exploring additional resources adjacent and below the old mine.

== Government and administration ==
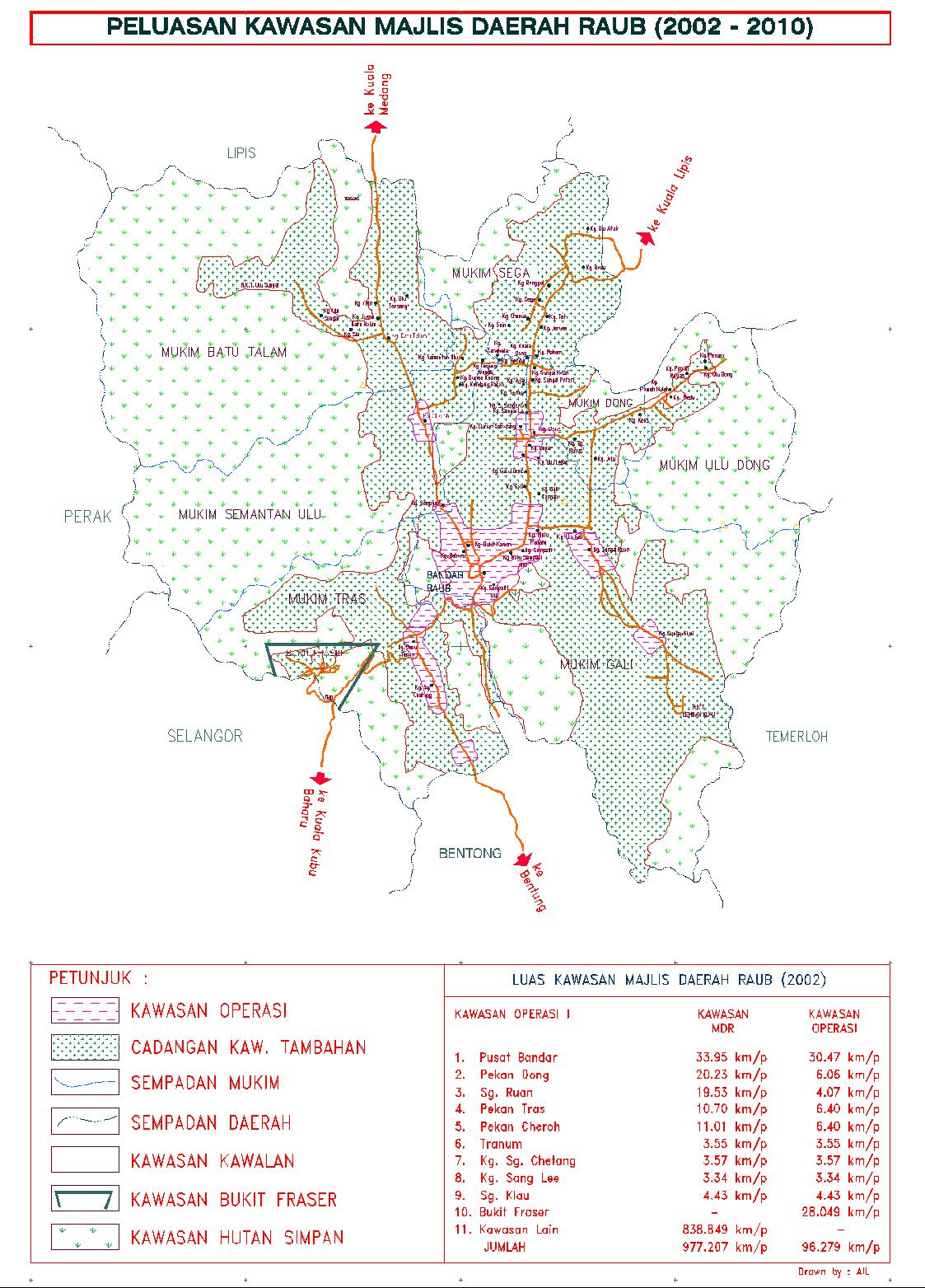
Map of Raub District Council.

Raub is administered by the Raub District Council; its president is Haji Khairulanuar bin Mahmood. Raub has its own constituency in the Dewan Rakyat of the Malaysian Parliament. The incumbent MP is Chow Yu Hui from DAP.

In turn, Raub delivers three seats to the Pahang State Legislative Assembly, comprising Batu Talam, Tras and Dong.

Raub is the only place in western Pahang (Raub, Bentong and Kuala Lipis) that has state and federal-level administrative offices. There is a landmark building, situated next to Taman Bukit Koman (not to be confused with Kampung Bukit Koman), which contains most of the administrative offices, called Bangunan Gunasama Persekutuan. Inside Bangunan Gunasama Persekutuan, there are District Immigration Department, National Registry Department (District Branch) Office and other important offices in that building also. Besides that, there is Land Office which is on top of a hill, beside Taman Shahbandar, provides opportunity to renew their land title and land grant, unlike Bentong, they need to come to Raub to renew their land title. Actually, the existence of those administrative offices has its roots. During the early 20th century, because of massive gold mining activity, Raub was quickly developed and at once, it was tipped as the future administrative state capital for Pahang. However, at the last minute, Residence of Pahang decided to shift state administrative capital to Kuantan and left out Raub. Although Raub did not become state capital, however, British left a lot of administrative buildings in Raub, including the Resident's official residence (the present Raub District Officer's official residence) was situated in Raub.

== Transport ==
=== Car ===
Federal Route 8 is the main route to Raub. Motorists from Kuala Lumpur will usually exit the East Coast Expressway at Bentong and then enter highway Federal Route 8 to get to Raub or Kuala Lipis or exit at Central Spine Road and exit at Mempaga then enter highway Federal Route 8 to get to Raub or Kuala Lipis . Raub is also a stopover for motorists travelling to Kota Bharu, which is the northern end of highway 8.

Raub is the eastern end of Federal Route 55, which begins in Kuala Kubu Bharu in Selangor and passing through the hill resort of Fraser's Hill in the process. As a result, Route Federal Route 55 is an alternative to the Karak Highway for Selangor/Kuala Lumpur/Klang Valley motorists.

Raub is also a gateway to the hill resort of Cameron Highlands, using Pahang State Route C5.

=== Public transport ===
Currently stage bus in western Pahang area is being served by private stage bus company. Stage buses in Raub are operated by several companies which include Pahang Lin Siong (to Lipis), Sanwa Tours (to Gombak LRT station, MARA Liner (to FELDA area) and Central Pahang (to Titiwangsa station). Union and Central Pahang merged a few years ago and has been operating as a single entity under Central Pahang. Besides these local companies, other interstate express coaches also stop by Raub express bus station as the town is strategically located along routes to cities like Gua Musang and Kota Bharu in the eastern states of Peninsular Malaysia.

Raub is also not served by the KTM Intercity, given its mountainous terrain. The closest station will be Kuala Lipis.
