= Batu Malim massacre =

1946 sectarian massacre in British Malaya

- Location: Batu Malim, Pahang, Malaya
- Date: 11 February 1946; ~10:00 a.m. (UTC +8)
- Attack type: Ethnic cleansing, mass murder
- Deaths: 32
- Injuries: 27
- Perpetrators: Disbanded members of the Pahang Territorial Army and Malay villagers
- No. of participants: 200
- Motive: Reprisals from Sino–Malay ethnic violence following the end of the Japanese occupation of Malaya
- Verdict: 22 men sentenced to death, later commuted to imprisonment ranging from 3 to 15 years

On 11 February 1946, 200 Malay villagers of Batu Malim, a village in Pahang, under the leadership of Salimin Towi Rono, organised an attack on Chinese residents from the village as retaliation against the alleged seizing and destruction of local Malay farmland by Chinese villagers and the Malayan Peoples' Anti-Japanese Army. The clashes killed 32 people, most of whom were Chinese, and injured 27 others.

Thirty people were arrested in connection with the killings, all of whom, including Salimin, were disbanded members from the Pahang Territorial Army (Wataniah Pahang). The murder trial of the massacre, which involved 25 accused, was described as "one of the biggest cases ever heard [in Malaya]", and ended with 22 rioters sentenced to death, although their sentences were later commuted.

== History ==
=== Background ===
Throughout 1945 and 1946, postwar Malaya was marred by extensive sectarian violence between the ethnic Chinese and Malays, who had generally contrasting ends of treatment and oppression under the Japanese occupation of Malaya.

Batu Malim, a village 24 kilometres from Raub in Pahang, served as the wartime headquarters of the Pahang Territorial Army (Wataniah Pahang), an anti-Japanese resistance group under Force 136 against the occupying Japanese forces.

Before the attacks, tensions between the Malay and Chinese populace in Batu Malim ran high. After the Japanese surrender, 35 armed soldiers of the Malayan Peoples' Anti-Japanese Army (MPAJA) entered the village and tried to seize Malay land. Complaints were made by Malay villagers to the authorities that Chinese villagers had destroyed their vegetable gardens. A Malay reportedly declared that the only solution to these controversies was to "wipe out all the Chinese".

=== Attacks ===
On 11 February 1946, a Malay villager and former member of the Wataniah Pahang, Salimin Towi Rono, organised a mob of 200 people at the town's marketplace for reprisals against the MPAJA. Around 150 to 200 Chinese villagers were present at the marketplace for the weekly market. After some time, Malay traders began shutting their shops, which was later cited as an indication of trouble.

A police officer from Cheroh, Mohamad Said, received information of potential violence and contacted the acting district officer of Raub, Mohammad Annuar. Annuar, accompanied by the village chief, Tengku Zohri, and two constables, arrived at the market to dissuade the mob from further violence by trying to promise Chinese compensation for the lost farmland and swift punishments for anyone who had involved in the seizing. Annuar described the mob leaders as "religious fanatics" trying to incite violence around the market. This description was suggested to be an indication of the mob's influences from the Sabilillah movement.

Salimin complained to Annuar that over thirty Chinese had destroyed his sugar plantation, and he was going to "kill the Chinese". Despite receiving assurances from Chinese village leaders, the mob, armed with machetes, believed they were "invulnerable" and refused to disperse. While talking to a furious Salimin, the officials were cornered by armed villagers. A villager, 30 yards behind Annuar, shouted in Malay, "Ini apa dia lagi?" ("What else does he want?"), and stabbed a Chinese person in the back. A fight ensued where the mob chased and killed several Chinese marketgoers, including a mother and her child. At around 10:00 a.m., mosque drums (or gongs) were sounded across the village, which was interpreted as a signal to attack.

In retaliation against the attacks, the Chinese villagers armed themselves with spears and knives and fought the mob, which injured several Malays. Realising the futility of the situation, Annuar sent a messenger to appeal for police reinforcements. He attempted to disperse the rioters with several policemen, but they were resisted and overpowered by the mob. Armed reinforcements only arrived after the riots ended.

During the riots, Annuar obtained a truck, loaded injured Malays, and drove towards Raub. Some Malays boarded the truck, where it was alleged that they disembarked at Batu Talam and killed a Chinese woman and her child. Following the attacks, the military was sent to patrol the area.

== Aftermath ==
=== Victims ===
Thirty-two people were killed in the clashes, which concentrated around the village's market area. Twenty-seven people were injured. Thirty deaths were Chinese, including 2 women and 10 children between the ages of two to ten. Initial reports of the death toll numbered up to 100 Chinese villagers, although the report was quickly disproven.

An official statement regarding the killings was published by the British Military Administration on 28 February 1946.

=== Criminal cases ===
After the killings, 30 people, including Salimin, were arrested and charged by the authorities for murder. All of the arrested were former members of the Wataniah. The hearing for the arrested began on 23 May 1946 at Raub. C.C.C. Lylie led the prosecution, while the defence was led by R.P.S. Rajasooria, Said On and Sardon Jubir. The case was described as "one of the biggest cases ever heard [in Malaya]".

Twenty-five of the arrested were convicted of rioting and murder and sentenced to death. However, on 7 August 1946, a petition for review was lodged by Rajasooria and Jubir related to the sentencing of the 22 men. On 16 December, Edward Gent, governor of the Malayan Union, commuted the death sentences of all 22 men. One person was pardoned and released, while the remaining 21 men were given sentences ranging from imprisonment between 3 and 15 years.

Abdul Razak Hussein, a former member of the Wataniah Pahang, was said to have introduced Sardon Jubir to organise the defence of Wataniah members accused of murder. The trial sparked Abdul Razak's interest in law, where he eventually studied in London from 1947 to 1950.

== See also ==
- Malayan Emergency
- 13 May incident
