= Abd. Aziz Mat Kiram =

Malaysian politician

Yang Berhormat Dato' Abd Aziz Mat Kiram DSAP DIMP SMP KMN MLA
- عَبْدٱلْعَزِيز مَت كِرَام

Member of the Pahang State Executive Council
- In office 5 June 2018 – 28 November 2022 (Rural Development and Aboriginal Affairs)
- Monarchs: Ahmad Shah (2018–2019); Abdullah (2019–2022)
- Menteri Besar: Wan Rosdy Wan Ismail
- Preceded by: Shafik Fauzan Sharif (Rural Development); Adnan Yaakob (Aboriginal Affairs)
- Succeeded by: Syed Ibrahim Syed Ahmad
- Constituency: Batu Talam

Member of the Pahang State Legislative Assembly for Batu Talam
- Incumbent
- Assumed office 28 January 2007
- Preceded by: Tengku Paris Tengku Razlan (BN–UMNO)
- Majority: 5,857 (2007); 2,425 (2008); 4,137 (2013); 4,320 (2018); 2,869 (2022)

Personal details
- Born: Abdul Aziz Mat Kiram Pahang, Malaysia
- Citizenship: Malaysian
- Party: United Malays National Organisation (UMNO)
- Other political affiliations: Barisan Nasional (BN)
- Occupation: Politician

Abd Aziz bin Mat Kiram is a Malaysian politician who has served as Member of the Pahang State Legislative Assembly (MLA) for Batu Talam since January 2007, succeeding Tengku Paris Tengku Razlan who died in December 2006. He served as Member of the Pahang State Executive Council (EXCO) in the Barisan Nasional (BN) state administration under Menteri Besar Wan Rosdy Wan Ismail from May 2018 to November 2022. He is a member and the Division Chief of Raub of the United Malays National Organisation (UMNO), a component party of the BN coalition.

== Election results ==
Pahang State Legislative Assembly
Year	Constituency	Candidate	Votes	Pct	Opponent(s)	Votes	Pct	Ballots cast	Majority	Turnout
2007	N06 Batu Talam	Abd. Aziz Mat Kiram (UMNO)	6,276	93.74%	Ng Chee Pang (IND)	419	6.26%	7,080	5,857	67.32%
2008	N06 Batu Talam	Abd. Aziz Mat Kiram (UMNO)	5,632	63.65%	Abdullah Suhaimin Sa`at (PAS)	3,217	36.35%	9,086	2,425	79.00%
2013	N06 Batu Talam	Abd. Aziz Mat Kiram (UMNO)	7,852	67.88%	Khairul Hakimin Mohd Ali (PKR)	3,715	32.12%	11,851	4,137	84.80%
2018	N06 Batu Talam	Abd. Aziz Mat Kiram (UMNO)	6,922	57.85%	Tengku Abdul Rahman Tengku Ja'afar (PAS)	2,602	21.75%	12,362	4,320	81.40%
2018	N06 Batu Talam	Abd. Aziz Mat Kiram (UMNO)	6,922	57.85%	Dasimah Zainudin (PKR)	2,441	20.40%	12,362	4,320	81.40%
2022	N06 Batu Talam	Abd. Aziz Mat Kiram (UMNO)	7,992	52.98%	Ahmad Sabri Mat Dui (BERSATU)	5,123	33.96%	15,372	2,869	78.1%
2022	N06 Batu Talam	Abd. Aziz Mat Kiram (UMNO)	7,992	52.98%	Shahuddin Abdul Rahman (PKR)	1,969	13.05%	15,372	2,869	78.1%

== Honours ==
- Malaysia
  - Officer of the Order of the Defender of the Realm (KMN) (2007)
- Pahang
  - Knight Companion of the Order of Sultan Ahmad Shah of Pahang (DSAP) – Dato' (2018)
  - Knight Companion of the Order of the Crown of Pahang (DIMP) – Dato' (2009)
  - Companion of the Order of the Crown of Pahang (SMP) (2007)
