= Bekor massacre =

Massacre in British Malaya

- Location: Bekor, Perak, Malaya
- Date: 5–6 March 1946
- Attack type: Ethnic cleansing, mass murder
- Deaths: 62–80
- Injuries: At least 100
- Perpetrator: Local Chinese militias or MPAJA guerilla soldiers
- No. of participants: 5 March: 100; 6 March: 500–1,000
- Motive: Reprisals from Sino–Malay ethnic violence following the end of the Japanese occupation of Malaya
- Verdict: 19 men sentenced to death (18 at Bekor, 1 at Manong): 9 pardoned, 9 commuted to imprisonment,

The Bekor massacre was a mass killing that occurred from 5 to 6 March 1946 when Chinese militiamen or bandits related to the Malayan Peoples' Anti-Japanese Army (MPAJA) attacked the village of Bekor in Perak, Malaya. Violence was also reported in the nearby village of Mahong. The clashes were intended as reprisals for racially-motivated murders of Chinese villagers in Bekor, with the goal to systematically remove the Malay population from Bekor. At least 62 people were killed, all but one of whom were Malay, and resulted in the widespread destruction of Bekor.

The attacks on Bekor represented the first major killings committed by the Chinese against the Malays during the widespread sectarian violence across Malaya between 1945 and 1946. Former Japanese officers may have been implicated in inciting tensions and contributed to the massacre. Ultimately, 23 men were arrested, while 19 men were sentenced to death in related to the killings, although no executions were ever carried out.

== Background ==
Bekor is a village 26 kilometres south of Kuala Kangsar, located next on the left bank of the Perak River. According to the 1947 Malayan census, the village was located in Mukim Senggang of Kuala Kangsar District, which had a population of 9,846 people, of whom 6,207 people are Malays.

In the pre-war era, Bekor had a population of 700 to 800 Malays and 50 Chinese and Indian villagers. Most Malay villagers were involved in rice farming while the Chinese were mostly miners and rubber tappers from nearby plantations. Bekor's tin mines, controlled by the Malays, were leased to the Chinese, resulting in a flourishing Chinese population with frequent migration from nearby Kinta District and the establishment of Chinese schools and institutions in the village. The relationship between various ethnic populations in Bekor was described as "cordial".

=== Japanese occupation of Bekor, 1942–1945 ===
During the early-stages of the Japanese occupation of Malaya, Bekor's villagers were notably supportive of the Malayan Peoples' Anti-Japanese Army (MPAJA). The MPAJA considered Bekor to be a strategic chokepoint as it provided easy access to their operational headquarters along Sungai Siput. The Japanese authorities responded by forming a local defense militia (Jikeidan) in Bekor in March 1942 to combat communist influence.

The MPAJA frequently conducted ambushes and raids on Bekor, especially on suspected collaborators colluding with Japanese authorities. In January 1944, three teachers of the Bekor Malay School, who displayed a lack of support for the MPAJA, were ambushed and shot by MPAJA guerillas. MPAJA members also infiltrated Bekor under false identities and organised anti-Japanese speeches, such as in the local mosque, earning support from Malay villagers.

=== MPAJA influence and deterioration of ethnic relations, 1945–1946 ===
By 1945, the MPAJA levied taxes on the village and recruited local villagers as guerilla soldiers, who were sent for training at Sungai Siput. Following the Japanese surrender, they seized the Bekor Malay School and converted it as the operational headquarters for their 13th Battalion. A kangaroo court was set up in the school grounds to prosecute perceived "traitors" who had collaborated with the Japanese authorities. These collaborators, who were Malay, were sentenced to death and executed by the MPAJA guerillas, creating discontent among Malay members of the MPAJA, who left in protest.

On 2 January 1946, a racial riot broke in Bekor, leaving one dead and four missing. On 8 January, a statement released by the 25th Indian Division claimed that sectarian violence in Perak was confined to the Dindings, while troubles in Bekor had "subsided" following meetings called by the military authorities with the presence of civil officials, Chinese and Malay leaders, and Abdul Aziz al-Muʽtasim Billah Shah, the Sultan of Perak.

Attempts were made for reconciliation, including a meeting at nearby Manong between local Chinese leaders and the Malay ulama, who demanded concessions for disarming local MPAJA militias, returning seized lands, and the recovery of missing Malays who were brought by the MPAJA into the jungles. Another meeting was organised by English officials and was attended by the village's Malay and Chinese leaders.

== Attacks ==
=== Prelude ===
The direct cause of the massacre in Bekor was believed to have spawned from Malay attacks on Chinese villagers on 28 February 1946. In one account, several Malay villagers in Bekor attacked and killed a Chinese person who was carrying rice sacks from Klian to Menong. Another interpretation involved two Chinese people, where one of them leaped into the Perak River for safety. An alternate account mentioned the murder of a Chinese chicken farmer by a Malay villager named Kassim Alang Mat Yasin on the same day, who threw this body into the Perak River. The body was discovered by Chinese villagers and was transported back to Bekor.

On 4 March 1946, four Chinese houses and a Chinese school in Bekor was set on fire, creating panic among the village's Chinese community, who fled to a nearby estate. Another incident reported that over 100 Chinese villagers fled Bekor after they were chased by Malay villagers, who sought retaliation for the destruction of their farmland caused by the unauthorised construction of a road.

=== Main siege ===
At 10:00 a.m. on 5 March 1946, a Chinese militia of 100 people arrived at Bekor and entered the town. They were encountered and resisted by a group of armed Malay militias led by a local ulama, Salleh Abdul Manan. Fighting lasted for two hours without any deaths, but resulted in the burning of seven Chinese houses. The Chinese militia retreated after the fight.

On 6 March, the Chinese militia, now numbered at 500 men, commenced a second attack from Klian at 5:00 a.m. The attack came as a surprise to the Bekor villagers who were still in their sleep. Awakened villagers sounded drums throughout Bekor as a warning to the militia's arrival, who sieged the village's Malay quarters. The militia then destroyed the bridge across Bekor River and occupied intersections and strongpoints across the village, blocking access of some parts of Bekor from the rest of the region. The militia searched house-by-house for any hiding villagers, with any Malay found on sight stabbed to death or shot. The houses were then torched and destroyed.

Several woman and children were killed in their sleep, although some militiamen were reported to have spared them. Some Malays tried to fight back but were outnumbered by the Chinese militia. Most deaths were found at the local mosque, where 56 people were stabbed to death while conducting their morning prayers. Nineteen houses and the local mosque were set on fire. The Chinese militia would leave at around 9:00 a.m.

Spillovers were also recorded in nearby Manong, where local mosques signaled drums as a call for attack, which resulted in the deaths of a Chinese and a Malay villager.

=== Possible Japanese influence ===
A report from Malaya Tribune dated 11 March 1946 reported the involvement of former Japanese officers in the massacre. One of the identified officers was believed to be the "bearded captain" of the Japanese garrison in Bekor in early-1945. The former soldiers were said to have bribed local Chinese bandits in gold to incite trouble at Bekor.

== Aftermath ==
=== Victims ===
At least 62 people were killed in the clashes, all of whom except for one were Malay. Fifty-six bodies were recovered at Bekor mosque, while at least two bodies were found at Manong. Four bodies were found floating on the Perak River. Among the dead, only one had gunshot wounds, while the rest were stabbed to death. A report from the British Military Administration reported 76 deaths, while alternate sources pointed different death tolls of 70, 78, 80, or over 100 people.

Hundreds of Chinese and Malay refugees fled to Kuala Kangsar, Taiping, and Ipoh for safety, although most of them returned after significant military presence stabilized the local situation.

=== Criminal cases ===
Twenty-two to 28 people were arrested in association with the massacre. A preliminary inquiry was held on 24 October 1946 at the District Court of Kuala Kangsar, which attracted a mixed crowd of hundreds of Chinese and Malay spectators. Among the prisoners include a young Chinese girl.

The largest hearing related to the massacre began on 19 February 1947, involving 62 witnesses testifying for the prosecution and 28 for the defence. On 5 March, a year after the massacre, 18 prisoners, mostly "middle-aged Chinese cultivators", were sentenced to death. The final trial related to the case occurred on 12 June 1947, when a Malay man was sentenced to death for murdering a Chinese villager in Manong hours after the massacre.

An appeal was made on 15 March 1947 in relation to the 18 death sentences. On 27 June, 9 of the 18 sentenced were pardoned and released. The remaining 9 prisoners had their death sentences commuted to imprisonment by Edward Gent, Governor of the Malayan Union on 13 August 1947.

Gent's decision to reprieve the Chinese convicts was condemned by the Malay community, although comparisons were made with the Batu Malim massacre a few months prior where Gent had done a similar move but towards Malay convicts who were sentenced for indiscriminately murdering Chinese locals there.

== Legacy ==
Following the incident, Chinese and Malay communities issued statements urging tolerance and an end of sectarian violence across Malaya. The incident was described by historian Cheah Boon Kheng as “the first incident in which the Chinese were the aggressors [in the postwar Sino–Malay racial conflicts of Malaya]".

In July 1973, communist guerillas were spotted again near Bekor, prompting a 24-hour curfew of the region and a visit from the Minister of Agriculture and Land, Ghazali Jawi. On 15 December 2024, a novel adaptation of the massacre, Ketika itu di Bekor, was published by the Dewan Bahasa dan Pustaka.

== See also ==
- 13 May incident
- Batu Malim massacre
