= Batu Talam =

Mukim in Raub District, Pahang, Malaysia

Coordinates: 3°57′49.4″N 101°47′29.2″E

Map of Raub District showing Batu Talam

Batu Talam is a mukim in Raub District, Pahang, Malaysia. In 2020, the population of Batu Talam was 22,505.

== Notable events ==
- 1720s – Following the history of Pahang, Batu Talam is opened by Tok De Abdul Rahman as a settlement.
- 1946 – Ethnic violence against Malaysian Chinese in Batu Talam results in at least 20 deaths.
- 1993 – Pahang State Legislative Assembly assemblyman Datuk Mazlan Idris is murdered by Mona Fandey, Nor Affendy Abdul Rahman, and Juraimi Husin.
- 2007 – Batu Talam becomes the first constituency in Malaysia to have had two by-elections, after a by-election is held to replace Tengku Paris Tengku Razlan upon his death. Following boycotts by the Malaysian Islamic Party and the People's Justice Party, Barisan Nasional retained the Batu Talam seat in this by-election.
