= Raub District =

- District of Pahang
- Daerah Raub
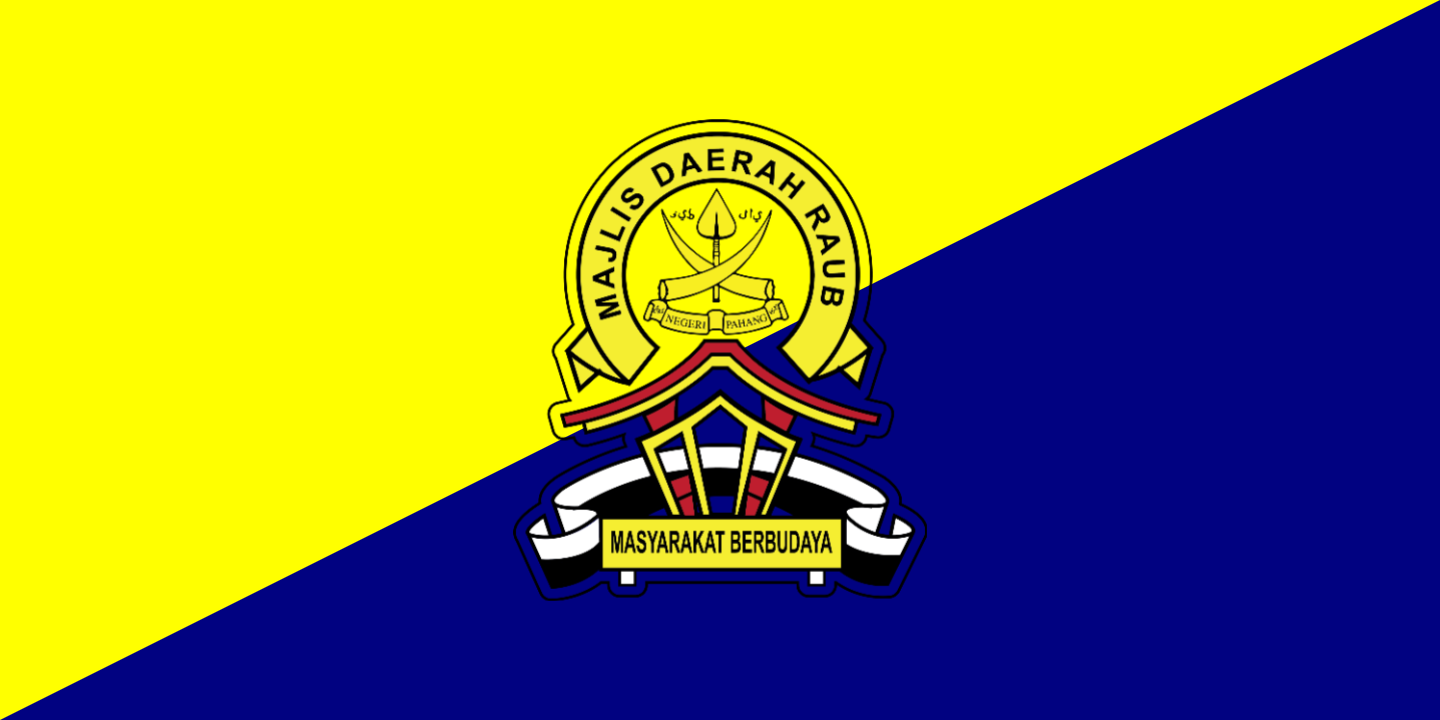
- Flag Seal

- Location of Raub District in Pahang
- Interactive map of Raub District
- Location of Raub District in Malaysia
- Coordinates: 3°50′N 101°50′E
- Country: Malaysia
- State: Pahang
- Seat: Raub
- Local area government(s): Raub District Council

Government
  - District officer: Handan Hussin

Area
  - Total: 2,268.33 km^{2} (875.81 sq mi)

Population (2010)
  - Total: 92,162
  - Density: 40.630/km^{2} (105.23/sq mi)
- Time zone: UTC+8 (MST)
  - Summer (DST): UTC+8 (Not observed)
- Postcode: 27xxx, 49xxx (Fraser's Hill)
- Calling code: +6-09
- Vehicle registration plates: C

Raub District is a district in Pahang, Malaysia. Located in the west of the state, the district borders Lipis District to the north, Jerantut District to the east, Temerloh District to the southeast, Bentong District to the south, and the districts of Hulu Selangor and Muallim, respectively situated in the states of Selangor and Perak, to the west. Raub district consists of seven mukim (sub-districts), namely Batu Talam, Sega, Semantan Ulu, Dong, Ulu Dong, Gali and Tras. With an area of 2,271 km^{2}, Raub District is sandwiched between the Titiwangsa Mountains and the Benom Massif. Raub District also is home to the hill station of Fraser's Hill. The administrative seat of this district is the town of Raub.

== Demographics ==
Historical population
Year	Pop.	±%
1991	73,085	—
2000	79,488	+8.8%
2010	91,731	+15.4%
2020	96,139	+4.8%

The following is based on Department of Statistics Malaysia 2010 census.

Ethnic groups in Raub, 2010 census
Ethnicity	Population	Percentage
Bumiputera	58,325	63.3%
Chinese	27,684	30.0%
Indian	5,871	6.4%
Others	282	0.3%
Total	92,162	100%

== Federal Parliament and State Assembly Seats ==
Raub district representative in the Federal Parliament (Dewan Rakyat)

Parliament	Seat Name	Member of Parliament	Party
P80	Raub	Chow Yu Hui	Pakatan Harapan (DAP)

List of Raub district representatives in the State Legislative Assembly (Dewan Undangan Negeri)

Parliament	State	Seat Name	State Assemblyman	Party
P80	N6	Batu Talam	Abdul Aziz Mat Kiram	Barisan Nasional (UMNO)
P80	N7	Tras	Tengku Zulpuri Shah Raja Puji	Pakatan Harapan (DAP)
P80	N8	Dong	Shahiruddin Ab Moin	Barisan Nasional (UMNO)

== Subdistricts ==
Map of Raub district.

Raub District is divided into 7 mukims, which are:

- Batu Talam (57,000 Ha)
- Dong (7,500 Ha)
- Gali (65,300 Ha)(Capital)
- Hulu Dong (19,200 Ha)
- Sega (15,500 Ha)
- Semantan Hulu (33,400 Ha)
- Teras (29,000 Ha)

== Townships ==
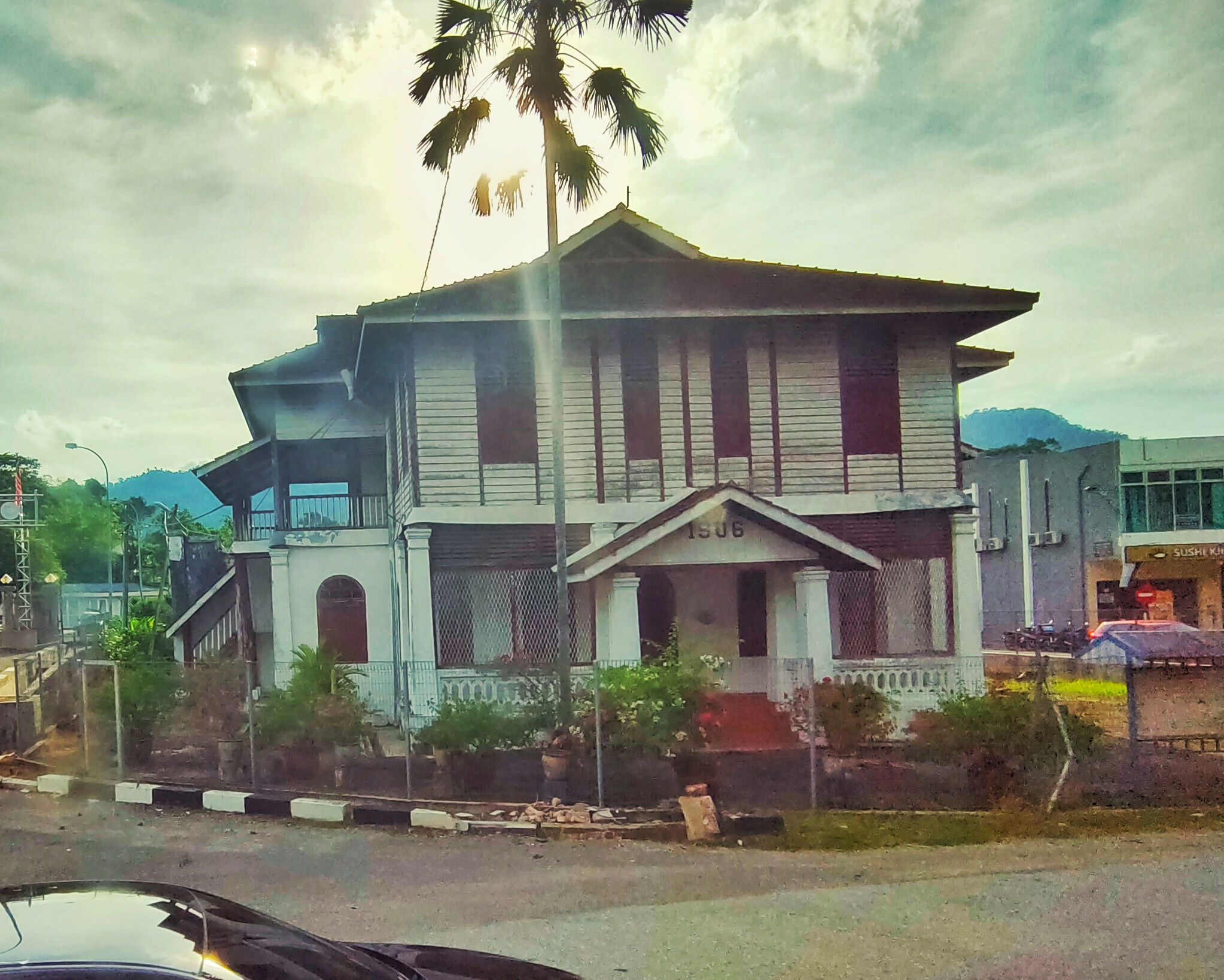
Old headquarters of Raub District police. Built in 1906, it is one of a number of British colonial era buildings in Raub Town.

- Raub
- Tras
- Batu Talam
- Dong
- Sang Lee
- Sungai Chetang
- Fraser's Hill
- Bukit Koman
- Simpang Kalang
- Cheroh
- Batu 12
- Sempalit
- Sungai Ruan
- Sungai Krau
- Sungai Lui
- Sungai Chalit
- Jenud
- Sega Lama
- Ulu Renggol
- Jeruas
- Sengkela
- Chenua
- Kuala Atok
- Ulu Atok
- Jeram Besu
- Felda Krau
- Felda Tersang
- Pos Buntu
- Felda Lembah Klau

== See also ==
- Districts of Malaysia
