= Sungai Ruan =

- District of Raub

Other transcription(s)
  - Chinese: 雙溪蘭
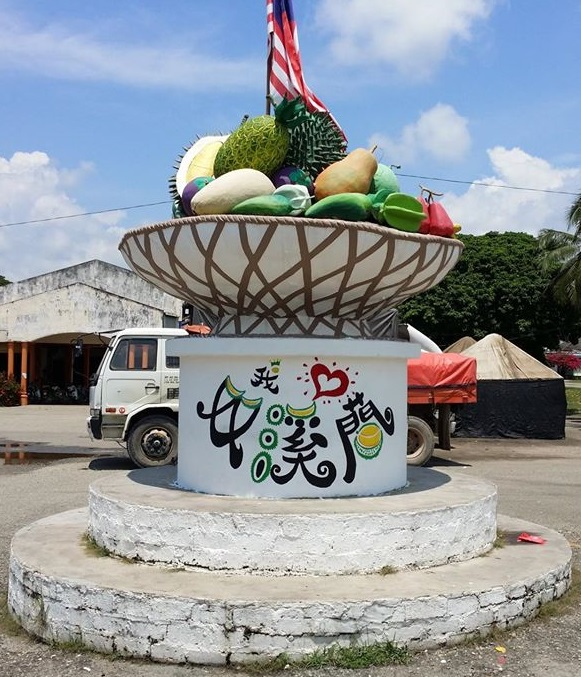
- Nickname: Village of Fruit or SR Village
- Interactive map of Sungai Ruan
- Coordinates: 3°47′N 101°52′E
- Country: Malaysia
- State: Pahang
- Seat: Raub
- Modern Sultanate: 1884
- Federated into FMS: 1895
- Japanese occupation: 1942
- Accession into Federation of Malaya: 1948
- Independence as part of the Federation of Malaya: 31 August 1957
- Federated as part of Malaysia: 16 September 1963

Government
  - Sultan: Al-Sultan Abdullah
  - Menteri Besar: (BN-UMNO); Wan Rosdy Wan Ismail
  - District Officer / MP: (DAP); Tengku Zulpuri Shah Raja Puji

Area
  - Total: 9.7 km^{2} (3.7 sq mi)

Population
  - Total: 6,000
  - Density: 620/km^{2} (1,600/sq mi)
- Time zone: UTC+8 (MST)
  - Summer (DST): Not observed
- Postal Code: 27500
- Calling Code: +6-09 (Pahang except as noted)
- Vehicle registration: C

Sungai Ruan is a village located in the Raub District in the Pahang state of Malaysia. It is about 58.1 mi (or 93.5 km) north of Kuala Lumpur, the country's capital, or about 12.7 km from the Raub town.

Covering a total area of 9.7 square km at an average elevation of 227 meters above sea level, the village is surrounded by hills, forest and plantations with a population of about 6,000 people.

Sungai Ruan is a predominantly Chinese new village and has been home to mostly Cantonese-speaking residents since its existence under the British rule. Most residents are rubber tappers and farmers owning oil palm, fruit and orchard plantations.

During peak seasons, residents are occupied in harvesting Durians, especially the cultivar Musang King being the most popular variety of the fruit, attracting tourists and bringing economic development to the village.

== History ==
=== 1940–1979 ===
In the early 1950s, it was a series of Chinese settlements set up by the British colonial government of Malaya in a 12-year state of emergency.

In order to prevent the Chinese in the suburbs from coming into contact with and threatening the Malayan Communist guerrillas in the forest, the British colonial government actively launched the national immigration policy, and then concentrated the Chinese scattered in the suburbs and set up a Chinese new village.

During the martial law period, the Sungai Ruan Village at that time was the "Black Zone of the Communist Party".

From 1940 to 1987, the Raub bastion inclusive of Sungai Ruan near Felda Lembah Klau was heavily infiltrated by the Malayan Communist Party (MCP). Communist threats in 1940s in Raub resulted in erections of new settlements.

- (1948) Cheroh
- (1948) Sang Lee
- (1948) Sungai Ruan
- (1948) Sungai Chetang
- (1949) Bukit Koman
- (1950) Sempalit
- (1950) Sungai Lui
- (1950) Tras
- (1960) Sungai Klau

After the World War II, most villagers started planting rubber trees, followed by cocoa and durians. From 1946 to 1947, there were approximately 10 wooden houses and a few of people in the village.

In 1951, many residents from other villages moved in to work on plantations due to the rich soil. Up until now there are more than thousand of families staying in Sungai Ruan. Most of villager start to focus on education for their children.

During 1960–70, Sungai Ruan harvested most fruits in Pahang and became a well-known fruit village, producing Durians and other best selling fruits such as Bananas, Guavas and Cocoa beans in Malaysia. The population in the village grew more than 3–5% with residents coming in from other villages to participate in fruit plantations.

=== 1980–1999 ===
Pahang village picked as home of 'king of durians'

PAHANG • A village in Pahang state in Malaysia has been chosen as the home of the country's "king of durians", the golden Musang King durian.

The Sungai Ruan village in Raub town is being promoted as a Malaysian eco-tourism destination in conjunction with the ongoing Visit Pahang Year 2017.

The village itself is located in an area in Pahang known for its durian orchards.

At a ceremony last Saturday, China's economic and commerce attache in Malaysia, Ms Shi Ziming, noted that Chinese President Xi Jinping had sampled the Musang King in 2013 during his official visit to Malaysia and found the fruit "tasty and extraordinary".

"This species of durian definitely has the potential to go big and create a niche market in China," she said.

Malaysian Chinese Association vice-president Chew Mei Fun said that, several years ago, the price of the Musang King was about RM5 to RM12 per kilogram, but today it can go up to RM100 (S$30).

"This helps to raise the income of farmers and boost economic growth for the people of Raub," she said.

"The Musang King will now be an icon for Sungai Ruan to attract more visitors."

— The Straits Times, 15 August 2017.

The population used to be between 6,000 and 7,000 in the 1980s before youths started moving out to cities for studies and jobs.

In 1982, four communist guerrillas were killed by security forces in Sungai Ruan. It was liberated from insurgents after the Malayan Communist Party (MCP) agreed to a peace talk in Haadyai, Thailand on 2 December 1989, as a result of negotiations between the Malaysian Government and the MCP, with the Thai Government as a mediator.

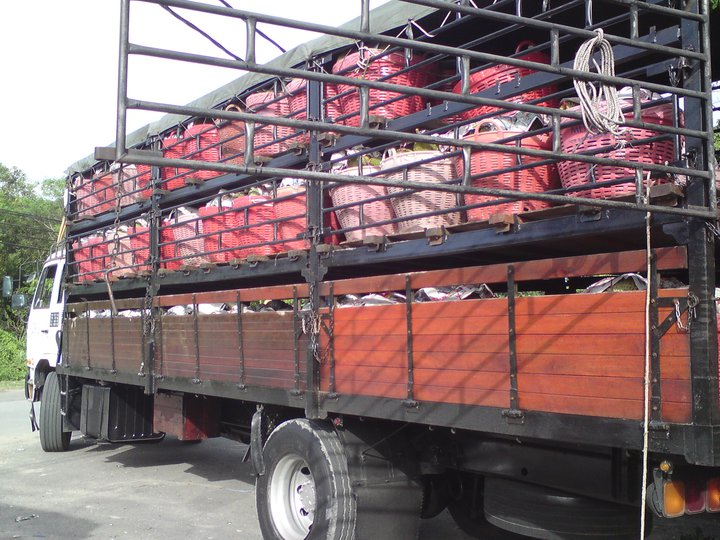
Durian harvest in Sungai Ruan.

After the launch of the campaign to beautify residential areas of villages in Malaysia in 1990, Sungai Ruan residents won the campaign as the 2nd Runner-up in Malaysia 1993 and the 1st Runner-up in 1994 with their diligence, sacrifice and teamwork.

From 1996 to 1998, the villagers had grand celebration ceremonies and fireworks together with Sultan Haji Ahmad Shah during 'Gongxi Raya', a creolised term originating from Malaysia and accepted in Singapore to commemorate the two festivals, Hari Raya Puasa and Chinese New Year, which fell on the same week and became a double celebration within Chinese and Muslim communities.

=== 2000–2009 ===
In 2000s, Sungai Ruan produced peanuts, dragon fruits and coconuts, with peanuts being the best selling during the Chinese New Year when villagers returning home and buying them as a festival gift to friends and relatives.

In 2009, it also benefited from Malaysian government's plan to export frozen durians to China with estimated export between 350 and 500 tonnes a year, while fresh durians export to Singapore was estimated at RM15.4 million in 2010.

=== 2010–present ===
In 2017, Sungai Ruan was synonymous with the Musang King durian in the district. The village was promoted as Malaysia's eco-tourism destination in conjunction with the Visit Pahang Year 2017, with Shi Ziming, China's economic and commerce attache in Malaysia, being present to launch the double events during a dinner gathering of about 2,000 guests, visitors and villagers on 12 August 2017.

Shi considered China and Malaysia as sharing close bilateral ties and their socio-economic cooperation could be strengthened further with the Belt and Road initiative.

"This species of durian definitely has the potential to go big and create a niche market in China. It helps to raise the income of farmers and boost economic growth for the people of Raub."

The Musang King durian will now be an icon for Sungai Ruan to attract more visitors," she said. Event organiser Pahang Chinese Chamber of Commerce and Industry chairman Tan Sri Lam Kam Sang planned to lead a delegation to Shanghai in November 2018 to take part in a food and beverage exposition, which will be supported by the state government as revealed by Pahang executive councillor Datuk Seri Shahiruddin Ab Moin, who has claimed Raub's Musang King durian being the best in the world.

On 3 November 2017, State Co-operatives, Entrepreneurship and Consumer Affairs Exco, Datuk Seri Shahiruddin Ab Moin said the tagline was introduced to boost the revenue of durian entrepreneurs in the district. According to him, the move was also to uplift the agricultural sector in line with the country's development as well as boosting agro-tourism activities by setting up a local fruit garden for domestic and foreign tourists.

"With more than 5,500 hectares of land in Raub, 75 percent of them are planted with these types of durians from D24, D916, D919 and various high quality of durian varieties in Sungai Ruan. About 2,000 to 4,000 hectares of land in Raub, especially in Sungai Ruan, are identified to be planted with durians in the following year," he said.

On 2 May 2018, villagers turned up in droves to welcome Malaysian badminton star Datuk Lee Chong Wei and AirAsia Group CEO Tan Sri Dr.Tony Fernandes, who visited Sungai Ruan, Raub district to show support to then MCA president Datuk Seri Liow Tiong Lai during the 14th General Election campaign.

In 2019, Songkran celebrations are held in Sungai Ruan for 4th times. SMK Sungai Ruan Twenty-four festival drums had a performance on the day and also attracted foreign tourists.

== Demographics ==
Ethnic groups in Sungai Ruan (2010)
Ethnicity	Percent
Chinese	79.0%
Malay & Bumiputra	12.0%
Indian	3.0%
Non-citizens	6.0%

=== Religion ===
Most Raubian worshipers are Guanyin Bodhisattvas and almost each of the villages in the Raub district has a Guanyin temple with its own characteristics.

Some of the old temples have been rebuilt or renovated, attracting tourists coming to visit and worship.

=== Education ===
- 2 Preschools
- 1 Primary School (known as S.J.K (C) Sungai Ruan)
- 1 Secondary School (known as SMK Sungai Ruan)

1948
In 1948, villagers are focused on education for their children and built a Primary School
(Sekolah Jenis Kebangsaan (C) Sungai Ruan; known as S.J.K (C) Sungai Ruan).
After the completion of Primary School, it started with only 58 students.

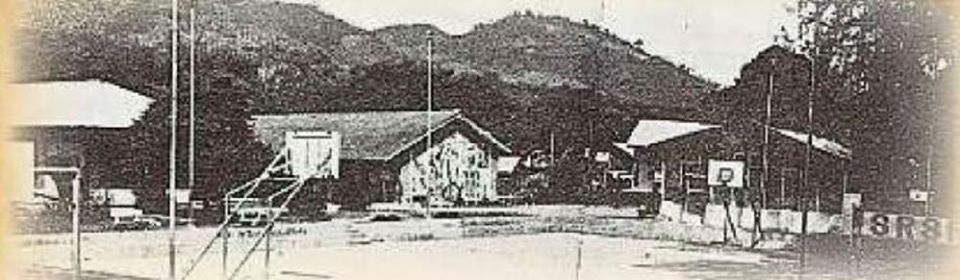
1960s SMK Sungai Ruan.

1965 – 1969
Secondary School was originally the original site of Primary School (known as S.J.K (C) Sungai Ruan). Secondary School was opened in 1965, three years later, the Ministry of Education sent a letter to the Primary School (known as S.J.K (C) Sungai Ruan) requesting land borrowing. The board of directors also agreed.

They further set up a Secondary School known as Sekolah Menengah Kebangsaan Sungai Ruan (abbr. SMK Sungai Ruan) with Mr Leong Weng Kee as the first headmaster.

Among six villages (Kampung Sungai Klau, Kampung Baru Sungai Chalit, Kampung Baru Hulu Gali, Kampung Tok Macang, Kampung Sempalit Tok Lubuk and Lembah Klau) in Raub, Sungai Ruan is the only one village that has a Secondary School (known as SMK Sungai Ruan).

In early 1969, a new building for Secondary School (known as SMK Sungai Ruan) was completed and used for six classes with a principal office, a teacher's room, a science laboratory, two household science rooms and a canteen.

1970s
In early 1970s, the number of students increased to 255 in eight classes, with a common field for both Primary School (known as S.J.K (C) Sungai Ruan) and Secondary School (known as SMK Sungai Ruan).

In 1974, the Parents and Teachers Association (PTA) was established and headed by Mr Low Hoy.

1997
In 1997, Secondary School (known as SMK Sungai Ruan) Form 4 and Form 5 were created. Increasing the number of students allows this school to be upgraded from Grade B School to Grade A School.

2000–present
In 2009, Secondary School (known as SMK Sungai Ruan) had 366 of male students and 343 of female students, bringing the total number of students to 709. And it had a total of 54 teachers.

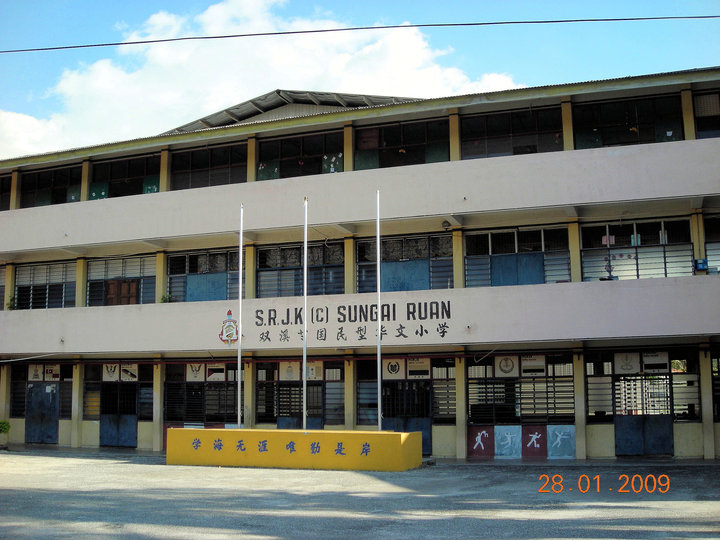
Primary school Sekolah Jenis Kebangsaan (C) Sungai Ruan.

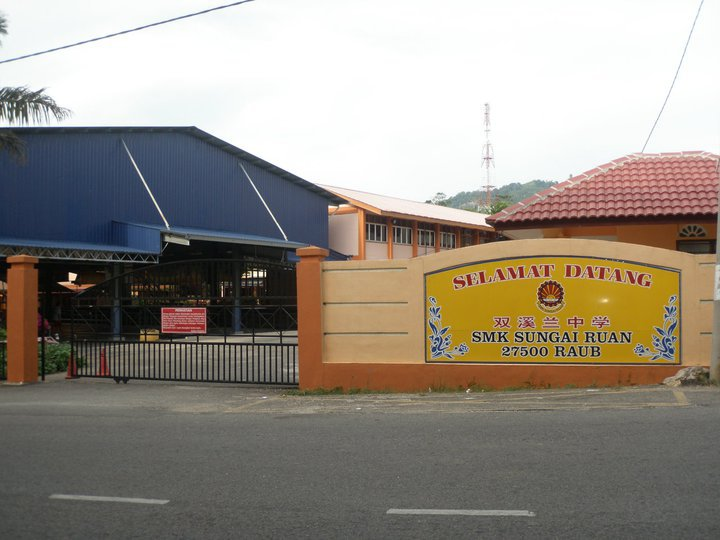
Secondary school SMK Sungai Ruan.

=== Sport ===
Popular sports in Sungai Ruan include association badminton and basketball.
Basketball is the most popular sport in Primary School (known as S.J.K (C) Sungai Ruan) even in Secondary School (known as SMK Sungai Ruan).

Honours
Raub District
Primary School - S.J.K (C) Sungai Ruan

- Basketball (Male)
  - Winner: 2016, 2019
  - Runner-up: 2018
- Basketball (Female)
  - Winner: 2016, 2019
  - Runner-up: 2018

Raub District
Secondary School - SMK Sungai Ruan

- Basketball (Male)
  - Winner: 2017
  - Runner-up: 2016
- Basketball (Female)
  - Runner-up: 2016
- Volleyball (Male)
  - Winner: 2014, 2016, 2017, 2018, 2019
- Volleyball (Female)
  - Winner: 2014, 2015, 2016, 2017, 2018, 2019
- School Beautification Projects
  - Winner: 2013
  - 2nd runner-up (third place): 2012

== Culture ==
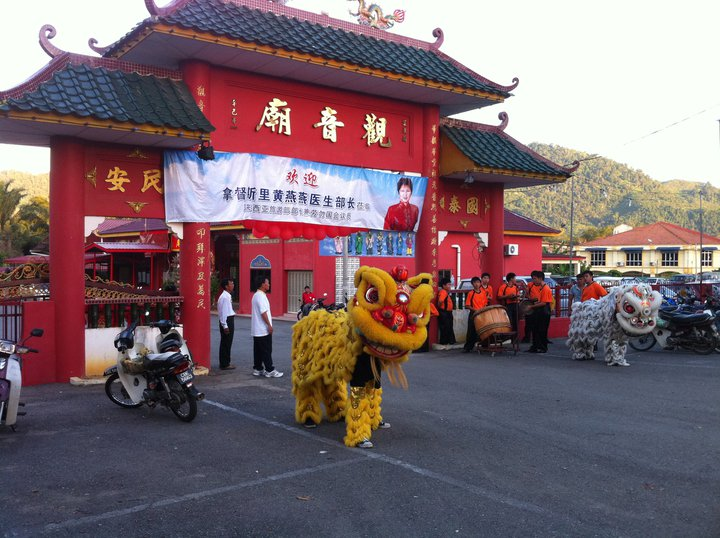
Lion dancer in Guanyin Buddhist temple Sungai Ruan.

=== Festivals ===
During the Chinese New Year in Sungai Ruan, lion dance troupes from Chinese martial art schools, guilds and associations visit the houses and shops of the Chinese community to perform traditional custom of "cai ching" (採青).

Literally means "plucking the greens", a quest by the 'lion' to pluck auspicious lettuce tied to a "red envelope" containing money, either hung highly or placed on a table in front of the premises.

Like a curious cat, the "lion" dances, approaches and eats the "greens", peels oranges and arranges them into an auspicious character while keeping the "red envelope".

The lion dance is believed to bring good luck and fortune to the business and the troupe is rewarded with the "red envelope".

Fireworks are a classic element of Chinese New Year celebrations and celebrate in Sungai Ruan every year.

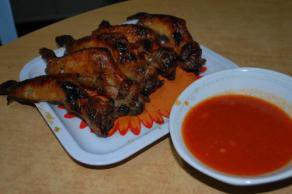
BBQ chicken wings in Sungai Ruan.

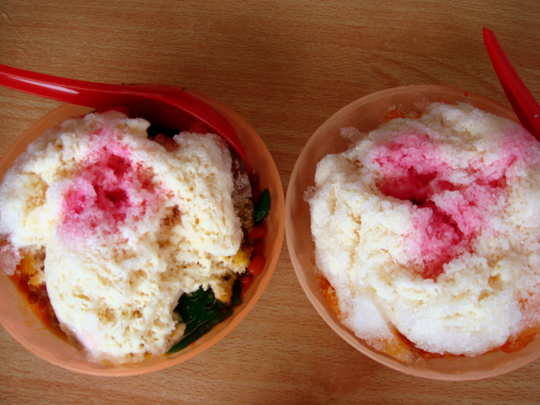
Ais Kacang.

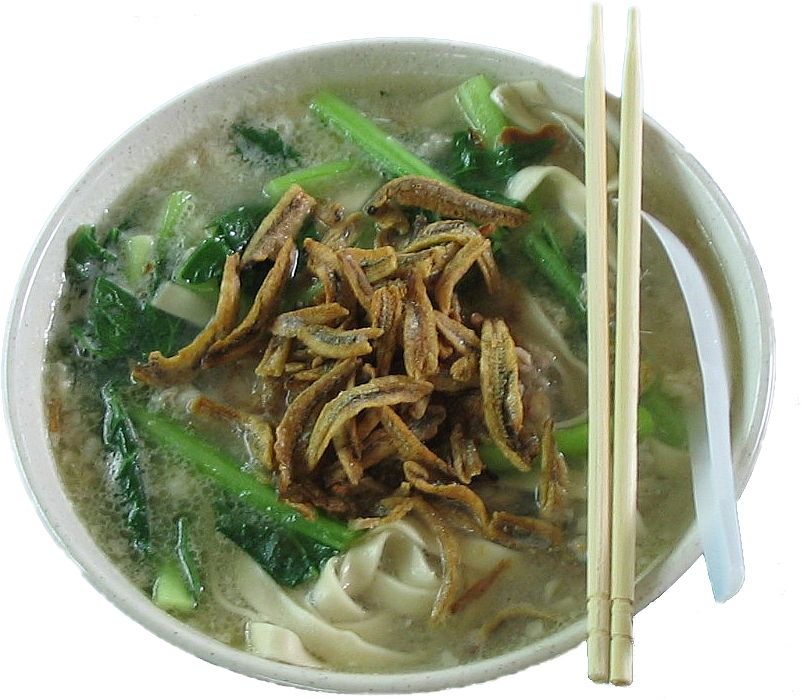
Handmade Banmian (手工板面).

=== Cuisine ===
- BBQ Chicken Wing – Among the local dishes is Sungai Ruan Chicken Wing (Chinese: 雙溪蘭燒雞翼) that is well known throughout the Raub town.
- Nasi Lemak – local cuisine and sell at Sg. Ruan Economy noodle shop (Sg. Ruan 酿料经济粉).
- ABC – ABC is an abbreviation for Air Batu Campur, or known as Ice Kacang Sungai Ruan, a dessert created from shaved ice added with corn, jelly, redbeans, groundnut, syrup, pasteurised milk, and liquid chocolate.
- Satay – a popular food in Malaysia and made from marinated meat or chicken and burnt on a charcoal grill. Grilled satay is dipped in special peanut sauce.
- Char kway teow (Chinese: 炒粿條，炒河粉) – stir fried rice noodles with prawns, pork or chicken, eggs, chives and beansprouts, usually optional cockles.
- Wantan Noodle (Chinese: 雲吞麵) – Chinese noodles with Chinese dumplings (Chinese : 雲吞), chooi sam and BBQ pork. Dumplings are usually made of Pork and/or prawns. The noodles may be served either in a bowl of soup with dumplings or on a plate with some dark soya sauce flavoured with oil and slices of roast pork and vegetables. For the latter, the dumplings will be served in a separate bowl with soup.
- Hokkien Mee (Chinese: 福建麵) – a dish of thick yellow noodles fried in thick black soy sauce and pork lard which has been fried until crispy. This dish is served mostly in Kuala Lumpur, Seremban, Klang, Kuantan and Penang.
- Chicken Rice (Chinese : 雞飯) – steamed chicken served with rice cooked in margarine, chicken fat, chicken stock or chicken soup.
- Banmian (Chinese: 板面) – made using a hand-operated machine in a stall which forms noodles from the dough. The dish is served in soup, usually with pieces of minced chicken or minced pork, ikan bilis (anchovies), vegetables, eggs, sliced mushrooms and fish balls.
- Doufuhua (Chinese: 豆腐花) – a Chinese dessert made with very soft tofu. It is also referred to as tofu pudding and soybean pudding.
- Red Beans and Wheat Porridge (Chinese: 红豆加麦粥) – new flavours, mixing the red beans soup and wheat porridge. Interestingly, the tastes of both will not cancel out tastes of each another.

== Tourism ==
Notable sites in the area include:

- Resort Rock Mountain
- Resort Lembah Temir
- Musang King Durian Leisure Farm (廷叔猫山王休闲果园)
- Guanyin Buddhist Temple Sungai Ruan
- Night Market, known as "Pasar Malam". opening 5 pm to 9 pm (Saturday)
- Morning Market, known as "Pasar Pagi". opening 6 am to 11 am (Tuesday)
- Gua Kechil, near Jalan Pindu Padang (Ulu Gali)
- Forest Jarum (Lata Jarum Ulu Dong)
- Lata Berembun Waterfall (Sungai Klau)
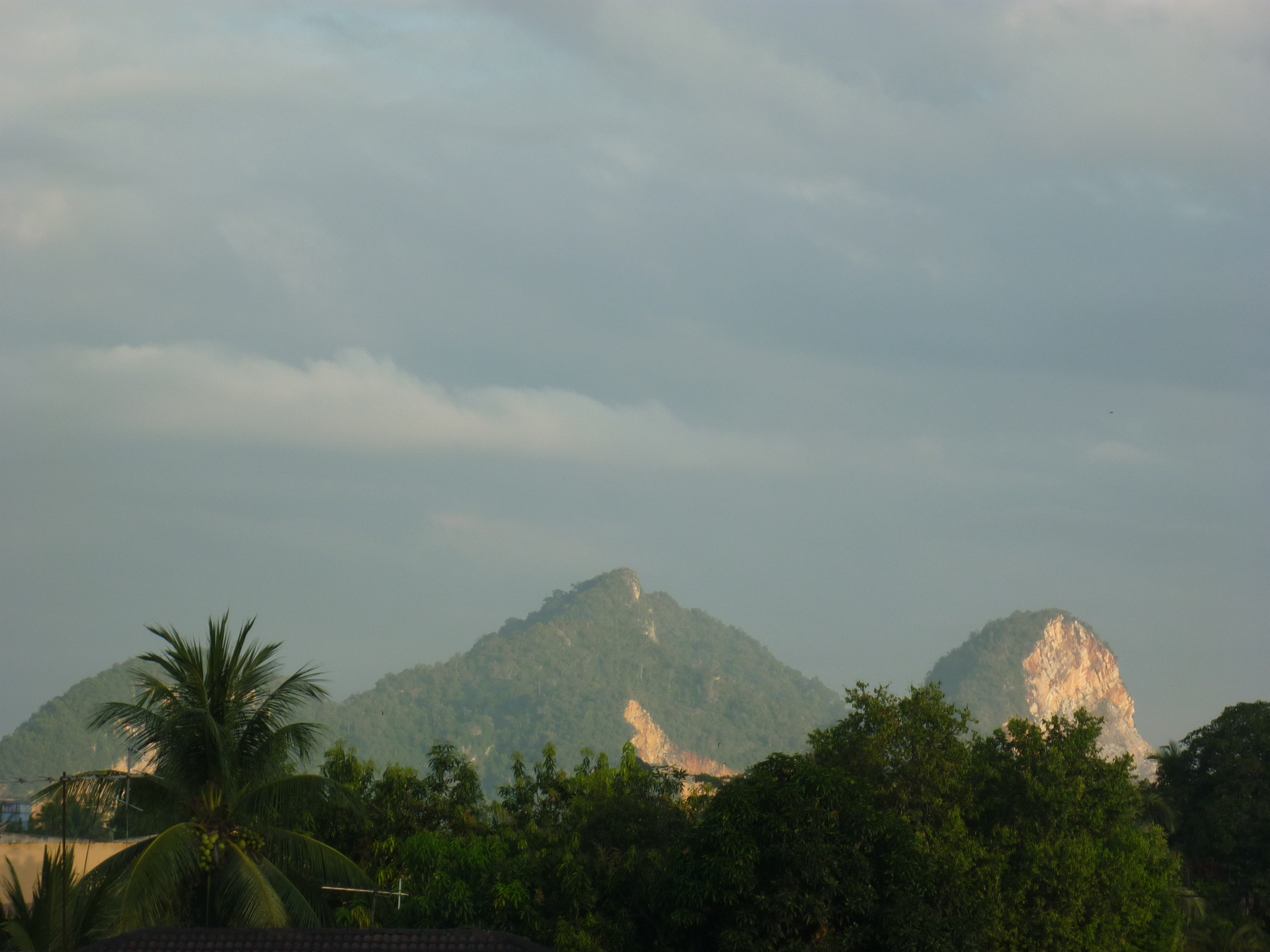
The rock at the entrance of the cave that resembled a lion, hence the name Gua Kechil nearby Sungai Ruan.

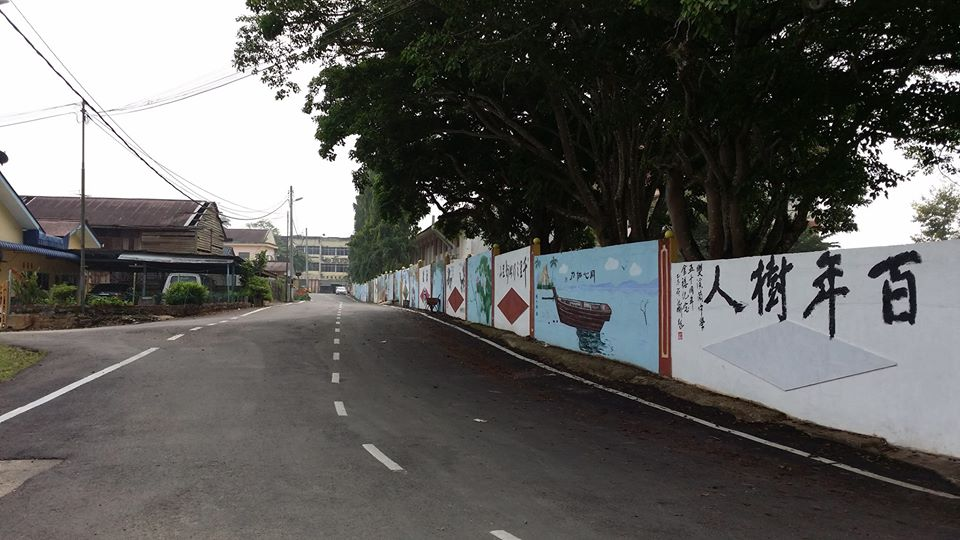
Street art in Sungai Ruan.

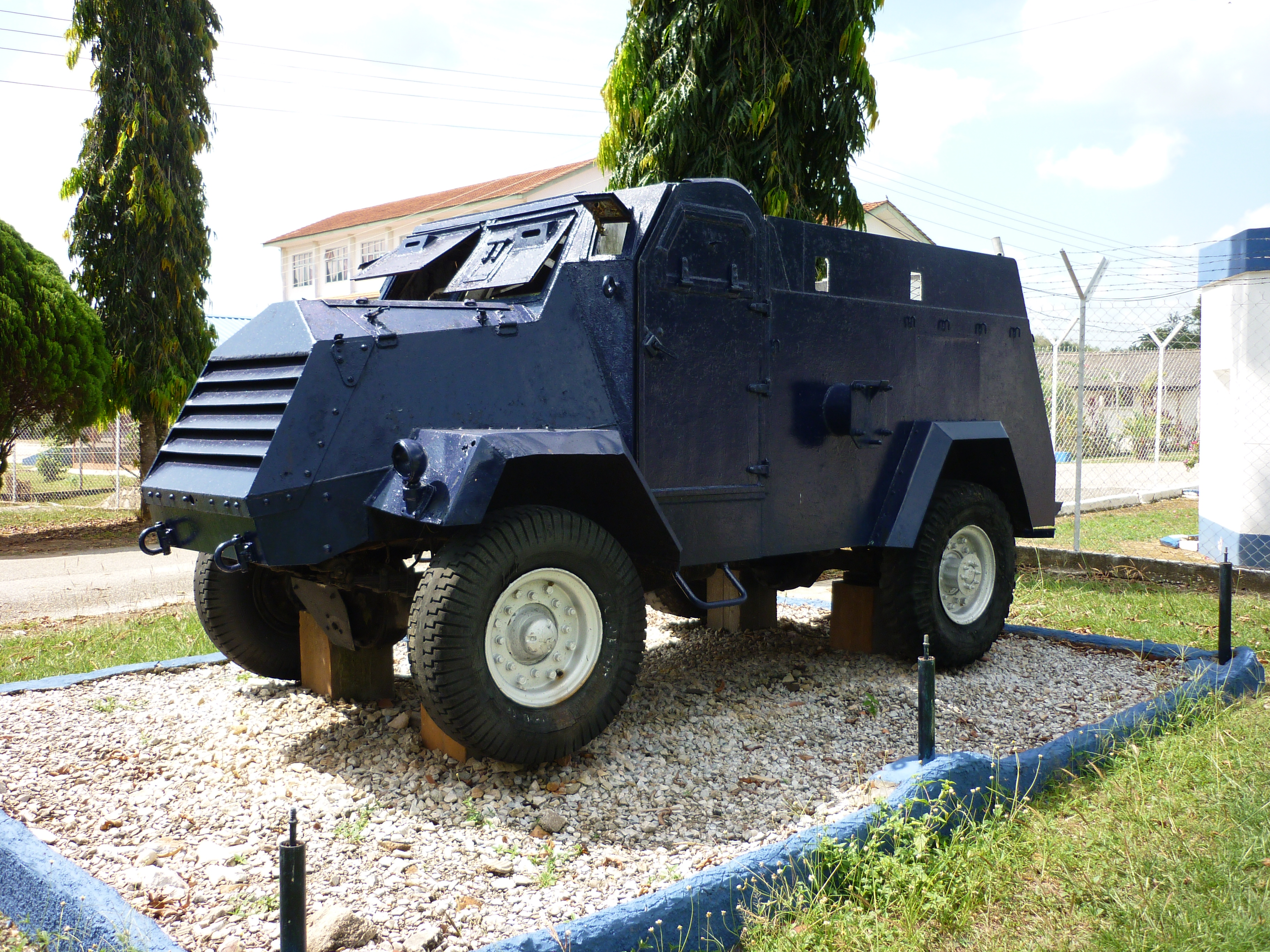
A historical police car in Sungai Ruan.

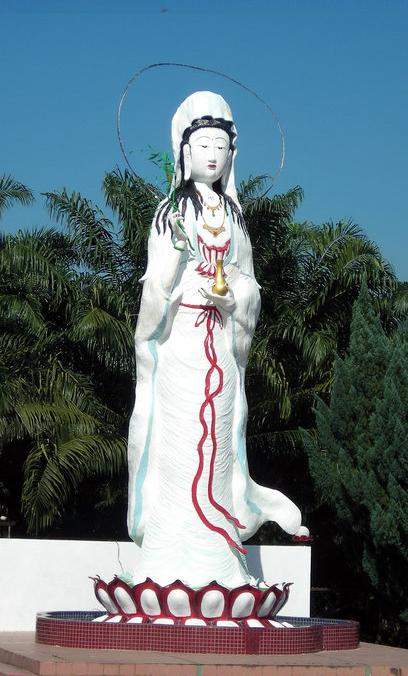
Guanyin statue in Sungai Ruan Guanyin temple.

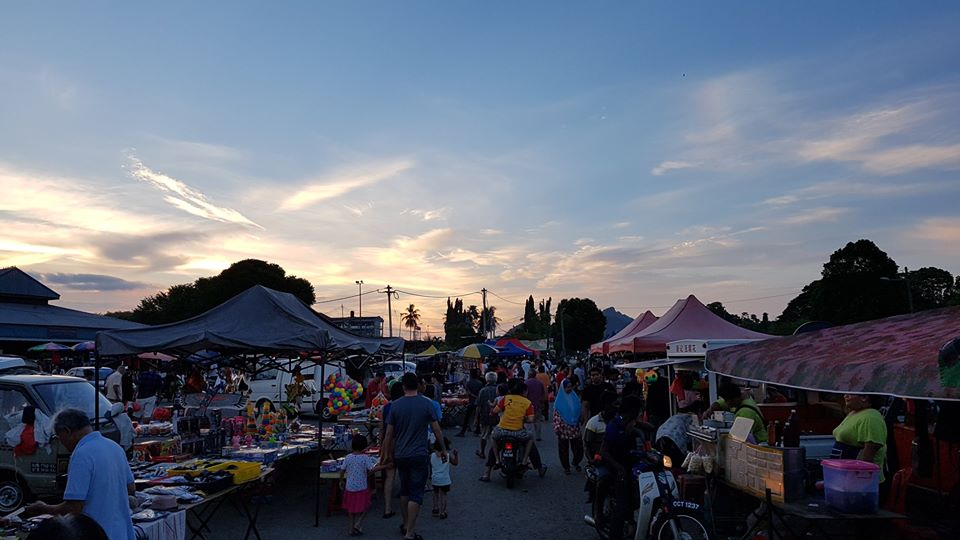
Night Market in Sungai Ruan. - opening 5 pm to 9 pm (Saturday).

== Climate ==
The temperature of Sungai Ruan seldom rises over 37 °C (98.6 °F) in the daytime, and it can drop to as low as 17 °C (62.6 °F) at nighttime during a year.

== Honours of village ==
Raub District

- Raub Volleyball Championship U18 (Female)
  - 1st runner-up (second place): 2015
- Raub Volleyball Championship U18 (Male)
  - Winner: 2015

Malaysia Country

- District Happiness ranking in Malaysia 2013 (幸福指数)
  - 2nd runner-up (third place): 2013
- Village Beautification Projects
  - 1st runner-up (second place): 1994
  - 2nd runner-up (third place): 1993

== Gallery ==
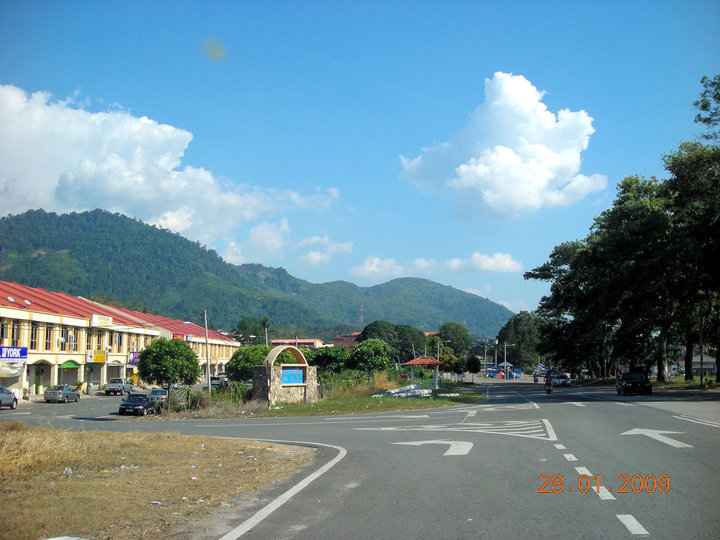
Sungai Ruan main street.

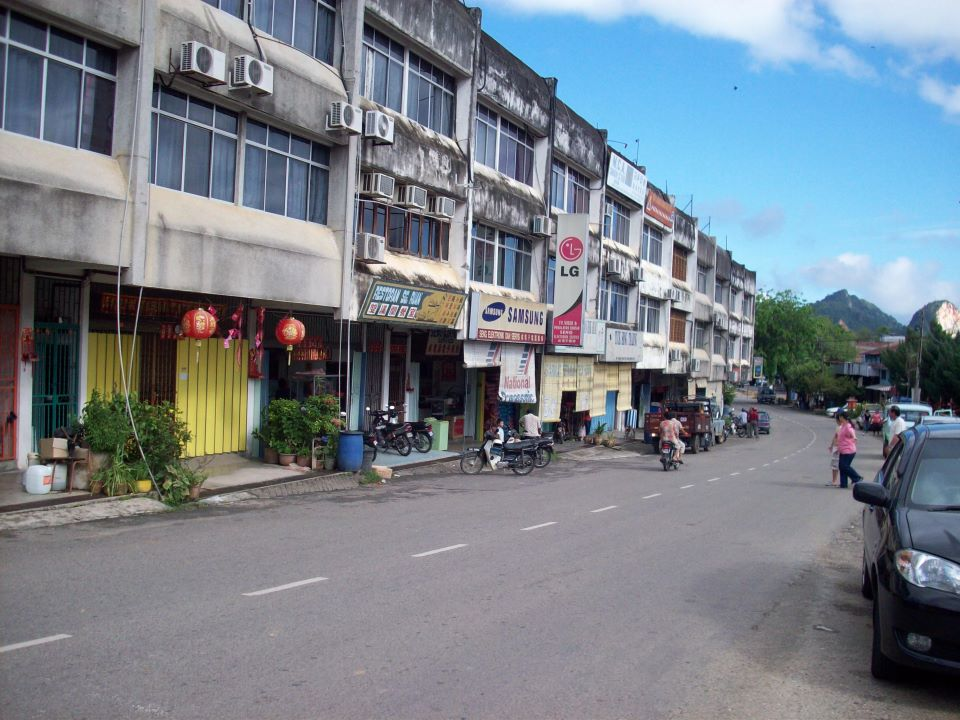
Sungai Ruan main street.

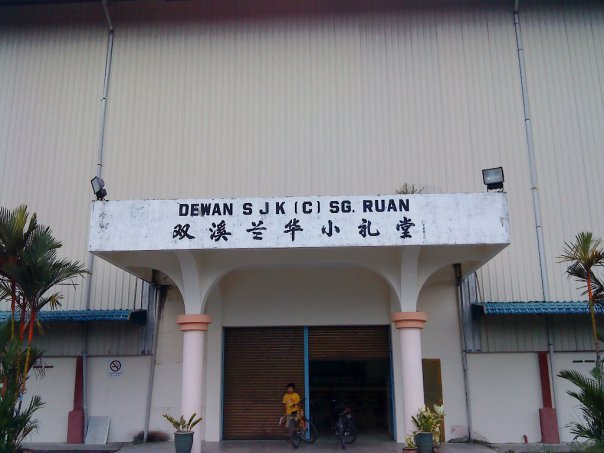
Primary school Sekolah Jenis Kebangsaan (C) Sungai Ruan Assembly Hall.

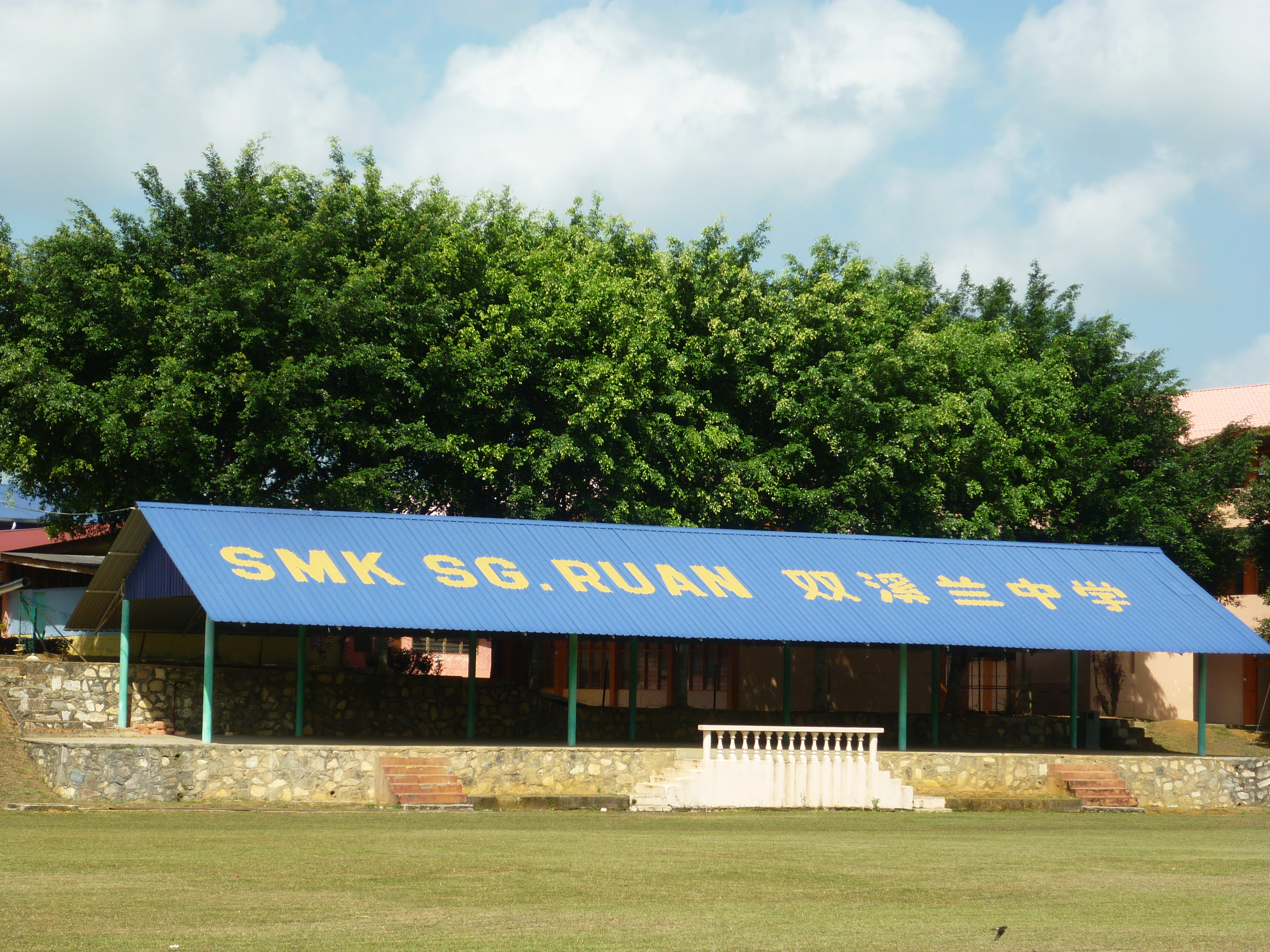
Secondary school SMK Sungai Ruan.

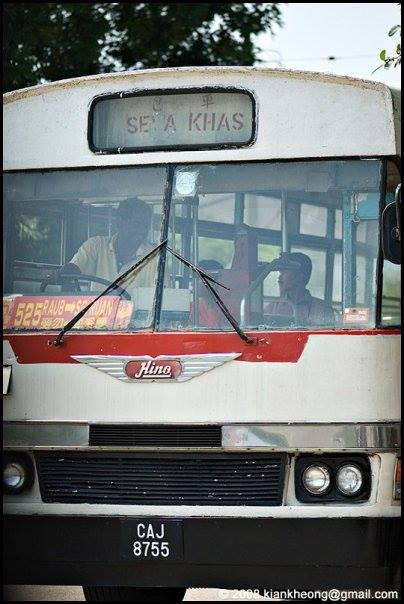
Lin Siong Bus (Raub - Sungai Ruan) end service in 2020.

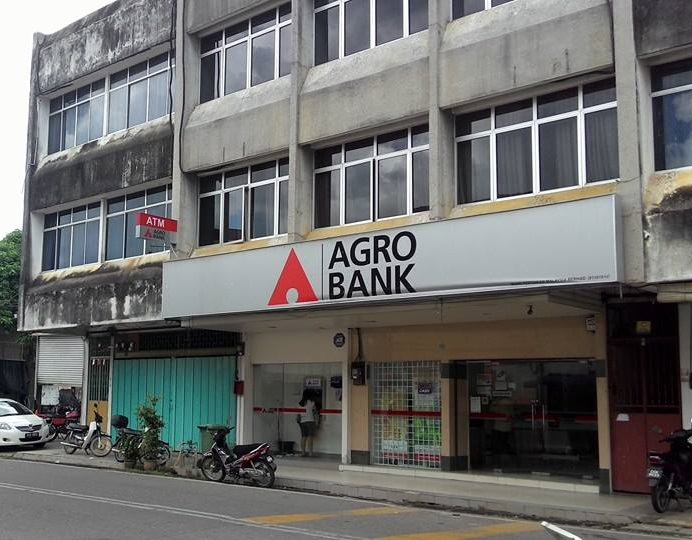
Bank Pertanian Malaysia Berhad (Agrobank) - Sungai Ruan.

== See also ==
- List of Malaysian dishes
- List of national fruits
