= 2007 Batu Talam by-election =

Election in Malaysia

- 28 January 2007

Batu Talam seat in the Pahang State Legislative Assembly
| | BN | IND |
| Candidate | Abdul Aziz Mat Kiram | Ng Chee Pang |
| Party | BN (UMNO) | Independent |
| Popular vote | 6,276 | 419 |
| Percentage | 93.74% | 6.26% |
Batu Talam assemblyman before election
Tengku Paris Tengku Razlan
BN (UMNO)
Elected Batu Talam assemblyman
Abdul Aziz Mat Kiram
BN (UMNO)

The Batu Talam by-election was held on 28 January 2007. The seat of Batu Talam in the state assembly of Pahang, Malaysia, fell vacant after the death of the incumbent, Tengku Paris Tengku Razlan of the United Malays National Organisation (UMNO), the leading party of the ruling Barisan Nasional. Nominations were held on 16 January, with two candidates filing to contest — Abdul Aziz Mat Kiram of UMNO, and independent candidate Ng Chee Pang.

== Background ==
The incumbent, Tengku Paris, died in December 2006. He had won the seat in the 2004 general election, defeating PAS candidate Mohamed Nilam Abdul Manap with 5,414 to 2,653 votes. As of nomination day for the by-election, the constituency had 10,511 registered voters, with an ethnic composition of 73% Malay, 14% Chinese, and 13% Indian or Orang Asli. There were a total of 14 registered postal voters.

Batu Talam thus became the one of constituency in Malaysia to have had more than one by-election . The first was held after the 1993 death of Mazlan Idris, who was murdered by the "bomoh" (witch doctor) Mona Fandey. Mazlan was succeeded by Syed Ali Syed Mohamad, who held the post until 1999.

PAS and Parti Keadilan Rakyat (PKR) of the opposition Barisan Alternatif (Alternative Front) declined to field a candidate for the by-election, citing irregularities in the electoral roll and other alleged "dirty tactics" meant to favour the government. The Democratic Action Party (DAP) also stated that it was not interested in participating.

== Nominations ==
Despite initial appearances of a government walkover on nomination day, Ng Chee Pang filed to contest the seat as an independent candidate. His candidacy was the subject of much interest, as although the DAP had claimed it did not intend to participate, Ng was the son of DAP Pahang treasurer, Ng Kwi Ling. Ng Kwi Ling and DAP Secretary-General Lim Guan Eng both denied allegations that Ng was a secret DAP candidate, insisting that the DAP would not campaign for him. However, state DAP leader Lee Tuck Chee said that although the DAP would not campaign for Ng, the party would open an operations base in Cheroh, a town with a high concentration of Chinese voters.

Najib Tun Razak, the Deputy Prime Minister, suggested that Ng was "supported by the opposition. They claim they are boycotting the by-election but they have instructed support for the independent candidate". Pahang Barisan Nasional (BN) Youth Chief Liow Tiong Lai told the press that the move was a ploy to attract support from a broad spectrum of opposition voters, as although PAS supporters would not vote for a DAP candidate and vice versa, both sides would have no issues with voting for an independent candidate.

Ng stated that his motivation for contesting the election was "to follow in the footsteps of my father" and "fulfil his ambition of winning an election" — Ng Kwi Ling had contested in six general elections since 1982, losing in all of them. Ng, a 22-year-old businessman, also said that he intended to help petty traders like himself if he won.

== Results ==
Polling took place on 28 January as scheduled. The result was an increased margin of victory for the Barisan Nasional candidate.

Pahang state by-election, 28 January 2007: Batu Talam Upon the death of incumbent, Tengku Paris Tengku Razlan
| Party | Candidate | Votes | % | ∆% |
|---|---|---|---|---|
| BN | Abdul Aziz Mat Kiram | 6,276 | 93.74 | |
| Independent | Ng Chee Pang | 419 | 6.26 | |
| Total valid votes | | 6,695 | 100.00 | |
| Total rejected ballots | | 385 | | |
| Unreturned ballots | | | | |
| Turnout | | 7,080 | 67.36 | |
| Registered electors | | 10,511 | | |
| Majority | | 5,857 | | |
| BN hold | | Swing | | |
