= Sempalit =

Malaysian village in Raub District, Pahang

Sempalit is a village in Raub District, Pahang, Malaysia, along Highway 8 towards Kuala Lipis. It is one of the largest village in Raub. This part of village are classified between Kampung Melayu Sempalit and Sempalit Cina. It is separated by one river, called Sungai Sempalit. This village was established as part of the “Briggs Plan” during the period of Emergency in Malaya, a few years after World War II

Other residential places inside Sempalit Cina:

1. Taman Emas
2. Taman Sempalit Baru
3. Fook Loong (Taman Aman)
4. Ming Xing Ling (Taman Sri Raub)

The market is the most popular market over the Sempalit Villageship. Its popularity is even higher than the town's official market. Tong Fatt supermarket is little more than 10 meters from Sempalit. Tong Fatt supermarket. The location was previously a sawmill factory called "Yong Foh". Raub Bakery is also in Taman Emas and supplies most of the bread in Raub.
