= Batu Talam (state constituency) =

Political subdivision in Malaysia

Batu Talam (N06)
Pahang constituency

State constituency
- Legislature: Pahang State Legislative Assembly
MLA
Abd. Aziz Mat Kiram
BN
- Constituency created: 1974
- First contested: 1974
- Last contested: 2022

Demographics
- Electors (2022): 19,683

Batu Talam is a state constituency in Pahang, Malaysia, that has been represented in the Pahang State Legislative Assembly.

== Demographics ==
Ethnic breakdown of Batu Talam's electorate as of 2022
1. Malay (76.3%)
2. Other ethnicities (11.3%)
3. Chinese (8.21%)
4. Indian (4.15%)

== History ==
=== Polling districts ===
According to the federal gazette issued on 31 October 2022, the Batu Talam constituency is divided into 12 polling districts.

State constituency	Polling district	Code	Location
Batu Talam（N06）	Hulu Atok	080/06/01	SK Ulu Atok
Batu Talam（N06）	Atok	080/06/02	SK Kuala Atok
Batu Talam（N06）	Sega	080/06/03	SK Sega
Batu Talam（N06）	Chenua	080/60/04	SK Chenua
Batu Talam（N06）	Kundang Patah	080/06/05	SK Kundang Patah
Batu Talam（N06）	Cheroh	080/06/06	SJK (C) Cheroh
Batu Talam（N06）	Hulu Sungai	080/06/07	SK Ulu Sungai
Batu Talam（N06）	FELDA Tersang Tiga	080/06/08	SK (LKTP) Tersang 3
Batu Talam（N06）	FELDA Tersang Dua	080/06/09	SMK (LKTP) Tersang
Batu Talam（N06）	FELDA Tersang Satu	080/06/10	SK LKTP Tersang 1
Batu Talam（N06）	Batu Malim	080/06/11	Balai Raya Batu Malim
Batu Talam（N06）	Batu Talam	080/06/12	SMA Al-Falah

=== Representation history ===
Members of the Legislative Assembly for Batu Talam
Assembly	No	Years	Name	Party
Constituency created from Dong and Tras
4th	N14	1974-1978	Abdul Rahman Ismail	BN (UMNO)
5th	N14	1978-1982	Abdul Razak Hitam	BN (UMNO)
6th	N14	1982-1986	Abdul Razak Hitam	BN (UMNO)
7th	N06	1986-1990	Mohamed Mazlan Idris	BN (UMNO)
8th	N06	1990-1993	Mohamed Mazlan Idris	BN (UMNO)
8th	N06	1993-1995	Syed Ali Syed Mohammad	BN (UMNO)
9th	N06	1995-1999	Syed Ali Syed Mohammad	BN (UMNO)
10th	N06	1999-2004	Tengku Paris Tengku Razlan	BN (UMNO)
11th	N06	2004-2006	Tengku Paris Tengku Razlan	BN (UMNO)
11th	N06	2006-2008	Abd. Aziz Mat Kiram	BN (UMNO)
12th	N06	2008-2013	Abd. Aziz Mat Kiram	BN (UMNO)
13th	N06	2013-2018	Abd. Aziz Mat Kiram	BN (UMNO)
14th	N06	2018-2022	Abd. Aziz Mat Kiram	BN (UMNO)
15th	N06	2022-present	Abd. Aziz Mat Kiram	BN (UMNO)

== Election results ==
Pahang state election, 2022
Party	Candidate	Votes	%	∆%
BN	Abd. Aziz Mat Kiram	7,992	52.98	▼4.87
PN	Ahmad Sabri Mat Dui	5,123	33.96	▲33.96
PH	Shahuddin Abdul Rahman	1,969	13.05	▲13.05
Total valid votes		15,084	100.00	
Total rejected ballots		256		
Unreturned ballots		32		
Turnout		15,372	78.10	▼3.29
Registered electors		19,683		
Majority		2,869	19.02	▼17.09
BN hold		Swing		

Pahang state election, 2018
Party	Candidate	Votes	%	∆%
BN	Abd. Aziz Mat Kiram	6,922	57.85	▼10.03
PAS	Tengku Abdul Rahman Tengku Ja'afar	2,602	21.75	▲21.75
PKR	Dasimah Zainudin	2,441	20.40	▼11.72
Total valid votes		11,965	100.00	
Total rejected ballots		347		
Unreturned ballots		50		
Turnout		12,362	81.39	▼3.38
Registered electors		15,188		
Majority		4,320	36.11	▲0.34
BN hold		Swing		
Source(s) "Pahang - 14th General Election Malaysia (GE14 / PRU14)". The Star.

Pahang state election, 2013
Party	Candidate	Votes	%	∆%
BN	Abd. Aziz Mat Kiram	7,852	67.88	▲4.24
PKR	Khairul Mohd Ali	3,715	32.12	▲32.12
Total valid votes		11,567	100.00	
Total rejected ballots		284		
Unreturned ballots		31		
Turnout		11,882	84.77	▲5.77
Registered electors		14,016		
Majority		4,137	35.77	▲8.47
BN hold		Swing		

Pahang state election, 2008
Party	Candidate	Votes	%	∆%
BN	Abd. Aziz Mat Kiram	5,632	63.65	▼30.10
PAS	Abdullah Suhaimin Sa'at	3,217	36.35	▲36.35
Total valid votes		8,849	100.00	
Total rejected ballots		202		
Unreturned ballots		35		
Turnout		9,086	79.00	▲11.69
Registered electors		11,501		
Majority		2,415	27.29	▼60.19
BN hold		Swing		

Pahang state by-election, 28 January 2007 Upon the death of the incumbent, Tengku Paris Tengku Razlan
Party	Candidate	Votes	%	∆%
BN	Abd. Aziz Mat Kiram	6,276	93.74	▲26.63
Independent	Ng Chee Pang	419	6.26	▲6.26
Total valid votes		6,695	100.00	
Total rejected ballots		385		
Unreturned ballots		5		
Turnout		7,085	67.32	▼9.27
Registered electors		10,525		
Majority		5,857	87.48	▲53.26
BN hold		Swing		

Pahang state election, 2004
Party	Candidate	Votes	%	∆%
BN	Tengku Paris Tengku Razlan	5,414	67.11	▲12.39
PAS	Mohamed Nilam Abdul Manap	2,653	32.89	▼12.39
Total valid votes		8,067	100.00	
Total rejected ballots		238		
Unreturned ballots		17		
Turnout		8,322	76.59	▲1.19
Registered electors		10,866		
Majority		2,761	34.23	▲24.79
BN hold		Swing		

Pahang state election, 1999
Party	Candidate	Votes	%	∆%
BN	Tengku Paris Tengku Razlan	4,353	54.72	▼17.11
PAS	Mohamed Nilam Abdul Manap	3,602	45.28	▲17.11
Total valid votes		7,955	100.00	
Total rejected ballots		239		
Unreturned ballots		14		
Turnout		8,208	75.39	▲2.29
Registered electors		10,887		
Majority		751	9.44	▼34.22
BN hold		Swing		

Pahang state election, 1995
Party	Candidate	Votes	%	∆%
BN	Syed Ali Syed Mohammad	5,316	71.83	▲2.46
PAS	Abdullah Suhaimin Sa'at	2,085	28.17	▼2.46
Total valid votes		7,401	100.00	
Total rejected ballots		175		
Unreturned ballots		0		
Turnout		7,576	73.10	▲4.47
Registered electors		10,364		
Majority		3,231	43.66	▲4.93
BN hold		Swing		

Pahang state by-election, 28 March 1993 Upon the death of the incumbent, Mohamad Mazlan Idris
Party	Candidate	Votes	%	∆%
BN	Syed Ali Syed Mohammad	5,355	69.37	▲6.73
PAS	Raja Puji Tengku Abdul Hamid	2,365	30.63	▼6.73
Total valid votes		7,720	100.00	
Total rejected ballots		109		
Unreturned ballots		9		
Turnout		7,838	68.63	▼4.45
Registered electors		11,421		
Majority		2,990	38.73	▲13.46
BN hold		Swing		

Pahang state election, 1990
Party	Candidate	Votes	%	∆%
BN	Mohamad Mazlan Idris	4,908	62.63	▼7.19
PAS	Raja Puji Tengku Abdul Hamid	2,928	37.37	▲7.19
Total valid votes		7,836	100.00	
Total rejected ballots		375		
Unreturned ballots		4		
Turnout		8,215	73.08	▲3.90
Registered electors		11,241		
Majority		1,980	25.27	▼14.39
BN hold		Swing		

Pahang state election, 1986
Party	Candidate	Votes	%	∆%
BN	Mohamad Mazlan Idris	4,830	69.83	▼5.76
PAS	Tengku Yusop Tengku Adbdul Hamid	2,087	30.17	▲5.76
Total valid votes		6,917	100.00	
Total rejected ballots		386		
Unreturned ballots		0		
Turnout		7,303	69.18	▼4.98
Registered electors		10,556		
Majority		2,743	39.66	▼11.51
BN hold		Swing		

Pahang state election, 1982
Party	Candidate	Votes	%	∆%
BN	Abdul Razak Hitam	4,665	75.58	▲9.76
PAS	Syed Ibrahim Syed Abd.Rahman	1,507	24.42	▼9.76
Total valid votes		6,172	100.00	
Total rejected ballots		245		
Unreturned ballots		0		
Turnout		6,417	74.16	▼3.65
Registered electors		8,653		
Majority		3,158	51.17	▲19.52
BN hold		Swing		

Pahang state election, 1978
Party	Candidate	Votes	%	∆%
BN	Abdul Razak Hitam	3,488	65.82	▼7.68
PAS	Raja Puji Tengku Abdul Hamid	1,811	34.18	▲34.18
Total valid votes		5,299	100.00	
Total rejected ballots		433		
Unreturned ballots		0		
Turnout		5,732	77.81	▼0.10
Registered electors		7,367		
Majority		1,677	31.65	▼15.37
BN hold		Swing		

Pahang state election, 1974
Party	Candidate	Votes	%
BN	Abdul Rahman Ismail	3,213	73.51
Parti Rakyat Malaysia	Syed Shahir Syed Mohamud	1,158	26.49
Total valid votes		4,371	100.00
Total rejected ballots		538	
Unreturned ballots		0	
Turnout		4,909	77.91
Registered electors		6,301	
Majority		2,055	47.01
This was a new constituency created.
