= Cheroh =

Village in Raub District, Pahang, Malaysia

- Village
- Interactive map of Cheroh
- Coordinates: 3°54′37.12″N 101°48′40.81″E
- Country: Malaysia
- State: Pahang
- District: Raub District

Area
  - Total: 1.050 km^{2} (0.405 sq mi)

Population (2020)
  - Total: 2,221
  - Density: 2,114/km^{2} (5,480/sq mi)

Cheroh is a small village in the north of Raub District, Pahang, Malaysia, with a population of about 2,221 people in a 2020 census. Agriculture is the main occupation. It is demographically 51.6% (1,146) male and 48.4% (1,075) female. There is a golf course located 1.5 km before the village from the direction of Raub.

Schools in Cheroh:

- SRJK(C) Cheroh
- SRJC(T) Cheroh
