= Minister of Home Affairs (Malaysia) =

Function in Malaysia

- Menteri Dalam Negeri

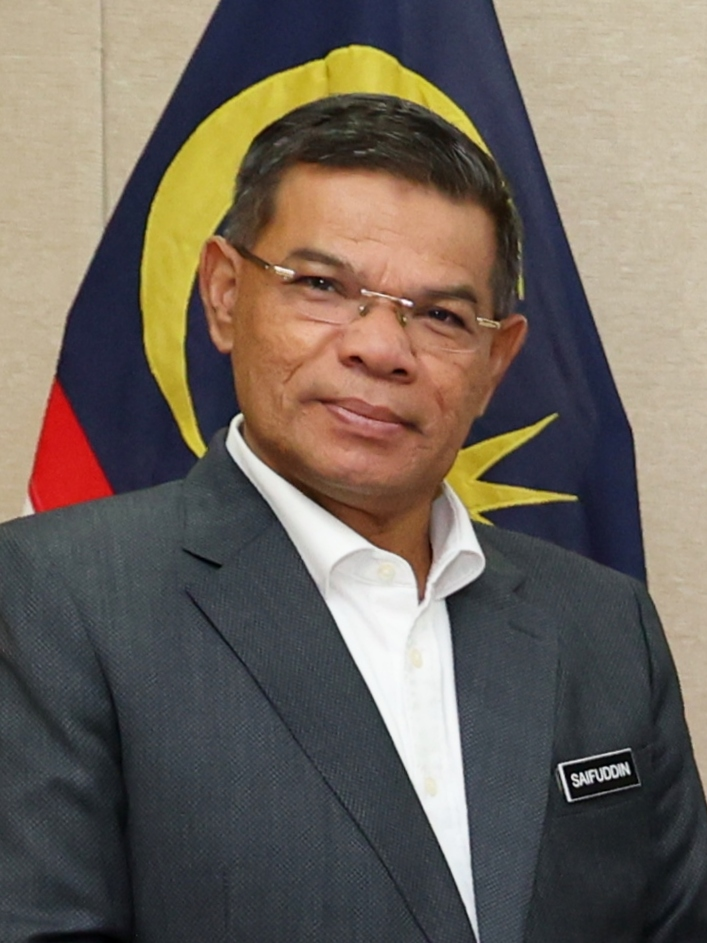
- Incumbent; Saifuddin Nasution Ismail since 3 December 2022
- Ministry of Home Affairs
- Style: Yang Berhormat Menteri (The Honourable Minister)
- Abbreviation: KDN
- Member of: Cabinet of Malaysia
- Reports to: Parliament of Malaysia
- Seat: Putrajaya
- Appointer: Yang di-Pertuan Agong on the recommendation of the Prime Minister of Malaysia
- Formation: 1955
- First holder: Tunku Abdul Rahman
- Deputy: Shamsul Anuar Nasarah
- Website: www.moha.gov.my

The current position for Malaysian Minister of Home Affairs (Malay: Menteri Dalam Negeri; Jawi: منتري دالم نڬري) is hold by Saifuddin Nasution Ismail since 3 December 2022. The minister is supported by the Deputy Ministers of Home Affairs, Shamsul Anuar Nasarah, since 17 December 2025. The Minister administers the portfolio through the Ministry of Home Affairs.

== List of ministers ==
=== Home affairs ===
The following individuals have been appointed as Minister of Home Affairs, or any of its precedent titles:

Political party: Alliance/BN PH PN

Portrait	Name (Birth–Death) Constituency	Political party	Title	Took office	Left office	Vacant	Prime Minister (Cabinet)
	Tunku Abdul Rahman (1903–1990); MP for Sungei Muda	Alliance (UMNO)	Minister of Home Affairs	9 August 1955	30 August 1957	Bahaman Samsuddin	Chief Minister of the Federation of Malaya; Tunku Abdul Rahman
	Ismail Abdul Rahman (1915–1973); MP for Johore Timor	Alliance (UMNO)	Minister of Home Affairs and Justice	1965	1 June 1967	Vacant	Tunku Abdul Rahman (III)
	Abdul Razak Hussein (1922–1976); MP for Pekan	Alliance (UMNO)	Minister of Home Affairs	1 June 1967	20 May 1969	Vacant	Tunku Abdul Rahman (III)
	Ismail Abdul Rahman (1915–1973) (Deputy Prime Minister); MP for Johore Timor	Alliance (UMNO)	Minister of Home Affairs	20 May 1969	2 August 1973	Vacant (1969–1970); Abdul Samad Idris (1970–1973)	Tunku Abdul Rahman (IV); Abdul Razak Hussein (I)
	Ghazali Shafie (1922–2010); MP for Lipis	BN (UMNO)	Minister of Home Affairs	13 August 1973	16 July 1981	Abdul Samad Idris (1973–1976); Shariff Ahmad (1976–1978); Rais Yatim (1978); Syed Ahmad Shahabuddin (1978–1981)	Abdul Razak Hussein (I • II); Hussein Onn (I • II)
	Musa Hitam (b. 1934) (Deputy Prime Minister); MP for Labis (1981); MP for Panti (1981-1986)	BN (UMNO)	Minister of Home Affairs	17 July 1981	16 March 1986	Sanusi Junid (1981–1982); Mohd Kassim Ahmad (1982–1984); Mohd Radzi Sheikh Ahmad (1984–1986)	Mahathir Mohamad (I • II)
	Mahathir Mohamad (Prime Minister) (b. 1925); MP for Kubang Pasu	BN (UMNO)	Minister of Home Affairs	17 March 1986	10 January 1999	Mohd Radzi Sheikh Ahmad (1986); Megat Junid Megat Ayub (1986–1997); Ong Ka Ting (1995–1999); Azmi Khalid (1997–1999)	Mahathir Mohamad (II · III ·• IV · V)
	Abdullah Ahmad Badawi (1939–2025) (Deputy Prime Minister) (Prime Minister); MP for Kepala Batas	BN (UMNO)	Minister of Home Affairs	14 January 1999	27 March 2004	Ong Ka Ting (1995–1999); Azmi Khalid (1997–1999); Zainal Abidin Zin (1999–2004)	Mahathir Mohamad (V • VI); Abdullah Ahmad Badawi (I)
	Azmi Khalid (b. 1940); MP for Padang Besar	BN (UMNO)	Minister of Home Affairs	27 March 2004	13 February 2006	Tan Chai Ho	Abdullah Ahmad Badawi (II)
	Mohd Radzi Sheikh Ahmad (b. 1942); MP for Kangar	BN (UMNO)	Minister of Home Affairs	14 February 2006	17 March 2008	Tan Chai Ho	Abdullah Ahmad Badawi (II)
	Syed Hamid Albar (b. 1944); MP for Kota Tinggi	BN (UMNO)	Minister of Home Affairs	18 March 2008	9 April 2009	Wan Ahmad Farid Wan Salleh; Chor Chee Heung	Abdullah Ahmad Badawi (III)
	Hishammuddin Hussein (b. 1961); MP for Sembrong	BN (UMNO)	Minister of Home Affairs	10 April 2009	20 April 2013	Abu Seman Yusop (2009–2013); Jelaing Mersat (2009–2010); Lee Chee Leong (2010–2013)	Najib Razak (I)
	Ahmad Zahid Hamidi (b. 1953) (Deputy Prime Minister); MP for Bagan Datok	BN (UMNO)	Minister of Home Affairs	16 May 2013	9 May 2018	Wan Junaidi Tuanku Jaafar (2013–2015); Nur Jazlan Mohamed (2015–2018); Masir Kujat (2015–2018)	Najib Razak (II)
	Muhyiddin Yassin (b. 1947); MP for Pagoh	PH (BERSATU)	Minister of Home Affairs	21 May 2018	24 February 2020	Azis Jamman	Mahathir Mohamad (VII)
	Hamzah Zainudin (b. 1957); MP for Larut	PN (BERSATU)	Minister of Home Affairs	10 March 2020	24 November 2022	Ismail Mohamed Said; Jonathan Yasin	Muhyiddin Yassin (I); Ismail Sabri Yaakob (I)
	Saifuddin Nasution Ismail (b. 1963); Senator	PH (PKR)	Minister of Home Affairs	3 December 2022	Incumbent	Shamsul Anuar Nasarah	Anwar Ibrahim (I)

=== Interior ===
The following individuals have been appointed as Minister of Interior, or any of its precedent titles:

Political party: Alliance/BN

Portrait	Name (Birth–Death) Constituency	Political party	Title	Took office	Left office	Deputy Minister	Prime Minister (Cabinet)
	Suleiman Abdul Rahman (1912–1963); MP for Muar Selatan	Alliance (UMNO)	Minister of Interior and Justice	31 August 1957	1959	Vacant	Tunku Abdul Rahman (I)
	Leong Yew Koh (1888–1963); Senator	Alliance (MCA)	Minister of Interior and Justice	1959	12 January 1963	Vacant	Tunku Abdul Rahman (II)
	Ismail Abdul Rahman (1915–1973); MP for Johore Timor	Alliance (UMNO)	Minister of Interior	1 August 1962	1965	Vacant	Tunku Abdul Rahman (II • III)

=== Justice ===
The following individuals have been appointed as Minister of Justice, or any of its precedent titles:

Political party: Alliance/BN

Portrait	Name (Birth–Death) Constituency	Political party	Title	Took office	Left office	Deputy Minister	Prime Minister (Cabinet)
	Suleiman Abdul Rahman (1912–1963); MP for Muar Selatan	Alliance (UMNO)	Minister of Interior and Justice	31 August 1957	1959	Vacant	Tunku Abdul Rahman (I)
	Leong Yew Koh (1888–1963); Senator	Alliance (MCA)	Minister of Interior and Justice	1959	12 January 1963	Vacant	Tunku Abdul Rahman (II)
	Ismail Abdul Rahman (1915–1973); MP for Johore Timor	Alliance (UMNO)	Minister of Justice	1964	1965	Vacant	Tunku Abdul Rahman (III)
	Ismail Abdul Rahman (1915–1973); MP for Johore Timor	Alliance (UMNO)	Minister of Home Affairs and Justice	1965	1 June 1967	Vacant	Tunku Abdul Rahman (III)
	Bahaman Samsudin (1906–1995); MP for Kuala Pilah	Alliance (UMNO)	Minister of Justice	1968	1969	Vacant	Tunku Abdul Rahman (III)
	Abdul Ghani Gilong (1932–2021); MP for Kinabalu	USNO	Minister of Justice	1969	1970	Vacant	National Operations Council
	Abdul Kadir Yusof (1917–1992); Senator (1970-1974); MP for Tenggaroh (1974-1976)	Alliance (UMNO)	Minister of Law and Justice	1970	1974	Vacant	Abdul Razak Hussein (I)
	Abdul Kadir Yusof (1917–1992); Senator (1970-1974); MP for Tenggaroh (1974-1976)	BN (UMNO)	Minister of Law and Justice	1974	1976	Vacant	Abdul Razak Hussein (II); Hussein Onn (I)
	Hamzah Abu Samah (1924–2012); MP for Temerloh	BN (UMNO)	Minister of Law and Justice	1976	1980	Athi Narappan (1976–1978); Rais Yatim (1976–1978); Abdullah Abdul Rahman (1978–1980)	Hussein Onn (I • II)
	James Peter Ongkili (1939–2006); MP for Tuaran	BN (BERJAYA)	Minister of Justice	1982	1986	Vacant	Mahathir Mohamad (II)
	Mahathir Mohamad (Prime Minister) (b. 1925); MP for Kubang Pasu	BN (UMNO)	Minister of Justice	1986	1988	Vacant	Mahathir Mohamad (III)
	Sulaiman Daud (1933–2010); MP for Santubong	BN (PBB)	Minister of Justice	1988	1990	Vacant	Mahathir Mohamad (III)
	Syed Hamid Albar (b. 1944); MP for Kota Tinggi	BN (UMNO)	Minister of Justice	1990	1995	Vacant	Mahathir Mohamad (IV)

=== Law ===
The following individuals have been appointed as Minister of Law, or any of its precedent titles:

Political party: Alliance/BN

Portrait	Name (Birth–Death) Constituency	Political party	Title	Took office	Left office	Deputy Minister	Prime Minister (Cabinet)
	Abdul Kadir Yusof (1917–1992); Senator (1970-1974); MP for Tenggaroh (1974-1976)	Alliance (UMNO)	Minister of Law and Justice	1970	1974	Vacant	Abdul Razak Hussein (I)
	Abdul Kadir Yusof (1917–1992); Senator (1970-1974); MP for Tenggaroh (1974-1976)	BN (UMNO)	Minister of Law and Justice	1974	1976	Vacant	Abdul Razak Hussein (II); Hussein Onn (I)
	Hamzah Abu Samah (1924–2012); MP for Temerloh	BN (UMNO)	Minister of Law and Justice	1976	1980	Athi Narappan (1976–1978); Rais Yatim (1976–1978); Abdullah Abdul Rahman (1978–1980)	Hussein Onn (I • II)

=== Internal security ===
The following individuals have been appointed as Minister of Internal Security, or any of its precedent titles:

Political party: Alliance/BN

Portrait	Name (Birth–Death) Constituency	Political party	Title	Took office	Left office	Deputy Minister	Prime Minister (Cabinet)
	Ismail Abdul Rahman (1915–1973); MP for Johore Timor	Alliance (UMNO)	Minister of Internal Security	1959	1965	Vacant	Tunku Abdul Rahman (II • III)
	Abdullah Ahmad Badawi (1939–2025) (Prime Minister); MP for Kepala Batas	BN (UMNO)	Minister of Internal Security	27 March 2004	27 March 2008	Noh Omar (2004–2006); Chia Kwang Chye (2004–2006); Mohd Johari Baharum (2006–2008); Fu Ah Kiow (2006–2008)	Abdullah Ahmad Badawi (II)

=== Prime Minister's Department (Law/Legal Affairs) ===
Political party: BN WARISAN PN GPS

Portrait	Name (Birth–Death) Constituency	Political party	Responsible for	Took office	Left office	Deputy Minister	Prime Minister (Cabinet)
	Abang Abu Bakar Datu Bandar Hj. Mustaffa (b. 1941); MP for Kuala Rajang	BN (PBB)	Parliament and Legal Affairs Department	8 May 1995	7 January 1999	Vacant	Mahathir Mohamad (VII)
	Rais Yatim (b. 1942); MP for Jelebu	BN (UMNO)	Parliament and Legal Affairs Department	14 December 1999	4 March 2004	Vacant (1999–2003); M. Kayveas (2003–2004)	Mahathir Mohamad (VI)
	Mohd Radzi Sheikh Ahmad (b. 1942); MP for Kangar	BN (UMNO)	Parliament and Legal Affairs Department	27 March 2004	14 February 2006	M. Kayveas	Abdullah Ahmad Badawi (I•II)
	Mohamed Nazri Abdul Aziz (b. 1954); MP for Padang Rengas	BN (UMNO)	Parliament and Legal Affairs Department	14 February 2006	15 May 2013	M. Kayveas (2006–2008); Hasan Malek (2008–2009); Liew Vui Keong (2009–2013); Murugiah Thopasamy (2010–2011)	Abdullah Ahmad Badawi (II•III); Najib Razak (I)
	Zaid Ibrahim (b. 1951); Senator	BN (UMNO)	Legal Affairs and Judicial Reform Department	19 March 2008	16 September 2008	Hasan Malek	Abdullah Ahmad Badawi (III)
	Nancy Shukri (b. 1961); MP for Batang Sadong	BN (PBB)	Parliament and Legal Affairs Department	16 May 2013	27 June 2016	Razali Ibrahim	Najib Razak (II)
	Azalina Othman Said (b. 1963); MP for Pengerang	BN (UMNO)	Parliament and Legal Affairs Department	28 June 2016	9 May 2018	Razali Ibrahim	Najib Razak (II)
	Liew Vui Keong (1960–2020); MP for Batu Sapi	WARISAN	Parliament and Legal Affairs Department	2 July 2018	24 February 2020	Mohamed Hanipa Maidin	Mahathir Mohamad (VII)
	Takiyuddin Hassan (b. 1961); MP for Kota Bharu	PN (PAS)	Parliament and Legal Affairs Department	10 March 2020	16 August 2021	Eddin Syazlee Shith (2020); Shabudin Yahaya (2020–2021)	Muhyiddin Yassin (I)
	Wan Junaidi Tuanku Jaafar (b. 1946); MP for Santubong	GPS (PBB)	Parliament and Legal Affairs Department	30 August 2021	24 November 2022	Mas Ermieyati Samsudin	Ismail Sabri Yaakob (I)
	Azalina Othman Said (b.1963); MP for Pengerang	BN (UMNO)	Law and Institutional Reform Department	3 December 2022	Incumbent	Ramkarpal Singh (2022–2023); Kulasegaran Murugeson (2023–present)	Anwar Ibrahim (I)

=== Prime Minister's Department (Sabah and Sarawak Affairs) ===
Political Party: GRS PH

Portrait	Name (Birth–Death) Constituency	Political party	Title	Took office	Left office	Deputy Minister	Prime Minister (Cabinet)
	Dr. Maximus Johnity Ongkili (b. 1953); MP for Kota Marudu	GRS (PBS)	Sabah and Sarawak Affairs	10 March 2020	24 November 2022	Hanifah Hajar Taib	Muhyiddin Yassin (I); Ismail Sabri Yaakob (I)
	Armizan Mohd Ali (b. 1976); MP for Papar	GRS (Direct Member)	Sabah and Sarawak Affairs, and Special Duties	3 December 2022	12 December 2023	Wilson Ugak Kumbong	Anwar Ibrahim (I)
	Mustapha Sakmud (b.1968); MP for Sepanggar	PH (PKR)	Sabah and Sarawak Affairs	17 December 2025	Incumbent	Vacant	Anwar Ibrahim (I)
