= Syed Jaafar Albar =

Malaysian politician

Yang Berbahagia Tan Sri Dato' Syed Jaafar Albar PMN DPMJ
- سيد جعفر البار سيد حسن البار

6th Youth Chief of the United Malays National Organisation
- In office 1976–1977
- President: Abdul Razak Hussein
- Preceded by: Harun Idris
- Succeeded by: Suhaimi Kamaruddin

Member of the Malaysian Parliament for Panti
- In office 1974–1977
- Preceded by: Constituency established
- Succeeded by: Saadun Muhammad Noh

Member of the Malaysian Parliament for Johore Tenggara
- In office 1959–1974
- Preceded by: Constituency established
- Succeeded by: Constituency abolished

Personal details
- Born: 21 August 1914 Dutch East Indies (now Indonesia)
- Died: 14 January 1977 (aged 62) Muar, Johor, Malaysia
- Resting place: Makam Pahlawan, Masjid Negara, Kuala Lumpur
- Party: United Malays National Organisation (UMNO)
- Children: Syed Hamid Albar
- Occupation: Politician

Syed Jaafar bin Hassan Albar (Arabic: سيد جعفر بن حسن البار Sayyid Ja'far bin Ḥasan al-bār; born August 21, 1914 –14 January 1977) was a Malaysian politician of Hadhrami Arab origin. His staunch defence of his political party, the United Malays National Organisation (UMNO) – which leads the governing Barisan Nasional coalition – led to him being given the moniker "Lion of UMNO". He was also known for his radical views on Malay sovereignty over Malaysia, and Malay supremacy in politics, despite his non-Malay origin. He was born in Celebes, Dutch East Indies (now Sulawesi, Indonesia) and migrated when he was 14 years old to Singapore (then part of British Malaya).

He served as the Secretary-General of UMNO during the early 1960s, but resigned after Singapore was allowed to secede from Malaysia.

== Political career ==
After the 1963 Singapore state elections held shortly after Singapore merged with Malaya, Sabah and Sarawak to form Malaysia, it emerged that the Singapore UMNO branch had been terribly defeated by the ruling People's Action Party (PAP). Albar then travelled to Singapore to address the Malays, and denounced Malay PAP leaders such as Othman Wok as traitors to the Malay race and UnIslamic.

Later, he had participated in verbal duels with the Singaporean Prime Minister, Lee Kuan Yew, over the issue of ketuanan Melayu (Malay sovereignty over Malaysia). Lee accused Albar of being an "ultra" for making remarks such as "Wherever I am, I am a Malay." Lee criticised him for this, asking "If I had been going round and saying what [he] has been saying – wherever I am, I am a Chinese – where would we be? But I keep on reminding the people that I am a Malaysian. I am learning Bahasa Kebangsaan (Malay, the national language) and I accept Article 153 of the Constitution."

Albar also accused Lee and some other Chinese Malaysians – referring to them as kaum pendatang or pendatang asing (immigrants) – of being lodgers (orang tumpangan), abusing the hospitality of the Malays who were the "masters of the house". This provoked a response from Cabinet member Lim Swee Aun, who insisted "we are co-owners, not lodgers, not guests."

Lee took a swipe at his politics by arguing "According to history, Malays began to migrate to Malaysia in noticeable numbers only about 700 years ago. Of the 39% Malays in Malaysia today, about one-third are comparatively new immigrants like the secretary-general of UMNO, Dato' Syed Jaafar Albar. Therefore it is wrong and illogical for a particular racial group to think that they are more justified to be called Malaysians and that the others can become Malaysian only through their favour."

The Malaysian Prime Minister, Tunku Abdul Rahman, eventually tired of the bickering and told Singapore to secede from Malaysia. The matter was hushed up, with not even the UMNO Members of Parliament such as Albar being informed of what 9 August 1965 Parliamentary session would be concerned about. When Albar demanded more information on why their presence was demanded, he was rebuffed. Upon discovering that day itself that the purpose of the meeting was to allow Singapore to secede, Albar left Parliament House, not participating in the final unanimous vote. As this was directly contrary to his orders, the Tunku insisted on sacking Albar as UMNO Secretary-General, but was later persuaded to permit Albar to graciously resign instead.

Albar was opposed to the idea of allowing Singapore to secede, because he felt that imposing emergency rule over Singapore and removing Lee as Prime Minister would have been an ideal solution. Before secession, he had vocally called for Lee to be arrested for destroying racial harmony through his "Malaysian Malaysia" campaign, which the Malays saw as threatening the special rights granted to them under Article 153 of the Constitution.

Albar also served as Minister of Rural Development for a time.

== Family ==
Syed Jaafar had a son, Syed Hamid Albar, who later followed in his footsteps to be active in politics. Syed Hamid went on to serve as Foreign Affairs Minister and Home Minister. In April 2009 however, Syed Hamid was dropped from the cabinet.

== Death ==
Syed Jaafar Albar died on 14 January 1977 and was buried at the Makam Pahlawan (Heroes' Mausoleum) near Masjid Negara, Kuala Lumpur.

== Honours ==
=== Honours of Malaysia ===
- Malaya
  - Companion of the Order of the Defender of the Realm (JMN) (1958)
- Malaysia
  - Commander of the Order of the Defender of the Realm (PMN) – Tan Sri (1964)
- Johor
  - Knight Commander of the Order of the Crown of Johor (DPMJ) – Dato' (1974)
