= Abdul Kadir Yusof =

Malaysian politician

Yang Berbahagia Tan Sri Dato' Abdul Kadir Yusof PMN SPMJ SSIJ SPDK
- عبدالقادر يوسف

Minister of Land and Regional Development
- In office 1977–1980
- Monarchs: Yahya Petra; Ahmad Shah
- Preceded by: Asri Muda
- Succeeded by: Shariff Ahmad

Minister of Law and Justice
- In office 1970–1976
- Monarchs: Abdul Halim; Yahya Petra
- Preceded by: Abdul Ghani Gilong
- Succeeded by: Hamzah Abu Samah

Attorney General of Malaysia
- In office 1963–1977
- Monarchs: Putra; Ismail Nasiruddin; Abdul Halim; Yahya Petra
- Preceded by: Cecil Majella Sheridan (as Attorney General of the Federation of Malaya)
- Succeeded by: Hamzah Abu Samah

Member of the Malaysian Parliament for Tenggaroh
- In office 1974–1982
- Preceded by: Constituency created
- Succeeded by: Khadri Sabran

Personal details
- Born: 10 September 1917 Parit Sakai, Muar, Johor, Unfederated Malay States, British Malaya (now Malaysia)
- Died: 18 April 1992 (aged 74) Bukit Pantai, Bangsar, Kuala Lumpur
- Resting place: Makam Pahlawan, Masjid Negara, Kuala Lumpur
- Party: United Malays National Organisation (UMNO)
- Other political affiliations: Barisan Nasional (BN)
- Spouse: Fatimah Hashim (m. 1943)
- Children: 6
- Education: Lincoln's Inn

Abdul Kadir Yusof (Jawi: عبدالقادر بن يوسف; 10 September 1917 – 18 April 1992) was a Malaysian politician. A lawyer by profession, Abdul Kadir held the posts of Attorney General and Solicitor-General at various points during his lifetime. He was also the Minister of Law. Together with his wife Fatimah Hashim, former Welfare Minister, Abdul Kadir represented one half of the first couple to be on the Malaysian cabinet.

== Life and education ==
Abdul Kadir was born in Parit Sakai, Muar, Johor in 1917. He began his education at Muar Government English School and later graduated from Raffles College in Singapore with a Diploma in Arts in 1941. A year later, he joined the Johor Civil Service and was seconded as a Circuit Magistrate in 1950. Abdul Kadir later pursue legal studies at Lincoln's Inn in 1952, graduating with a Barrister-at-Law in 1952 and was called to the English Bar the same year.

During his lifetime, he was a member of the United Malays National Organisation, the leading party in the ruling coalition Barisan Nasional. He was a Tenggaroh State Assemblyman.

== Family ==
Kadir is survived by his wife, politician Fatimah Hashim, six children, nineteen grandchildren and 11 great-grandchildren.

== Death ==
Abdul Kadir died of lung cancer at his home in Kuala Lumpur on 18 April 1992 and was buried in Makam Pahlawan near Masjid Negara, Kuala Lumpur on the next day.

== Foundation ==
The Yayasan Kadir & Fatimah (Yayasan K&F) confers the Tan Sri Abdul Kadir Gold Medal Award to UIA (Faculty of Law for the best Syariah Law student) and to UKM (Faculty of Law for the best Law Student). The Tan Sri Abdul Kadir Gold Medal is also awarded to the student who tops the Accounting Law paper for CPA. The Yayasan recently started conferring the Tun Fatimah medal for the best female student active in community work for the first time in September 2007 and will be awarded annually to Universiti Malaya, Universiti Teknologi Mara and Universiti Teknologi Malaysia students.

Yayasan K&F continues to support public primary schools in Johor and Kedah, organise the annual Tan Sri Abdul Kadir Charity Golf Tournament to raise funds, and numerous other charitable causes through Abdul Kadir and Fatimah's children and grandchildren.

== Legacy ==
Several projects and institutions were named after him, including:

- Dewan Tan Sri Abdul Kadir Yusuf in Attorney General Chambers in Putrajaya.
- Perpustakaan Tan Sri Abdul Kadir Yusuf in Seremban, Negeri Sembilan.
- Sekolah Menengah Kebangsaan Tan Sri Abdul Kadir in Mersing, Johor.
- Sekolah Agama Tan Sri Abdul Kadir in Endau, Johor.

== Honours ==
=== Honours of Malaysia ===
- Malaysia
  - Recipient of the Malaysian Commemorative Medal (Silver) (PPM) (1965)
  - Commander of the Order of the Defender of the Realm (PMN) – Tan Sri (1966)
- Johor
  - Knight Grand Commander of the Order of the Crown of Johor (SPMJ) – Dato' (1973)
  - Knight Grand Companion of the Order of Loyalty of Sultan Ismail of Johor (SSIJ) – Dato' (1976)
- Sabah
  - Grand Commander of the Order of Kinabalu (SPDK) – Datuk Seri Panglima
