= Ismail Abdul Rahman =

Deputy Prime Minister of Malaysia from 1970 to 1973

Yang Amat Berbahagia Tun Ismail Abdul Rahman SSM PMN SPMJ
- إسماعيل عبدالرحمن

2nd Deputy Prime Minister of Malaysia
- In office 22 September 1970 – 2 August 1973
- Monarch: Abdul Halim
- Prime Minister: Abdul Razak Hussein
- Preceded by: Abdul Razak Hussein
- Succeeded by: Hussein Onn

Minister of Home Affairs
- In office 20 May 1969 – 2 August 1973
- Monarchs: Ismail Nasiruddin; Abdul Halim
- Prime Minister: Tunku Abdul Rahman; Abdul Razak Hussein
- Preceded by: Abdul Razak Hussein
- Succeeded by: Ghazali Shafie
- In office 1965–1967
- Monarch: Ismail Nasiruddin
- Prime Minister: Tunku Abdul Rahman
- Preceded by: Tunku Abdul Rahman
- Succeeded by: Abdul Razak Hussein

Minister of Trade and Industry
- In office 3 January 1973 – 12 August 1973
- Monarch: Abdul Halim
- Prime Minister: Abdul Razak Hussein
- Preceded by: Office established
- Succeeded by: Hussein Onn

Minister of Commerce and Industry
- In office 20 September 1959 – 17 November 1959
- Monarch: Abdul Rahman
- Prime Minister: Tunku Abdul Rahman
- Preceded by: Tan Siew Sin
- Succeeded by: Khir Johari

Minister of External Affairs
- In office 3 February 1959 – 31 August 1960
- Monarchs: Abdul Rahman; Hisamuddin
- Prime Minister: Tunku Abdul Rahman
- Preceded by: Tunku Abdul Rahman
- Succeeded by: Tunku Abdul Rahman

2nd Deputy President of the United Malays National Organisation
- In office 22 September 1970 – 2 August 1973
- President: Abdul Razak Hussein
- Preceded by: Abdul Razak Hussein
- Succeeded by: Hussein Onn

Member of the Malaysian Parliament for Johore Timor (Parliament suspended 13 May 1969 – 20 February 1971)
- In office 11 September 1959 – 2 August 1973
- Preceded by: Himself (as Member of the Malayan Federal Legislative Council for Johore Timor)
- Succeeded by: Abdul Rahman Sabri

Member of the Malayan Federal Legislative Council for Johore Timor
- In office 1955–1959
- Preceded by: Constituency established
- Succeeded by: Himself (as Member of the Malaysian Parliament for Johore Timor)

Personal details
- Born: Ismail bin Abdul Rahman; 4 November 1915 Johor Bahru, Johor, Unfederated Malay States, British Malaya (now Malaysia)
- Died: 2 August 1973 (aged 57) Kuala Lumpur, Malaysia
- Resting place: Makam Pahlawan, Masjid Negara, Kuala Lumpur
- Party: United Malays National Organisation (UMNO)
- Other political affiliations: Barisan Nasional (BN)
- Spouse: Norashikin Mohd Seth (m. 1950)
- Relations: Suleiman Abdul Rahman (brother); Awang Hassan (brother-in-law); Mohd Ghazali Mohd Seth (brother-in-law); Abu Bakar Suleiman (nephew); Yahya Awang (nephew)
- Children: 6 (including Mohamed Tawfik)
- Parents: Abdul Rahman Mohamed Yassin (father); Zaharah Abu Bakar (mother)
- Education: Queen's College, The University of Melbourne (MBBS)

Ismail bin Abdul Rahman (Jawi: إسماعيل بن عبدالرحمن; 4 November 1915 – 2 August 1973) was a Malaysian politician who served as the second Deputy Prime Minister of Malaysia from September 1970 to his death in August 1973. A member of the United Malays National Organisation (UMNO), he previously held several ministerial posts.

Ismail has been called "the man who saved Malaysia" for his actions as Minister of Home Affairs after the 13 May incident of racial rioting in 1969.

== Early life ==
Ismail was born on 4 November 1915 in Johor Bahru, Johor. He was the son of Abdul Rahman Mohamed Yassin, who was of Buginese descent. Abdul Rahman was the first President of the Dewan Negara (Senate) of the Parliament of Malaysia, and also the first chairman of Malayan Banking. His maternal grandfather was Abu Bakar Abdullah, an ethnic Chinese convert to Islam and former State Treasurer of Johor. After Ismail's mother, Zaharah Abu Bakar, Abdul Rahman's wife, died in 1936, Abdul Rahman remarried Kamariah, the sister of Onn Ja'afar, the Menteri Besar (Chief Minister) of Johor. The remarriage was encouraged by Sultan Ibrahim of Johor, who sought to unite the Johor aristocracy by blood. Abdul Rahman himself almost became Menteri Besar according to Ismail, but failed because he "refused to indulge in intrigues".

=== Education ===
Ismail was raised by his maternal grandmother due to his mother's various illnesses and received his primary education at Sekolah Bukit Zaharah, although his education was interrupted by frequent trips to see distant relatives. Ismail's initial friends were predominantly Malay, but when he continued his education at the English College Johore Bahru, Ismail gravitated to non-Malays due to his interest in the opposite sex – Chinese girls often being given more freedom to mingle than their Malay counterparts in those days. Ismail later said: "I am convinced that this early mingling with the other races during the most impressionable stage of my life had a lot to do with my non-racial outlook." Ismail forged close friendships with the daughters of Cheah Tiang Earn, a friend of his father's. Eileen and Joyce Chuah would later both marry into the influential Kuok family, which Ismail got to know through them. Ismail also befriended the children of Joseph Chako Puthucheary, who would later become important players in Malaysian and Singaporean politics.

Ismail's father believed strongly in the benefits of education, unlike many Malays of the time, and ensured his children received the best education possible. Two of his sons became lawyers and another an economist. In 1939, the British General Adviser W.E. Pepys lamented that "the only Johore Malay who has got a university degree is Inche (Mr.) Suleiman bin Abdul Rahman, the son of Dato Abdul Rahman, State Treasurer, Johore." Ismail himself went on to obtain a degree at the King Edward VII College of Medicine in Singapore. In 1945, he became the first Malay to obtain an MBBS from University of Melbourne, Australia. Ismail's son later said that his education in Australia greatly impacted his worldview: "He was on his own and a member of a minority there. He didn’t have other Malays to prop him up and he had a sense of loneliness. He felt that he was treated as an equal and that this was the way he would want to treat other people as well."

=== Early career ===
In 1946, the British formed the Malayan Union, a polity seen as infringing on the special position of the Malays and the Malay Rulers. Ismail's family was heavily involved in the anti-Malayan Union campaign led by the United Malays National Organisation (UMNO). After the successful campaign led to the replacement of the Malayan Union with the Federation of Malaya, Ismail was appointed to the Johor State Legislative Assembly by Dato' Onn Jaafar, the Chief Minister of Johor. Ismail was also offered a seat on the Federal Legislative Council by Onn, but on the condition that Ismail join UMNO. Ismail refused, insisting that he would only join UMNO if it committed itself to fighting for Malayan independence. In the Johor state legislative assembly, his very first action was to declare his opposition to the UMNO-supported federation, which he considered in contravention of the Johor state constitution.

Ismail focused on his private practice, founding the Tawakkal (Trust in God) Clinic which he ran from 1947 to 1953. During this period, Ismail co-founded the Malay Graduates' Association, a political discussion group for intellectuals. Ismail observed:

It was impossible to influence people to support the independence movement merely by writing articles because time was against it and in any case all the newspapers that enjoyed a wide circulation were not anxious to do the wrong thing against the government in power. It was also impractical for the intellectuals to form their own party because such a party would not get mass support. The only alternative was to join a political party that already had mass support and which could be directed to fight for the independence of the country.

=== Marriage and personal life ===
In 1950, Ismail married Norashikin Mohd Seth (nicknamed Neno) in an arranged marriage. On passing through Kuala Lumpur on the way to their honeymoon in Penang, they met Tunku Abdul Rahman, who would later succeed Onn Jaafar as President of UMNO. Ismail later recounted that the Tunku had invited him and his new bride to the Kuala Lumpur Flying Club to dance, but upon finding that they were newlyweds "bundled us off telling us that we had no business being on the dance floor so late when we should be in bed enjoying our honeymoon." The Tunku later cited the support of Ismail and the Malay Graduates Association as the major impetus for his decision to become president, while Ismail in turn claimed he decided to join UMNO only after the Tunku became president in 1951.

Ismail would have six children with Neno: Tawfik (born 1951), Zailah (1953–2017), Badariah (born 1959), Tarmizi (born 1961), Zamakhshari (born 1963) and Ariff (born 1965).

== Before Independence ==
Ismail entered Malaysian politics in 1951 when he was elected as vice-president of the United Malays National Organisation (UMNO). He had earlier been the nominee of the Malay Graduates Association to the UMNO Central Executive Committee. Initially, Ismail and his brother Suleiman, also an UMNO member, mainly clashed with Dato Onn, who had left UMNO to form the Independence of Malaya Party (IMP) after UMNO refused to open membership to non-Malays. Ismail was very critical of Onn, who had made "very inflammatory communal speeches attacking the Chinese". Suleiman later defeated Onn in the first Malayan general election, and was lauded as a "giant-killer" for his landslide victory against Onn, who had been the favourite.

Ismail was also instrumental in gaining a greater amount of autonomy for the local government, when in 1954 the Alliance government (a coalition of UMNO and the Malayan Chinese Association or MCA) decided to boycott the British-backed local elections. When the British High Commissioner Donald MacGillivray met with the Tunku, Ismail, and the MCA's representative of H. S. Lee, he accused them of playing into the hands of the Malayan Communist Party, which was waging an armed insurgency against the British. The source of the dispute was that the British High Commissioner had been given the discretion to nominate six seats, in addition to those contested in the elections. Ismail proposed a compromise: the Alliance would support the elections, but only if the High Commissioner would consult with the party that won the elections before making his appointments. MacGillivray initially refused, but after finding public opinion against him, backed down.

Later, Ismail was part of the Malayan government delegation sent to London to negotiate terms for independence from the British. In the Federal Legislative Council, he was also a strong proponent of the controversial Razak Report. Outside the council, many Chinese were upset about the lack of provisions for vernacular education, while within the council, Malay members from UMNO condemned the Report for not making Malay the sole medium of instruction. Ismail accused the report's opponents in the Council of making "no considerations for the Chinese and Indians who are already in this country", and acting in an imperialistic manner. If the non-Malays accepted Malaya's status as a Malay country and that the national language was Malay, he argued, there was no reason to further suppress them. The Razak Report eventually became law, when the Council approved it as the Education Ordinance of 1957.

Ismail analysed the Malay distrust of the Chinese as such:

Under colonial rule there was a cumulative increase in the population of immigrant races, especially those of Chinese origin and to a lesser extent the Indians, the latter brought in mainly to work in the rubber estates owned by the British. No attempt was made to make these immigrants loyal citizens of Malaya. The British were content to see that so long as they obey the laws of the country, they could come and leave as they please. As a result of this policy, when more and more of them settled in Malaya, the result was an increasing number of aliens in the country who, on the whole, were richer and more vigorous than the Malays. When the Malays seized political power after the Second World War, their main defence against their more virile and richer neighbours was to deny them the right of citizenship.

In Ismail's view, it was imperative that "if the Chinese – the real political problem since the other races were not dominant – were to be persuaded into accepting Malay as the national language, they should be granted citizenship as a quid pro quo" – an early expression of what would later be referred to as the Malaysian social contract.

== Independent Malaya ==
After independence in 1957, Ismail was appointed as Malaya and Malaysia's first ambassador to the United States of America, as well as the United Nations – two posts to be held concurrently by him from 1957 till 1959. When Ismail led the independent Malayan delegation to the General Assembly, he carried the traditional Malay dagger (kris) – according to him, the first time a weapon of any kind had been brought into the assembly. At the UN, Ismail developed a strongly held view that Malayan foreign policy had to keep "an independent line, by which I mean that our stand on international problems should not be influenced by the policies of other countries, big or small". While serving in the United States and at the United Nations, Ismail wrote personal notes to the Prime Minister, which were recently compiled and published in a book titled "Malaya's First Year at the UN". Ismail remained involved in local politics, however, and pressed for the Alliance coalition of UMNO, the MCA and the Malayan Indian Congress (MIC) to merge into one multi-racial party, instead of remaining as a coalition comprising three mono-racial parties.

Upon returning to Malaya in 1959, he was appointed as external affairs minister. The following year, a controversy arose when the Tunku stated that Malaya would eventually have to recognise the communist People's Republic of China. This was, in the Tunku's words, "a sudden change in our policy towards Communist China" that had been influenced by private talks between the Tunku and French President Charles de Gaulle. Ismail was outraged by this decision, which had been taken without consultation with him, and directly contradicted Ismail's stated policy of refusing to recognise the People's Republic of China as long as they backed the Malayan Communist Party, which had waged an armed insurgency against the government. Ismail threatened to resign, and apparently attempted to do so on four separate occasions. The situation was defused by the Tunku refusing to see Ismail, who eventually calmed down and put the incident behind him, behaving "as if nothing had happened."

Ismail was later persuaded by his brothers not to quit, but to instead transfer to a different ministry. He was then made the new internal security minister, a post which had been specifically created for him. In 1962, he was appointed to the portfolio of home affairs as well. In these roles, Ismail was in charge of detaining people under the controversial Internal Security Act (ISA), which permits detention without trial. After resigning in 1967, Ismail expressed amazement that he was not "the most hated man in Malaya" for his actions. Although many were critical of the ISA, Ismail believed it was necessary for public order, stating that "Abuse of the Act can be prevented by vigilant public opinion via elections, a free Press and above all the Parliament."

== Malaysia ==
In 1963, Malaya merged with the former British colonies of Singapore, Sabah and Sarawak to form Malaysia. Ismail retained his cabinet positions in the new polity. During this period, despite no longer being in charge of external affairs, Ismail expressed strong support for an "Association of Southeast Asia", telling the media that "We look forward to a regional association embracing Thailand, Burma, Indonesia, Singapore, Malaysia, Philippines, Cambodia, Laos and Vietnam." This proposal eventually became the Association of Southeast Asian Nations (ASEAN).

Ismail also presented Malaysia's case to the United Nations when Indonesia launched its armed "Confrontation" against the new polity, charging it with being the tool of neo-colonialists. Ismail managed to sneak a number of weapons captured from Indonesian military personnel into a meeting of the UN Security Council, greatly upsetting the council's president, who asked him to remove them. Later, Ismail was a critic of Lee Kuan Yew, the Singaporean Prime Minister, for his attempt to de-emphasise race in Malaysian politics through the establishment of a non-racial political coalition, the Malaysian Solidarity Council (MSC). The resulting political controversy led to Singapore's separation from Malaysia; however, Ismail, like Toh Chin Chye, expressed his belief that Singapore and Malaysia would eventually merge once more, stating: "It is better to wait for this to come because if they do not do so they will sink together instead of coming together."

In 1966, Ismail became the first recipient of the First Class of the Darjah Yang Mulia Setia Mahkota Malaysia (The Most Esteemed Order of the Crown of Malaysia), entitling him to the title of Tun and the post-nominal SSM. Ismail resigned from his government posts in 1967, citing his poor health. A heart specialist had previously told him to retire from politics due to Ismail being "more sensitive to personality stresses than most people" – advice Ismail said he would have ignored, had it not been for his five young children. The Tunku accepted Ismail's resignation, noting that he had previously forced Ismail's brother, Suleiman, to continue working in public service, with fatal results when Suleiman suddenly died. After retiring from politics, Ismail went on to head the Guthrie Group of Companies, where he was paid three times the amount earned by a cabinet minister.

== 13 May 1969 Incident ==
In the 1969 general election, the Alliance suffered substantial losses. The MCA, which was hardest hit, decided to withdraw from the government as they felt they were no longer representative of the Chinese community. Ismail was very critical of this decision, and attempted to persuade the MCA President, Tan Siew Sin, to change his mind. Ismail warned that "this decision if not revoked would contribute to rioting and chaos in the country". On 13 May, after several controversial victory rallies were held by the victorious opposition, racial riots broke out in the federal capital, Kuala Lumpur. Ismail's daughter later said that her father "remained calm, but took out his pistol, put it into his pocket, and went out with my mother to dinner". On the morning of 14 May, a police escort was dispatched by Tun Abdul Razak, the Deputy Prime Minister, to escort Ismail from his home. Ismail was persuaded to rejoin the government as home affairs minister.

The Tunku arranged a meeting of several of his top aides, including Ismail. At the meeting, Tun Abdul Razak expressed support for declaring martial law, but was dissuaded by General Ibrahim Ismail, who told him that "I cannot provide any guarantee (that I will) be able to hold back the members of the armed forces who might take over control of the government." On 15 May, a state of emergency was declared and Parliament was suspended in favour of the National Operations Council (NOC), a body of top government officials. That day, Ismail announced to the media that "Democracy is dead in this country. It died at the hands of the opposition parties who triggered off the event leading to this violence." Privately, Ismail accused the opposition parties of playing "communal politics", by using the Islamic party, PAS, to appeal to the extremist Malays, and using the ostensibly multiracial parties such as the Democratic Action Party and Parti Gerakan Rakyat Malaysia to appeal to the extremist Chinese. "Since the Alliance's policy is based on compromise," he said, "it could not therefore please all the Malays or all the Chinese but could only please the moderate Malays and the understanding Chinese." Ismail blamed the MCA as well, telling a friend that "it was with this tension, with this irresponsible decision by the MCA that the riot started".

Tun Abdul Razak was initially interested in the possibility of a benevolent dictatorship, but was reportedly dissuaded by Ismail, who wanted to restore power to Parliament as soon as possible. Abdullah Ahmad Badawi, future prime minister and then an aide to the NOC, later recalled that Tun Abdul Razak often took pains to accommodate Ismail's views, extending meetings whenever there was a clash of opinions so as to satisfy Ismail.

Ismail's reputation for fairness but uncompromising toughness – at one point, he declared he would arrest his own mother if she had broken the law – has been cited by a number of top officials as greatly contributing to stability in the wake of the riots. During this period, several Malay "ultras" such as Mahathir Mohamad and Musa Hitam called for the resignation of the Prime Minister, Tunku Abdul Rahman. Mahathir penned an open letter to the Tunku, accusing him of "giving the Chinese what they demand ... you have given them too much face." Soon, students at higher educational institutions across the country began to hold mass demonstrations, calling for the Tunku to step down in favour of a leader who would restore "Malay sovereignty". Sporadic rioting, believed to have been instigated by the Tunku's opponents, broke out. The Tunku responded by forcing Mahathir and Musa out of UMNO, while Ismail as Home Affairs Minister issued a statement: "These ultras believe in the wild and fantastic theory of absolute dominion by one race over the other communities, regardless of the Constitution. ... Polarisation has taken place in Malaysian politics and the extreme racialists among the ruling party are making a desperate bid to topple the present leadership."

At the time, some suggested that Tun Abdul Razak was a power-hungry ultra, seeking to displace the Tunku as prime minister. Although this was denied by both the Tunku and Abdul Razak, there was great concern among non-Malays as to how the NOC's policy would affect them, as the NOC was chaired by Abdul Razak and not the Tunku. Tengku Razaleigh Hamzah, later finance minister, cited Ismail as a major factor in increasing public confidence in the government, stating: "The Chinese did not have much confidence in Razak, but they did in Ismail. Razak was always associated with Malay and rural affairs, et cetera. Ismail was a principled man — and was seen that way by the different races. He was the Rock of Gibraltar. Once he decided on something you could be sure that he had gone through the relevant details and studied them. What is confidence unless it is based on the people’s belief in the leader?"

== Deputy Prime Minister ==
In 1970, he was appointed as the second deputy prime minister, replacing Tun Abdul Razak, who had been elevated to prime minister following the resignation of Tunku Abdul Rahman. Shortly before, Ismail had become privy to the secret that Abdul Razak was suffering from leukaemia. Only Razak's doctors, Razak and Ismail knew of Razak's health problems, with Razak often using the pretext of paying Ismail a visit at his home to be examined by doctors at a hidden building near Ismail's house.

Not long after, Ismail himself discovered a lump in his neck while shaving – the lump was later confirmed to be cancerous. As a result, many within Ismail's family urged him to retire again. However, Ismail considered it his duty to assist Abdul Razak as deputy prime minister, and thus refused to resign, delaying the treatment for his neck cancer and refusing an operation on his heart valves to continue working.

Around July 1973, Ismail suffered three heart attacks over the course of two weeks – a secret he kept from his wife, who was expecting. Ismail told a friend that he planned to resign after Tun Abdul Razak returned from Ottawa in Canada, where he was attending the Commonwealth summit – Ismail had promised to serve as acting prime minister while Razak was away.

== Death ==
On 2 August 1973, Ismail attended the silver jubilee celebrations of the Peninsular Malaysia Malay Students Foundation (GPMS). After a sudden explosion sound effect, Ismail's daughter, who was watching the event live on television, noticed her dad began to sweat profusely. Nevertheless, afterwards, Ismail visited his wife, who was recovering from the ligation, at the hospital as had been planned.

After having his dinner, Ismail retired to his study. Later, he rang the bell for his maid, asking for his daughter and telling her that "I am going to die. Please call my doctor and inform Gopal" (his private secretary). Ismail had suffered a massive heart attack.

Normally, Dr Stewart C. Macpherson, a neighbour of Ismail's and personal doctor to him and Prime Minister Abdul Razak Hussein, would have immediately attended to Ismail. However, Macpherson had accompanied Razak to the summit, forcing Ismail to phone his other doctor, Dr Catterall, who lived in the satellite town of Petaling Jaya. Upon arrival, Catterall immediately began efforts to resuscitate Ismail, soon being joined by the royal physician, Dr Pillai. Panicked Cabinet members soon arrived, and began discussing the future of politics without Ismail – an incident Ismail's young son found disturbing as Ismail had yet to be declared dead. Catterall laboured for five hours to save Ismail, but to no avail. Ismail's official time of death was later pronounced as 10PM.

Without Ismail, the country was momentarily leaderless, without an acting prime minister. Tun Razak ordered that he be laid in state at the Malaysian Houses of Parliament, and be buried at the Makam Pahlawan (Heroes' Mausoleum) near Masjid Negara (National Mosque), Kuala Lumpur. Ismail would be the first to be laid to rest there, and also the first recipient of a Malaysian state funeral. However, Works & Communications Minister Tun Sardon Jubir, the next-most senior Cabinet minister, ordered that Ismail lie in state at the Masjid Negara, and that he be buried just outside the Makam Pahlawan instead. As Ismail's body was transported from his home to the National Mosque, crowds thronged the streets.

Razak was provided with a plane by the Canadian government that took him to Copenhagen, from where he took a commercial flight to Kuala Lumpur. Ismail's burial was postponed until his arrival. Upon arrival, finding that his instructions for Ismail's funeral had not been followed, Razak reportedly exclaimed to Ismail's widow, "Who am I to trust now?" Razak was particularly upset that the lying in state had been held in the National Mosque instead of the Houses of Parliament, as he had intended that non-Muslim Malaysians be able to view the lying in state without discomfort.

Tun Sardon Jubir attempted to justify his instructions by citing a mufti who had informed him that Muslims could not be buried under a roof. The Tunku was exasperated by this explanation, remarking: "My forefathers are all buried in a mausoleum under a roof!" Razak, who would normally have overlooked such incidents, delayed the burial and brought in a detachment of soldiers to tear up the floor of the mausoleum, where Ismail was indeed laid to rest.

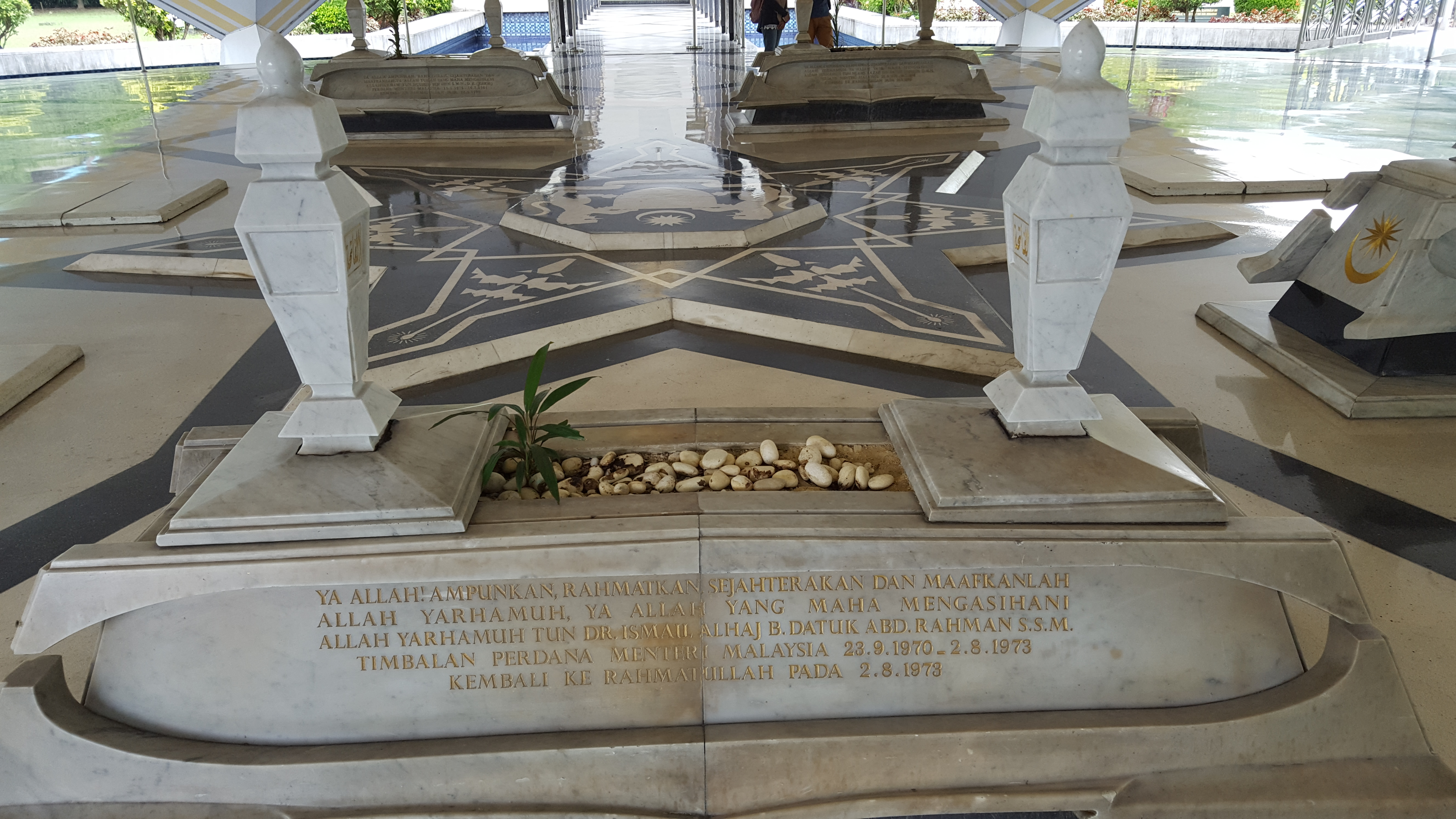
Tun Dr. Ismail's gravesite at the Makam Pahlawan (Heroes' Mausoleum) in Masjid Negara, Kuala Lumpur.

== Political views ==
Ismail was particularly known for his non-ethnic approach to political issues. Expressing concern over racial polarisation in the country, he once asked:

Why did we fight for Merdeka? So that the different races can be divided? That can't be the way, right? That can't be why all these great Malay and Umno leaders fought for this ... Something is wrong... I hope the new discussions will start. Why are we building Malaysia? What Malaysia are we building? What kind of symbol is Malaysia supposed to be?

Although, according to his biographers, Ismail was "usually considered as a very good Malay leader...Ismail knew that Malaysia is full of non-Malays." Unlike other UMNO politicians, Ismail avoided cultivating a political following: "He was there to build the country. That's it. He was actually a reluctant politician. So he wasn't a politician in the sense that he didn't cultivate 'my people'. He didn't care whether he made friends or not. That kind of person wasn't very popular".

As Foreign Minister, Ismail pushed for non-alignment and non-interference in the internal affairs of ASEAN countries. He also supported the establishment of a central bank to quell foreign investment worries about a lack of independence in Malaysian monetary policy.

== Election results ==
Parliament of Malaysia
Year	Constituency	Candidate	Votes	Pct	Opponent(s)	Votes	Pct	Ballots cast	Majority	Turnout
1955	P049 Johore Timor	Ismail Abdul Rahman (UMNO)	10,800	94.71%	Ja'afar Ali (NEGARA)	350	3.07%	11,403	10,450	82.80%
1955	P049 Johore Timor	Ismail Abdul Rahman (UMNO)	10,800	94.71%	Abdullah Taib (IND)	253	2.22%	11,403	10,450	82.80%
1959	P102 Johore Timor	Ismail Abdul Rahman (UMNO)	7,087	79.26%	Ismail Mohd. Arif (IND)	1,854	20.74%	9,116	5,233	74.75%
1964	P102 Johore Timor	Ismail Abdul Rahman (UMNO)	10,331	91.91%	Che Khadijah Mohd Sidik (PAS)	909	8.09%	11,996	9,422	80.31%
1969	P102 Johore Timor	Ismail Abdul Rahman (UMNO)	9,689	80.02%	Hussin Mohamed Salleh (PAS)	2,419	19.98%	12,942	7,270	70.71%

== Honours ==
=== Honours of Malaya/Malaysia ===
- Malaya
  - Commander of the Order of the Defender of the Realm (PMN) – Tan Sri, formerly Dato' (1959)
- Malaysia
  - Recipient of the Malaysian Commemorative Medal (Gold) (PPM) (1965)
  - Grand Commander of the Order of Loyalty to the Crown of Malaysia (SSM) – Tun (1966)
- Johor
  - Knight Grand Commander of the Order of the Crown of Johor (SPMJ) – Dato' (1965)

=== Foreign honours ===
- South Vietnam
  - Grand Officer of the National Order of Vietnam (1965)
- Indonesia
  - Star of the Republic of Indonesia 2nd Class (Adipradana) (1970)

== Legacy ==
The legacy left behind by Ismail is often viewed in a positive light. It is conventionally held that his sudden death altered the course of Malaysian history – Tun Abdul Razak appointed Hussein Onn as his new deputy, and Hussein Onn would later appoint Mahathir as deputy prime minister after succeeding Razak, setting Mahathir on the course towards becoming prime minister. Despite this, historians have often overlooked Ismail; one biographer of his has said that:

A thorough understanding of Ismail's contributions has traditionally been made difficult by the fact that he was always the third or the second most powerful man in the country. Historiographic convention has always allowed the Tunku and Razak to overshadow Ismail's achievements, and his name is often mentioned in combination with the other two, and with Tan Siew Sin.

Ismail's eldest son has suggested that Ismail was largely ignored because "Razak didn't want people to know about his illness and he didn't need a prop like Dr Ismail. He had to move out of Dr Ismail's shadow. My father didn't say he was controlling Razak, but people perceived he was doing so, including those who advised Razak." Generally, Ismail has been regarded as reliable and incorruptible, "remembered for his deep dislike of incompetence and bigotry, his strict adherence to the virtues of hard work and honesty, and his belief in the principles of national independence and multi-racialism".

Tycoon Robert Kuok, a friend of Ismail's, would later remark that:

In my opinion, he was probably the most non-racial, non-racist Malay I have met in my life. And I have met a very wide range of Malays from all parts of Malaysia. Doc was a stickler for total fair play, for correctness; total anathema to him to be anything else. Every Malay colleague feared him because of this, including Mahathir.

=== Places named after him ===
Several places were named after him, including:

- Taman Tun Dr Ismail, a township in Kuala Lumpur, and the MRT station serving it.
- SK Tun Dr Ismail, a primary school in Padang Rengas, Perak
- SK Tun Doktor Ismail, a primary school in Sabak Bernam, Selangor
- SMK Tun Dr Ismail (STUDI), a secondary school in Muar, Johor
- SMK Taman Tun Dr. Ismail (SMKTTDI), a secondary school in Kuala Lumpur
- SK Taman Tun Dr Ismail (1), a primary school in Kuala Lumpur
- SK Taman Tun Dr. Ismail (2), a primary school in Kuala Lumpur
- Kolej Tun Dr. Ismail, a residential college at Universiti Kebangsaan Malaysia, Bangi, Selangor
- Kolej Tun Dr. Ismail, a residential college at Universiti Putra Malaysia, Serdang, Selangor
- Kolej Tun Dr. Ismail, a residential college at Universiti Malaysia Perlis, Kuala Perlis, Perlis
- Kolej Tun Dr. Ismail, a residential college at Universiti Teknologi Malaysia, Skudai, Johor
- Kolej Tun Dr. Ismail, a residential college at Universiti Tun Hussein Onn Malaysia, Batu Pahat, Johor
- Sekolah Agama Tun Dr Ismail, a religious school in Bakri, Muar, Johor
- Jalan Tun Dr Ismail, a road in Johor Bahru, Mersing, Seremban and Kuala Lumpur
- Perpustakaan Tun Dr. Ismail, UiTM Johor Kampus Pasir Gudang
- Perpustakaan Tun Dr. Ismail, UiTM Johor Kampus Segamat
- Tun Dr. Ismail International School in Johor Bahru, Johor
- MRSM Tun Dr Ismail, MARA Junior Science College in Pontian, Johor
- Dewan Tun Dr. Ismail, the school hall at St. John's Primary School, Jalan Bukit Nanas, Kuala Lumpur
- Dewan Tun Dr. Ismail, World Trade Centre Kuala Lumpur (previously known as Putra World Trade Centre)
- Kampung Kenangan Tun Dr Ismail in Muar, Johor

== In popular culture ==
Motion picture & television

- Malaysian actor Megat Shahrizal Mohd Yusof played Ismail in 2007 film 1957: Hati Malaya
- Malaysian actor Zizan Nin portrayed Ismail in 2013 film Tanda Putera and won the Best Supporting Actor award at Anugerah Skrin 2014.

== Other references ==
- Britannica entry on Tun Dr. Ismail Abdul Rahman

== Bibliography ==
- Thajunnisa Mohamed Ibrahim, Tun Dr. Ismail: Kejora timur yang mengerdip, Utusan Publications, 2004, ISBN 9676116467

Preceded by Abdul Razak Hussein	Deputy Prime Minister of Malaysia; 1970–1973	Succeeded by Hussein Onn
