= Johore Tenggara =

Johor constituency

Defunct federal constituency
- Legislature: Dewan Rakyat
- Constituency created: 1958
- Constituency abolished: 1974
- First contested: 1959
- Last contested: 1969

Johore Tenggara was a federal constituency in Johor, Malaysia, that was represented in the Dewan Rakyat from 1959 to 1974.

The federal constituency was created in the 1974 redistribution and was mandated to return a single member to the Dewan Rakyat under the first past the post voting system.

== History ==
It was abolished in 1974 when it was redistributed.

=== Representation history ===
Members of Parliament for Johore Tenggara
Parliament	No	Years	Member	Party	Vote Share
Constituency split from Johore Timor
Parliament of the Federation of Malaya
1st	P096	1959-1963	Syed Jaafar Albar (سيد جعفر البار سيد حسن البار)	Alliance (UMNO)	Uncontested
Parliament of Malaysia
1st	P096	1963-1964	Syed Jaafar Albar (سيد جعفر البار سيد حسن البار)	Alliance (UMNO)	Uncontested
2nd	P096	1964-1969	Syed Jaafar Albar (سيد جعفر البار سيد حسن البار)	Alliance (UMNO)	Uncontested
		1969-1971	Parliament was suspended		
3rd	P096	1971-1973	Syed Jaafar Albar (سيد جعفر البار سيد حسن البار)	Alliance (UMNO)	7,174; 69.50%
3rd	P096	1973-1974	Syed Jaafar Albar (سيد جعفر البار سيد حسن البار)	BN (UMNO)	7,174; 69.50%
Constituency abolished, split into Johor Bahru and Panti

=== State constituency ===
Parliamentary constituency	State constituency						
Parliamentary constituency	1954–59*	1959–1974	1974–1986	1986–1995	1995–2004	2004–2018	2018–present
Johore Tenggara		Johore Lama					
Johore Tenggara		Kota Tinggi					

=== Historical boundaries ===
State Constituency	Area
State Constituency	1959
Johore Lama	Desaru; Penawar; Pengerang; Tanjung Surat; Teluk Ramunia
Kota Tinggi	Bandar Tenggara; Kampung Makam; Kota Tinggi; Lukut Cina; Pasir Raja

== Election results ==
Malaysian general election, 1969: Johore Tenggara
Party	Candidate	Votes	%	∆%
Alliance	Syed Jaafar Hassan Albar	7,174	69.50	▲69.50
GERAKAN	Tengku Mohamed Archibald Tengku Temenggong Ahmad	3,149	30.50	▲30.50
Total valid votes		10,323	100.00	
Total rejected ballots		566		
Unreturned ballots		0		
Turnout		10,889	78.79	
Registered electors		13,821		
Majority		4,025	39.00	
Alliance hold		Swing		

Malaysian general election, 1964: Johore Tenggara
Party	Candidate	Votes	%	∆%
On the nomination day, Syed Jaafar Hassan Albar won uncontested.
Alliance	Syed Jaafar Hassan Albar			
Total valid votes			100.00	
Total rejected ballots				
Unreturned ballots				
Turnout				
Registered electors		12,854		
Majority				
Alliance hold		Swing		

Malayan general election, 1959: Johore Tenggara
Party	Candidate	Votes	%	∆%
On the nomination day, Syed Jaafar Hassan Albar won uncontested.
Alliance	Syed Jaafar Hassan Albar			
Total valid votes			100.00	
Total rejected ballots				
Unreturned ballots				
Turnout				
Registered electors		10,986		
Majority				
This was a new constituency created.
