= Makam Pahlawan =

Mausoleum in Kuala Lumpur, Malaysia

Coordinates: 3°8′31″N 101°41′26″E

Makam Pahlawan مقام ڤهلاون (Heroes Mausoleum)
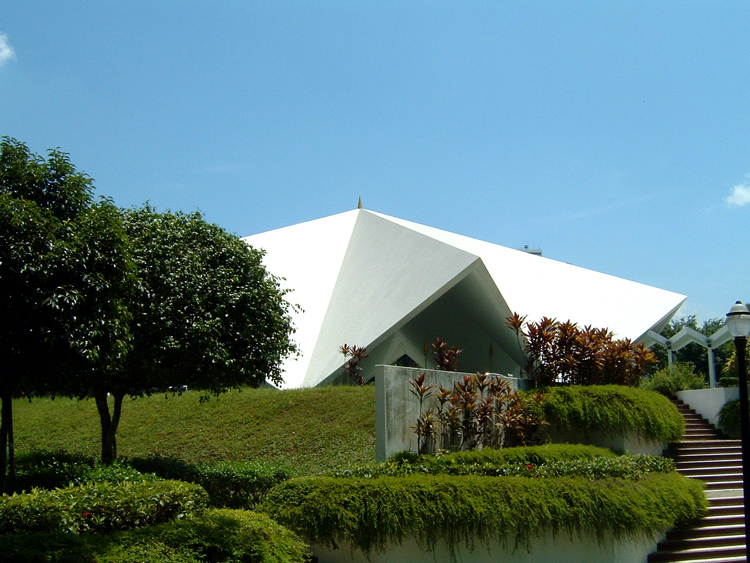

Religion
- Affiliation: Islam
- Leadership: Malaysian National Leaders

Location
- Location: Kuala Lumpur, Malaysia
- Interactive map of Makam Pahlawan مقام ڤهلاون (Heroes Mausoleum)

Architecture
- Architect: Baharuddin Abu Kassim
- Type: Mausoleum
- Style: Modern
- Groundbreaking: 1963
- Completed: 1965

Specifications
- Capacity: 7 (Inside dome)
- Dome: 1

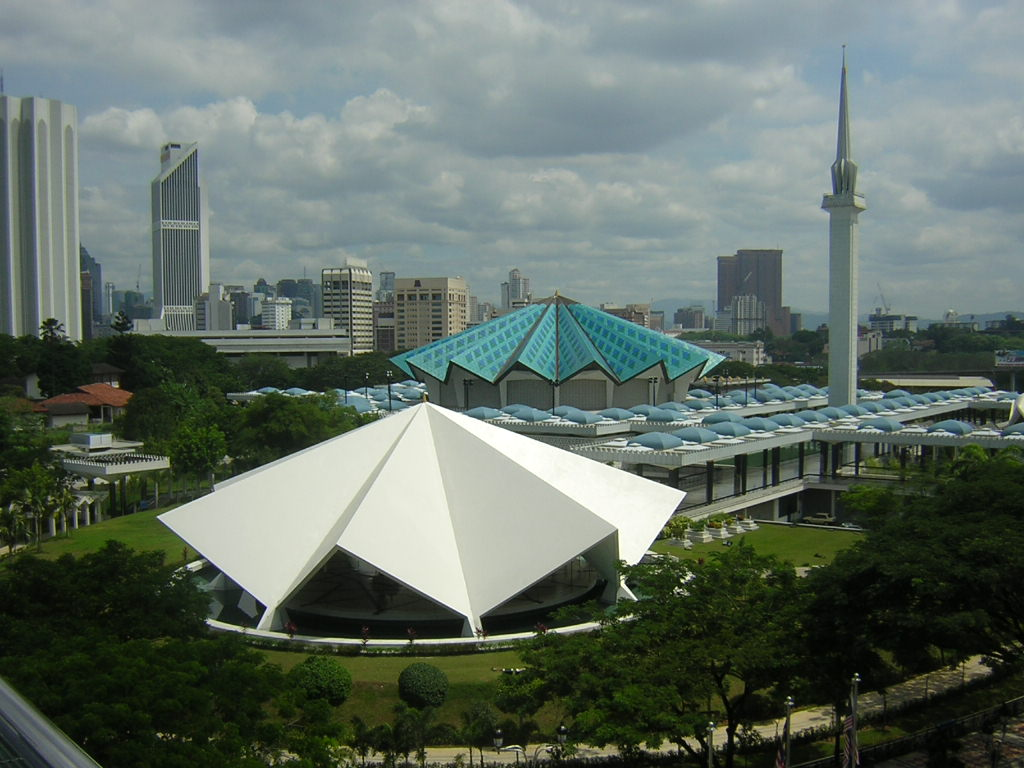
Image of Makam Pahlawan with the Masjid Negara in the background

The Makam Pahlawan (Malay for Heroes' Mausoleum) is the burial ground of several Malaysian leaders and politicians. It is located next to the Malaysian national mosque, Masjid Negara, in the national capital, Kuala Lumpur. Construction of the mausoleum began in 1963 in conjunction with the construction of Masjid Negara, and was completed in 1965.

The cemetery has an interior and an exterior. Part is covered with a concrete dome in the form of a starburst, each side of which almost touches the ground, and separated by a pond from the outside. In the centre is designed with a decorative symbol of the country, the Emblem of Malaysia (Jata Negara) and carving out new flowers marble from the island of Langkawi. The centre of the domed roof is adorned with gold coloured roses.

The Makam Pahlawan area and the Masjid Negara was gazetted in the National Heritage Act 2005 (Act 645), as a National Heritage site by the Heritage Department on 6 July 2007. The plaque installation ceremony was held on 30 April 2009.

== Burials ==
=== Inside the dome ===
- Ismail Abdul Rahman – second Deputy Prime Minister of Malaysia (died 1973)
- Abdul Razak Hussein – second Prime Minister of Malaysia, Father of Development (died 1976)
- Hussein Onn – third Prime Minister of Malaysia, Father of Unity (died 1990)
- Ghafar Baba – sixth Deputy Prime Minister of Malaysia (died 2006)
- Abdullah Ahmad Badawi – fifth Prime Minister of Malaysia (died 2025)

=== Outside the dome ===
- Syed Jaafar Albar – former UMNO Secretary-General and former Minister of Rural Development (died 1977)
- Syed Nasir Ismail – Speaker of the Dewan Rakyat (1978–82) (died 1982)
- Sardon Jubir – Governor of Penang (1975–81) and Minister of Works, Posts and Telecommunications (1957–59) (died 1985)
- Mohamed Noah Omar – Speaker of the Dewan Rakyat (1959–64) and President of the Dewan Negara (1969–70) (died 1991)
- Abdul Kadir Yusuf – Minister of Law and the Judiciary (1974–78) and Attorney General (1963–77) (died 1992)
- Mohamed Khir Johari – Minister of Education (1957–60) (died 2006)
- Fatimah Hashim – Wife of Abdul Kadir Yusuf, Welfare Minister (1970–72) (died 2010)
- Ghazali Shafie – Home Minister (1973–81) and Foreign Minister (1981–84) (died 2010)
- Omar Ong Yoke Lin – President of the Dewan Negara (1973–80) (died 2010)
- Ibrahim Ismail – retired Army General, Chief of Defence Forces (1970–77) (died 2010)
- Norashikin Mohd. Seth – widow of Tun Dr. Ismail Abdul Rahman (died 2010)
- Hamzah Abu Samah – Minister of Culture, Youth and Sports (1971–73) and member of International Olympic Committee (IOC) (1978–2004) (died 2012)
- Suhaila Mohamed Noah – widow of Hussein Onn and daughter of Mohamed Noah Omar (died 2014)
- Jamaluddin Jarjis – Minister of Science, Technology and Innovation (2004–08) and Ambassador to the United States (2009–12) (died 2015)
- Rahah Noah – widow of Abdul Razak Hussein and daughter of Mohamed Noah Omar (died 2020)
