= Fatimah Hashim =

Malaysian politician

Yang Amat Berbahagia Tun Fatimah Hashim SSM PMN
- فاطمة هاشم

Personal details
- Born: 25 December 1924 Muar, Johor, Unfederated Malay States, British Malaya (now Malaysia)
- Died: 9 January 2010 (aged 85) Kuala Lumpur, Malaysia
- Resting place: Makam Pahlawan, Masjid Negara, Kuala Lumpur
- Party: United Malays National Organisation (UMNO)
- Other political affiliations: Barisan Nasional (BN)
- Spouse: Abdul Kadir Yusof (m. 1943; died 1992)

Tun Fatimah binti Hashim (Jawi: فاطمة بنت هاشم; 25 December 1924 – 9 January 2010) was a Malaysian freedom fighter who later served as a minister in the Malaysian cabinet. Along with her husband, Tan Sri Abdul Kadir Yusof, they were the first and only couple to both be ministers in the Malaysian cabinet.

in 2009, she received the Merdeka Award under the Education and Community category.

== Political involvement ==
The petite-framed freedom fighter, who was the United Malays National Organisation's (UMNO) 315th member, joined the struggle for independence when she was in her 20s. She was head of Kaum Ibu Malaya, later known as Wanita Umno, which is the women's wing of the UMNO. She was the movement's leader for 16 years until 1972.

She saw then that there were inadequate facilities and infrastructure for the people under colonial rule, especially for health care and education. She recalled that during her visits to Kota Bharu, she had to wait for the water level to subside before she could cross the river to visit villagers because there were no bridges. Fatimah said that working alongside luminaries such as Tunku Abdul Rahman, Tan Khir Johari and Tun Abdul Razak was a great experience, and they treated each other like family.

From an interview in the Malaysian newspaper The Star:

...I was like a kakak to Senu and adik to Khir Johari. Tunku was like a father to us. We did not fight for independence for the sake of fame. It was for our country.

== Achieving independence ==
On Hari Merdeka (Independence Day), 31 August 1957, Fatimah traveled with her three eldest children her husband, the late Tan Sri Abdul Kadir Yusuf, in a car from Ipoh to Kuala Lumpur to celebrate Malaya's emergence from British rule. Fatimah attended the ceremony at Stadium Merdeka with her husband. They stayed at the late Tun Sardon Jubir's house in Kuala Lumpur and the couple took the children around the city.

From The Star interview, she said:

I could not sleep the night before. We had an UMNO ceremony at the Royal Selangor Club field and then went to the stadium in the morning. I felt so proud of what we had achieved. I can still see Tunku at the podium crying out 'Merdeka!'.

She cried that day in the stadium.

== Post-independence ==
After independence, her husband continued to encourage her to be involved in politics. Abdul Kadir Yusuf, who was then Attorney-General, was in government service and could not be active in politics. He advised her not to sit at home but to continue fighting and help the poor.

He said that if I wanted to see change, I had to be active and that I had to have a voice in Parliament if I wanted to improve the status of women.

He became her driver and accompanied her to meetings, something that Tun Abdul Razak used to tease the couple about.

Fatimah served as Member of Parliament and later as Welfare Minister in the Malaysian cabinet. At the same time, her husband became the Law Minister, making them the only couple to serve together in the Cabinet of Malaysia.

== Social contributions ==
Fatimah was the founder and former president of the Malaysia's National Council of Women's Organisations, where she headed the organisation for 24 years.

== Family ==
The former Welfare Services minister had six children, 19 grandchildren and 11 great grandchildren.

Her eldest daughter, Mariam, was the Director-General of the National Library of Malaysia and is now retired. Her second son, Mohamed Shah, has now retired as Chairman of McDonald's Malaysia (division of McDonald's), and founder of Ronald McDonald's Charity Club (RMCC) Malaysia. Her third son, Dato Professor Emeritus Dr Khalid Abdul Kadir was previously the director of Hospital Universiti Kebangsaan Malaysia, Kuala Lumpur, and is now the Head of Clinical School at Monash University Malaysia. Her fourth son Datuk Ali Abdul Kadir is an accomplished accountant who has held such prestigious positions as chairman of Ernst & Young Malaysia, a short stint as chairman of the Securities Commission, and recently retired as Chairman of Dubai Investment Group's Malaysian division. Her fifth son Abdul Karim is in business and adviser to a few public and private companies. Faridah, her youngest daughter is also an adviser to a Denmark based investment bank.

== Foundation and tribute ==
The Kadir and Fatimah Foundation recently started conferring the Tun Fatimah Award medal for the best female student active in community work for the first time in September 2007 and will be awarded annually to Universiti Malaya, Universiti Teknologi Mara and Universiti Teknologi Malaysia students. The first recipient was Sharifah Fatimah Syed Omar of Kuala Terengganu.

== Death ==
Tun Fatimah Hashim died from old age on 9 January 2010. Her body was laid to rest at Makam Pahlawan in the Masjid Negara compounds beside her husband, Tan Sri Abdul Kadir Yusuf's grave. She was the first woman leader laid to rest there.

== Honours ==
=== Honours of Malaysia ===
- Malaya
  - Commander of the Order of the Defender of the Realm (PMN) – Tan Sri (1958)
- Malaysia
  - Recipient of the Malaysian Commemorative Medal (Gold) (PPM) (1965)
  - Grand Commander of the Order of Loyalty to the Crown of Malaysia (SSM) – Tun (2003)
