= Ibrahim Ismail (general) =

5th Chief of the Malaysian Defence Forces

Yang Amat Berbahagia General (Rtd) Tun Dato' Sir Ibrahim Ismail SSM PMN SPMJ SPMK PNBS DIMP PGDK PIS KBE
- إبراهيم إسماعيل

5th Chief of Defence Forces
- In office 1 July 1970 – 30 November 1977
- Preceded by: Abdul Hamid Bidin
- Succeeded by: Mohd Sany Abdul Ghaffar

Personal details
- Born: Ibrahim bin Ismail; 19 October 1922 Johor Bahru, Johor, British Malaya (now Malaysia)
- Died: 23 December 2010 (aged 88) Kuala Lumpur, Malaysia
- Resting place: Makam Pahlawan, Masjid Negara, Kuala Lumpur
- Spouse: Zakiah Ahmad (m. 1949)
- Children: 4
- Education: English College Johore Bahru; Indian Military Academy
- Occupation: Senior military officer, secret agent, businessman
- Civilian awards: Grand Commander of the Order of Loyalty to the Crown of Malaysia (SSM); Commander of the Order of the Defender of the Realm (PMN)

Military service
- Allegiance: Malaysia; United Kingdom
- Branch/service: Johor Military Force; British Indian Army; Special Operations Executive; Malaysian Army
- Years of service: 1941–1977
- Rank: General
- Unit: Johor Volunteer Forces; 19th Hyderabad Regiment; Force 136
- Commands: 6th Bn, Royal Malay Regiment; 5th Infantry Brigade; 1st Infantry Division
- Battles/wars: World War II; Malayan Emergency; Indonesia–Malaysia confrontation; 2nd Malayan Emergency
- Military awards: Knight Commander of the Order of the British Empire (KBE); Member of the Order of the British Empire (MBE)

Sir Ibrahim bin Ismail (Jawi: إبراهيم بن إسماعيل; 19 October 1922 – 23 December 2010) was a Malaysian soldier who served in the British Special Operations Executive (SOE) during World War II, subsequently rising to the post of Chief of the Malaysian Defence Forces from 1970 until 1977. He was the first Chief of the Defence Forces to be granted the honorific title "Tun".

== Biography ==
Ibrahim was born in Johor Bahru, at the southern tip of the Malayan Peninsula. He graduated from the Indian Military Academy at Dehradun and was commissioned into the British Indian Army following the Japanese invasion of Malaya.

He was recruited into "Force 136", the cover name for the SOE in the Far East. In October 1944 he and two colleagues were parachuted onto the western coast of Terengganu as part of "Operation Oatmeal". Their location was betrayed and they were soon captured by the Japanese – along with their codebook. After a month's interrogation, they agreed to turn double agent, but managed to inform SOE of their situation, effectively becoming triple agents.

Their disinformation led the Japanese to believe the land assault on Malaya – Operation Zipper – would occur on the Kra Isthmus, 650 miles (1,050 km) to the north of its actual location. Japan surrendered before the landings, and Ibrahim informed his captors that his religion would not permit him to commit hara-kiri with them. For his actions Captain Ibrahim was made a Member of the Order of the British Empire (MBE) in November 1946.

Post-war, Ibrahim joined the Sultan of Johore's Royal Johor Military Force (JMF), transferring to the Malay Regiment in 1951. He commanded the 6th Battalion, Royal Malay Regiment from 1958, and was promoted to Brigadier in 1962. He served as Director of Administration in the Federation Army, and then commanded the 5th Infantry Brigade, and was GOC of the 1st Infantry Division from 1966. He was involved in the suppression of the May 1969 riots and was a member of the ruling National Operations Council between 1969 and 1971. With the rank of General he then served as Chief of the Defence Forces until his retirement in 1977. In 1984 he published his wartime memoirs Have You Met Mariam?

In 2000 Ibrahim was appointed a Grand Commander of the Order of Loyalty to the Crown of Malaysia, and received the honorific title "Tun".

Tun Ibrahim died at Tuanku Mizan Armed Forces Hospital, Kuala Lumpur on 23 December 2010. His body was laid to rest at Makam Pahlawan near Masjid Negara, Kuala Lumpur. He was the first military person laid to rest there.

== Honours ==
=== Honours of Malaysia ===
- Malaysia
  - Companion of the Order of the Defender of the Realm (JMN) (1964)
  - Commander of the Order of the Defender of the Realm (PMN) – Tan Sri (1970)
  - Grand Commander of the Order of Loyalty to the Crown of Malaysia (SSM) – Tun (2000)
- Johor
  - Sultan Ibrahim Medal (PIS) (1949)
  - Knight Commander of the Order of the Crown of Johor (DPMJ) – Dato' (1964)
  - Knight Grand Commander of the Order of the Crown of Johor (SPMJ) – Dato' (1972)
- Pahang
  - Knight Companion of the Order of the Crown of Pahang (DIMP) – Dato' (1971)
- Kelantan
  - Knight Grand Commander of the Order of the Crown of Kelantan (SPMK) – Dato'
- Sabah
  - Commander of the Order of Kinabalu (PGDK) – Datuk (1965)
- Sarawak
  - Knight Commander of the Order of the Star of Sarawak (PNBS) – formerly Dato', now Dato Sri

=== Foreign Honours ===
- United Kingdom
  - Member of the Order of the British Empire (MBE) (1946)
  - Knight Commander of the Order of the British Empire (KBE) - Sir
- Indonesia
  - Grand Meritorious Military Order Star, 1 Class (1971)
