= National Operations Council =

Former special administration body in Malaysia

- Majlis Gerakan Negara
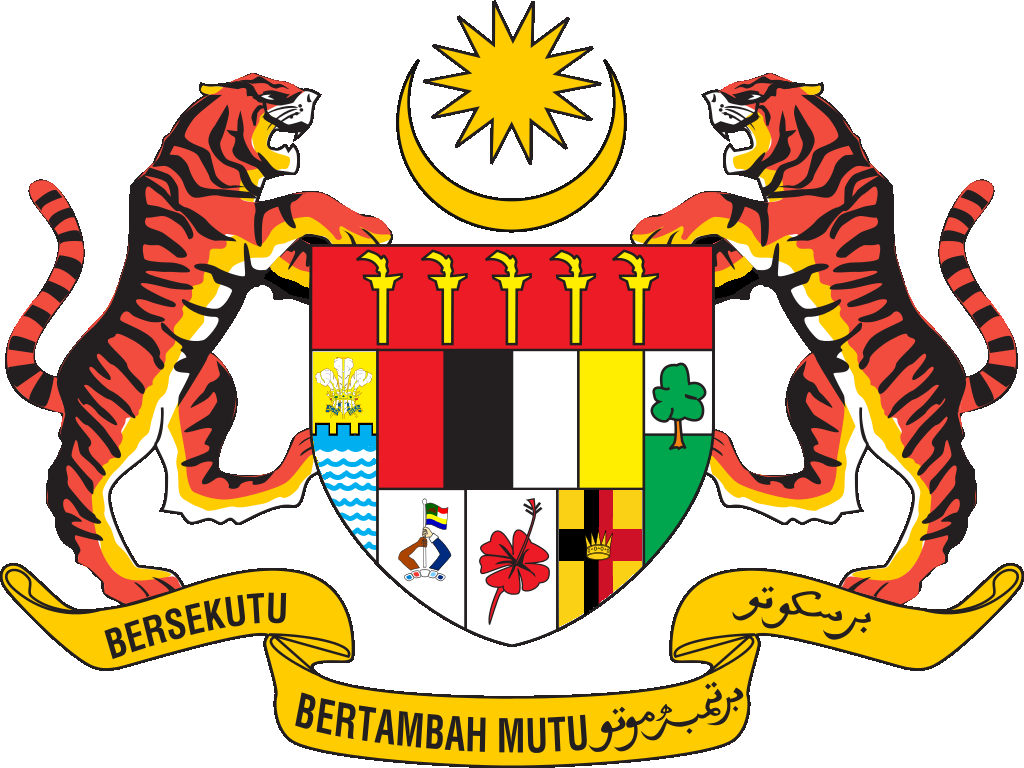

- The National Operations Council governed the country in lieu of the elected government.

Agency overview
- Formed: 15 May 1969
- Preceding agency: Third Rahman cabinet
- Dissolved: 20 February 1971
- Superseding agency: First Razak cabinet
- Type: Junta
- Jurisdiction: Malaysia
- Status: Dissolved
- Prime Minister of Malaysia responsible: Tunku Abdul Rahman
- Agency executives: Abdul Razak Hussein, Director of Operations; Gen. Ibrahim Ismail, Chief Executive Officer

The National Operations Council (NOC) or Majlis Gerakan Negara (MAGERAN) was an emergency administrative body which attempted to restore law and order in Malaysia after the 13 May incident in 1969, in the wake of the racial rioting which broke out in the federal capital of Kuala Lumpur.

The NOC was announced on 15 May 1969, with Abdul Razak Hussein as Director of Operations, although the other council members were not announced until 17 May. From 1969 to 1971, the NOC governed the country in lieu of the elected government. In 1971, the NOC was dissolved with the restoration of Parliament.

== Members of the Council ==
The Director of Operations of NOC was Abdul Razak Hussein. The Prime Minister Tunku Abdul Rahman was not formally a member, but was consulted on major decisions for approval.

=== Council Members ===
- Minister of Home Affairs — Ismail Abdul Rahman
- Minister of Finance — Tan Siew Sin
- Minister of Works, Post & Telecoms — V. T. Sambanthan
- Minister of Information & Broadcasting — Hamzah Abu Samah
- Director-General of Public Services Department and later Chief Secretary to the Government - Tan Sri Abdul Kadir Shamsuddin
- Chief of Armed Forces Staff — Tunku Osman
- Inspector-General of Police — Mohamed Salleh Ismael
- Permanent Secretary, Ministry of Foreign Affairs — Ghazali Shafie

=== The Chief Executive Officer ===
- Director of Operations, West Malaysia — Ibrahim Ismail

=== Assistants ===
- Deputy Secretary, Ministry of Defence — Enche Abdul Rahman Hamidon
- Ministry of Defence — Lt. Col. Mohd Ghazali Che Mat
- Royal Malaysia Police — Superintendent Mohammed Hanif Omar
- Attorney-General's Office — Enche Yusoff bin Abdul Rashid
