= Mohamed Tawfik Ismail =

Malaysian politician (1951)

- محمد تاوفيك اسماعيل

Member of Parliament for Sungai Benut
- In office 3 August 1986 – 21 October 1990
- Monarchs: Iskandar of Johor (1986–1989); Azlan Shah of Perak (1989–1990)
- Prime Minister: Mahathir Mohamad
- Preceded by: Constituency created
- Succeeded by: Abdul Hamid Abdul Rahman (BN–UMNO)

Personal details
- Born: Mohamed Tawfik bin Ismail; 23 September 1951 (age 75) Johor, Malaysia
- Party: Independent (2009–present); United Malays National Organisation (UMNO) (1986–2009)
- Other political affiliations: Barisan Nasional (BN) (1986–2009)
- Parent(s): Ismail Abdul Rahman (father); Norashikin Mohd Seth (mother)
- Education: St John's Institution; Royal Military College; Geelong Grammar School; University of New England; University of Oxford
- Occupation: Politician; Author

Mohamed Tawfik bin Ismail (Jawi: محمد تاوفيك بن اسماعيل, Malay pronunciation: [tao.feek]; born 23 September 1951) is a Malaysian politician who served as a Member of Parliament (MP) for Sungai Benut from August 1986 to October 1990. He was a member of the United Malays National Organisation (UMNO), a component party of the BN coalition and was the former Vice Division Chief of UMNO Sungai Benut. He is the eldest son of the 2nd Deputy Prime Minister of Malaysia, Ismail Abdul Rahman.

== Early life and education ==
Tawfik was born on 23 September 1951 and studied at St John's Institution in Kuala Lumpur during his early schooling days. He then went to the Royal Military College (RMC) and finally finishing his secondary education at Geelong Grammar School in Australia. He then furthered his tertiary studies in Australia and England where he graduated at the University of New England and the University of Oxford respectfully.

== Political career ==
Tawfik was touted as a political successor for his late father in Johor, where he was then elected as a Member of Parliament (MP) representing one of the constituencies in the state. However, his term ended after only one term, where he was known to have a progressive stance and his conflicting views with the UMNO president at that time, Mahathir Mohamad.

Tawfik then quit UMNO in 2009 and later formed the Pertubuhan Gerak Independent in 2019, a movement that supports independent candidates for elections. After an almost four decade hiatus from being in parliament, Tawfik contested in the 2022 Malaysian general election as an independent candidate for the Bagan Datuk constituency, to directly challenge Ahmad Zahid Hamidi, the President of UMNO and Chairman of Barisan Nasional. He eventually lost the seat and his deposit with only 226 votes garnered.

During his years being absent in politics, Tawfik was active in the corporate sector while had stints in leading TV3 Task Force, Bank of Commerce, Malayawata Steel Corporation, and PERNAS-OUE. Tawfik has also published books which are memoirs about his father titled "Drifting into Politics: The Unfinished Memoirs of Tun Dr Ismail Abdul Rahman" with Ooi Kee Beng and "Malaya's First Year at the United Nations: As Reflected in Dr Ismail's Reports Home to Tunku Abdul Rahman".

== Election results ==
Parliament of Malaysia
Year	Constituency	Candidate	Votes	Pct	Opponent	Votes	Pct	Ballots cast	Majority	Turnout
1986	P126 Sungai Benut, Johor	Mohamed Tawfik Ismail (UMNO)	25,482	80.72%	Abd Hamid Abd Rahim (PAS)	6,088	19.28%	33.008	19,394	61.44%

== Publications ==
- Malaya's First Year at the United Nations: As Reflected in Dr Ismail's Reports Home to Tunku Abdul Rahman. (2008)
- Drifting into Politics: The Unfinished Memoirs of Tun Dr Ismail Abdul Rahman. (2015)
