= Ghazali Shafie =

Malaysian politician (1922–2010)

Allahyarham Tun Dato' Sri Muhammad Ghazali Shafie SSM SSAP SPDK SSSA PSLJ PMN MVM SIMP DA DIMP SMP PPM
- محمد غزالي شافعي

Minister of Foreign Affairs
- In office 17 July 1981 – 16 July 1984
- Monarchs: Ahmad Shah; Iskandar
- Prime Minister: Mahathir Mohamad
- Deputy: Mokhtar Hashim (1981–1983); Abdul Kadir Sheikh Fadzir (1983–1984)
- Preceded by: Tengku Ahmad Rithauddeen Tengku Ismail
- Succeeded by: Tengku Ahmad Rithauddeen Tengku Ismail
- Constituency: Lipis

Minister of Home Affairs
- In office 13 August 1973 – 16 July 1981
- Monarchs: Abdul Halim; Yahya Petra; Ahmad Shah
- Prime Minister: Abdul Razak Hussein; Hussein Onn
- Deputy: Abdul Samad Idris (1973–1976); Shariff Ahmad (1976–1978); Rais Yatim (1978); Syed Ahmad Syed Mahmud Shahabuddin (1978–1980); Sanusi Junid (1980–1981)
- Preceded by: Ismail Abdul Rahman
- Succeeded by: Musa Hitam
- Constituency: Lipis

Minister of Information Minister with Special Functions
- In office 22 April 1971 – 24 August 1974
- Monarch: Abdul Halim
- Prime Minister: Abdul Razak Hussein
- Deputy: Shariff Ahmad (1973–1974)
- Preceded by: Hamzah Abu Samah as Minister of Information and Broadcasting
- Succeeded by: Tengku Ahmad Rithauddeen Tengku Ismail
- Constituency: Senator; Lipis

Secretary-General of the Ministry of Foreign Affairs
- In office 12 February 1959 – 21 September 1970
- Preceded by: Nik Ahmad Kamil Nik Mahmud
- Succeeded by: Zaiton Ibrahim Ahmad

Personal details
- Born: 22 March 1922 Kuala Lipis, Pahang, Federated Malay States, British Malaya (now Malaysia)
- Died: 24 January 2010 (aged 87) Subang Jaya, Selangor, Malaysia
- Resting place: Makam Pahlawan, Masjid Negara, Kuala Lumpur
- Party: United Malays National Organisation (UMNO)
- Other political affiliations: Barisan Nasional (BN)
- Spouse: Khatijah Abdul Majid
- Children: 2
- Education: University College of Wales; London School of Economics

Muhammad Ghazali bin Shafie (Jawi: محمد غزالي بن شافعي; 22 March 1922 – 24 January 2010) was a Malaysian politician and diplomat. He served under the administrations of four Prime Ministers, most notably as Minister of Home and Foreign Affairs from 1973 to 1984.

== Biography ==
Ghazali was born in 1922 in Kuala Lipis, Pahang. He was of Minangkabau descent from Rao, West Sumatra. He was part of the clandestine resistance to the Japanese occupation of Malaya in World War II. He then studied at the University of Wales and the London School of Economics.

During the Malayan Emergency, Ghazali fully supported British military attempts to crush a pro-independence uprising led by the Malayan National Liberation Army (MNLA), the armed wing of the Malayan Communist Party (MCP). Writing in The Times newspaper, Ghazali openly supported the killing and public display of the corpses of people suspected to have been members of the MNLA.

After a career in the civil service, Ghazali entered politics. He served as Home and Information Minister from 1973 to 1981, and was then appointed Foreign Minister until 1984. He represented the Parliamentary seat of Lipis from 1974, before which he was a member of the Dewan Negara (upper house of parliament). As Foreign Minister, he was known for his role in ASEAN's diplomacy in respect of conflict in Cambodia. Described as a "flamboyant politician", his nickname was "King Ghaz".

On 11 January 1982, Ghazali survived an aeroplane crash in which he was the pilot. His bodyguard and co-pilot were killed. There had been reports (for example in the New York Times) that Ghazali had been killed in the crash. A coroner later blamed the accident on what the coroner found to be Ghazali's negligence.

After leaving politics, he held a range of positions in the corporate sector and with international organisations.

Ghazali died on 24 January 2010 at 7.45pm, at his home in Subang Jaya. His wife, Toh Puan Khatijah Abdul Majid, died in April 2008. They are survived by his two sons, Bachtiar and Sheriffudin. He was buried at Makam Pahlawan, Masjid Negara, Kuala Lumpur.

== Election results ==
Parliament of Malaysia
Year	Constituency	Candidate	Votes	Pct	Opponent(s)	Votes	Pct	Ballots cast	Majority	Turnout
1972	P064 Lipis	Ghazali Shafie (UMNO)	15,702	81.33%	Tengku Kamarulzaman Tengku Hamid (PMIP)	3,605	18.67%		12,097	
1974	P065 Lipis	Ghazali Shafie (UMNO)	Unopposed							
1978	P065 Lipis	Ghazali Shafie (UMNO)	14,778	69.92%	Kasim Yahya (PMIP)	3,199	15.13%		11,579	
1978	P065 Lipis	Ghazali Shafie (UMNO)	14,778	69.92%	Wan Abdul Rahman Wan Ibrahim (IND)	3,160	14.95%		11,579	
1982	P065 Lipis	Ghazali Shafie (UMNO)	15,094	61.07%	S. Nadarajan (DAP)	5,477	22.16%	25,703	9,617	70.74%
1982	P065 Lipis	Ghazali Shafie (UMNO)	15,094	61.07%	Kasim Yahya (PAS)	4,145	16.77%	25,703	9,617	70.74%

== Honours ==
=== Honours of Malaysia ===
- Malaysia
  - Grand Commander of the Order of Loyalty to the Crown of Malaysia (SSM) – Tun (2005)
  - Commander of the Order of the Defender of the Realm (PMN) – Tan Sri (1965)
  - Recipient of the Malaysian Commemorative Medal (Gold) (PPM) (1965)
- Pahang
  - Grand Knight of the Order of Sultan Ahmad Shah of Pahang (SSAP) – Dato' Sri
  - Grand Knight of the Order of the Crown of Pahang (SIMP) – formerly Dato', now Dato' Indera (1972)
  - Knight Companion of the Order of the Crown of Pahang (DIMP) – Dato' (1970)
  - Companion of the Order of the Crown of Pahang (SMP) (1968)
- Sabah
  - Grand Commander of the Order of Kinabalu (SPDK) – Datuk Seri Panglima
- Sarawak
  - Knight Commander of the Order of the Star of Hornbill Sarawak (DA) – Datuk Amar (1988)
- Selangor
  - Knight Grand Companion of the Order of Sultan Salahuddin Abdul Aziz Shah (SSSA) – Dato' Seri (1985)

=== Foreign Honours ===
- Brunei
  - Grand Commander of the Order of Paduka Seri Laila Jasa (PSLJ) – Dato Paduka Seri Laila Jasa (2002)
- Thailand
  - Knight Grand Cordon of Order of the Crown of Thailand (MVM) (1983)
- South Vietnam
  - Grand Officer of the National Order of Vietnam (1965)

=== Places named after him ===
- MRSM Tun Ghazali Shafie, a MARA institutional boarding school in Kuala Lipis, Pahang
- Ghazali Shafie Graduate School Research Institute, Universiti Utara Malaysia, Kedah
- Ghazali Shafie Graduate School of Government, Universiti Utara Malaysia, Kedah
