= Sungai Benut =

Johor constituency

Defunct federal constituency
- Legislature: Dewan Rakyat
- Constituency created: 1984
- Constituency abolished: 2004
- First contested: 1986
- Last contested: 1999

Sungai Benut was a federal constituency in Johor, Malaysia, that was represented in the Dewan Rakyat from 1986 to 2004.

The federal constituency was created in the 1984 redistribution and was mandated to return a single member to the Dewan Rakyat under the first past the post voting system.

== History ==
It was abolished in 2004 when it was redistributed.

=== Representation history ===
Members of Parliament for Sungai Benut
Parliament	No	Years	Member	Party	Vote Share
Constituency created from Ayer Hitam, Sri Gading, Kluang, Renggam and Pontian
7th	P126	1986-1990	Mohamed Tawfik Ismail (محمد توفيق إسماعيل)	BN (UMNO)	25,482; 80.72%
8th	P126	1990-1995	Abdul Hamid Abdul Rahman (عبدالحميد عبدالرحمٰن)	BN (UMNO)	23,313; 68.06%
9th	P137	1995-1999	Abdul Hamid Abdul Rahman (عبدالحميد عبدالرحمٰن)	BN (UMNO)	29,450; 79.66%
10th	P137	1999-2004	Abdul Hamid Abdul Rahman (عبدالحميد عبدالرحمٰن)	BN (UMNO)	30,578; 75.57%
Constituency abolished, split into Simpang Renggam and Pontian

=== State constituency ===
Parliamentary constituency	State constituency						
Parliamentary constituency	1954–59*	1959–1974	1974–1986	1986–1995	1995–2004	2004–2018	2018–present
Sungai Benut				Benut			
Sungai Benut				Simpang Renggam			

=== Historical boundaries ===
State Constituency	Area	
State Constituency	1984	1994
Benut	Ayer Baloi; Benut; Kampong Parit Mastar; Kampong Parit Satu; Sanglang	
Simpang Renggam	FELDA Ayer Hitam; Kampung Melayu Bukit Nyamuk; Layang-Layang; Renggam; Simpang Renggam	

== Election results ==
Malaysian general election, 1999: Sungai Benut
Party	Candidate	Votes	%	∆%
BN	Abdul Hamid Abdul Rahman	30,578	75.57	▼4.09
PAS	Ungku Mohd Noor Ungku Mahmood	9,886	24.43	▲4.09
Total valid votes		40,464	100.00	
Total rejected ballots		1,291		
Unreturned ballots		89		
Turnout		41,844	72.58	▼2.17
Registered electors		57,646		
Majority		20,692	51.14	▼8.09
BN hold		Swing		

Malaysian general election, 1995: Sungai Benut
Party	Candidate	Votes	%	∆%
BN	Abdul Hamid Abdul Rahman	29,450	79.66	▲11.60
S46	Hassan Md. Ali	7,519	20.34	▼11.60
Total valid votes		36,969	100.00	
Total rejected ballots		2,154		
Unreturned ballots		301		
Turnout		39,424	74.75	▲2.51
Registered electors		54,894		
Majority		21,931	59.32	▲23.20
BN hold		Swing		

Malaysian general election, 1990: Sungai Benut
Party	Candidate	Votes	%	∆%
BN	Abdul Hamid Abdul Rahman	23,313	68.06	▼12.66
S46	Mohamed Sadek Mambli	10,943	31.94	▲31.94
Total valid votes		34,256	100.00	
Total rejected ballots		2,014		
Unreturned ballots		0		
Turnout		36,270	72.24	▲1.60
Registered electors		50,209		
Majority		12,370	36.12	▼25.32
BN hold		Swing		

Malaysian general election, 1986: Sungai Benut
Party	Candidate	Votes	%
BN	Mohamed Tawfik Ismail	25,482	80.72
PAS	Abd Hamid Abd Rahim	6,088	19.28
Total valid votes		31,570	100.00
Total rejected ballots		1,438	
Unreturned ballots		0	
Turnout		33,008	70.64
Registered electors		46,727	
Majority		19,394	61.44
This was a new constituency created.
