= Tenggaroh (federal constituency) =

Johor constituency

Defunct federal constituency
- Legislature: Dewan Rakyat
- Constituency created: 1974
- Constituency abolished: 1986
- First contested: 1974
- Last contested: 1982

Tenggaroh was a federal constituency in Johor, Malaysia, that was represented in the Dewan Rakyat from 1974 to 1986.

The federal constituency was created in the 1974 redistribution and was mandated to return a single member to the Dewan Rakyat under the first past the post voting system.

== History ==
It was abolished in 1986 when it was redistributed.

=== Representation history ===
Members of Parliament for Tenggaroh
Parliament	No	Years	Member	Party	Vote Share
Constituency created, renamed from Johore Timor
4th	P102	1974-1978	Abdul Kadir Yusuf (عبدالقادر يوسف)	BN (UMNO)	Uncontested
5th	P102	1978-1982	Abdul Kadir Yusuf (عبدالقادر يوسف)	BN (UMNO)	10,886; 73.26%
6th	P102	1982-1986	Khadri Sabran (خادري سبرن)	BN (UMNO)	14,093; 84.79%
Constituency abolished, renamed to Mersing

=== State constituency ===
Parliamentary constituency	State constituency						
Parliamentary constituency	1954–59*	1959–1974	1974–1986	1986–1995	1995–2004	2004–2018	2018–present
Tenggaroh			Endau				
Tenggaroh			Mersing				

=== Historical boundaries ===
State Constituency	Area
State Constituency	1974
Endau	Air Papan; FELDA Endau; Endau; Kahang; Tenglu
Mersing	FELDA Tenggaroh; FELDA Nitar; Jemaluang; Mersing; Teluk Iskandar

== Election results ==
Malaysian general election, 1982
Party	Candidate	Votes	%	∆%
BN	Khadri Sabran	14,093	84.79	▲11.53
PAS	Mokhtar Yahya	2,528	15.21	▼11.53
Total valid votes		16,621	100.00	
Total rejected ballots		856		
Unreturned ballots		0		
Turnout		17,477	71.47	▼4.93
Registered electors		24,453		
Majority		11,565	69.58	▲10.00
BN hold		Swing		

Malaysian general election, 1978
Party	Candidate	Votes	%	∆%
BN	Abdul Kadir Yusuf	10,886	73.26	▲73.26
DAP	Tan Tien Lim	2,568	17.28	▲17.28
PAS	Abdul Rauof Abdul Majid	1,405	9.46	
Total valid votes		14,859	100.00	
Total rejected ballots		1,088		
Unreturned ballots		0		
Turnout		33,869	76.40	
Registered electors		20,308		
Majority		8,318	55.98	
BN hold		Swing		

Malaysian general election, 1974
Party	Candidate	Votes	%	∆%
On the nomination day, Abdul Kadir Yusuf won uncontested.
BN	Abdul Kadir Yusuf			
Total valid votes			100.00	
Total rejected ballots				
Unreturned ballots				
Turnout				
Registered electors		17,274		
Majority				
This was a new constituency created.
