= Panti (federal constituency) =

Johor constituency

Defunct federal constituency
- Legislature: Dewan Rakyat
- Constituency created: 1974
- Constituency abolished: 1986
- First contested: 1974
- Last contested: 1982

Panti was a federal constituency in Johor, Malaysia, that was represented in the Dewan Rakyat from 1974 to 1986.

The federal constituency was created in the 1974 redistribution and was mandated to return a single member to the Dewan Rakyat under the first past the post voting system.

== History ==
It was abolished in 1986 when it was redistributed.

=== Representation history ===
Members of Parliament for Panti
Parliament	No	Years	Member	Party	Vote Share
Constituency created from Johore Tenggara and Johore Timor
4th	P108	1974-1977	Syed Jaafar Albar (سيد جعفر البر)	BN (UMNO)	Uncontested
4th	P108	1977-1978	Saadun Muhammad Noh (سعداون محمد نوه)	BN (UMNO)	Uncontested
5th	P108	1978-1982	Yusof Malim Kuning (يوسف ماليم كونيڠ)	BN (UMNO)	22,807; 90.10%
6th	P108	1982-1986	Musa Hitam (موسى هيتم)	BN (UMNO)	Uncontested
Constituency abolished, split into Kota Tinggi and Senai

=== State constituency ===
Parliamentary constituency	State constituency						
Parliamentary constituency	1954–59*	1959–1974	1974–1986	1986–1995	1995–2004	2004–2018	2018–present
Panti			Johore Lama				
Panti			Kota Tinggi				

=== Historical boundaries ===
State Constituency	Area
State Constituency	1974
Johore Lama	Desaru; FELDA Aping; FELDA Lok Heng; FELDA Sungai Ara; Pengerang
Kota Tinggi	Bandar Tenggara; FELDA Bukit Besar; FELDA Linggiu; FELDA Pasir Raja; Kota Tinggi

== Election results ==
Malaysian general election, 1982
Party	Candidate	Votes	%	∆%
On the nomination day, Musa Hitam won uncontested.
BN	Musa Hitam			
Total valid votes			100.00	
Total rejected ballots				
Unreturned ballots				
Turnout				
Registered electors		50,024		
Majority				
BN hold		Swing		

Malaysian general election, 1978
Party	Candidate	Votes	%	∆%
BN	Yusof Malim Kuning	22,807	90.10	▲90.10
PAS	Abdul Wahab Abdul Malik	2,507	9.90	▲9.90
Total valid votes		25,314	100.00	
Total rejected ballots		1,023		
Unreturned ballots		0		
Turnout		26,337	80.38	
Registered electors		32,767		
Majority		20,300	80.20	
BN hold		Swing		

Malaysian general by-election, 24 February 1977 Upon the death of incumbent, Syed Jaafar Hassan Albar
Party	Candidate	Votes	%	∆%
On the nomination day, Saadun Muhammad Noh won uncontested.
BN	Saadun Muhammad Noh			
Total valid votes			100.00	
Total rejected ballots				
Unreturned ballots				
Turnout				
Registered electors				
Majority				
BN hold		Swing		

Malaysian general election, 1974
Party	Candidate	Votes	%	∆%
On the nomination day, Syed Jaafar Hassan Albar won uncontested.
BN	Syed Jaafar Hassan Albar			
Total valid votes			100.00	
Total rejected ballots				
Unreturned ballots				
Turnout				
Registered electors		19,595		
Majority				
This was a new constituency created.
