= Johore Timor (federal constituency) =

Johor constituency

Defunct federal constituency
- Legislature: Dewan Rakyat
- Constituency created: 1955
- Constituency abolished: 1974
- First contested: 1955
- Last contested: 1969

Johore Timor was a federal constituency in Johor, Malaysia, that was represented in the Dewan Rakyat from 1955 to 1974.

The federal constituency was created in the 1955 redistribution and was mandated to return a single member to the Dewan Rakyat under the first past the post voting system.

== History ==
It was abolished in 1974 when it was redistributed.

=== Representation history ===
Members of Parliament for Johore Timor
Parliament	No	Years	Member	Party	Vote Share
Constituency created
Federal Legislative Council
1st		1955-1959	Ismail Abdul Rahman (إسماعيل عبدالرحمٰن)	Alliance (UMNO)	10,800; 94.71%
Parliament of the Federation of Malaya
1st	P102	1959-1963	Ismail Abdul Rahman (إسماعيل عبدالرحمٰن)	Alliance (UMNO)	10,800; 94.71%
Parliament of Malaysia
1st	P102	1963-1964	Ismail Abdul Rahman (إسماعيل عبدالرحمٰن)	Alliance (UMNO)	7,087; 79.26%
2nd	P102	1964–1969	Ismail Abdul Rahman (إسماعيل عبدالرحمٰن)	Alliance (UMNO)	10,331; 91.91%
		1969-1971	Parliament was suspended		
3rd	P102	1971-1973	Ismail Abdul Rahman (إسماعيل عبدالرحمٰن)	Alliance (UMNO)	9,689; 80.02%
3rd	P102	1973	Ismail Abdul Rahman (إسماعيل عبدالرحمٰن)	BN (UMNO)	9,689; 80.02%
3rd	P102	1973-1974	Abdul Rahman Sabri (عبدالرحمٰن صبري)	BN (UMNO)	Uncontested
Constituency abolished, split into Tenggaroh and Panti

=== State constituency ===
Parliamentary constituency	State constituency						
Parliamentary constituency	1954–59*	1959–1974	1974–1986	1986–1995	1995–2004	2004–2018	2018–present
Johore Timor		Endau					
Johore Timor	Kota Tinggi						
Johore Timor	Mersing						

=== Historical boundaries ===
State Constituency	Area
State Constituency	1959
Endau	Air Papan; Endau; Kahang; Mersing; Tenglu
Mersing	FELDA Nitar; Jemaluang; Kampung Padang; Kampung Sayang; Kampung Tersusun Mawai Baru

== Election results ==
Malaysian general by-election, 8 September 1973 Upon the death of incumbent, Ismail Abdul Rahman
Party	Candidate	Votes	%	∆%
On the nomination day, Abdul Rahman Sabri won uncontested.
Alliance	Abdul Rahman Sabri			
Total valid votes			100.00	
Total rejected ballots				
Unreturned ballots				
Turnout				
Registered electors				
Majority				
Alliance hold		Swing		

Malaysian general election, 1969
Party	Candidate	Votes	%	∆%
Alliance	Ismail Abdul Rahman	9,689	80.02	▼11.89
PMIP	Hussin Mohamed Salleh	2,419	19.98	▲11.89
Total valid votes		12,108	100.00	
Total rejected ballots		834		
Unreturned ballots		0		
Turnout		12,942	70.71	▼9.60
Registered electors		18,302		
Majority		7,270	60.04	▼23.78
Alliance hold		Swing		

Malaysian general election, 1964
Party	Candidate	Votes	%	∆%
Alliance	Ismail Abdul Rahman	10,331	91.91	▲12.65
PMIP	Che Khadijah Mohd Sidik	909	8.09	▲8.09
Total valid votes		11,240	100.00	
Total rejected ballots		756		
Unreturned ballots		0		
Turnout		11,996	80.31	▲5.56
Registered electors		14,938		
Majority		9,422	83.82	▲25.30
Alliance hold		Swing		

Malayan general election, 1959
Party	Candidate	Votes	%	∆%
Alliance	Ismail Abdul Rahman	7,087	79.26	▼15.45
Independent	Ismail Mohd Arif	1,854	20.74	▲20.74
Total valid votes		8,941	100.00	
Total rejected ballots		175		
Unreturned ballots		0		
Turnout		9,116	74.75	▼8.05
Registered electors		12,196		
Majority		5,233	58.52	▼33.12
Alliance hold		Swing		

Malayan general election, 1955
Party	Candidate	Votes	%
Alliance	Ismail Abdul Rahman	10,800	94.71
National Party	Ja'afar Ali	350	3.07
Independent	Abdullah Taib	253	2.22
Total valid votes		11,403	100.00
Total rejected ballots			
Unreturned ballots			
Turnout		11,403	82.80
Registered electors		13,772	
Majority		10,450	91.64
This was a new constituency created.
Source(s): The Straits Times.
