= National Mosque of Malaysia =

Mosque in Kuala Lumpur

- Masjid Negara Malaysia مسجد نݢارا مليسيا
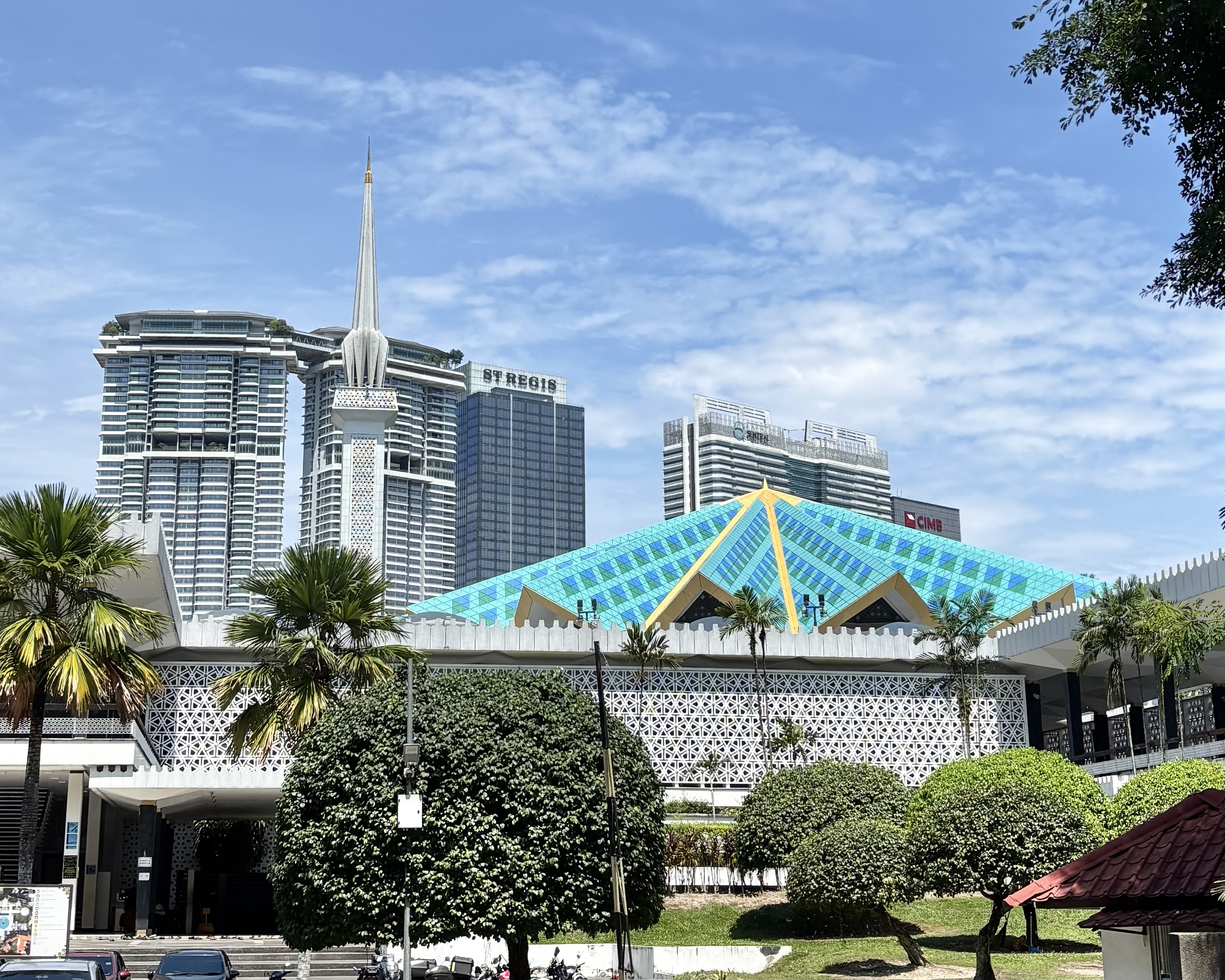

Religion
- Affiliation: Islam

Location
- Location: Jalan Perdana (formerly Jalan Venning), Kuala Lumpur, Malaysia
- Interactive map of National Mosque of Malaysia
- Coordinates: 3°8′31″N 101°41′30″E

Architecture
- Architects: Baharuddin Abu Kassim (Lead); Ikmal Hisham Albakri; Howard Ashley
- Funded by: Federal Government; State Governments; Public donations
- General contractor: Messrs Lim Chong Sharikat Pembinaan Berhad
- Groundbreaking: 27 February 1963
- Completed: 27 August 1965
- Construction cost: RM10,000,000

Specifications
- Capacity: 15,000
- Minaret height: 73 m (240 ft)

Website
- www.masjidnegara.gov.my

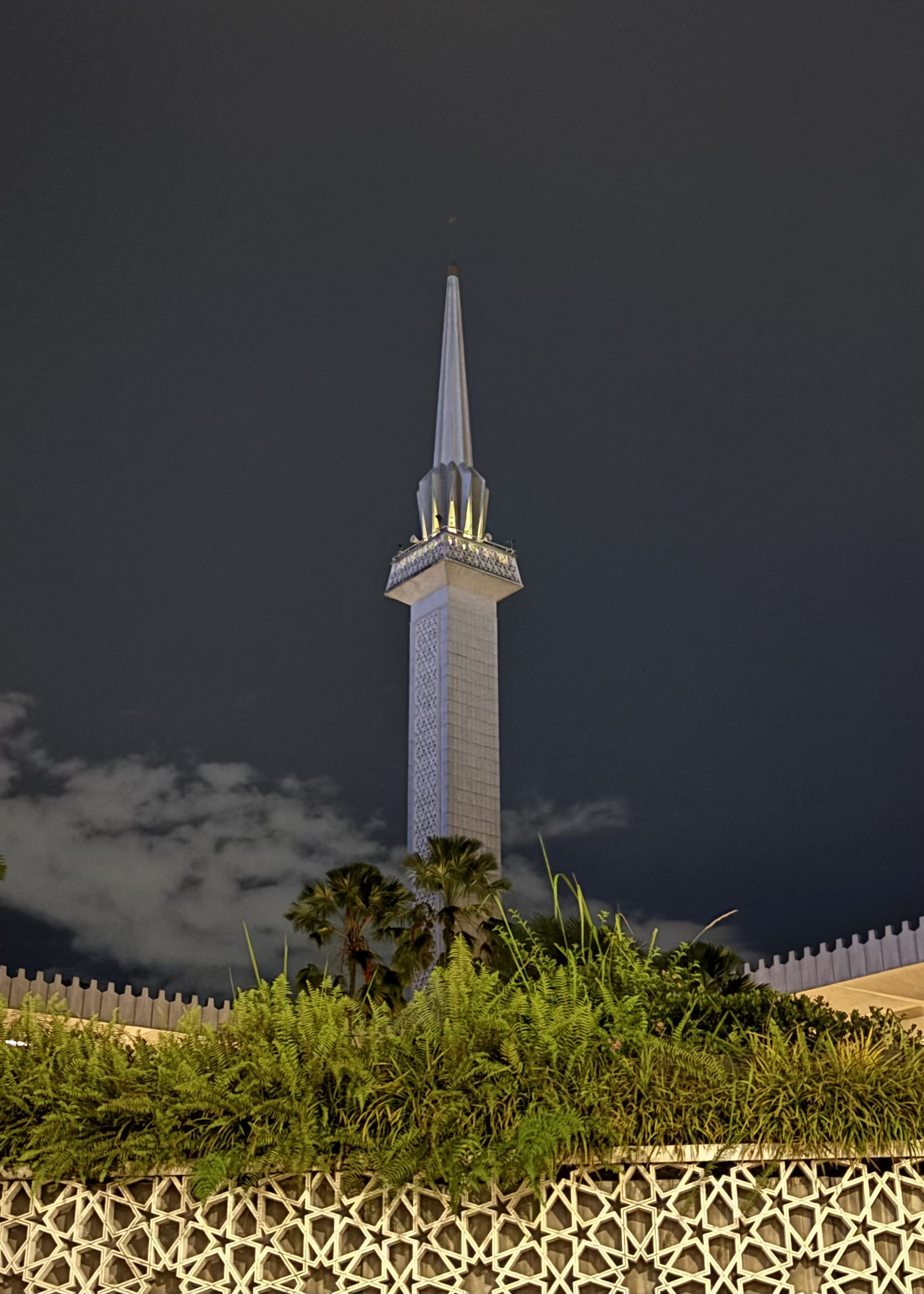
Minaret of the National Mosque

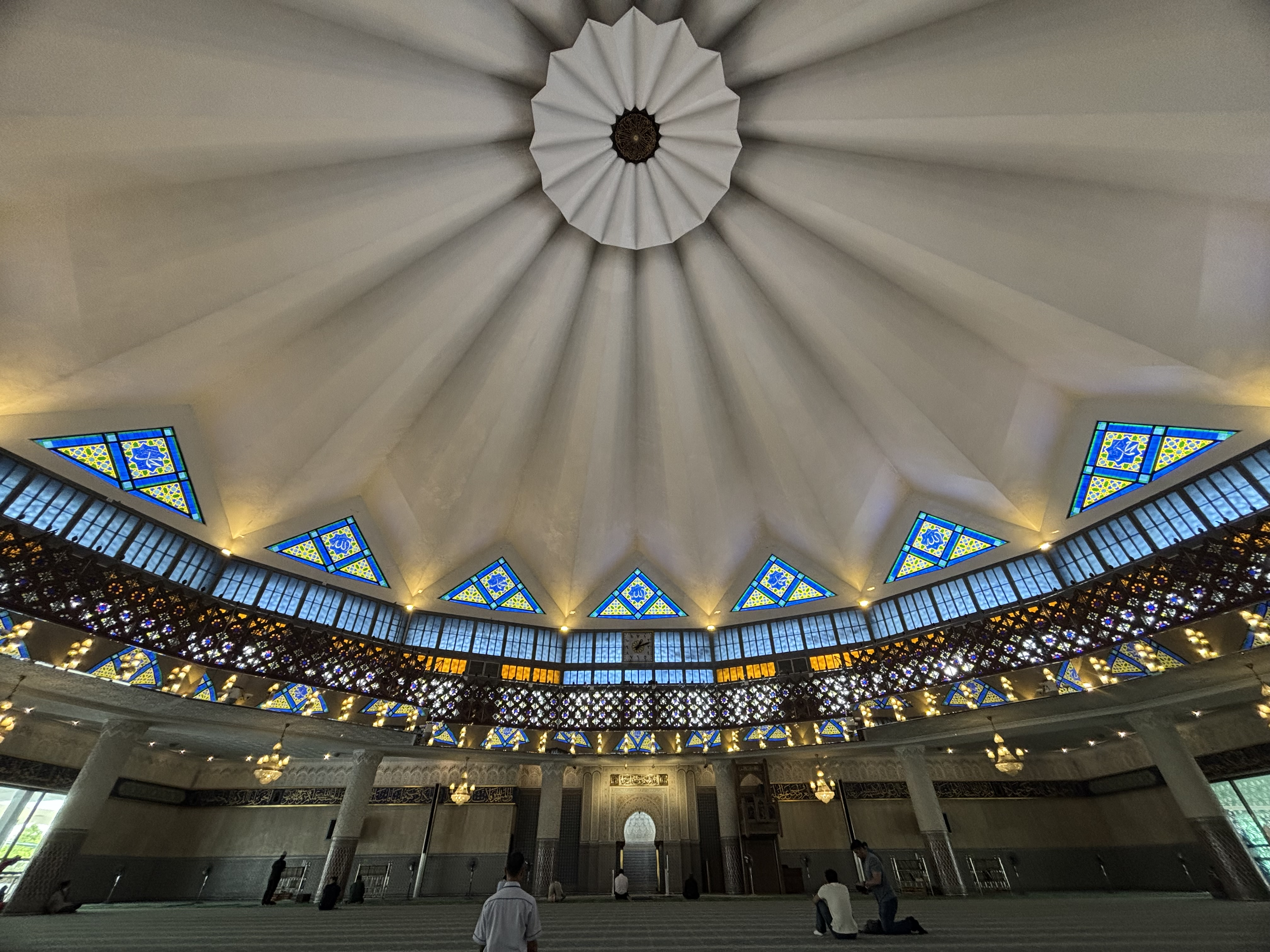
An inside view of the National Mosque of Malaysia

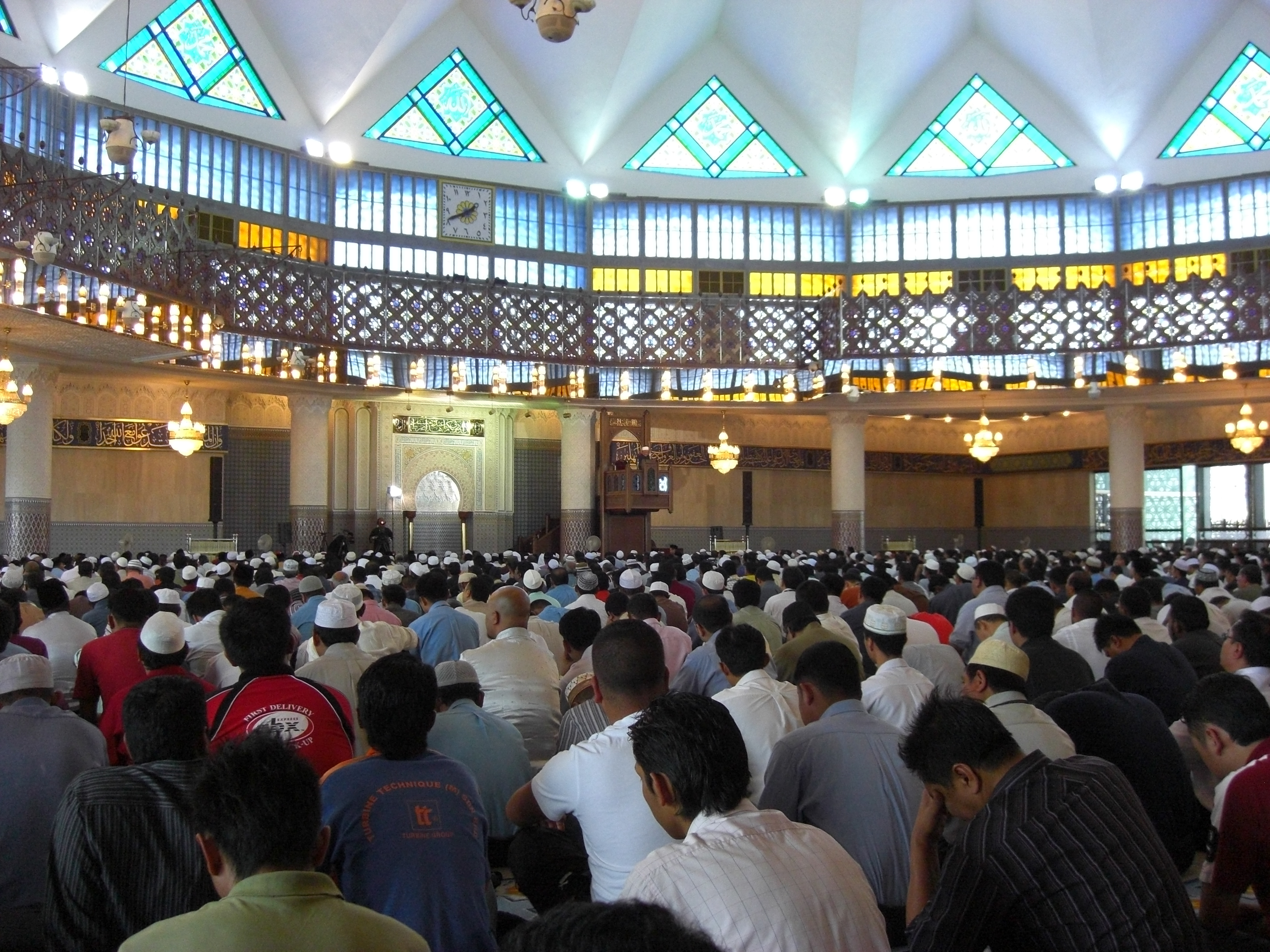
Friday prayer inside main prayer hall

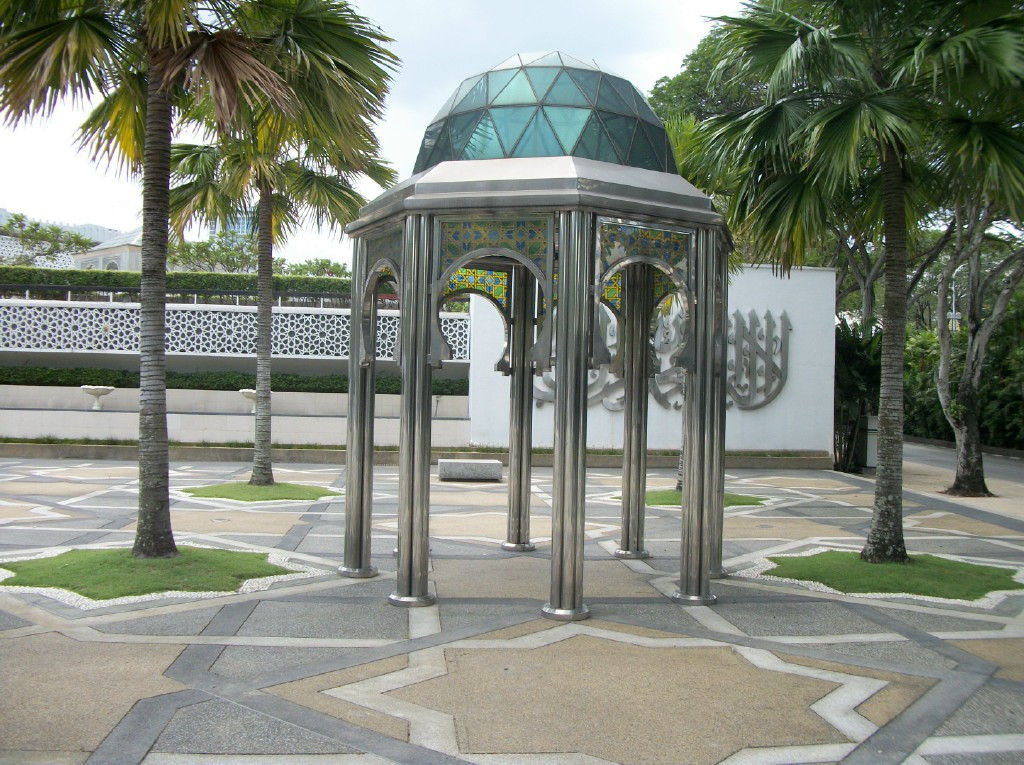
A structure part of the mosque

The National Mosque of Malaysia (Malay: Masjid Negara Malaysia; Jawi: مسجد نݢارا مليسيا) is a mosque in Kuala Lumpur, Malaysia. It has a capacity for 15,000 people and is situated among 13 acres (53,000 m^{2}) of gardens. Its key features are a 73-metre-high (240 ft) minaret and a 16-pointed star concrete main roof. The umbrella, synonymous with the tropics, is featured conspicuously – the main roof is reminiscent of an open umbrella, the minaret's cap a folded one. The folded plates of the concrete main roof are a creative solution to achieving the larger spans required in the main gathering hall. Reflecting pools and fountains are spread throughout the compound. Completed in 1965, the mosque is a bold and modern approach in reinforced concrete, symbolic of the aspirations of a then newly independent nation.

== History ==
Malaya gained its independence from the British government on 31 August 1957. Major development programs in areas of economy, social, and architecture were actively implemented in line with the new government. The programs were also implemented to portray new progressive culture and achieved democracy. Therefore, on 30 July 1957, in a meeting of the Federal Executive Council, an idea to build a national mosque as a symbol of the country's independence was mooted. In another meeting on 5 March 1958 of Chief Ministers of the eleven states in the Federation of Malaya, a proposal was made to name the mosque as Masjid Tunku Abdul Rahman Putra Al-Haj, in recognition of Prime Minister Tunku Abdul Rahman's efforts in guiding the country to gaining independence. However, Tunku refused this honour; on the contrary, he named it Masjid Negara in thanksgiving for the country's peaceful independence without bloodshed.

The mosque was built on the former site of two government quarters, the Railway Services Commission building, a Masonic lodge, the NAAFI Galloway Club and the Venning Road Brethren Gospel Hall, which were acquired by the government in 1961. The church was offered land on Jalan Imbi as a replacement and is now known as Jalan Imbi Chapel. The original structure of the mosque was designed by a three-person team from the Public Works Department led by Baharuddin Abu Kassim, along with Ikmal Hisham Albakri and Howard Ashley. The engineer in charge of the construction of the mosque, which commenced in 1963, was Antony Morris.

The first foundation stone of the mosque was laid on 27 February 1963. Two years later on 27 August 1965, the mosque was declared open by the third Yang di-Pertuan Agong, the late Tuanku Syed Putra of Perlis. The construction of the mosque cost RM10 million.

The mosque underwent major renovations in 1987, and the once-pink concrete roof is now clad in green and blue tiles. Today, Masjid Negara continues to stand sleek and stylish against the Kuala Lumpur skyline. An underground passage leads to the National Mosque located near the Kuala Lumpur railway station, along Jalan Sultan Hishamuddin. Its unique modern design embodies a contemporary expression of traditional Islamic art calligraphy and ornamentation. Near the mosque is the Makam Pahlawan (Heroes' Mausoleum), a burial ground of several Malaysian Muslim leaders. Makam Pahlawan is a 7-pointed star concrete roofed structure.

The mosque was the largest in Malaysia until the completion in 1988 of the Sultan Salahuddin Abdul Aziz Mosque in Shah Alam.

On 6 July 2007, the mosque together with the mausoleum were declared as a heritage site under the National Heritage Act 2005, which were later gazetted as such in November 2009 and later elevated to the status of "national heritage" in November 2012. On 27 August 2015, Masjid Negara celebrated its Golden Jubilee (50th anniversary).

== Imams of the National Mosque ==
1. Ghazali Abdullah (1965)
2. Mohs Salleh Hassan Farid
3. Sheikh Abdul Mohsein bin Salleh (1974–1975)
4. Ahmad Shahir bin Daud (1975–1980)
5. Abu Hassan bin Din Al-Hafiz (1981–1983)
6. Ahmad Shahir bin Daud (1984–1992)
7. Arifin Harun (1992–1993)
8. Taib Azamudden bin Md. Taib (1993–1999)
9. A. Jalil bin Sindring @ Prangerang (1999–September 2001)
10. Wan Halim bin Wan Harun (2001–2004)
11. Kamaruddin bin Zakaria (2005–2006)
12. Tan Sri Dato' Sri Haji Ismail bin Haji Muhammad (February 2007 – 2019)
13. Haji Ehsan bin Mohd Hosni (February 2020–2026)
14. DR Amru AlHaz bin Adnan (April 2026 - Present)

== Transportation ==
The mosque is within walking distance of the Kuala Lumpur railway station, which is served by KTM ETS and two KTM Komuter lines, namely the Batu Caves-Pulau Sebang line and the Tanjung Malim-Port Klang line. The Kuala Lumpur station is also linked to the Pasar Seni station, which is served by the LRT Kelana Jaya and MRT Kajang lines.

The free Go KL City Bus (Red Line) has a stop at Masjid Negara.

== See also ==
- Timeline of Islamic history
- Islamic architecture
- Islamic art
- List of mosques
- Islam in Malaysia
- Istiqlal Mosque, Jakarta — The national mosque of Indonesia
