= Kota Kinabalu West Coast Parkway =

Road in Malaysia

- Lebuhraya Pantai Barat Kota Kinabalu

Major junctions
- Northeast end: Kota Kinabalu city centre
- FT 1 AH150 Pan Borneo Highway
- Southwest end: Tanjung Aru

Location
- Country: Malaysia
- Primary destinations: Karamunsing; Sembulan

Highway system
- Highways in Malaysia; Expressways; Federal; State

Kota Kinabalu West Coast Parkway or Lebuhraya Pantai Barat Kota Kinabalu is a major highway in Kota Kinabalu city, Sabah, Malaysia. The highway was built at the reclamation land in the year 1990s and it was part of the Kota Kinabalu coastal development project such as Sutera Harbour and KK Waterfront.

== List of interchanges ==
Km	Exit	Interchange	To	Remarks
		Kota Kinabalu city centre	North; Jalan Tun Razak; Kota Kinabalu Port Northwest; Jalan Dua Puluh; Filipino Market; The Waterfront East; Jalan Kampung Air 3	Junctions
Kota Kinabalu West Coast Parkway; Start/End of highway
		Jalan Kemajuan Junctions	West jalan centre point Centre Point East; Jalan Kemajuan; Tuaran; Inanam; Istana	T-junctions
		Sungai Sembulan bridge		
		Sutera Harbour Junctions	Northwest; Jalan Utama Sutera Harbour; Sutera Harbour; Sutera Harbour Resort; Sutera Harbour Marina; Sutera Harbour Golf and Marina Southeast; Jalan Sembulan; Sembulan; Sabah State Mosque; Sabah State Museum; Queen Elizabeth Hospital	T-junctions
Kota Kinabalu West Coast Parkway; Start/End of highway
		Tanjung Aru; Coastal Junctions	Kota Kinabalu Bypass; Southwest; Jalan Mat Salleh; Tanjung Aru; Kota Kinabalu International Airport (KKIA) (Terminal 2 = Low Cost Carrier Terminal) Northeast; FT 1 AH150 Jalan Tunku Abdul Rahman; Tuaran; Inanam; Sabah State Mosque; Sabah State Museum; Queen Elizabeth Hospital South; FT 1 AH150 Jalan Kepayan; Papar; Kinarut; Kota Kinabalu International Airport (KKIA) (Terminal 1)	Junctions
