= Kota Kinabalu Bypass =

Road in Malaysia

Kota Kinabalu Bypass
- Jalan Mat Salleh; Jalan Tunku Abdul Rahman; Jalan KK Bypass

Route information
- Part of AH150
- Maintained by Malaysian Public Works Department

Major junctions
- Northeast end: Kota Kinabalu Port
- FT 1 AH150 Pan Borneo Highway
- Southwest end: Tanjung Aru

Location
- Country: Malaysia

Highway system
- Highways in Malaysia; Expressways; Federal; State

Kota Kinabalu Bypass, comprising Jalan Mat Salleh, Jalan Tunku Abdul Rahman and Jalan KK Bypass, is a major highway in Kota Kinabalu city, Sabah, Malaysia. The highway was built at the original site of the railway line linking Tanjung Aru railway station until Kota Kinabalu Port.

== List of interchanges ==
| Km | Exit | Interchange | To | Remarks |
|---|---|---|---|---|
| | | Tanjung Aru; Aru Roundabout | | Roundabout |
Kota Kinabalu Bypass; Jalan Mat Salleh; Start/End of highway
| | | KKIA Terminal 2-LCCT Junctions | South; Jalan Lapangan Terbang Lama; Kota Kinabalu International Airport (KKIA) (Terminal 2 - low-cost carrier terminal); Arrival/Departure | T-junctions |
| | | Tanjung Aru Roundabout | North; Jalan Tanjung Aru; Kampung Air Tanjung Aru South; Lorong Kurau; Sekolah Kebangsaan Tanjung Aru 2 | Roundabout |
| | | Royal Sabah Turf Club | | |
| | | West Coast Parkway Junctions | North; Kota Kinabalu West Coast Parkway; City centre Api-Api; Sutera Harbour South; FT 1 AH150 Jalan Kepayan; Papar; Kinarut; Kota Kinabalu International Airport (KKIA) (Terminal 1) | Junctions |
Kota Kinabalu Bypass; Jalan Mat Salleh
| | | Sembulan Roundabout | North; Jalan Sembulan; Sembulan; Sutera Harbour South; FT 500 Prnampang Bypass; Penampang; Donggongon; Tambunan; Keningau | Roundabout |
Kota Kinabalu Bypass; Jalan Tunku Abdul Rahman
| | | Sabah State Mosque | | |
| | | Jalan Penampang Junctions | East; FT 501 Jalan Penampang; Penampang; Donggongon; Lok Kawi | T-junctions |
| | | Sungai Sembulan bridge | | |
| | | Karamunsing Interchange | Northwest; Jalan Kemajuan; Api-Api; KK Waterfront Southeast; Jalan Tuaran; Likas; Tuaran | Diamond interchange |
| | | Sungai Karamunsing bridge | | |
| | | Jalan Nenas Junctions | East; Jalan Nenas; Istana Negeri | T-junctions |
Kota Kinabalu Bypass; Jalan Tunku Abdul Rahman
| | | Bulatan Bandaraya Roundabout | West; Jalan Laiman Diki; City centre | Roundabout |
Kota Kinabalu Bypass; Jalan KK Bypass
| | | Jalan Istana Junctions | East; Jalan Istana; Istana Negeri | Junctions |
| | | Segama Roundabout | West; Jalan Segama 2 City centre | Roundabout |
Kota Kinabalu Bypass; Jalan KK Bypass
| | | Kota Kinabalu Port Roundabout | West; Jalan Haji Saman; Kota Kinabalu Port; City centre | Roundabout |
Jalan Tun Fuad Stephens
| | | | North; Jalan Tun Fuad Stephens; Likas; Inanam; Sepanggar; Tuaran | |
