= Fuad Stephens =

Governor and Chief Minister of Sabah

Allahyarham Huguan Siou Tun Datuk Seri Panglima Fuad Stephens SMN SPDK PNBS PSM
- محمد فؤاد ستيفن‌س
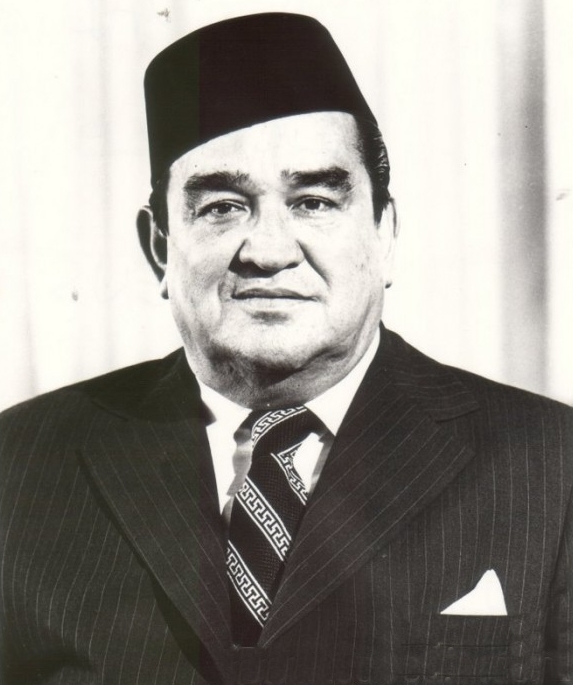

1st & 5th Chief Minister of Sabah
- In office 18 April 1976 – 6 June 1976
- Governor: Mohd Hamdan Abdullah
- Deputy: Harris Salleh
- Preceded by: Mohammad Said Keruak
- Succeeded by: Harris Salleh
- In office 16 September 1963 – 31 December 1964
- Governor: Mustapha Harun
- Deputy: Samson Sundang Gunsanad
- Preceded by: Office established
- Succeeded by: Peter Lo Sui Yin

3rd Yang di-Pertua Negara of Sabah
- In office 16 September 1973 – 28 July 1975
- Chief Minister: Mustapha Harun
- Preceded by: Pengiran Ahmad Raffae
- Succeeded by: Mohd Hamdan Abdullah

6th Malaysian High Commissioner to Australia
- In office 1968–1973
- Preceded by: Mohamed Baba
- Succeeded by: Awang Hassan

Huguan Siou (Paramount Leader) of the Kadazandusun
- In office 1960–1973
- Succeeded by: Joseph Pairin Kitingan

Personal details
- Born: Donald Aloysius Marmaduke Stephens; 14 September 1920 Kudat, British North Borneo (now Sabah, Malaysia)
- Died: 6 June 1976 (aged 55) Kota Kinabalu, Sabah, Malaysia
- Resting place: Makam Pahlawan, Masjid Negeri Sabah, Kota Kinabalu
- Party: United National Kadazan Organisation (UNKO); United Pasokmomogun Kadazan Organisation (UPKO); Sabah People's United Front (BERJAYA)
- Spouse(s): Ida (married 1950–1957); Rahimah Stephens (Cecilia June Lutter)
- Children: Johari (John Benedict; adopted–1952–1976); Affendi (Richard Bernard; 1958–2009); Asgari (James Denis; born 1960); Faridah (Jean Heather; born 1962); Fauziah (Elma; adopted–born 1958)
- Parents: Jules Pavitt Stephens, Snr. (1896–1944) (father); Edith Margaret Laura Mary Cope (1898–1976) (mother)

Muhammad Fuad Stephens (né Donald Aloysius Marmaduke Stephens, born 14 September 1920 – 6 June 1976) was a Malaysian politician who served as the 1st and 5th Chief Minister of Sabah from September 1963 to December 1964 and again briefly from April 1976 to his death in June 1976, 3rd Yang di-Pertua Negara of Sabah from September 1973 to July 1975, and 6th High Commissioner of Malaysia to Australia from 1968 to 1973. In addition, he also served as the 1st Huguan Siou or Paramount Leader of the Kadazandusun community. He played a role in bringing Sabah into the Federation of Malaysia in 1963. While he was initially against the idea of Sabah joining in the Federation, given British concerns about the stability of the region and their move to relinquish all their colonies in the post WWII era, he was gradually convinced to work towards it. He held the chief minister's post from 16 September 1963 until 31 December 1964 when he was forced to resign; and again in 1976 for 54 days from 15 April.

During his second term as Chief Minister, he died in a controversial accident on 6 June 1976 dubbed the Double Six Crash, in Kota Kinabalu, the state capital of Sabah. He was a passenger in an Australian made Nomad aircraft which crashed and killed everyone on board, including his son Johari. His body was buried at the State Mausoleum near the Sabah State Mosque, Kota Kinabalu.

== Early life ==
Stephens was born on 14 September 1920 in Kudat. His father, Jules Stephen Pavitt (later known as Jules Pavitt Stephens, Snr.), was of mixed parentage, half-Kadazan and half-British. Jules was born and brought up in North Borneo in the district of Papar. Jules' father, Ernest Alfred Pavitt was born in Akaroa, New Zealand but had ancestral roots in Colchester, Essex, England, United Kingdom. When Ernest Alfred Pavitt left North Borneo to live in New Zealand, Jules dropped the name Pavitt and made his surname Stephens. Fuad Stephens' mother, Edith Cope, was of mixed Japanese, British and Dusun ancestry from Kinabatangan, Sandakan. Stephens had five siblings; two younger sisters and three younger brothers. Two of them, John and Martin, died in infancy. A third, Leo Benedict was born in 1926 and later became the President of the Dewan Negara from 1985 to 1988 amongst other accomplishments. His sisters were Esther (born in 1928) and Agnes (born in 1930).

== Formation of Malaysia and the first Chief Minister of Sabah ==
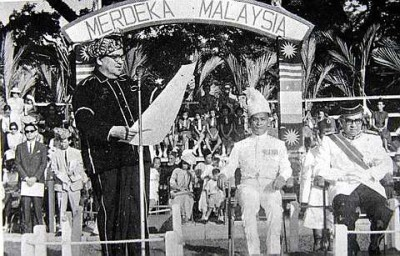
Fuad Stephens declaring the formation of Malaysia on 16 September 1963

Donald Stephens founded the political party United National Kadazan Organisation (UNKO) in August 1961. He played a key role in negotiating the independence of Sabah and the formation of Malaysia, together with Tun Mustapha of United Sabah National Organisation (USNO), Lee Kuan Yew of Singapore and Tunku Abdul Rahman, the then Prime Minister of Malaya. The formation of Malaysia was finally achieved on 16 September 1963, which is today known as Malaysia Day.

Stephens saw Malaysia as the federation of four countries - Malaya, Sabah, Sarawak and Singapore - as equal partners, as opposed to the eleven states making up the Federation of Malaya, which had less autonomy. In 1960, Stephens thought that Sabah should adopt English as the official language because "Malay not yet practical enough a language to act as the thread to knit all races together in this country, although it is, and will remain a very important language" and English is "termed a "neutral" language, it need not cause jealousy on the part of any race". He tried to promote the concept of a united Kadazan-Dusun identity, although this was unsuccessful.

He became Sabah's first Chief Minister as UNKO together with USNO and Sabah Chinese Association (SCA) formed the Sabah Alliance coalition to rule the new Government of Sabah.

During the first year of Donald Stephens ' chief ministership, his relationship with the federal government was cordial because the state government received funding from the federal government while maintaining a certain form of autonomy. The relationship soon turned sour when Stephens started to question the federal government on Sabah rights as listed in the 20-point agreement, Inter-government committee (IGC) report, and Malaysia Agreement. Donald Stephens preferred Borneotisation of the state civil service in Sabah at a pace that local candidates could be trained to take the place of British expatriates. On the other hand, the federal government was keen to replace the British expatriates in Sabah with those from Peninsular Malaysia in order to promote national unity.

== Federal cabinet minister ==
In 1964, Donald Stephens stepped down as Chief Minister to become the first Malaysian federal cabinet member from Sabah. He was replaced by Peter Lo Sui Yin of SCA. Stephens became the minister in charge of Sabah affairs under the Prime Minister's department.

Following Singapore's exit from Malaysia in 1965, Stephens sought a review of Sabah's participation in the federation, although he was not seeking secession. However, this was rejected by the federal government, which feared that such a move would endanger the federation as a whole.

From 1968 to 1973, he held the post of Malaysian High Commissioner to Australia.

== Governor of Sabah ==
In 1973, Fuad Stephens was appointed as the governor of Sabah, known as the Yang di-Pertua Negara (the post was later downgraded after 1976 to Yang di-Pertua Negeri). He held this position until 1975.

== Second tenure as chief minister and plane crash ==
After Tun Fuad resigned from the post of governor in 1975, he together with Harris Salleh formed the new political party Sabah People's United Front (BERJAYA). They won the 1976 state election, defeating Tun Mustapha's USNO and becoming the new government of Sabah. Tun Fuad Stephens became Sabah's fifth Chief Minister.

Forty-five days later, on 6 June 1976 ("Double Six"), Tun Fuad Stephens and several cabinet members boarded a flight from Labuan heading towards Kota Kinabalu. About 2 kilometres (1.2 mi) from Kota Kinabalu International Airport, the plane crashed killing everyone on board.

The site of the plane crash is marked by a memorial called Double Six Monument constructed not long after the accident. The site is located in the Sembulan area near the Grace Garden housing complex in Kota Kinabalu across Jalan Coastal Highway from Sutera Harbour resort.

== Personal life ==
Stephens converted to Islam on 7 January 1971, together with his wife and five children at Tun Mustapha's residence. Stephens said that he and Mustapha were "blood brothers" when they pricked their fingers in August 1969. He and his family also had close ties with Mustapha's family. Stephens also considered the religion to be a unifying factor in Sabah and also in Malaysia as a whole to bring prosperity and happiness to the country. Stephens adopted the name 'Muhammad Fuad', the latter meaning "heart" in Arabic. Stephens was also encouraged to abandon his surname at the time of his conversion but declined to do so.

On 14 March 2022, his widow Toh Puan Rahimah Stephens died of a heart attack at a private hospital where she was admitted after a fall at her house at the age of 92. Rahimah was also State Minister of Welfare of Sabah and Member of the Sabah State Legislative Assembly (MLA) for Kiulu. She was the first woman to be appointed to the state ministerial position. Chief Minister of Sabah Hajiji Noor also visited her family to pay his last respects and convey his condolences, he was accompanied by state government officials and state assemblymen. She was later laid to rest at the Kampung Likas Muslim Cemetery. The funeral was held in the presence of close family members.

== Honours ==
=== Honours of Malaysia ===
- Malaysia
  - Commander of the Order of Loyalty to the Crown of Malaysia (PSM) – Tan Sri (1970)
  - Grand Commander of the Order of the Defender of the Realm (SMN) – Tun (1975)
- Sabah
  - Grand Commander of the Order of Kinabalu (SPDK) – Datuk Seri Panglima (1963)
- Sarawak
  - Knight Commander of the Most Exalted Order of the Star of Sarawak (PNBS) – Dato (1964)

=== Awards ===
- Tun Fuad Stephens was posthumously granted the soubriquet Bapa Malaysia Dari Sabah (Father of Malaysia From Sabah) and Huguan Siou.

=== Places named after him ===
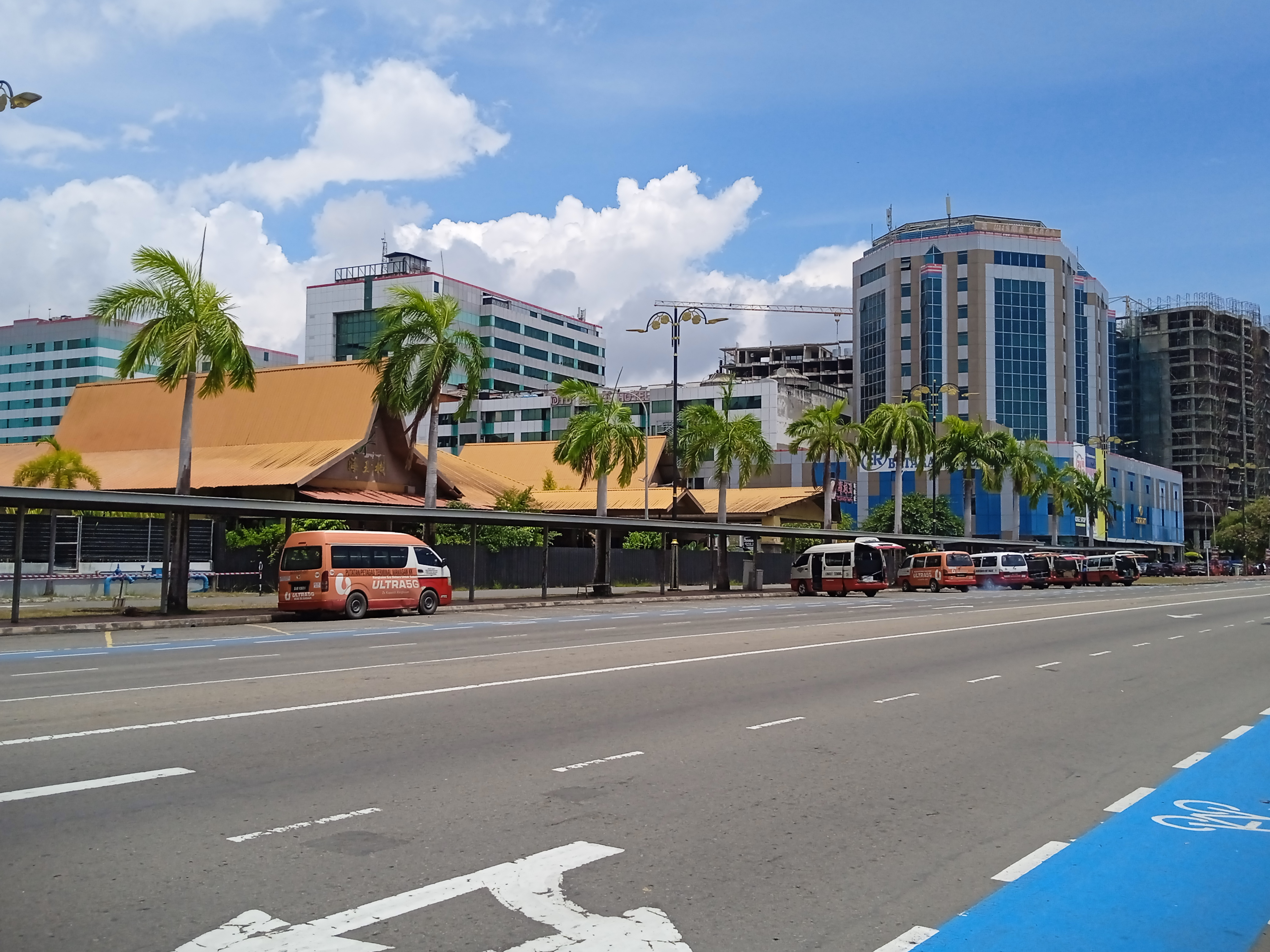
Jalan Tun Fuad Stephens in Kota Kinabalu, Sabah

Several places were named after him, including:

- Tun Fuad Stephens Park, a public park in Kota Kinabalu.
- SMK Tun Fuad Stephens, a secondary school at Kiulu, Tamparuli, Tuaran.
- SMK Taman Tun Fuad, a secondary school at Kota Kinabalu.
- Jalan Tun Fuad Stephens, a major highway in the Kota Kinabalu metropolitan area.
- Jalan Tun Mohd Fuad, a road at Taman Tun Dr Ismail, Kuala Lumpur.
- SK Tun Fuad, a primary school at Kunak, Tawau Division.
- Dewan Tun Fuad Stephens, the main community hall of the Penampang district located in Donggongon, Penampang.
- Maktab Rendah Sains Mara Tun Muhammad Fuad Stephens, a government-owned elite boarding school in Sandakan.
- Wisma Tun Fuad Stephens, a state government building complex in Kota Kinabalu.
- Kolej Kediaman Tun Fuad Stephens, one of the student residential areas in University Malaysia Sabah.

Political offices
New creation	Chief Minister of Sabah; 1963–1964	Succeeded by Peter Lo Sui Yin
Preceded by Pengiran Ahmad Raffae Pengiran Omar	Yang di-Pertua Negeri of Sabah; 1973–1975	Succeeded by Mohd Hamdan Abdullah
Preceded by Mohammad Said Keruak	Chief Minister of Sabah; April 1976 – June 1976	Succeeded by Harris Salleh
