= Pengiran Ahmad Raffae =

Allahyarham Tun Datuk Seri Panglima Pengiran Ahmad Raffae Pengiran Omar SMN SPDK
- أحمد رفعي عمر
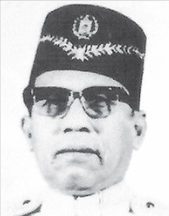

2nd Yang di-Pertua Negeri of Sabah
- In office 16 September 1965 – 16 September 1973
- Chief Minister: Peter Lo Su Yin; Mustapha Harun
- Preceded by: Mustapha Harun
- Succeeded by: Fuad Stephens

Personal details
- Born: Pengiran Ahmad Raffae bin Pengiran Omar; 4 November 1907 Sipitang, North Borneo
- Died: 18 March 1995 (aged 87) Queen Elizabeth Hospital, Kota Kinabalu, Sabah, Malaysia
- Spouse(s): 1. Dayang Kusnah Sian; 2. Dayang Supinah Abdullah
- Children: Datuk Dayang Mahani
- Parent: Pengiran Omar (father)

Pengiran Ahmad Raffae bin Pengiran Omar (4 November 1907 – 18 March 1995) was the second Governor of the Malaysian state of Sabah.

== Personal life ==
Tun Pengiran Haji Ahmad Raffae was born on 4 November 1907 at Sipitang, then located in Beaufort, British North Borneo. His father was Orang Kaya Kaya Pengiran Haji Omar, a well known native officer who served as the first local Deputy Assistant District Officer of Putatan, Penampang from 1915 until 1922.

Tun Pengiran Haji Ahmad Raffae married Toh Puan Dayang Hajah Kusnah binti Enche Sian and they had five children. His second wife was Toh Puan Dayang Supinah binti Abdullah.

== Education ==
Tun Pengiran Haji Ahmad Raffae studied at Putatan English Special School in Putatan, Penampang and later at a Malay vernacular school in Papar district (1919-1922). He later went on to pursue his studies at another Malay vernacular school in Sipitang until 1924.

== Career ==
Upon completing his studies in 1930, Tun Pengiran Haji Ahmad Raffae joined the British North Borneo Civil Service as a Grade III Native Clerk on 1 May 1930. He was then appointed as Trainee Deputy Assistant District Officer of Beaufort in 1941 before being promoted to a permanent post in 1942.

During the Japanese Occupation, Tun Pengiran Haji Ahmad Raffae was appointed as Assistant District Officer of Beaufort. He was later appointed as Native Officer in Sipitang, Beaufort and Kota Belud. After the Japanese surrendered to the Allied Forces in 1945, Tun Pengiran Haji Ahmad Raffae served as Deputy Assistant District Officer of Tenom on 1 July 1946 before being promoted to Acting District Officer of Beaufort. He was later transferred to Mempakul in Sipitang, Kuala Penyu and Beaufort where he served as Deputy Assistant District Officer.

In 1954, Tun Pengiran Haji Ahmad Raffae was appointed as Deputy Assistant District Officer of Labuan and Penampang. He was later transferred to Beluran, one of the districts in the Sandakan Division after serving as Assistant District Officer for eight months in 1955. From 1957 until 1962, Tun Pengiran Haji Ahmad Raffae served as Assistant District Officer in Beaufort, Kuala Penyu, Ranau and Pensiangan until his retirement from Civil Service in 1962 after 32 years of service, upon turning 55 years old.

== Acting Governorship ==
From 1964 until 1965, Tun Pengiran Haji Ahmad Raffae served as Acting Yang di-Pertua Negara of Sabah under the governorship of Tun Mustapha. During his tenure as Acting Governor, Tun Pengiran Haji Ahmad Raffae plays an active role in the state development and also in maintaining peace and political stability among the different races and various ethnic groups in Sabah.

== Governorship ==
On 16 September 1965, Tun Pengiran Haji Ahmad Raffae was appointed as the second Yang di-Pertua Negara of Sabah after the resignation of Tun Mustapha. He served as Governor for two terms until 16 September 1973.

== Death ==
Tun Pengiran Haji Ahmad Raffae died due to old age at the Queen Elizabeth Hospital, Kota Kinabalu on 18 March 1995 at the age of 88. He died less than two months after his predecessor and political comrade, Tun Mustapha who died on 2 January 1995. He was buried at the Sabah State Heroes Mausoleum in the compound of Sabah State Mosque in Kota Kinabalu.

== Honours ==
=== Honours of Malaysia ===
- Malaysia
  - Grand Commander of the Order of the Defender of the Realm (SMN) – Tun (1967)

Political offices
Preceded by Mustapha Harun	Yang di-Pertua Negeri of Sabah; 1965–1973	Succeeded by Fuad Stephens
