= List of parks and gardens in Malaysia =

This is a list of parks and gardens in Malaysia.

== Lists ==
=== Kuala Lumpur ===
Most public parks in Kuala Lumpur are managed by the Landscape and Recreation Development Department, Kuala Lumpur City Hall.

- Perdana Botanical Garden
- Rimba Ilmu Botanical Gardens
- Kuala Lumpur Bird Park
- Kuala Lumpur Butterfly Park
- Kuala Lumpur Orchid Garden
- Kuala Lumpur Hibiscus Garden
- Kuala Lumpur Deer Park
- KLCC Park
- Titiwangsa Lake Gardens
- KL Forest Eco Park
- Forest Research Institute Malaysia (FRIM)
- Kepong Metropolitan Park
- Bukit Jalil Park
- Ampang Hilir Lake Garden
- Lembah Kiara Recreational Park
- Alam Damai Park
- Bukit Kiara Arboretum Park
- Taman Rimba Bukit Kiara
- Pudu Ulu Recreational Park
- Permaisuri Lake Gardens
- Datuk Keramat Lake Gardens
- Metropolitan Batu Park

=== Malacca ===
- Malacca Botanical Garden
- Garden of Thousand Flowers
- Datuk Wira Poh Ah Tiam Machap Recreational Park

=== Pahang ===
- Raub Lake Park

=== Penang ===
- City Park
- Esplanade
- Gurney Bay
- Penang Botanic Gardens
- Sia Boey Urban Archaeological Park

=== Perak ===
- Taiping Lake Gardens

=== Sabah ===
- Likas Bay Park
- Perdana Park
- Prince Philip Park
- Tun Fuad Stephens Park

=== Selangor ===
- National Botanical Garden Shah Alam (TBNSA)
- Mimaland

=== Johor ===
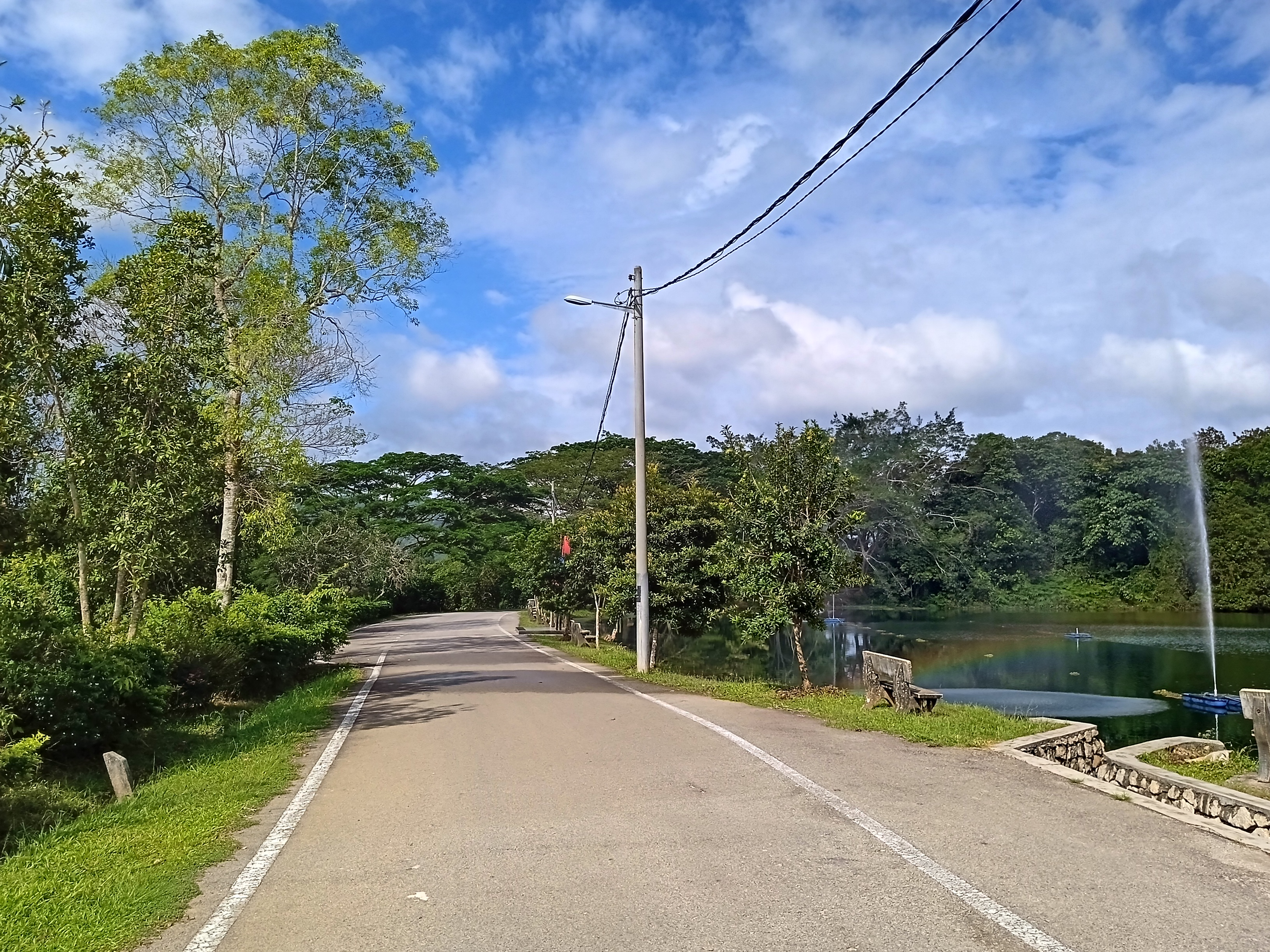
Johor Botanical Garden

- Johor Botanical Garden (Taman Botani Johor)

== See also ==
- List of national parks in Malaysia
