= Jalan Tun Fuad Stephens =

Road in Malaysia

- Kota Kinabalu Coastal Highway
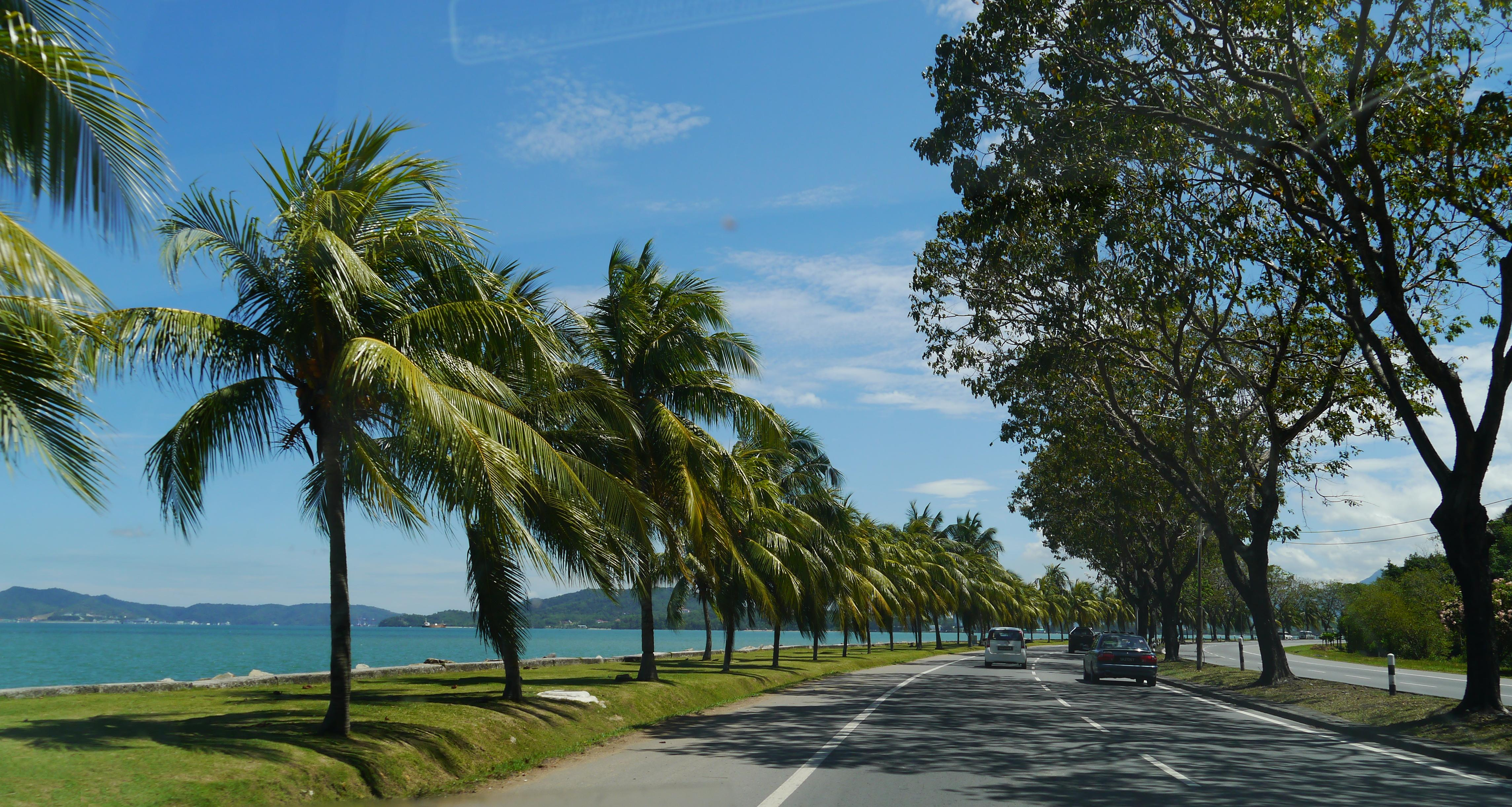

Major junctions
- Northeast end: Sepanggar
- FT 1 AH150 Pan Borneo Highway; Kota Kinabalu Bypass
- Southwest end: Kota Kinabalu city centre

Location
- Country: Malaysia
- Primary destinations: Likas; Inanam

Highway system
- Highways in Malaysia; Expressways; Federal; State

Jalan Tun Fuad Stephens or Kota Kinabalu Coastal Highway is a major highway in Kota Kinabalu city, Sabah, Malaysia. The highway was built on reclaimed land in the 1990s and it was part of the Kota Kinabalu coastal development project. It was named after Sabah's first chief minister and state Yang di-Pertua Negeri (Governor), Tun Fuad Stephens (Donald Stephens).

== List of interchanges ==
| Km | Exit | Interchange | To | Remarks |
|---|---|---|---|---|
| | | Kota Kinabalu city centre | South; Kota Kinabalu Bypass; Tanjung Aru; Kota Kinabalu International Airport (KKIA); Queen Elizabeth Hospital | |
Kota Kinabalu Bypass
| | | Kota Kinabalu Port Roundabout | West; Jalan Haji Saman; Kota Kinabalu Port; City centre | Roundabout |
Jalan Tun Fuad Stephens
| | | Likas; Bulatan Istiadat Roundabout | South; Jalan Istiadat; Likas Sports Complex; Sabah Trade Centre | Roundabout |
| | | Likas; Bulatan Pasir Roundabout | Southeast; Jalan Pasir; Inanam | Roundabout |
| | | Kota Kinabalu City Mosque | | |
| | | Sungai Inanam bridge | | |
| | | Bulatan Tun Fuad Stephens Roundabout | North; Jalan Pentadbiran; Tun Mustapha Tower (Sabah Foundation Building); Chief Minister's Department; Dewan Bahasa dan Pustaka (DBP) Sabah regional branch headquarters | Roundabout |
| | | Kingfisher Roundabout | Northwest; Jalan Dewan Undangan Negeri; Sabah State Assembly Building Southeast; Jalan Kingfisher; Jalan Bangka-Bangka; Maktab Nasional; Hospital Likas | Roundabout |
| | | Kompleks Pentadbiran Kerajaan Persekutuan Sabah (Sabah Federal Government Administrative Complex) | | |
| | | UMS Junctions | Northwest; Universiti Malaysia Sabah (UMS) | Junctions |
| | | Rampayan Junctions | East; Jalan Rampayan; Rampayan; Kampung Delima Melayu; Menggatal | T-junctions |
Jalan Tun Fuad Stephens; Start/End of highway
| | | Sepanggar; Sepanggar Junctions | North; Taman Bukit Sepanggar Jalan Sepanggar West; Kota Kinabalu Industrial Park; Karambunai; Karambunai Resort; Universiti Teknologi Mara (UiTM) Sabah Campus East; FT 1 AH150 Tuaran Bypass Road; Kota Belud; Tuaran | Junctions |
