= Tun Fuad Stephens Park =

Park in Kota Kinabalu, Sabah, Malaysia

Coordinates: 5°56′54″N 116°6′41″E

- Taman Tun Fuad Stephens
- Interactive map of Tun Fuad Stephens Park
- Location: Bukit Padang, Kota Kinabalu, Sabah, Malaysia
- Status: Open
- Parking: Available

Tun Fuad Stephens Park is a recreational park in Bukit Padang, Kota Kinabalu, Sabah, Malaysia. It is built in honour of the late Chief Minister of Sabah Fuad Stephens who perished in the Double Six Tragedy in 1976.

== Features ==
The park features a 2.1 kilometres asphalt jogging path with various trees species surrounding the park along with a man-made lake. The park also previously features a seafood restaurant, hawker centre, event halls and a water theme park (Closed).

== Renovation works ==
In 2022, the park was closed for upgrading works with financing of RM20million set by the Federal Government of Malaysia.

As of October 2025, the park has been partially opened with upcoming facilities such as the Botanical Center, Commercial Plaza, Boardwalk and Lake Walk, Conservatory Park and Bamboo Corner, and the Herb Garden delayed until further notice.

== Accessibility ==
The access to the park are free from any charges with parking spaces available.

== See also ==
- List of parks and gardens in Malaysia
