= Perdana Park =

Park in Kota Kinabalu, Sabah, Malaysia

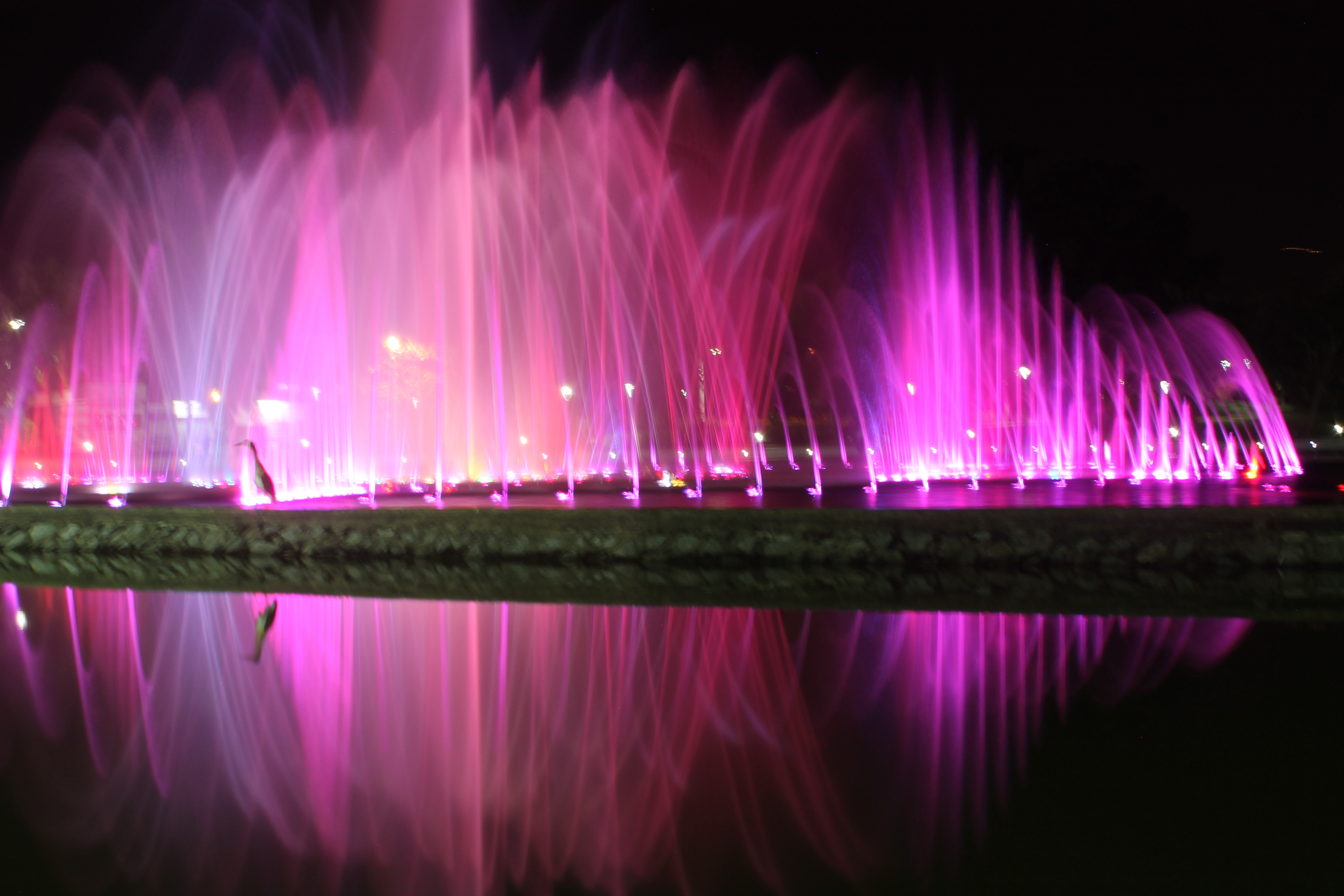
- Perdana Park musical fountain.
- Type: Public park
- Location: Kota Kinabalu, Sabah, Malaysia.
- Coordinates: 5°57′2.26″N 116°3′1.34″E

Perdana Park is a recreational park in Tanjung Aru, Kota Kinabalu, Sabah, Malaysia.

== Features ==
The park features a running track, wheelchair ramps, and reserved parking space for disabled people. At night, visitors can watch light musical fountain, with the park also become a busking venues.

== Accessibility ==
The access to the park are free from any charges.

== See also ==
- List of parks and gardens in Malaysia
