= Wisma Tun Fuad Stephens =

Government building in Kota Kinabalu, Sabah, Malaysia

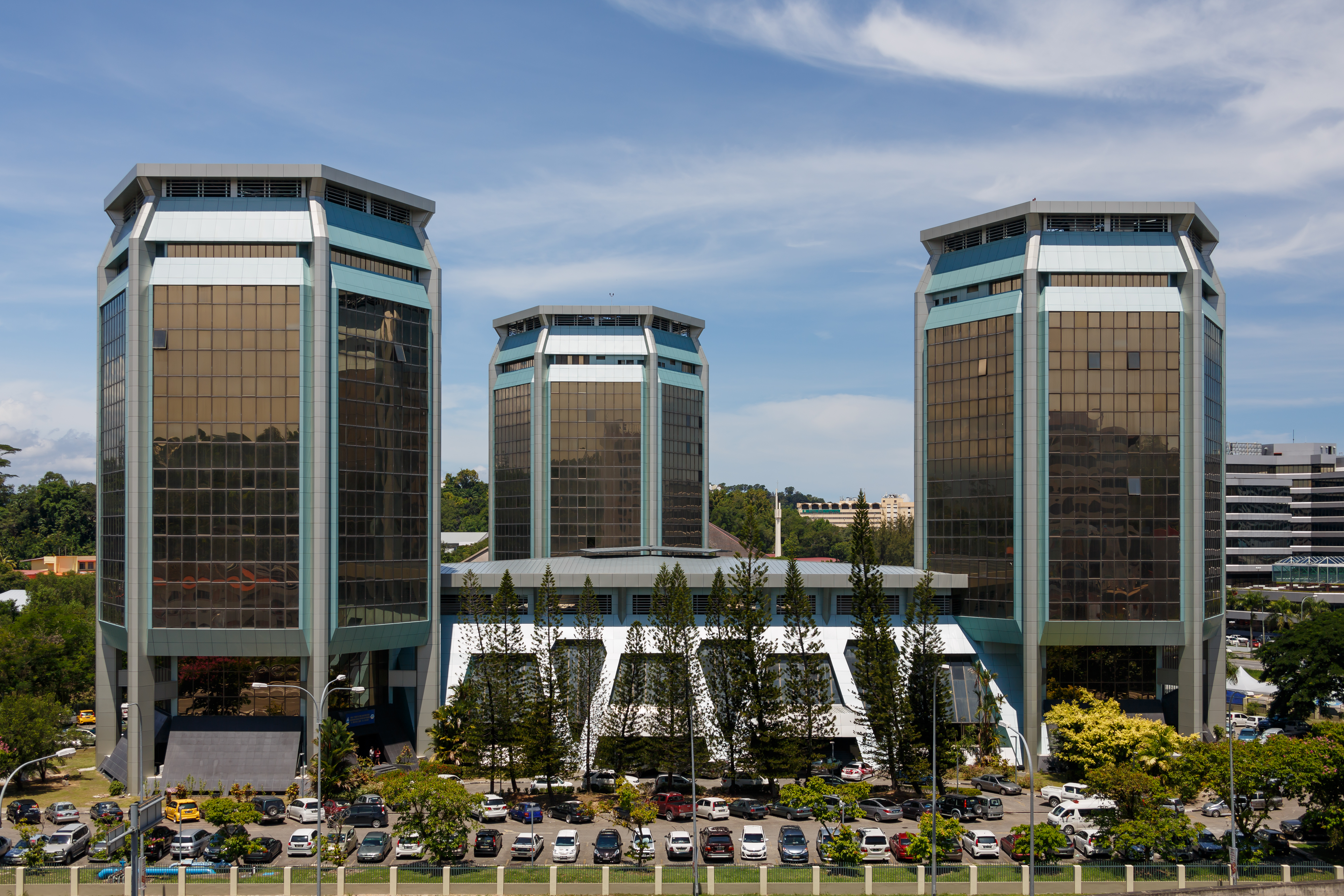
- Interactive map of the Wisma Tun Fuad Stephens area

General information
- Location: Sabah, Kota Kinabalu, Malaysia
- Coordinates: 5°58′6″N 116°4′28″E

Wisma Tun Fuad Stephens is a state government building located in the city of Kota Kinabalu, Sabah, Malaysia. It is named after the first Chief Minister of Sabah, Fuad Stephens.

== Features ==
The building is the first disabled-friendly building in the state of Sabah, providing facilities like a motorised wheelchair lift, parking lot, washroom and a special sliding door at the building entrance.
