= Tanjung Aru Eco Development =

Condominium in Kota Kinabalu, Sabah, Malaysia

General information
- Status: Unknown Status
- Location: Sabah, Tanjung Aru, Kota Kinabalu, Malaysia
- Groundbreaking: 16 September 2013
- Construction started: April 2017
- Cost: RM7.1 billion RM1.83 billion (land reclamation)
- Client: Government of Sabah
- Owner: Tanjung Aru Eco Development Sdn Bhd; Savills (development consultant)

Website
- www.benoy.com/tg-aru-ecodevelopment

The Tanjung Aru Eco Development is a mixed development project at Tanjung Aru in Kota Kinabalu, Sabah, Malaysia, with the addition of resort hotels, residential areas, marinas, entertainment venues, beach clubs and dining areas. The redevelopment areas cover some 340 hectares, which will double the Tanjung Aru park's size to about 30 hectares. Part of the area would be transformed into a rainforest, intended to rejuvenate the Prince Philip Park located nearby. The refurbishment of the park would include a promenade, walking and cycling tracks and an ecology centre, along with the construction of a 133 hectares Greg Norman-designed golf course, seven hotels with 1,800 rooms and 5,000 apartment and condominium units. The project however has been met with criticisms from local conservation groups.

== History ==
The projects ground breaking started on 16 September 2013, and the projects master plan was submitted to the Kota Kinabalu City Hall in December 2016.

Currently, the status of the Tanjung Aru Eco Development is silent & [for those who know do update it]

== Concerns ==
The projects drew concerns from local conservation groups, who labelled it as being unfriendly to the public and lacking in transparency, and launched a petition to stop the project. Due to the concerns raised, a Special Environmental Impact Assessment (SEIA) report on the projects was released in 2016 to share the feedback and recommendations from the public.

The projects was scheduled to move into the first phase in 2016, with Luyang Assemblyman Hiew King Cheu calling on the state government to start the projects without any further delays despite the concerns from conservationists. He argued that the projects would bring job and economic opportunities to the locals, and that the environmental upgrade would attract more interest for people to visit and live in the area. Kota Kinabalu City Hall Mayor Yeo Boon Hai also praised the projects, and he dismissed critics' suggestion that the project would failed due to the state government's incompetence along with claims that the projects would be disastrous to environment. The project was also supported by Chief Minister Musa Aman.
