= Sutera Harbour =

Resort in Kota Kinabalu, Sabah, Malaysia

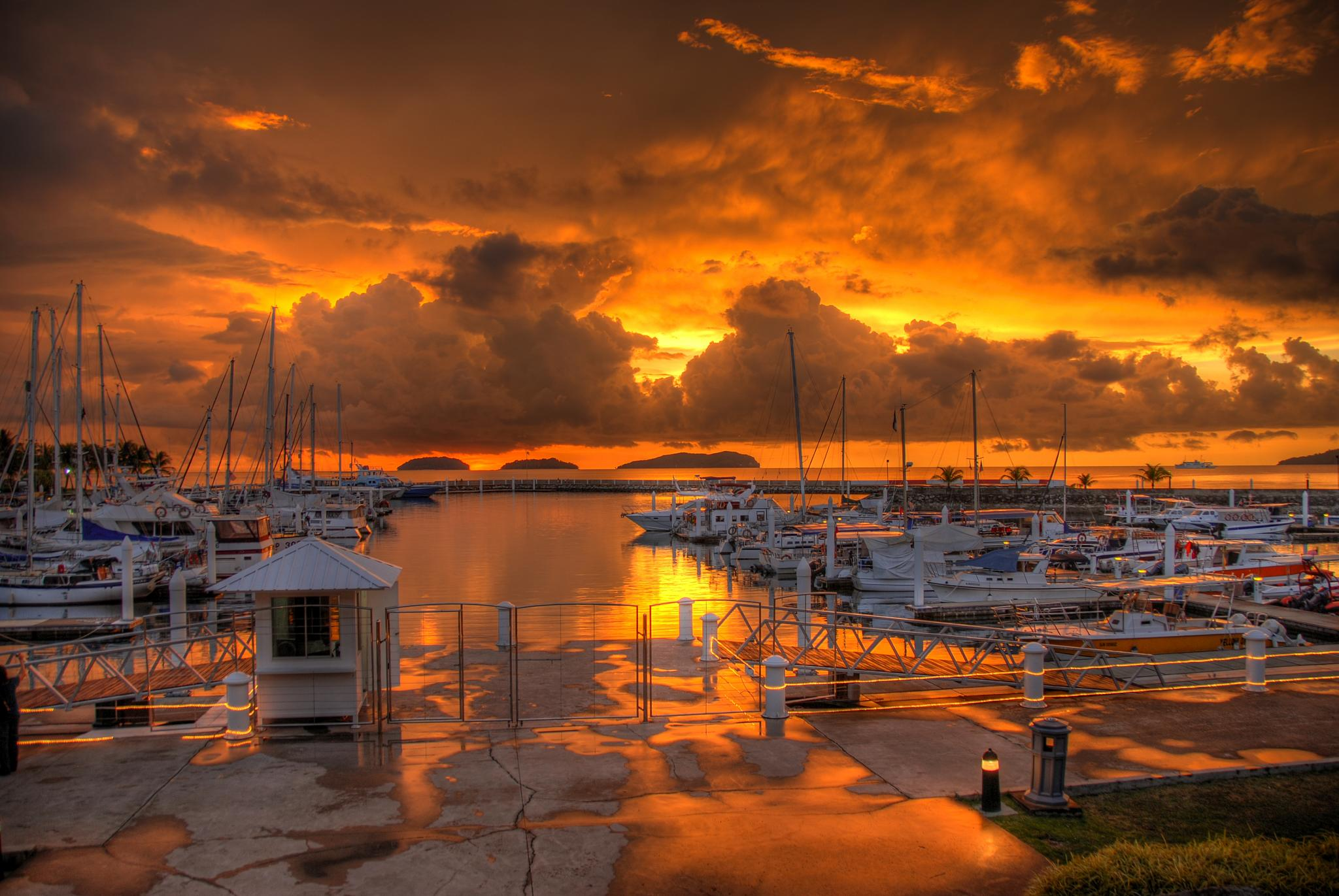
- Sutera Harbour Resort facing the South China Sea during sunset.
- Interactive map of the Sutera Harbour area

General information
- Location: Sabah, 1 Sutera Harbour Boulevard off Coastal Highway, 88100 Sembulan/Tanjung Aru, Kota Kinabalu, Malaysia
- Coordinates: 5°58′N 116°04′E

Other information
- Number of rooms: 956

Website
- www.suteraharbour.com

Sutera Harbour is a resort located in the city of Kota Kinabalu, Sabah, Malaysia. It comprises two 5-star hotels, a 27-hole golf course designed by Graham Marsh, a 104-berth marina and an exclusive golf and country club with extensive recreational facilities facing the South China Sea with a background view of the Tunku Abdul Rahman National Park. In 2014, Singapore-based GSH Corporation acquired the resort.

There are 956 rooms in total across the two 5-star hotels together, which makes it the largest ever resort in Kota Kinabalu as well as Borneo overall.
