= Tanjung Aru =

- Suburb of Kota Kinabalu

Other transcription(s)
  - Chinese: 丹绒亚路
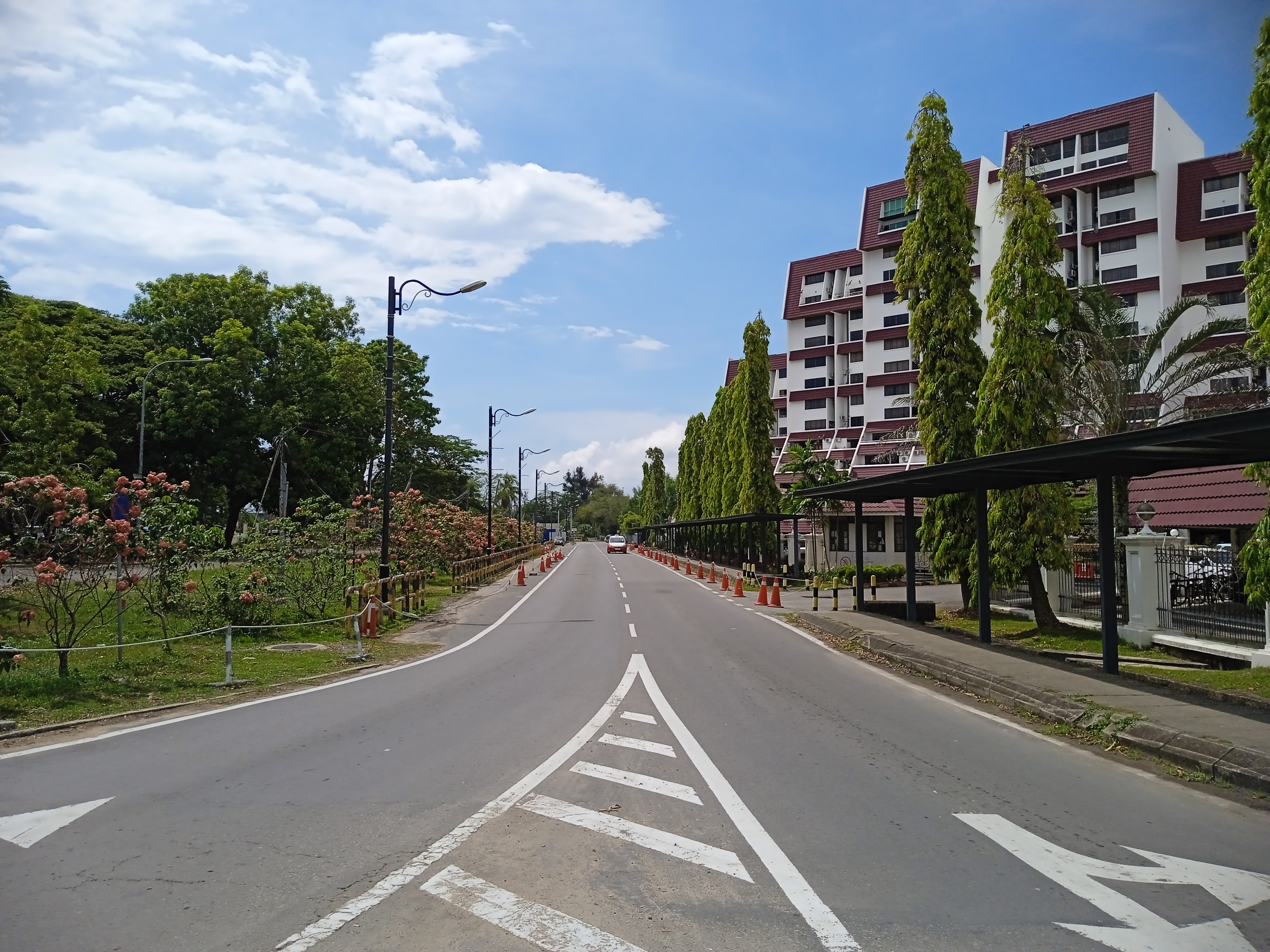
- Jalan Aru in Tanjung Aru

- Tanjung Aru in Sabah, East Malaysia and Malaysia Tanjung Aru (East Malaysia) Tanjung Aru (Malaysia)
- Coordinates: 5°56′44″N 116°3′1″E
- Country: Malaysia
- State: Sabah
- District: Kota Kinabalu
- Time zone: UTC+8 (MYT)
- Postal code: 88100

Tanjung Aru is a sub-district of Kota Kinabalu in Sabah, of Malaysia. Its main feature is its beach called Tanjung Aru Beach which stretches to over 2 kilometres long along with new skyscrapers. This beach has a lot of Casuarina equisetifolia trees (aru) there naming this town.

It also has its own township called Tanjung Aru Town. Other notable features include the Perdana Park, the Kinabalu Golf Club, the Kinabalu Yacht Club, and the Tanjung Aru railway station of Sabah State Railway.

== Education ==
- La Salle Secondary School, Kota Kinabalu
- Stella Maris Secondary School
- Stella Maris Primary School
- Tanjung Aru Primary School 1 & 2

== Libraries ==
- Tanjung Aru Library

== Place of Worship ==
=== Mosque (Muslim) ===
- Masjid Al Kauthar

=== Churches (Christian) ===
- Tanjung Aru SDA Church
- Calvary Charismatic Centre
- Stella Maris Catholic Church
- BCCM Tanjung Aru
- True Jesus Church

== Hotels ==
- Shangri-La's Tanjung Aru Beach Resort & Spa
- C'haya Hotel
- Sutera Harbour Resort
- Seapark Condotel
- Megah D' Aru
- Casuarina Hotel
- Aru Suites
- Goldenhill Hotel

== In popular culture ==
The neighbourhood of Tanjung Aru Village served as the 3rd Pit Stop in the 24th season of American edition of The Amazing Race and the 2nd Pit Stop in 4th season of the Asian version.

== Gallery ==
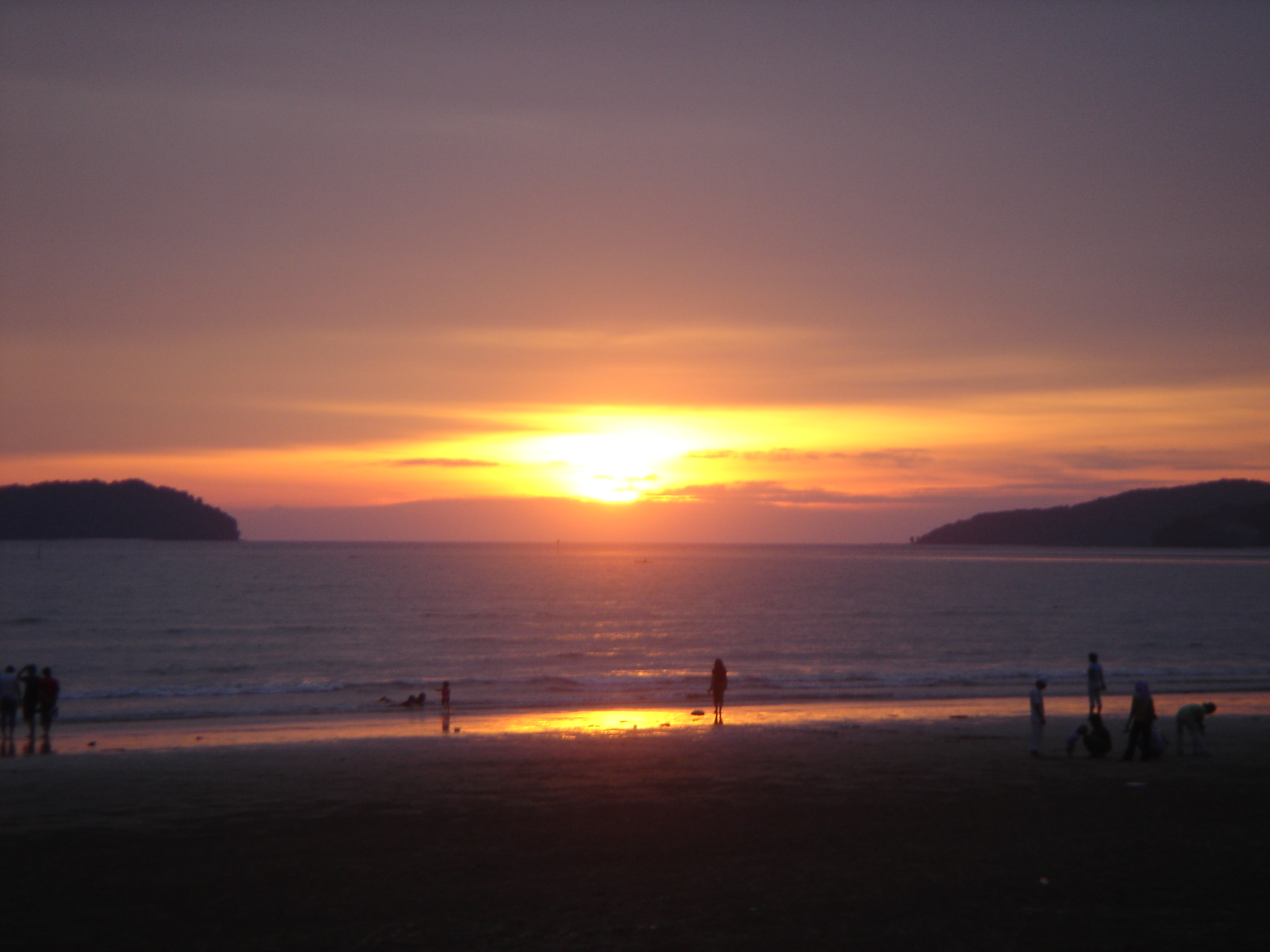
Sunset at Tanjung Aru beach. Pulau Sulug can be seen on the left and Pulau Manukan on the right of the horizon.

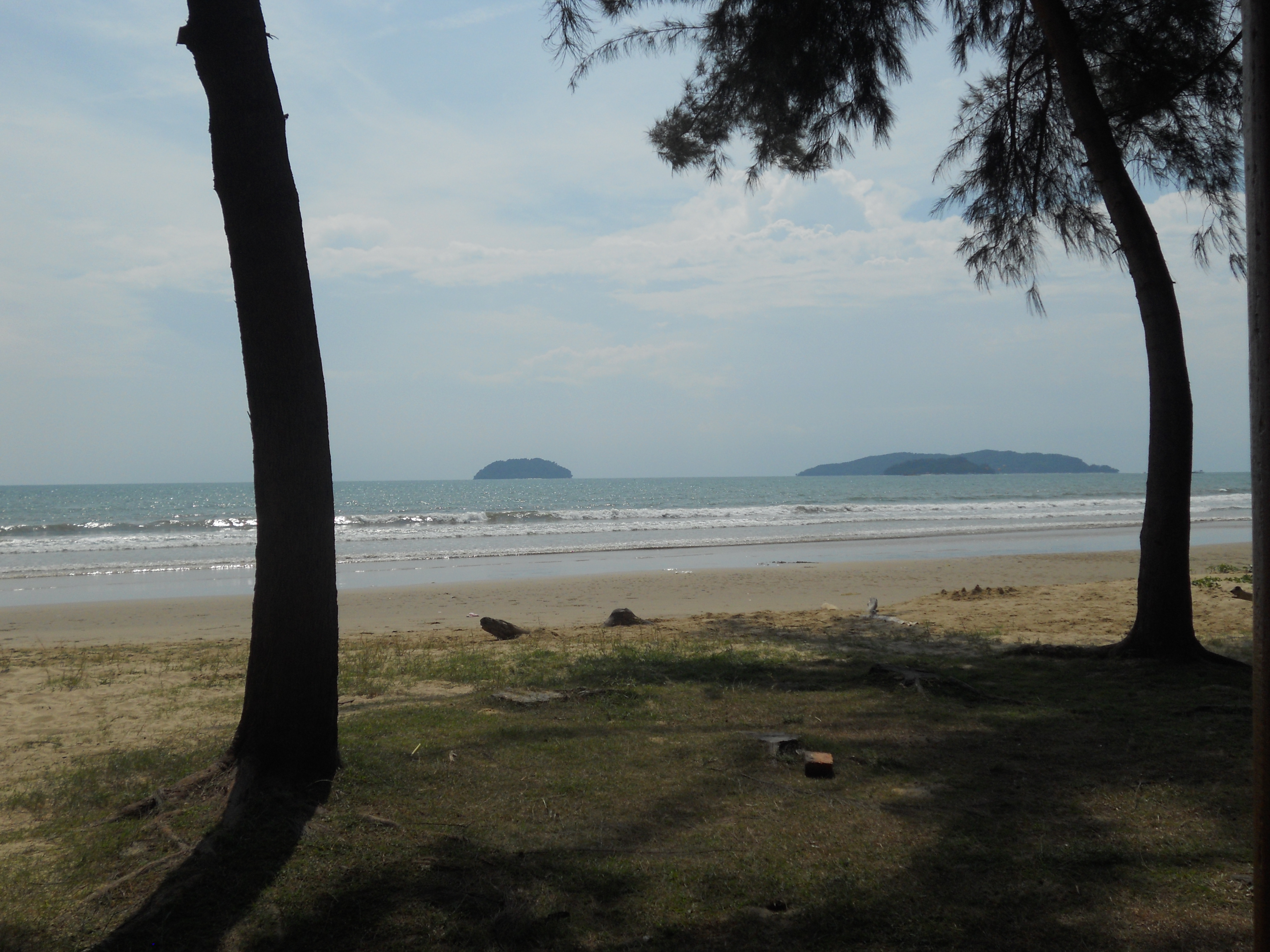
Tanjung Aru beach. Pulau Sulug can be seen on the left and Pulau Manukan on the right of the horizon.

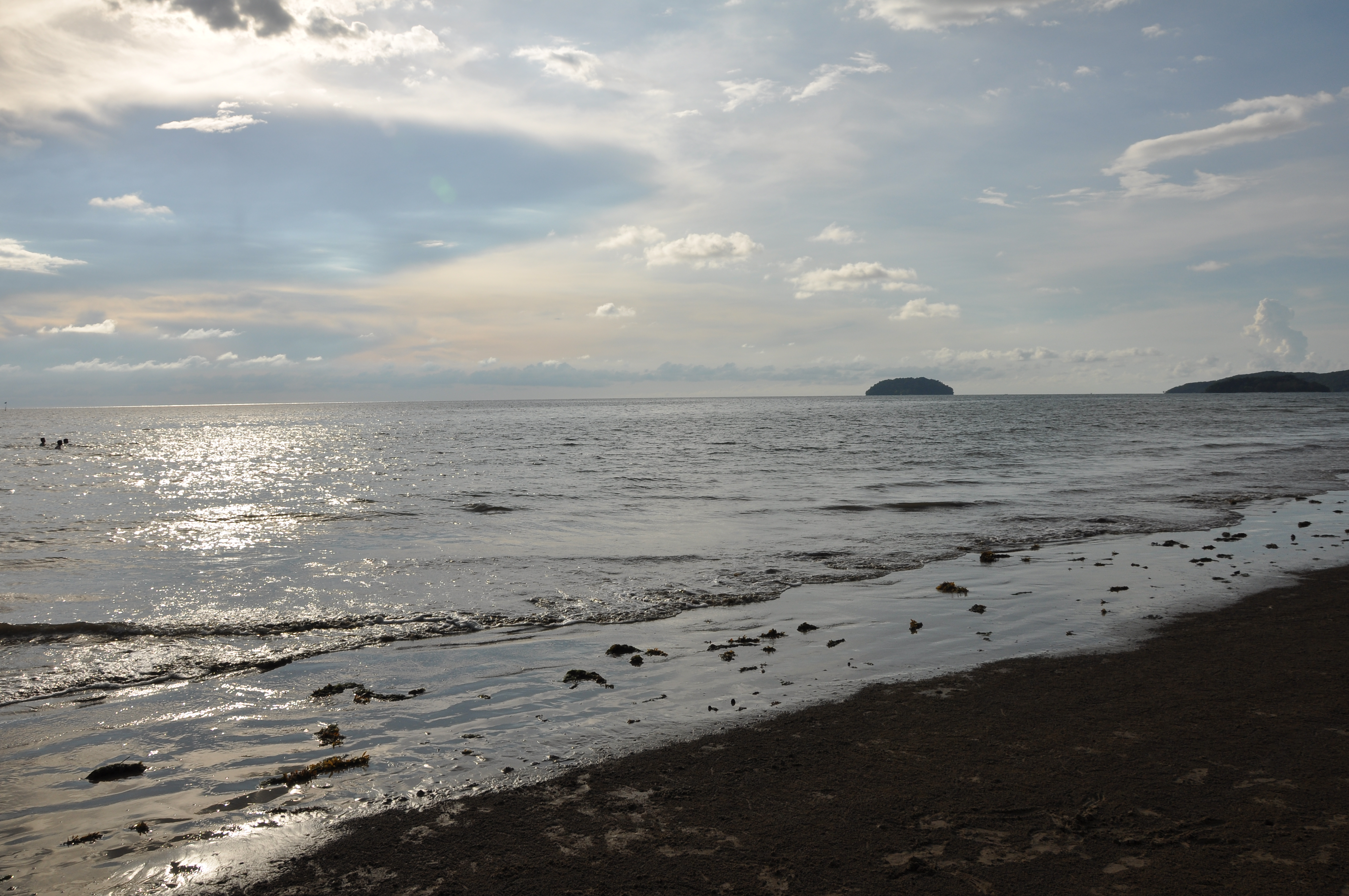
Tanjung Aru Beach, the islands of Sulug, Manukan and Mamutik can be seen

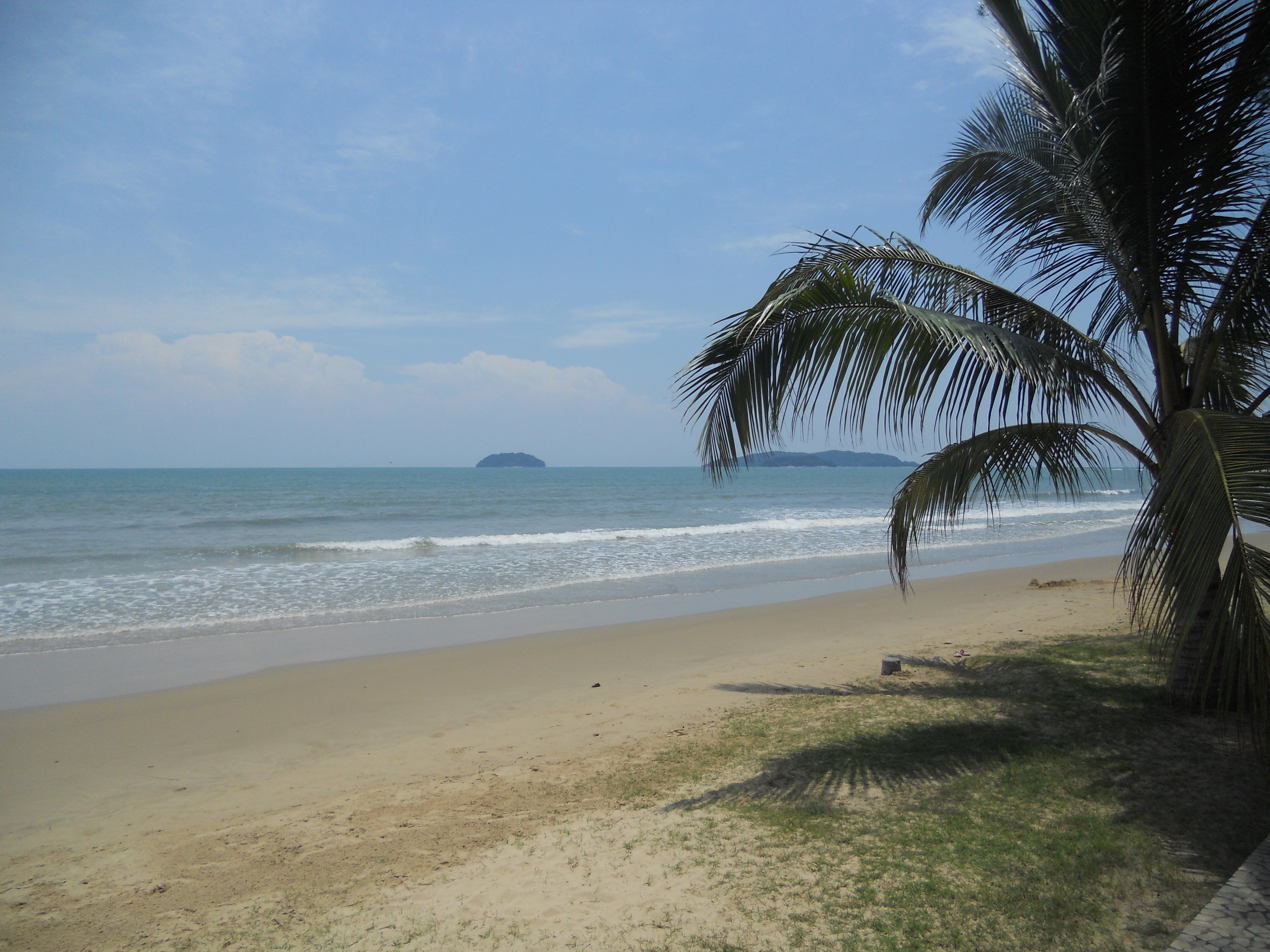
Tanjung Aru Beach, with the islands of Sulug, Manukan and Mamutik in the distance

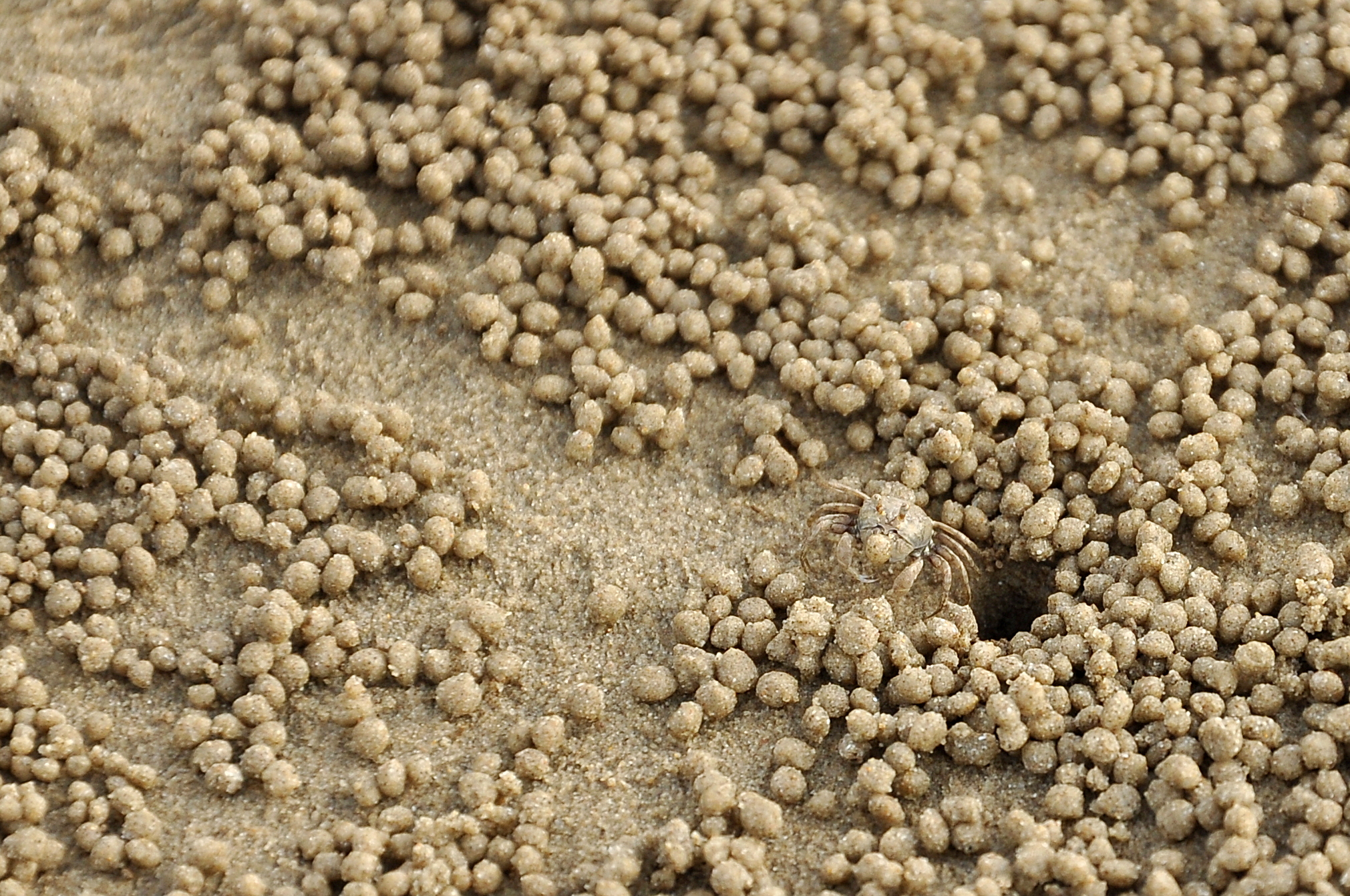
Sand bubbler crabs (Scopimera) in Tanjung Aru Beach

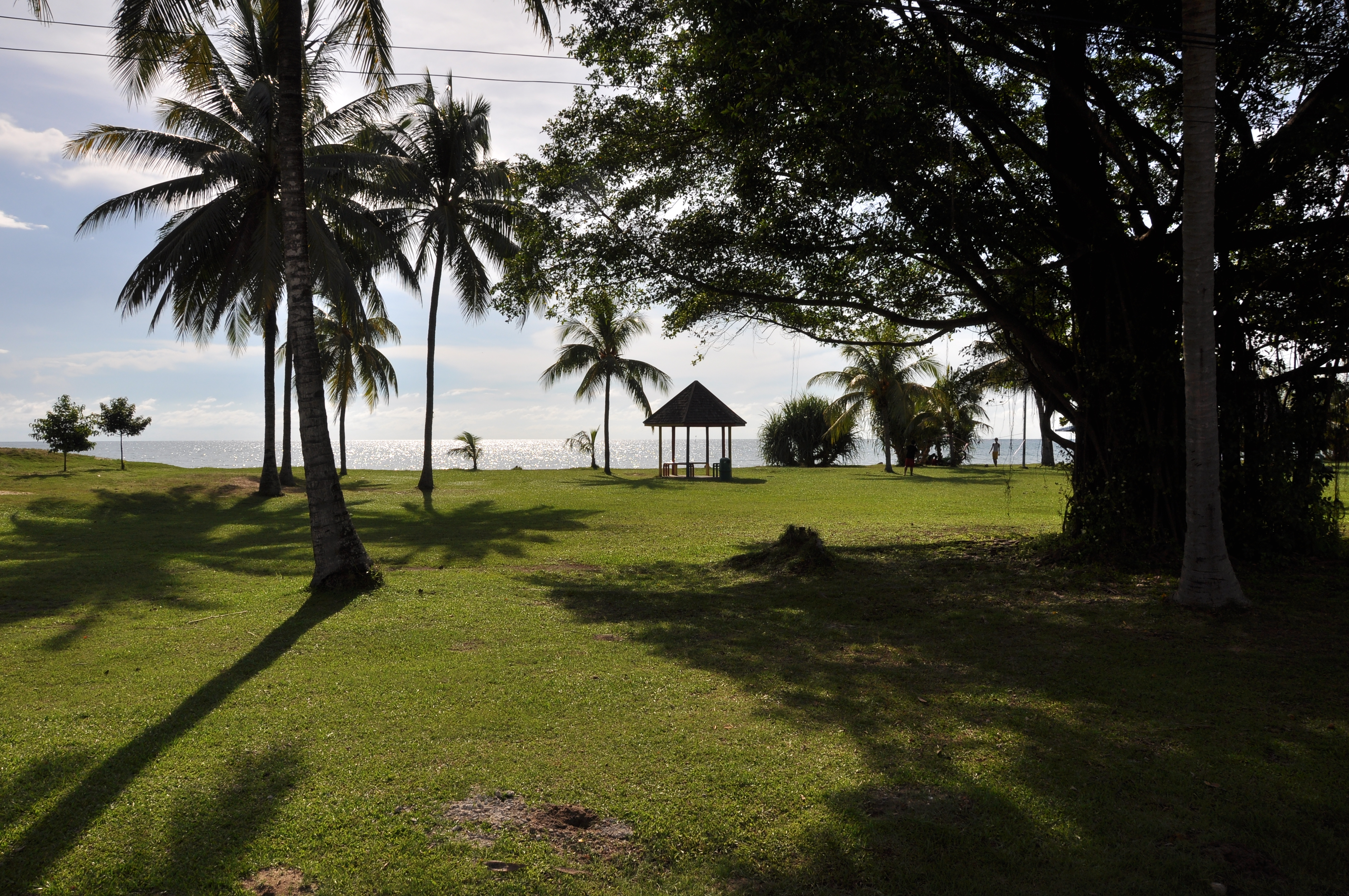
Park between the beach and the road leading to the resort in Tanjung Aru Beach

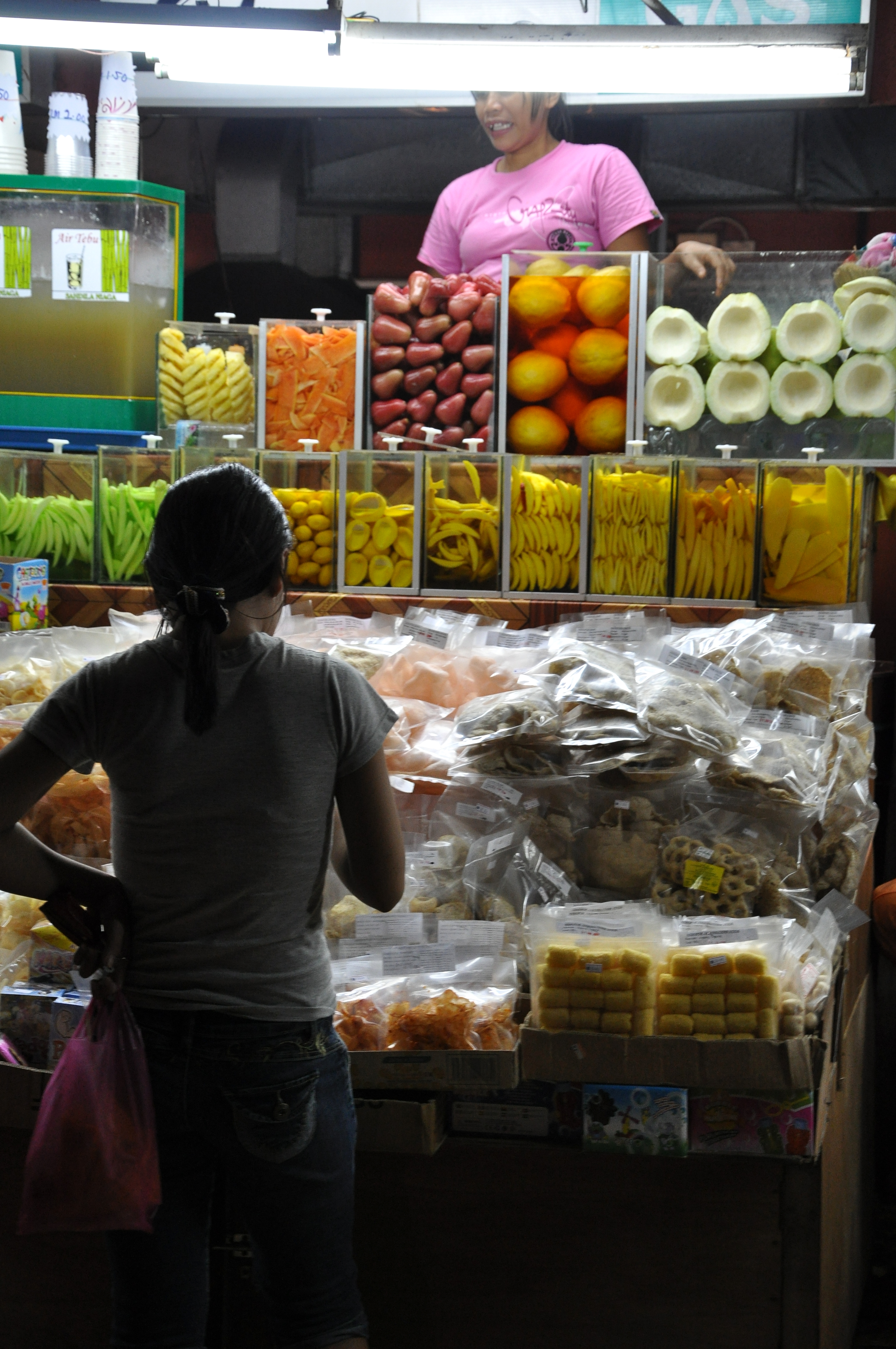
Stall in the Tanjung Aru beach food hawker court selling "ready to eat" fruit, dried fish and seafood snacks

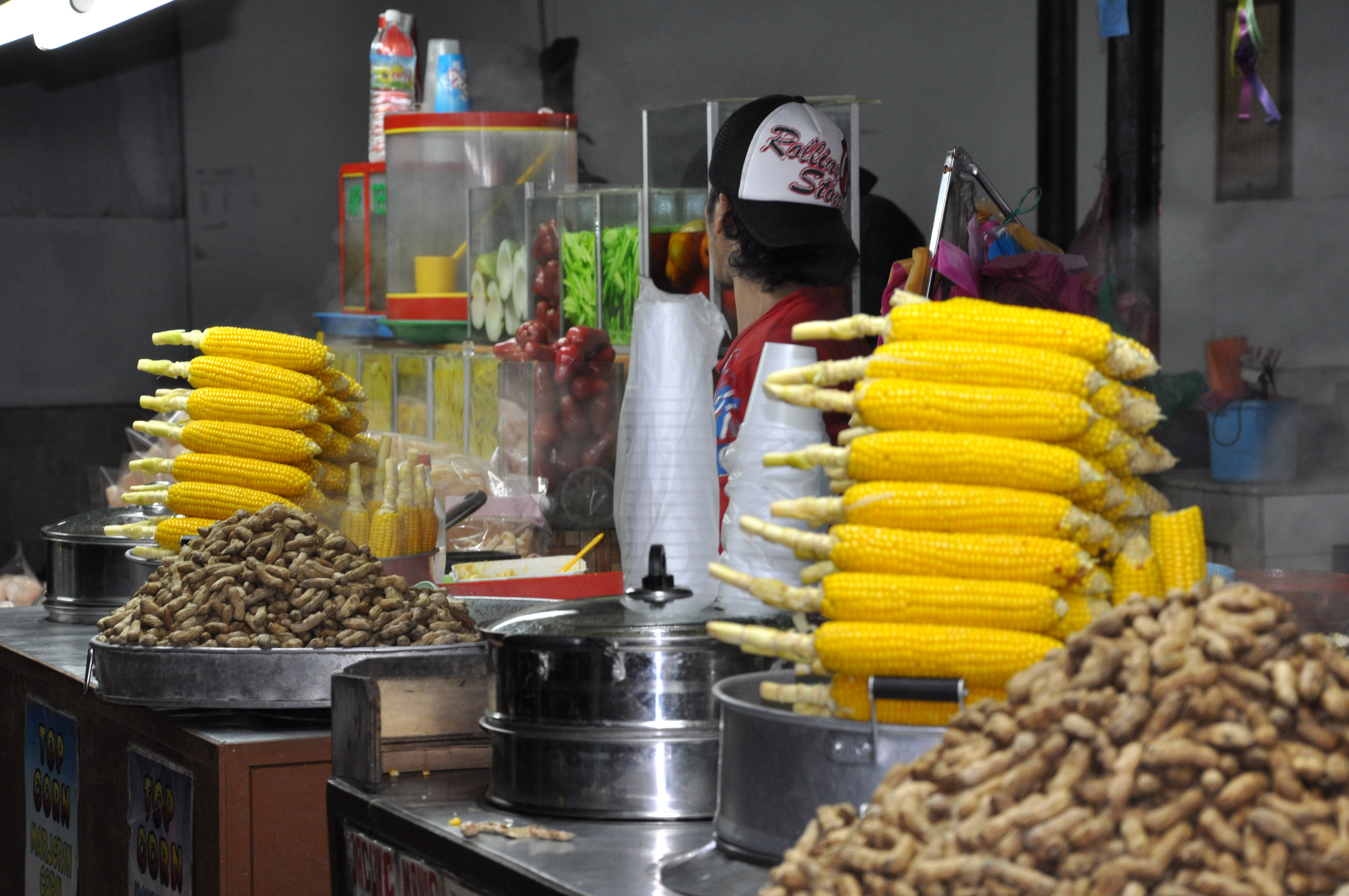
Stall in the Tanjung Aru beach food hawker court selling roasted peanuts and boiled corn

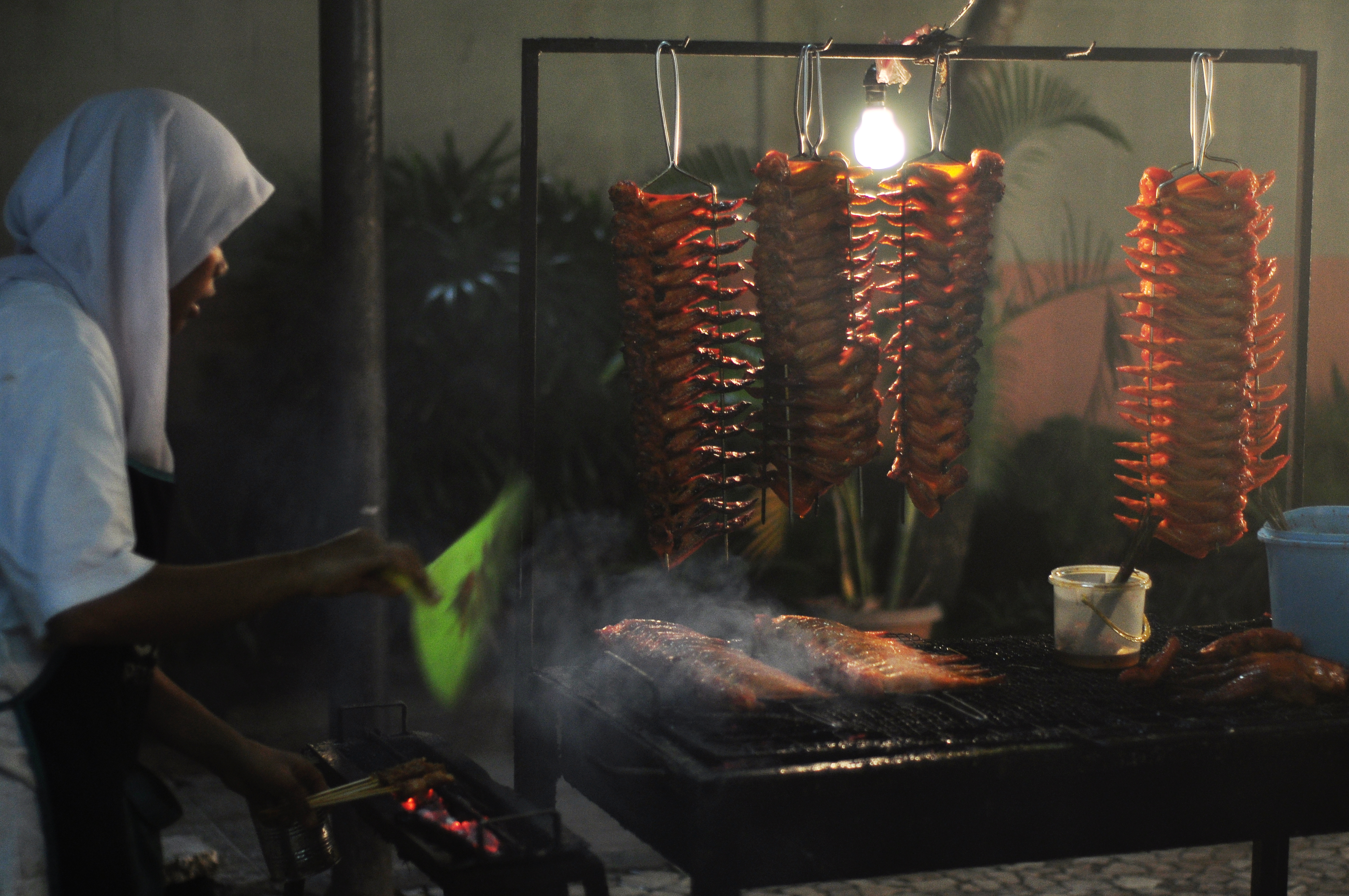
Girl cooking satay next to a chicken wing grill in the Tanjung Aru beach food hawker court

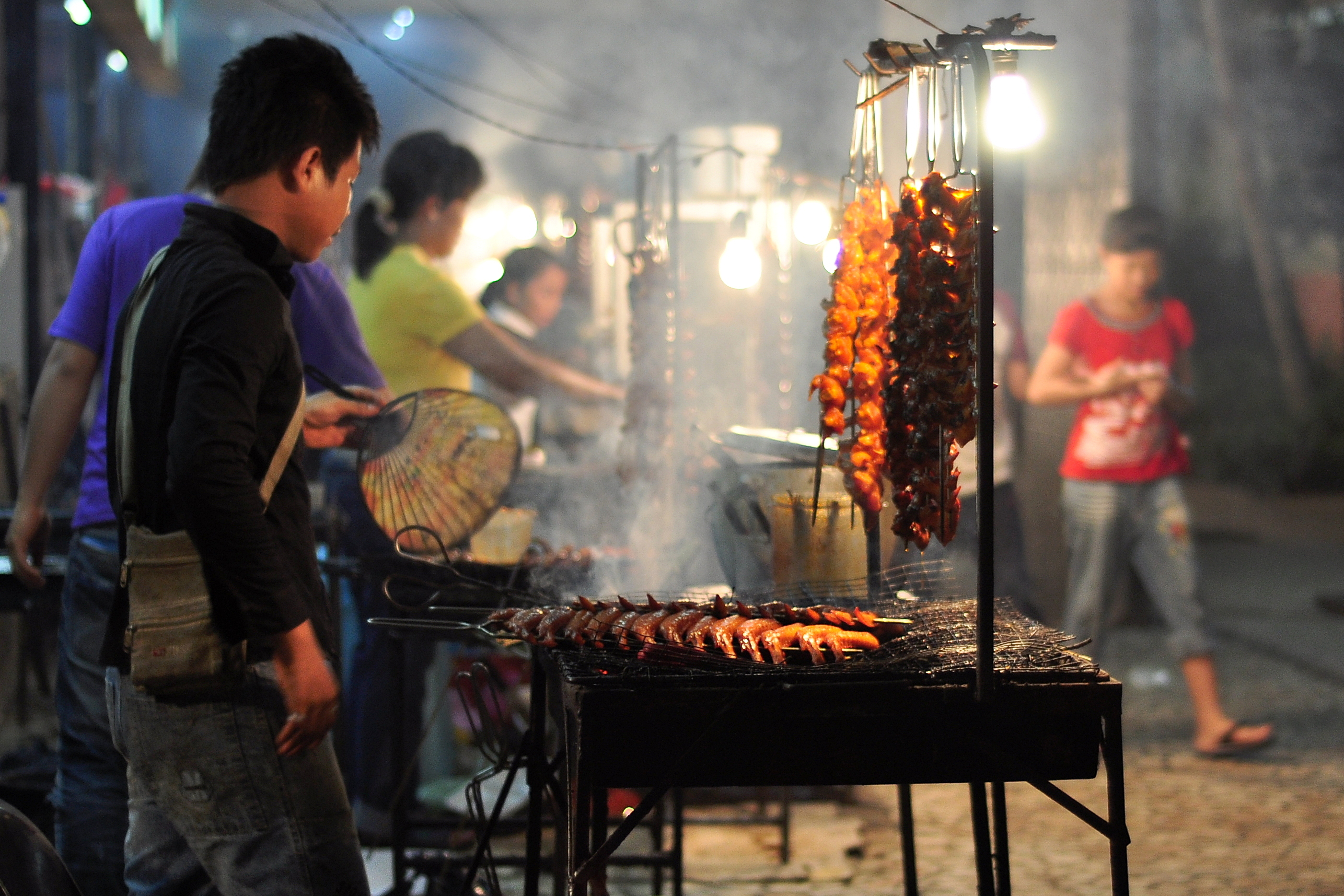
Stall selling chicken wings in the hawker court

== Politics ==
- Sabah
  - Parliament - Putatan
  - State - Tanjung Aru
  - Local Government - Kota Kinabalu City Hall

== See also ==
- Tanjung Aru Eco Development
