= Sabah State Mosque =

Mosque in Kota Kinabalu, Sabah, Malaysia

- Masjid Negeri Sabah
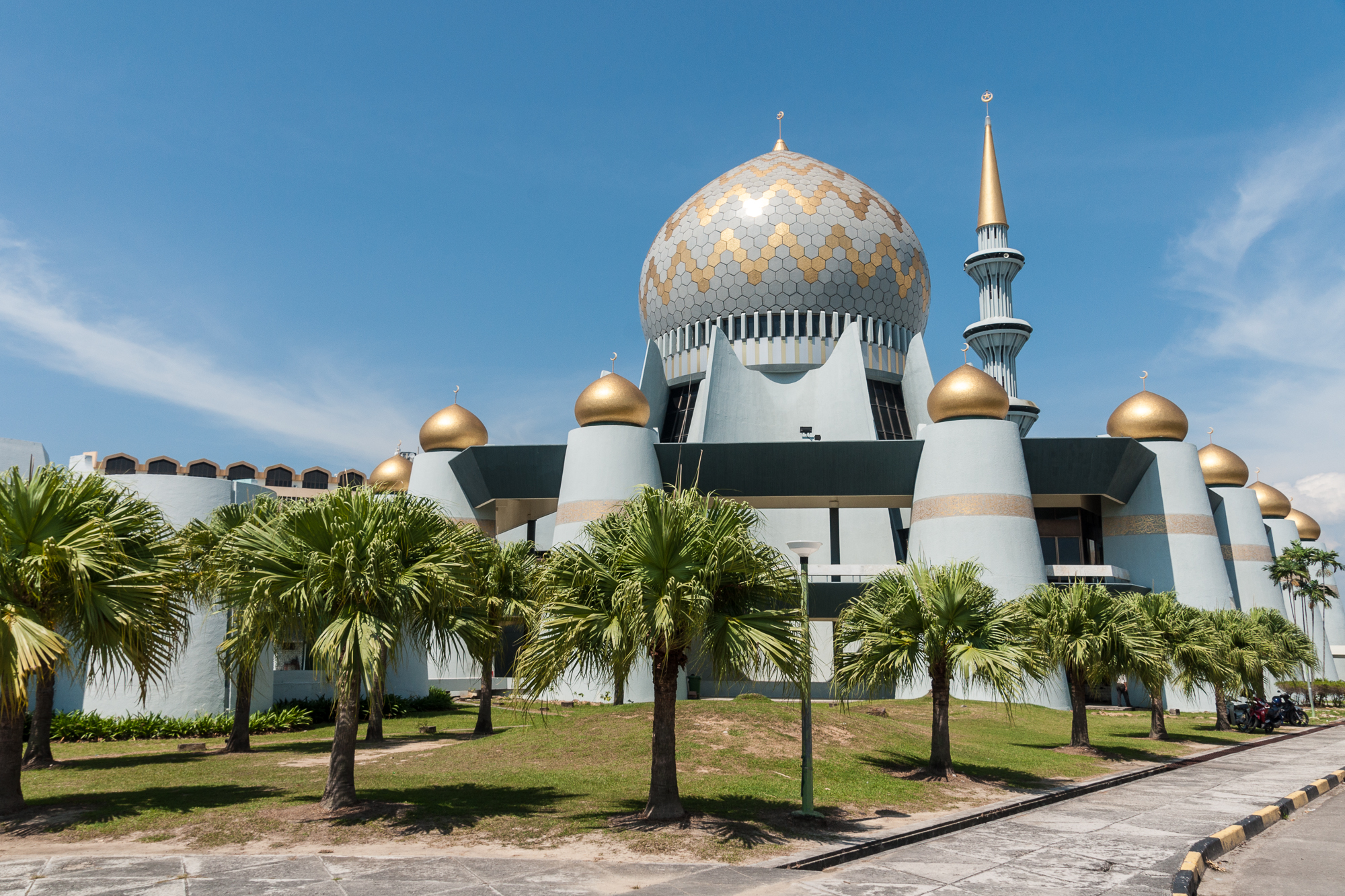

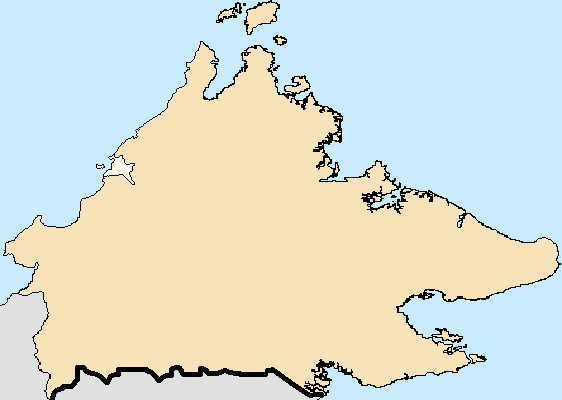
- Location within Kota Kinabalu

Religion
- Affiliation: Islam

Location
- Location: Kota Kinabalu, Sabah, Malaysia
- Interactive map of Sabah State Mosque
- Coordinates: 5°57′36″N 116°4′2″E

Architecture
- Architect: Architects Team 3
- Type: mosque
- Completed: 1975
- Capacity: 5,000 worshippers

Sabah State Mosque (Malay: Masjid Negeri Sabah) is the state mosque of Sabah, in Kota Kinabalu, Malaysia. It is located at Bulatan Sembulan on Jalan Tunku Abdul Rahman.

== History ==
Construction of the mosque began in 1970 and was completed in 1975. It was officially opened on 28 June 1977 by the Yang di-Pertuan Agong, Tuanku Yahya Petra.

Architects Team 3 completed the mosque in 1975, with the design led by Baharuddin Abu Kassim. The mosque can accommodate 5,000 worshippers.

== Sabah State Mausoleum ==
Former Sabah Yang di-Pertua Negeri Mohamad Adnan Robert was buried at the Sabah State Mosque in 2003.

== Gallery ==
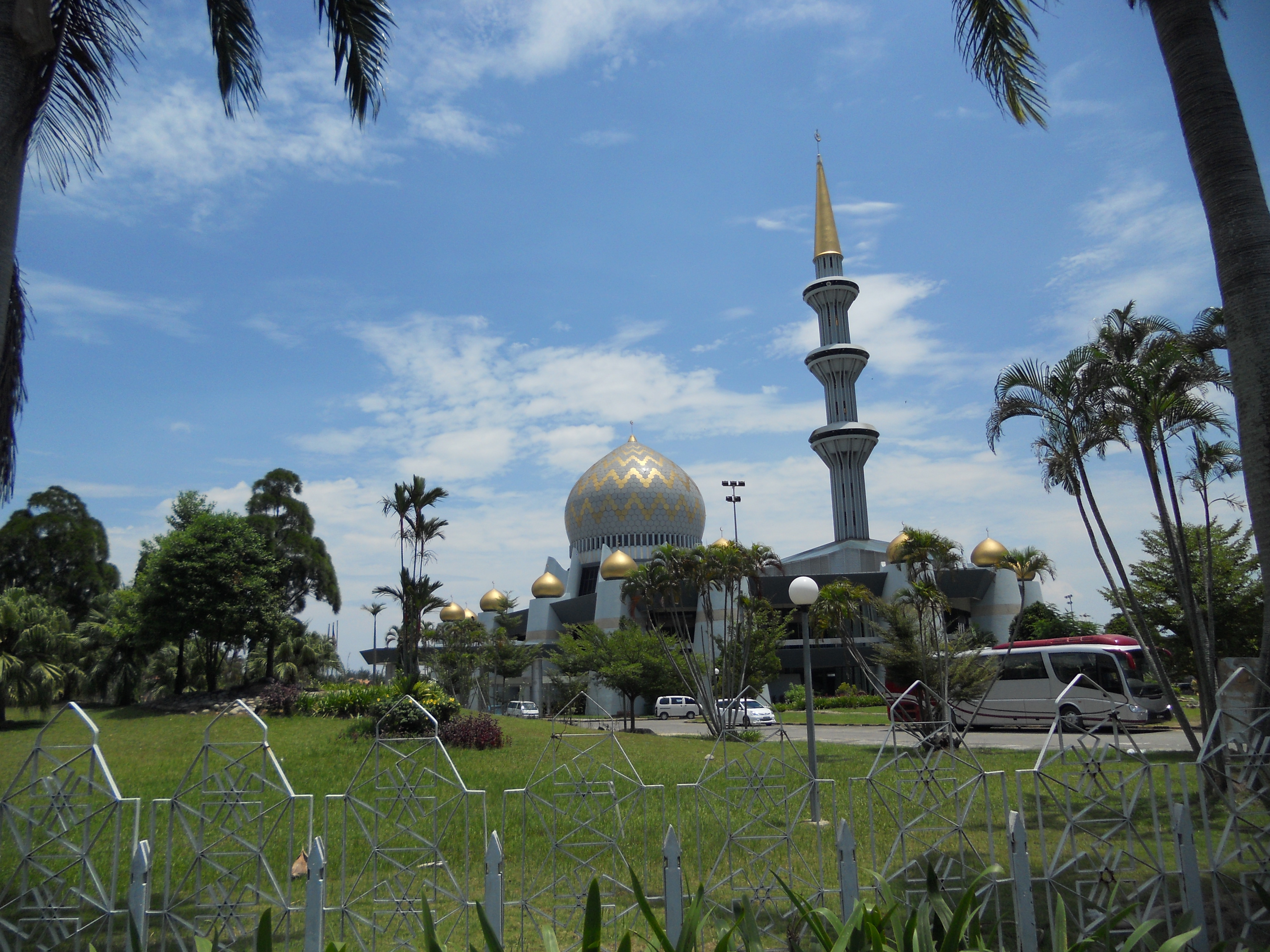
Street view of Sabah State Mosque

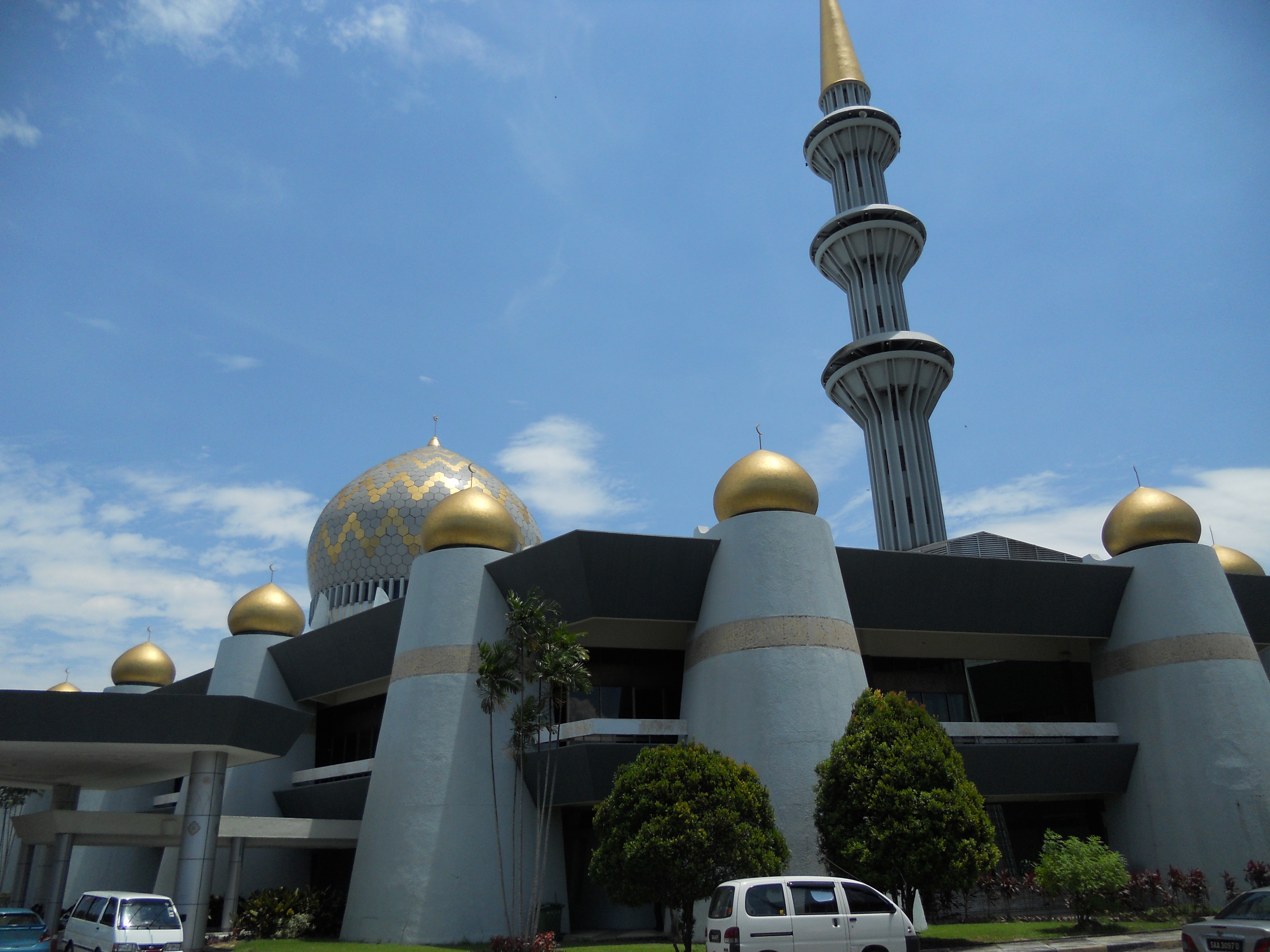
Close up view of Sabah State Mosque

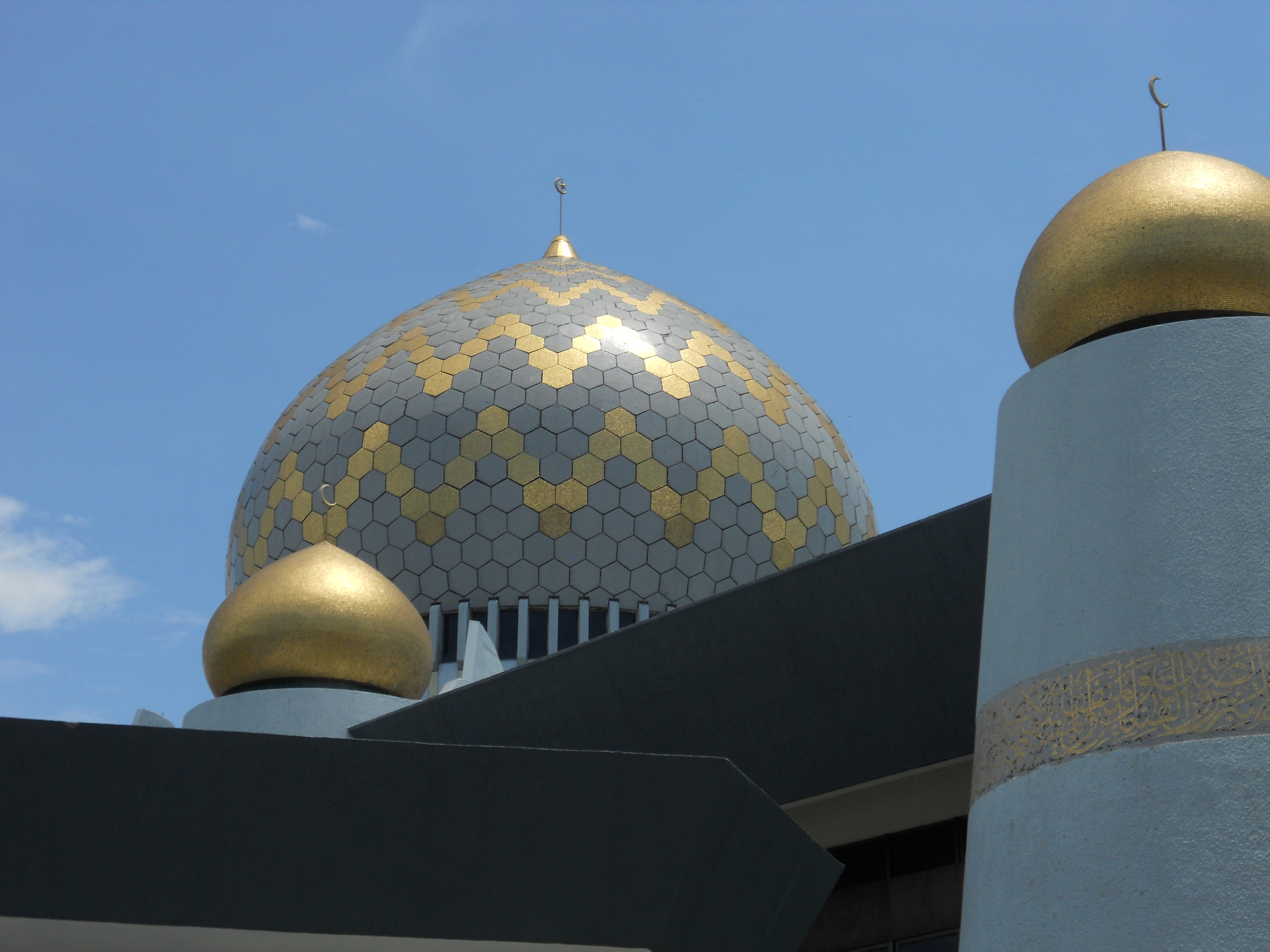
Dome of Sabah State Mosque

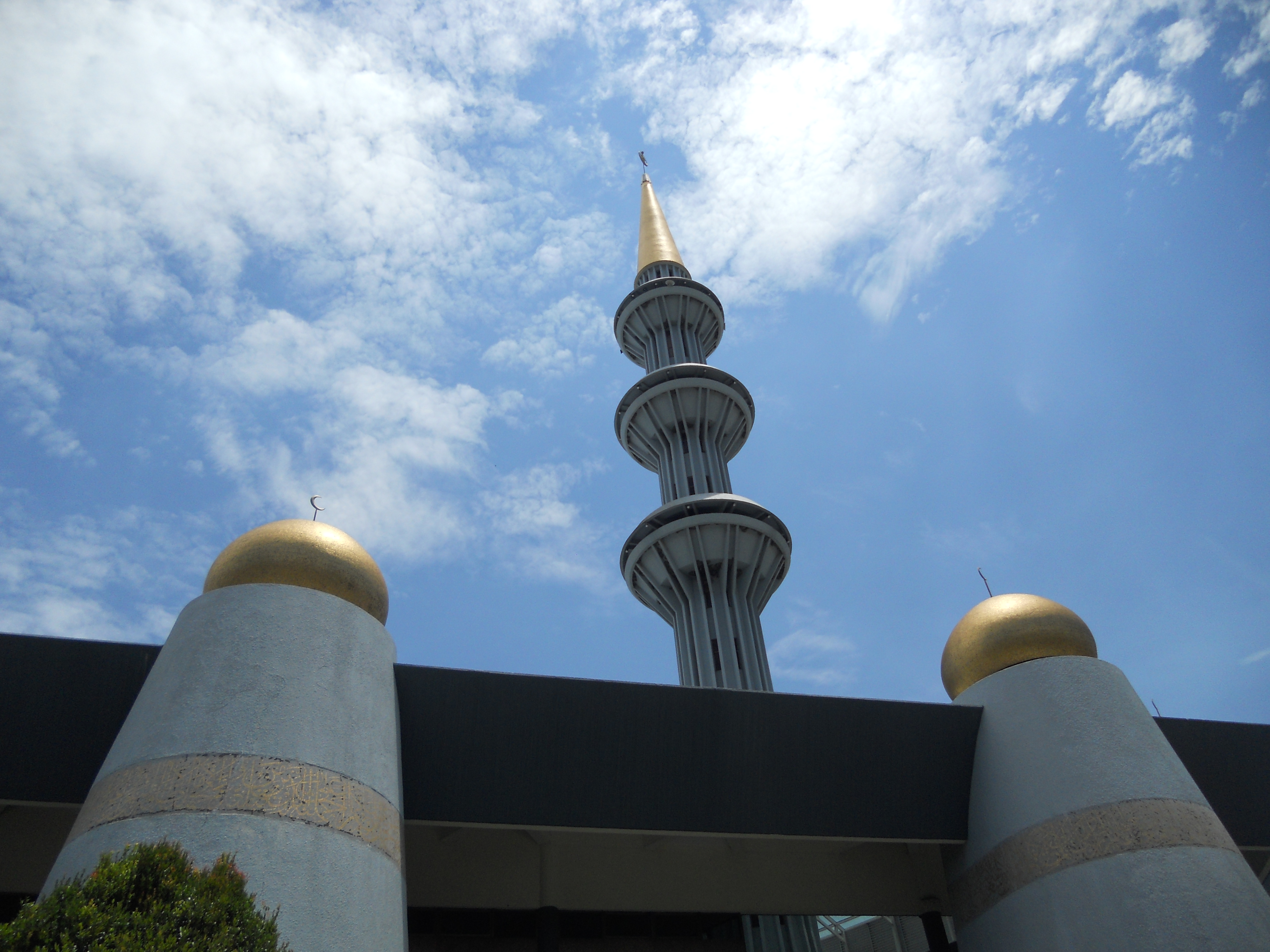
Minaret of Sabah State Mosque

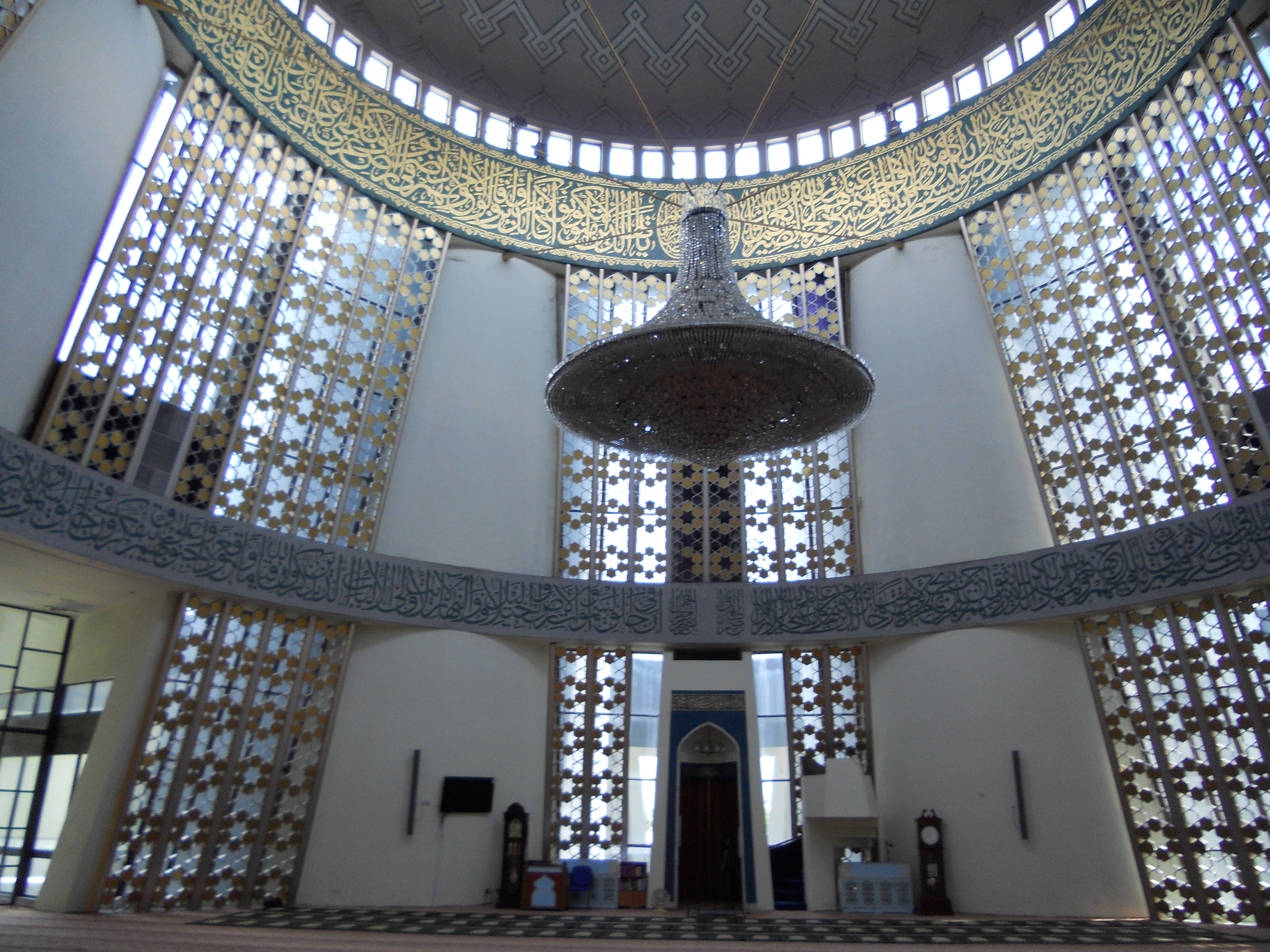
Inside of Sabah State Mosque

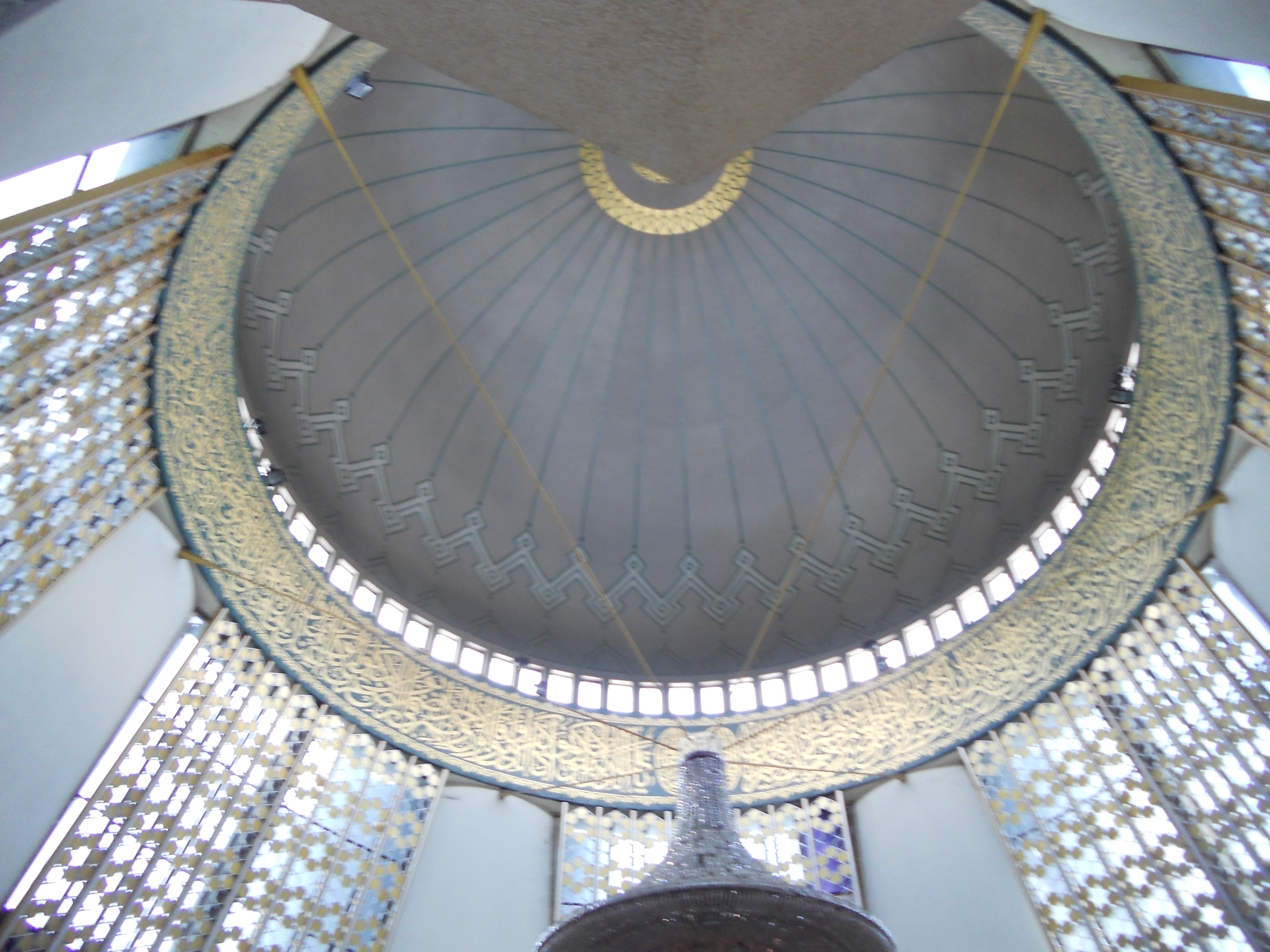
Inside roof of Sabah State Mosque

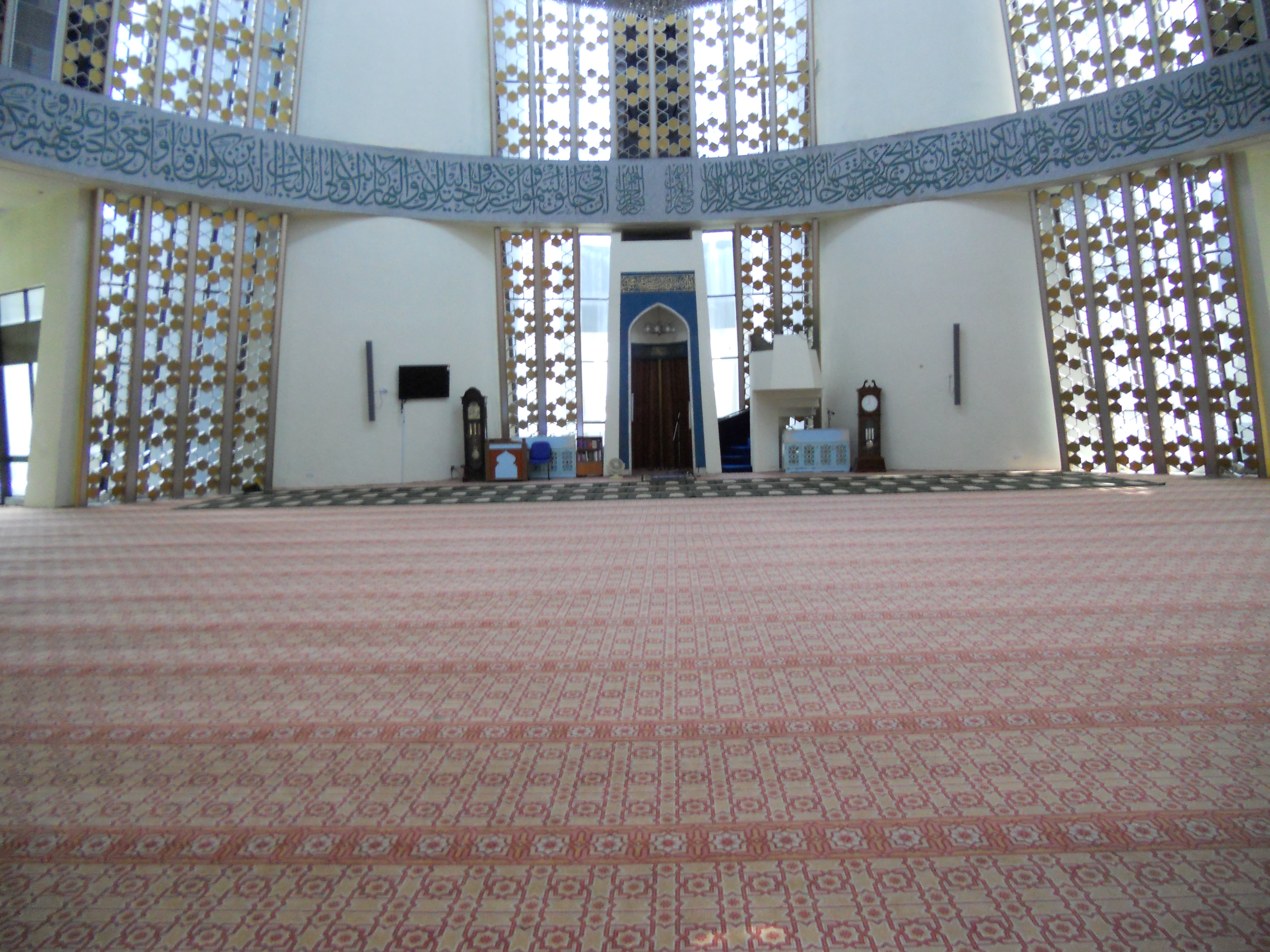
Inside floor of Sabah State Mosque
