= 2019 AFC Asian Cup bids =

The bidding process for the 2019 AFC Asian Cup was the process by which the location for the 2019 AFC Asian Cup that United Arab Emirates was chosen as the hosts. The process officially began on 15 December 2012 and ended on 2 February 2013.

The AFC Competitions Committee confirmed on 12 March 2013 that 11 countries expressed interest in hosting the 2019 AFC Asian Cup: Bahrain, China, Iran, Kuwait, Lebanon, Malaysia, Myanmar, Oman, Saudi Arabia, Thailand and the United Arab Emirates. Lebanon, Malaysia and Myanmar pulled out before the deadline to submit all documents on 31 August 2013.

The tournament will be expanded from 16 to 24 teams.

== Bidding process ==
The bidding procedure and timeline was approved at the AFC congress that was held on 28 November 2012. Presentation files of each bid have to be submitted by 1 May 2013. Following this, inspections of facilities and infrastructure of the bidding nations is expected to be conducted between October and December 2013. Bidding nations will then have to prepare their final presentation by May 2014, the final deadline. The winning bid was originally set to be announced at an AFC congress in June, then November 2014.

At its 60th-anniversary celebrations at the end of 2014, a date of 'summer 2015' was given to when an announcement would be made.

== Bids ==
=== Iran ===
After their unsuccessful bid to host the 2011 AFC Asian Cup, Iranian Football Federation president Ali Kafashian stated the renewed intentions for the country to host the 2019 AFC Asian Cup. Iran has previously hosted editions in 1968 and 1976, in which Iran won in both editions. The federation has proposed the use of stadia: Shahid Bahonar Stadium in Kerman, Nagshe Jahan Stadium in Isfahan, Imam Reza Stadium in Mashhad, Sahand Stadium in Tabriz, Azadi Stadium and Takhti Stadium in Tehran, and Shiraz Stadium in Shiraz.

The following are the host cities and venues selected for Iran's bid:

Tehran		Isfahan
Azadi Stadium	Takhti Stadium	Naghsh-e Jahan Stadium
Capacity: 78,116	Capacity: 30,122	Capacity: 75,000
Tabriz	2019 AFC Asian Cup bids is located in Iran	
Yadegar-e Emam Stadium	2019 AFC Asian Cup bids is located in Iran	
Capacity: 66,833	2019 AFC Asian Cup bids is located in Iran	
Shiraz	Mashhad	Kerman
Pars Stadium	Imam Reza Stadium	Shahid Bahonar Stadium
Capacity: 50,000	Capacity: 27,700	Capacity: 15,403

=== United Arab Emirates ===
The United Arab Emirates Football Association also confirmed their bid by handing in their formal bid papers on the final day the Asian Football Confederation would accept applications. If selected, it would be the second time the UAE has hosted the AFC Asian Cup, having hosted the event in 1996. On 29 May 2014, a delegation from the UAE visited the AFC to submit their bid book.

The following host cities and stadiums were selected for the United Arab Emirates's bids:

Abu Dhabi		Dubai
Zayed Sports City Stadium	Mohammed bin Zayed Stadium	DSC Stadium
Capacity: 63,578	Capacity: 42,056	Capacity: 60,500
2019 AFC Asian Cup bids is located in United Arab Emirates
Al Ain		Dubai
Hazza bin Zayed Stadium	Sheikh Khalifa International Stadium	Al Ahli Stadium
Capacity: 25,965	Capacity: 20,174	Capacity: 25,132

== Cancelled bids ==
=== Bahrain ===
- On 22 January 2013, Bahrain announced their bid for the 2019 AFC Asian Cup.
- On 2 May 2013, Salman Bin Ibrahim Al-Khalifa became the President of the AFC, which gave added impetus to the Bahraini bid to host the Asian Cup, followed by hosting the World Cup in the next 50 years.
- On 7 September 2013, Bahrain announced that they withdrew from bidding to make way for the other GCC national federations who are interested in hosting the quadrennial showcase.

=== China ===
- On 3 February 2013, China suggested their interest in hosting the competition, On 15 March 2013, the CFA had sent the consultation letter for hosting 2019 AFC Asian Cup to local Associations for the second time, until 7 April 2013, 9 cities had sent hosting request to the CFA, namely Beijing, Dalian, Nanjing, Xi'an, Chengdu, Qingdao, Changsha, Guangzhou and Wuhan. China has previously hosted the edition in 2004.
- In September 2013, it was reported that the Chinese Football Association withdrew its bid to "concentrate on our young players' development".

=== Lebanon ===
- On 24 January 2013, the Lebanese Football Federation announced their bid to host the 2019 AFC Asian Cup. Lebanon previously hosted the edition in 2000. But later they withdrew for the reformation of Lebanese football.

=== Malaysia ===
- On 10 April 2013, the Football Association of Malaysia (FAM) announced its bid to host the 2019 AFC Asian Cup, with the general secretary of the FAM stating that the country already had the necessary infrastructure to host the event. Malaysia has previously hosted the edition in 2007 along with Indonesia, Thailand and Vietnam

=== Oman ===
- As well as being confirmed hosts of the inaugural Under 22 Asian Cup and some Under 14 regional qualifiers, Oman has applied to host the 2019 Asian Cup by submitting its bid within the required timeframe. The General secretary of the Oman Football Association has suggested that the national stadium would require upgrading to a capacity of 40,000.

=== Saudi Arabia ===
Saudi Arabia also confirmed they would be competing to host the competition, with Prince Nawaf bin Faisal (president of Youth Welfare), saying authorities had approved the Saudi Arabian Olympic Committee's plan. This is the first time it has made a bid to host the Asian Cup.They eventually were awarded the 2027 edition.

=== Thailand ===
Thailand was the venue for 1972 edition and last hosted in 2007, serving as co-hosts with Malaysia, Vietnam and Indonesia. 5 cities have sent hosting requests to the FAT, including Bangkok, Nonthaburi, Pathumthani, Chiang Mai and Nakhon Ratchasima.
