= Sharkari's bent-toed gecko =

Conservation status
- Vulnerable (IUCN 3.1)

Scientific classification
- Kingdom: Animalia
- Phylum: Chordata
- Class: Reptilia
- Order: Squamata
- Suborder: Gekkota
- Family: Gekkonidae
- Genus: Cyrtodactylus
- Species: C. sharkari

Binomial name
- Cyrtodactylus sharkari Grismer, Wood, Anuar, Quah, Muin, Mohamed, Onn, Sumarli, Loredo & Heinz, 2014

Species of lizard

Sharkari's bent-toed gecko (Cyrtodactylus sharkari) is a species of lizard in the family Gekkonidae. The species is endemic to Peninsular Malaysia.

== Etymology ==
The specific name, sharkari, is in honor of Indonesian politician Mohd Sharkar Shamsudin for his work in conservation.

== Geographic range ==
C. sharkari is found in northeastern Peninsular Malaysia, in the federal state of Pahang.

== Habitat ==
The preferred natural habitats of C. sharkari are forest and rocky areas.

== Description ==
C. sharkari may attain a snout-to-vent length (SVL) of 10 cm (3.9 in).

== Reproduction ==
The mode of reproduction of C. sharkari is unknown.
