= Temerloh (federal constituency) =

Federal constituency of Pahang, Malaysia

Temerloh (P088)
Pahang constituency

Federal constituency
- Legislature: Dewan Rakyat
- MP: Salamiah Mohd Nor; PN
- Constituency created: 1958
- First contested: 1959
- Last contested: 2022

Demographics
- Population (2020): 141,781
- Electors (2022): 106,829
- Area (km²): 1,181
- Pop. density (per km²): 120.1

Temerloh is a federal constituency in Temerloh District, Pahang, Malaysia, that has been represented in the Dewan Rakyat since 1959.

The federal constituency was created in the 1958 redistribution and is mandated to return a single member to the Dewan Rakyat under the first past the post voting system.

== Demographics ==
https://live.chinapress.com.my/ge15/parliament/PAHANG

Ethnic breakdown of Temerloh's electorate as of 2022
1. Malay (66.3%)
2. Chinese (21.0%)
3. Indian (8.10%)
4. Other ethnicities (4.70%)

As of 2020, Temerloh has a population of 141,781 people.

Age breakdown of Temerloh's electorate as of 2022
1. 18-20 (6.72%)
2. 21-29 (23.8%)
3. 30-39 (24.2%)
4. 40-49 (16.1%)
5. 50-59 (13.1%)
6. 60-69 (9.96%)
7. 70-79 (4.31%)
8. 80-89 (1.46%)
9. above 90 (0.29%)
Gender breakdown of Temerloh's electorate as of 2022
1. Male (50.2%)
2. Female (49.8%)

== History ==
=== Polling districts ===
According to the federal gazette issued on 31 October 2022, the Temerloh constituency is divided into 44 polling districts.

State constituency	Polling district	Code	Location
Mentakab (N30)	Taman Rimba	088/30/01	Kawasan Lapang Jalan Bendera Puteri Taman Bukit Bendera Mentakab
Mentakab (N30)	Bukit Bendera	088/30/02	SMJK Hwa Lian
Mentakab (N30)	Bandar Mentakab	088/30/03	SJK (T) Mentakab
Mentakab (N30)	Sungai Semantan	088/30/04	Dewan Seri Mentakab
Mentakab (N30)	Tanjung Kerayong	088/30/05	SK Abu Bakar
Mentakab (N30)	Kampung Baharu	088/30/06	SJK (C) Mentakab 1
Mentakab (N30)	Kampung Sungai Ara	088/30/07	SK Bandar Mentakab
Mentakab (N30)	Mentakab Tengah	088/30/08	SJK (C) Mentakab 2
Mentakab (N30)	Taman Ksm	088/30/09	SMK Mentakab
Mentakab (N30)	Kampung Chatin	088/30/10	SMK Bukit Cermin
Mentakab (N30)	Sri Kemuning	088/30/11	SK Tanjong Lalang
Mentakab (N30)	Temerloh Jaya	088/30/12	SK Temerloh Jaya
Lanchang (N31)	Tanjung Belengu	088/31/01	SK Lebak; SK Belengu
Lanchang (N31)	Pangsenam	088/31/02	Madrasah Ad-Diniah Kg Pangsenam
Lanchang (N31)	Buntut Pulau	088/31/03	SK Kampung Tengah
Lanchang (N31)	Ladang Yeow Cheng Luan	088/31/04	SJK (C) Yeow Cheng Luan
Lanchang (N31)	Desa Bakti	088/31/05	SK Desa Bakti
Lanchang (N31)	Sri Layang	088/31/06	SMK Seri Semantan
Lanchang (N31)	Batu Kapur	088/31/07	SK Batu Kapor
Lanchang (N31)	Ladang Edensor	088/31/08	SJK (T) Ladang Edensor
Lanchang (N31)	Sungai Kepong	088/31/09	Balai Raya Sungai Kepong
Lanchang (N31)	Rantau Panjang	088/31/10	SK Rantau Panjang
Lanchang (N31)	Kampung Dala	088/31/11	Balai Raya Kampung Dala
Lanchang (N31)	Kuala Kawang	088/31/12	SK Kuala Kaung
Lanchang (N31)	Bandar Lanchang	088/31/13	SMK Lanchang
Lanchang (N31)	Mempatih	088/31/14	SK Lubok Terua
Lanchang (N31)	Bolok	088/31/15	SK Bolok
Lanchang (N31)	FELDA Bukit Damar	088/31/16	SK LKTP Bukit Damar
Lanchang (N31)	FELDA Lakum	088/31/17	SK LKTP Lakum
Kuala Semantan (N32)	Sri Semantan	088/32/01	SK Mentakab Jaya
Kuala Semantan (N32)	Sanggang	088/32/02	SK Sanggang
Kuala Semantan (N32)	Songsang	088/32/03	Kolej Vokesional Temerloh
Kuala Semantan (N32)	Sanggang Seberang	088/32/04	SK Sanggang Seberang
Kuala Semantan (N32)	Kampung Gau	088/32/05	SK Sungai Gau
Kuala Semantan (N32)	Teluk Ira	088/32/06	SK Telok Ira
Kuala Semantan (N32)	Bangau	088/32/07	SK Bangau
Kuala Semantan (N32)	Bandar Temerloh	088/32/08	SJK (C) Khee Chee
Kuala Semantan (N32)	Kampung Batu	088/32/09	SMK Temerloh
Kuala Semantan (N32)	Jalan Bahagia	088/32/10	SK Jalan Bahagia
Kuala Semantan (N32)	Sri Bahagia	088/32/11	SMK Seri Bahagia
Kuala Semantan (N32)	Lubuk Pasu	088/32/12	SK Bandar Temerloh
Kuala Semantan (N32)	Tanjung Batu	088/32/13	SMK Seberang Temerloh; SK Tanjung Batu
Kuala Semantan (N32)	Paya Pulai	088/32/14	SK Paya Pulai
Kuala Semantan (N32)	Lebak Seberang	088/32/15	Balai Raya JKKK Kampung Lebak Seberang

=== Representation history ===
Members of Parliament for Temerloh
Parliament	No	Years	Member	Party	Vote Share
Constituency created from Semantan
Parliament of the Federation of Malaya
1st	P063	1959–1963	Mohamed Yusof Mahmud (محمد يوسف مهمود)	Alliance (UMNO)	8,018; 54.61%
Parliament of Malaysia
1st	P063	1963–1964	Mohamed Yusof Mahmud (محمد يوسف مهمود)	Alliance (UMNO)	8,018; 54.61%
2nd	P063	1964–1969	Mohamed Yusof Mahmud (محمد يوسف مهمود)	Alliance (UMNO)	12,311; 61.50%
		1969–1971	Parliament was suspended		
3rd	P063	1971–1973	Mohamed Yusof Mahmud (محمد يوسف مهمود)	Alliance (UMNO)	12,206; 55.26%
3rd	P063	1973–1974	Mohamed Yusof Mahmud (محمد يوسف مهمود)	BN (UMNO)	12,206; 55.26%
4th	P072	1974–1978	Hamzah Abu Samah (حمزه ابو سمح)	BN (UMNO)	14,251; 75.56%
5th	P072	1978–1982	Hamzah Abu Samah (حمزه ابو سمح)	BN (UMNO)	18,753; 70.30%
6th	P072	1982–1986	Sabbaruddin Chik (صبار الدين چئ)	BN (UMNO)	18,162; 53.49%
7th	P080	1986–1990ª	Sabbaruddin Chik (صبار الدين چئ)	BN (UMNO)	16,194; 58.44%
8th	P080	1990–1995	Sabbaruddin Chik (صبار الدين چئ)	BN (UMNO)	20,128; 56.72%
9th	P084	1995–1999	Sabbaruddin Chik (صبار الدين چئ)	BN (UMNO)	22,078; 61.17%
10th	P084	1999–2004	Mohd. Sarit Yusoh (محمد. ساريت يوسوه)	BN (UMNO)	19,379; 50.28%
11th	P088	2004–2008¹ ᵇ	Mohd. Sarit Yusoh (محمد. ساريت يوسوه)	BN (UMNO)	24,633; 67.19%
12th	P088	2008–2013	Saifuddin Abdullah (سيف الدين عبدالله)	BN (UMNO)	21,381; 53.03%
13th	P088	2013–2018	Nasrudin Hassan (نصرالدين حسن)	PR (PAS)	28,267; 50.96%
14th	P088	2018–2022	Mohd Anuar Mohd Tahir (محمد انوار بن محمد طاهر)	PH (AMANAH)	23,998; 39.31%
15th	P088	2022–present	Salamiah Mohd Nor (سلامايه محمد نوه)	PN (PAS)	30,929; 37.43%

Note: ^{1}Noted that in 2003 redelineation exercise this Temerloh constituency is now shifted north to Temerloh city centre from former Mentakab constituency, not Bera, Pahang in Bera District where now renamed as Bera. ª Temerloh was renamed to Temerluh, with most of its area retained. A minor portion was split off to form Mentekab in the 1986 redelineation. ᵇ Temerluh was renamed to Bera with most of its area retained. A minor portion was split off to form Temerloh. Temerloh formed primarily from Mentekab, with minor additions from Temerluh in the 2003 redelineation.

=== State constituency ===
Parliamentary constituency	State constituency						
Parliamentary constituency	1955–59*	1959–1974	1974–1986	1986–1995	1995–2004	2004–2018	2018–present
Temerloh			Bandar Temerloh				
Temerloh			Bera				
Temerloh		Chenor					
Temerloh					Guai		
Temerloh		Jenderak					
Temerloh		Kuala Semantan				Kuala Semantan	
Temerloh						Lanchang	
Temerloh			Mentekab			Mentakab	
Temerloh		Sanggang					
Temerloh				Semantan			
Temerloh				Teriang			
Temerloh		Triang					

=== Historical boundaries ===
State Constituency	Area					
State Constituency	1959	1974	1984	1994	2003	2018
Bandar Temerloh		Kampung Pangsenam; Kampung Paya Batu; Kampung Paya Kechik; Semantan; Temerloh				
Bera		FELDA Tementi; FELDA Rentam; Kerayong; Kuala Bera; Triang		FELDA Bukit Mendi; FELDA Tementi; FELDA Rentam; Kerayong; Triang		
Chenor	Bandar Tun Razak; Chenor; FELDA Kumai; FELDA Rentam; FELDA Jengka					
Guai				FELDA Mayam; FELDA Purun; Kampung Guai; Kuala Bera; Mengkarak		
Jenderak	Jenderak; Kampung Kuala Mai; Kampung Seboi; Kerdau; Kuala Krau					
Kuala Semantan	Kampung Pangsenam; Kampung Paya Batu; Kampung Paya Kechik; Semantan; Temerloh				Kampung Bukit Kelulut; Kampung Padang Lalang; Kampung Paya Batu; Songsang; Temerloh	Lubak Seberang; Sanggang; Semantan; Songsang; Temerloh
Lanchang					FELDA Bukit Damar; FELDA Lakum; Kampung Dala; Kuala Kawang; Lanchang	FELDA Bukit Damar; FELDA Lakum; Kampung Pangsenam; Kampung Paya Batu; Lanchang
Mentakab		Kampung Chatin; Kampung Lipat Kajang; Kampung Raja; Sanggang; Songsang			Kampung Chatin; Kampung Paya Kechik; Kampung Tualang Hilir; Mentakab; Sanggang	Kampung Chatin; Kampung Paya Kechik; Kampung Tualang Hilir; Mentakab; Temerloh Jaya
Sanggang	Kampung Bukit Lada; Kampung Lipat Kajang; Kampung Padang Lalang; Kampung Raja; Sanggang					
Semantan			Kampung Bukit Kelulut; Kampung Padang Lalang; Kampung Paya Batu; Songsang; Temerloh			
Triang	Bera; Guai; Kemayan; Mengkarak; Triang	FELDA Tembagau; FELDA Triang; FELDA Rentam; Guai; Mengkarak		FELDA Tembagau; FELDA Triang; FELDA Rentam; Kampung Pasal; Taman Jati		

=== Current state assembly members ===
No.	State Constituency	Member	Coalition (Party)
N30	Mentakab	Woo Chee Wan	PH (DAP)
N31	Lanchang	Hassan Omar	PN (PAS)
N32	Kuala Semantan	Hassanudin Salim	PN (PAS)

=== Local governments & postcodes ===
No.	State Constituency	Local Government	Postcode
N30	Mentakab	Temerloh Municipal Council	28000, 28010, 28020, 28030, 28040 Temerloh; 28330 Triang; 28400 Mentakab; 28500 Lanchang; 28800 Bentong
N31	Lanchang	Temerloh Municipal Council	28000, 28010, 28020, 28030, 28040 Temerloh; 28330 Triang; 28400 Mentakab; 28500 Lanchang; 28800 Bentong
N32	Kuala Semantan	Temerloh Municipal Council	28000, 28010, 28020, 28030, 28040 Temerloh; 28330 Triang; 28400 Mentakab; 28500 Lanchang; 28800 Bentong

== Election results ==
Malaysian general election, 2022
Party	Candidate	Votes	%	∆%
PN	Salamiah Mohd Nor	30,929	37.43	▲37.43
PH	Hasbie Muda	25,409	30.75	▼8.56
BN	Mohd Sharkar Shamsudin	25,191	30.48	▼5.71
GTA	Aminudin Yahya	1,108	1.34	▲1.34
Total valid votes		82,637	100.00	
Total rejected ballots		759		
Unreturned ballots		216		
Turnout		83,612	77.35	▼5.50
Registered electors		106,829		
Majority		5,520	6.68	▲3.56
PN gain from PH		Swing		?
Source(s) https://lom.agc.gov.my/ilims/upload/portal/akta/outputp/1753278/PUB611_2022.pdf

Malaysian general election, 2018
Party	Candidate	Votes	%	∆%
PKR	Mohd Anuar Mohd Tahir	23,998	39.31	▲39.31
BN	Mohd Sharkar Shamsudin	22,094	36.19	▼12.85
PAS	Md Jusoh Darus	14,734	24.13	▼26.83
Independent	Mohd Khaidir Ahmad	178	0.29	▲0.29
Independent	Muhamad Fakhrudin Abu Hanipah	46	0.08	▲0.08
Total valid votes		61,050	100.00	
Total rejected ballots		865		
Unreturned ballots		289		
Turnout		62,204	82.85	▼2.76
Registered electors		75,081		
Majority		1,904	3.12	▲1.20
PKR gain from PAS		Swing		?
Source(s) "His Majesty's Government Gazette - Notice of Contested Election, Parliament for the State of Pahang [P.U. (B) 238/2018]" (PDF). Attorney General's Chambers of Malaysia. 3 May 2018. "Federal Government Gazette - Results of Contested Election and Statements of the Poll after the Official Addition of Votes, Parliamentary Constituencies for the State of Pahang [P.U. (B) 312/2018]" (PDF). Attorney General's Chambers of Malaysia. 28 May 2018.

Malaysian general election, 2013
Party	Candidate	Votes	%	∆%
PAS	Nasrudin Hassan	28,267	50.96	▲50.96
BN	Saifuddin Abdullah	27,197	49.04	▼3.99
Total valid votes		55,464	100.00	
Total rejected ballots		977		
Unreturned ballots		154		
Turnout		56,595	85.61	▲8.84
Registered electors		66,105		
Majority		1,070	1.92	▼4.14
PAS gain from BN		Swing		?
Source(s) "Federal Government Gazette - Notice of Contested Election, Parliament for the State of Pahang [P.U. (B) 175/2013]" (PDF). Attorney General's Chambers of Malaysia. 26 April 2013. "Federal Government Gazette - Results of Contested Election and Statements of the Poll after the Official Addition of Votes, Parliamentary Constituencies for the State of Pahang [P.U. (B) 216/2013]" (PDF). Attorney General's Chambers of Malaysia. 22 May 2013. Archived from the original (PDF) on 2019-07-01.

Malaysian general election, 2008
Party	Candidate	Votes	%	∆%
BN	Saifuddin Abdullah	21,381	53.03	▼14.16
PKR	Ahmad Nizam Hamid	18,940	46.97	▲46.97
Total valid votes		40,321	100.00	
Total rejected ballots		924		
Unreturned ballots		218		
Turnout		41,463	76.77	▲1.66
Registered electors		54,010		
Majority		2,441	6.06	▼28.32
BN hold		Swing		

Malaysian general election, 2004
Party	Candidate	Votes	%	∆%
BN	Mohd. Sarit Yusoh	24,633	67.19	▲16.91
PAS	Idris Omar	12,026	32.81	▼16.91
Total valid votes		36,659	100.00	
Total rejected ballots		884		
Unreturned ballots		0		
Turnout		37,543	75.11	▲1.07
Registered electors		49,984		
Majority		12,607	34.38	▲33.82
BN hold		Swing		

Malaysian general election, 1999
Party	Candidate	Votes	%	∆%
BN	Mohd. Sarit Yusoh	19,379	50.28	▼10.89
PAS	Abdul Wahab Ismail	19,166	49.72	▲49.72
Total valid votes		38,545	100.00	
Total rejected ballots		915		
Unreturned ballots		292		
Turnout		39,752	74.04	▼2.66
Registered electors		53,689		
Majority		213	0.56	▼21.78
BN hold		Swing		

Malaysian general election, 1995
Party	Candidate	Votes	%	∆%
BN	Sabbaruddin Chik	22,078	61.17	▲4.45
S46	Tengku Azlan Sultan Abu Bakar	14,012	38.83	▼4.45
Total valid votes		36,090	100.00	
Total rejected ballots		1,448		
Unreturned ballots		1,896		
Turnout		39,434	76.70	▼0.31
Registered electors		51,413		
Majority		8,066	22.34	▲8.90
BN hold		Swing		

Malaysian general election, 1990
Party	Candidate	Votes	%	∆%
BN	Sabbaruddin Chik	20,128	56.72	▼1.72
S46	Kamarazman Yacob	15,358	43.28	▲43.28
Total valid votes		35,486	100.00	
Total rejected ballots		1,084		
Unreturned ballots		0		
Turnout		36,570	77.01	▲3.74
Registered electors		47,490		
Majority		4,770	13.44	▼3.44
BN hold		Swing		

Malaysian general election, 1986
Party	Candidate	Votes	%	∆%
BN	Sabbaruddin Chik	16,194	58.44	▲4.95
PAS	Suhaimi Said	11,515	41.56	▲21.28
Total valid votes		27,709	100.00	
Total rejected ballots		930		
Unreturned ballots				
Turnout		28,639	73.27	▼2.22
Registered electors		39,089		
Majority		4,779	16.88	▼10.38
BN hold		Swing		

Malaysian general election, 1982
Party	Candidate	Votes	%	∆%
BN	Sabbaruddin Chik	18,162	53.49	▼16.81
DAP	Lim Ong Hang	8,906	26.23	▲26.23
PAS	Ishak Abdullah	6,885	20.28	▼9.42
Total valid votes		33,953	100.00	
Total rejected ballots		1,443		
Unreturned ballots		0		
Turnout		35,396	75.49	▼0.37
Registered electors		46,891		
Majority		9,256	27.26	▼13.34
BN hold		Swing		

Malaysian general election, 1978
Party	Candidate	Votes	%	∆%
BN	Hamzah Abu Samah	18,753	70.30	▼5.26
PAS	Ahmad Sulaiman	7,922	29.70	▲29.70
Total valid votes		26,675	100.00	
Total rejected ballots		1,969		
Unreturned ballots		0		
Turnout		28,644	75.86	▲2.00
Registered electors		37,758		
Majority		10,831	40.60	▼10.43
BN hold		Swing		

Malaysian general election, 1974
Party	Candidate	Votes	%	∆%
BN	Hamzah Abu Samah	14,251	75.56	▲20.30
Parti Rakyat Malaysia	Kamarulzaman Teh	4,609	24.44	▲24.44
Total valid votes		18,860	100.00	
Total rejected ballots		1,440		
Unreturned ballots		0		
Turnout		20,300	73.86	▲2.28
Registered electors		28,790		
Majority		9,624	51.03	▲21.16
BN gain from Alliance		Swing		?

Malaysian general election, 1969
Party	Candidate	Votes	%	∆%
Alliance	Mohamed Yusof Mahmud	12,206	55.26	▼6.24
PMIP	Mohamed Din Sandang	5,608	25.39	▲8.66
Parti Rakyat Malaysia	Satar Dahan	4,273	19.35	▲19.35
Total valid votes		22,087	100.00	
Total rejected ballots		1,581		
Unreturned ballots		0		
Turnout		23,668	71.58	▼6.62
Registered electors		33,066		
Majority		6,598	29.87	▼9.87
Alliance hold		Swing		

Malaysian general election, 1964
Party	Candidate	Votes	%	∆%
Alliance	Mohamed Yusof Mahmud	12,311	61.50	▲6.89
Socialist Front	Ja'afar Hussin	4,357	21.77	▼23.62
PMIP	Abu Samah Ali	3,350	16.73	▲16.73
Total valid votes		20,018	100.00	
Total rejected ballots		1,017		
Unreturned ballots		0		
Turnout		21,035	78.20	▲6.73
Registered electors		26,899		
Majority		7,954	39.73	▲30.51
Alliance hold		Swing		

Malayan general election, 1959
Party	Candidate	Votes	%
Alliance	Mohamed Yusof Mahmud	8,018	54.61
Socialist Front	Ishak Muhammad	6,665	45.39
Total valid votes		14,683	100.00
Total rejected ballots		125	
Unreturned ballots		0	
Turnout		14,808	71.47
Registered electors		20,718	
Majority		1,353	9.22
This was a new constituency created.
