= Mohd Anuar Mohd Tahir =

Malaysian politician

Yang Berbahagia Datuk Wira Mohd Anuar Mohd Tahir DCSM
- محمد انوار بن محمد طاهر
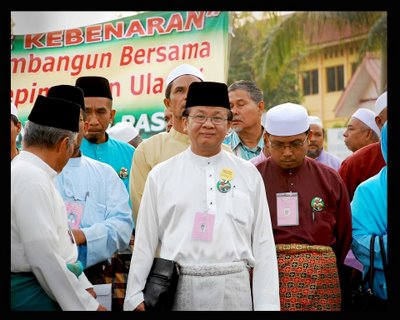

Deputy Minister of Works
- In office 2 July 2018 – 24 February 2020
- Monarchs: Muhammad V (2018–2019); Abdullah (2019–2020)
- Prime Minister: Mahathir Mohamad
- Minister: Baru Bian
- Preceded by: Rosnah Shirlin
- Succeeded by: Shahruddin Md Salleh
- Constituency: Temerloh

1st Secretary-General of the National Trust Party
- In office 16 September 2015 – 11 December 2019
- President: Mohamad Sabu
- Preceded by: Position established
- Succeeded by: Mohd Hatta Ramli

Member of the Malaysian Parliament for Temerloh
- In office 9 May 2018 – 19 November 2022
- Preceded by: Nasrudin Hassan (PR–PAS)
- Succeeded by: Salamiah Mohd Nor (PN–PAS)
- Majority: 1,904 (2018)

Faction represented in Dewan Rakyat
- 2018–2022: Pakatan Harapan

Personal details
- Born: Mohd Anuar bin Mohd Tahir; 1952 (age 73–74) Beseri, Perlis, Federation of Malaya (now Malaysia).
- Citizenship: Malaysian
- Party: United Malays National Organisation (UMNO) (–1998); People's Justice Party (PKR) (1999–2003); Malaysian Islamic Party (PAS) (2003–2015); National Trust Party (AMANAH) (since 2015)
- Other political affiliations: Barisan Nasional (BN) (–1998); Barisan Alternatif (BA) (1999–2004); Pakatan Rakyat (PR) (2008–2015); Pakatan Harapan (PH) (since 2015)
- Education: MARA Institute of Technology; Morehead State University
- Occupation: Politician
- Website: Official website

Mohd Anuar bin Mohd Tahir (Jawi: محمد انوار بن محمد طاهر) is a Malaysian politician who served as Deputy Minister of Works in the Pakatan Harapan (PH) administration under former Prime Minister Mahathir Mohamad and former Minister Baru Bian from July 2018 to the collapse of the PH administration in February 2020 and Member of Parliament (MP) for Temerloh from May 2018 to November 2022. He is a member of the National Trust Party (AMANAH), a component party of the PH coalition and was a member of the Malaysian Islamic Party (PAS), then component party of the Pakatan Rakyat (PR) coalition, the People's Justice Party (PKR), then component party of the Barisan Alternatif (BA) coalition as well as the United Malays National Organisation (UMNO), a component party of the Barisan Nasional (BN) coalition. He also served as the 1st and founding Secretary-General of AMANAH from September 2015 to December 2019.

== Educations ==
Mohd Anuar was born in 1952 at Beseri, Perlis, and received his early education at Sekolah Kebangsaan (SK) Beseri. He studied and graduated his bachelor's degree in Business Administration at MARA Institute of Technology (ITM). He later obtained his master's degree in Sociology at Morehead State University, United States (1985–1986).

During his time as a student at ITM, Mohd Anuar started involving in youth Non-governmental organizations (NGO) like Muslim Youth Movement of Malaysia (ABIM) and others.

== Politics ==
Mohd Anuar was a United Malays National Organisation (UMNO) before quits following dismissal of Anwar Ibrahim from the party in 1998. He was then appointed as the first secretary general of People's Justice Party (KeADILan) in 1999, but somehow he shifted by joining Pan-Malaysian Islamic Party (PAS) in 2003 and was selected as a Central Working Committee member of PAS.

However Mohd Anuar was one of the moderate and progressive PAS leaders referred to as G18 who were ousted at the 2015 PAS leadership election that led them to launch the new splinter party, AMANAH with Mohd Anuar as its first secretary general.

== Elections ==
Mohd Anuar made his debut contesting in the 1999 general election as a KeADILan candidate the parliamentary seat of Padang Besar, Perlis. He also contested before the Perlis State Legislative Assembly seats of Beseri in the 2004 general election, Bintong in the 2008 general election and Santan in the 2013 general election representing PAS. But he lost in all his attempts until he contested and won in the 2018 general election the parliamentary seat of Temerloh in Pahang as an AMANAH candidate.

== Election results ==
Perlis State Legislative Assembly
| Year | Constituency | Candidate | Votes | Pct | Opponent(s) | Votes | Pct | Ballots cast | Majority | Turnout |
|---|---|---|---|---|---|---|---|---|---|---|
| 2004 | N02 Beseri | Mohd Anuar Mohd Tahir (PAS) | 1,621 | 31.04% | Zahidi Zainul Abidin (UMNO) | 3,492 | 66.87% | 5,222 | 1,871 | 78.59% |
| 2008 | N06 Bintong | Mohd Anuar Mohd Tahir (PAS) | 2,772 | 36.22% | Md Isa Sabu (UMNO) | 4,882 | 63.78% | 7,864 | 2,110 | 83.78% |
| 2013 | N05 Santan | Mohd Anuar Mohd Tahir (PAS) | 3,125 | 42.61% | Sabry Ahmad (UMNO) | 4,209 | 57.39% | 7,449 | 1,084 | 88.63% |

Parliament of Malaysia
| Year | Constituency | Candidate | Votes | Pct | Opponent(s) | Votes | Pct | Ballots cast | Majority | Turnout |
|---|---|---|---|---|---|---|---|---|---|---|
| 1999 | P001 Padang Besar | Mohd Anuar Mohd Tahir (KeADILan) | 9,867 | 40.68% | Azmi Khalid (UMNO) | 14,386 | 59.32% | 25,347 | 4,519 | 78.04% |
| 2018 | P088 Temerloh | Mohd Anuar Mohd Tahir (AMANAH) | 23,998 | 39.31% | Mohd Sharkar Shamsudin (UMNO) | 22,094 | 36.19% | 62,204 | 1,904 | 82.85% |
| 2018 | P088 Temerloh | Mohd Anuar Mohd Tahir (AMANAH) | 23,998 | 39.31% | Md Jusoh Darus (PAS) | 14,734 | 24.13% | 62,204 | 1,904 | 82.85% |
| 2018 | P088 Temerloh | Mohd Anuar Mohd Tahir (AMANAH) | 23,998 | 39.31% | Mohd Khaidir Ahmad (IND) | 178 | 0.29% | 62,204 | 1,904 | 82.85% |
| 2018 | P088 Temerloh | Mohd Anuar Mohd Tahir (AMANAH) | 23,998 | 39.31% | Muhd Fakhrudin Abu Hanipah (IND) | 46 | 0.08% | 62,204 | 1,904 | 82.85% |

== Honours ==
- Malacca
  - Knight Commander of the Exalted Order of Malacca (DCSM) – Datuk Wira (2019)

== See also ==
Seventh Mahathir cabinet
