= MATRI Perlis =

Ma'had atTarbiyah alIslamiyah (MATRI)
- Beseri, Perlis, Malaysia

Information
- Type: Private boarding school
- Motto: Ulama' Warasatul Anbiya
- Founded: 20 August 1987
- Principal: Ustaz Omar Haji Salleh

Ma’had atTarbiyah al-Islamiyah, commonly known as MATRI is the only private religious school in Perlis. Founded in 1987 by the late Dato' Kaya Bakti Ustaz Dahlan Mohd. Zain, MATRI celebrated its two decades of existence in May 2008 with the visit of over 10,000 visitors from all over Malaysia.

MATRI is located in Tunjung Village, Beseri, Perlis in Malaysia. Situated nearby a rubber plantation, MATRI is surrounded by greenery, with mountains as a background. This 16.2-hectare-school is accessible by road 14 kilometres from Kangar, the capital of Perlis. In 2008 there were 817 students in 34 classes.
