= Kambiz Atabay =

Iranian football administrator (1939–2025)

- كامبيز آتابای
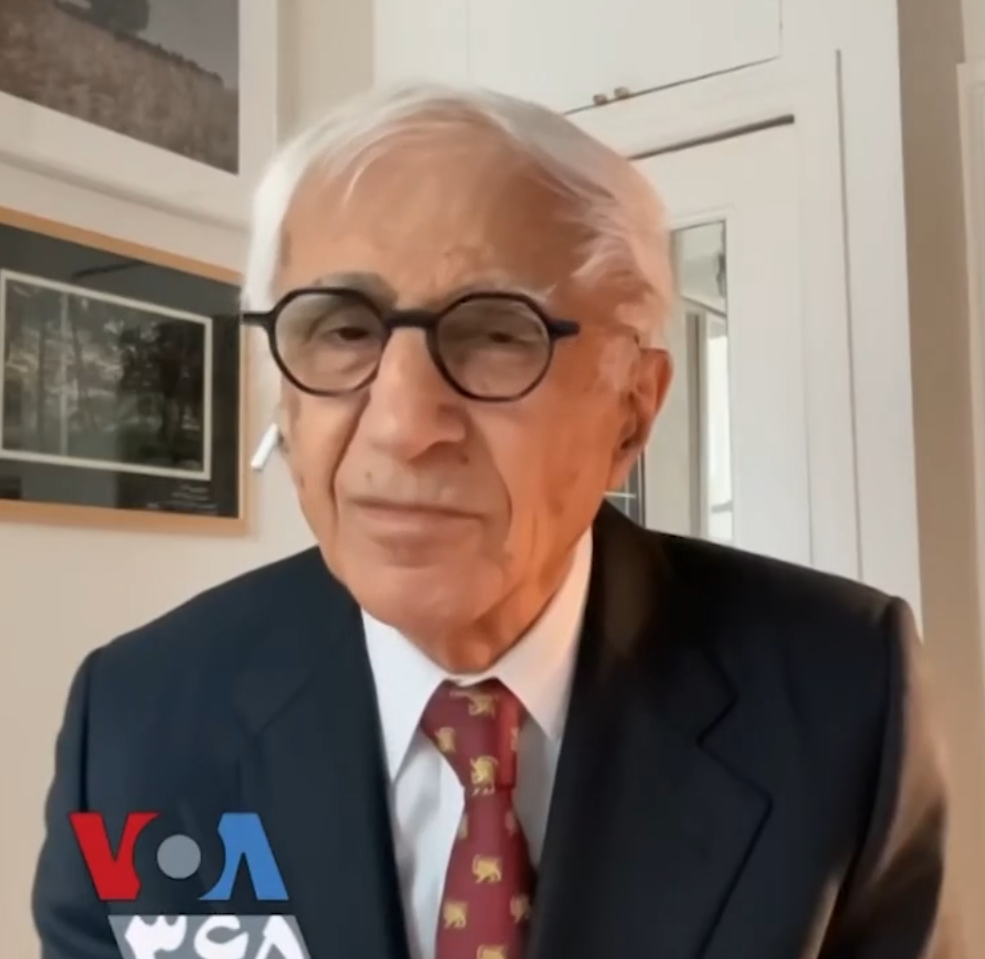
- Atabay in 2023

6th President of AFC
- In office 1 August 1976 – 9 December 1978
- Preceded by: Tunku Abdul Rahman
- Succeeded by: Hamzah Abu Samah

President of FFI
- In office 17 October 1972 – 17 February 1979
- Preceded by: Mostafa Mokri
- Succeeded by: Naser Noamooz

Personal details
- Born: 2 February 1939 Tehran, Iran
- Died: 3 November 2025 (aged 86)

Kambiz Atabay (Persian: كامبيز آتابای; 2 February 1939 – 3 November 2025) was an Iranian football administrator who served as the private secretary to Her Majesty Farah Pahlavi's office in New York. He was also an athlete and administrator who was President of the Asian Football Confederation from 1 August 1976 until his resignation on 9 December 1978. Atabay was also President of Football Federation of Iran from 17 October 1972 to 17 February 1979. He died on 3 November 2025, at the age of 86.

Civic offices
Preceded by Mostafa Makri	President of Football Federation of Iran; 1972–1979	Succeeded by Naser Noamooz
Preceded by Tunku Abdul Rahman	President of Asian Football Confederation; 1976–1978	Succeeded by Hamzah Abu Samah
