= Hamed Momeni =

Iranian football administrator (born 1987)

General Secretary of FFIRI Acting
- Incumbent
- Assumed office 31 August 2026
- President: Mehdi Taj
- Preceded by: Hedayat Mombeyni

Personal details
- Born: Hamed Momeni Rochi; 1985 (age 40–41) Tehran, Iran
- Occupation: Football administrator

Hamed Momeni (Persian: حامد مومنی, born 1985 in Tehran) is an Iranian football administrator and acting general secretary of Football Federation Islamic Republic of Iran since August 2026.

He also acts as the deputy general secretary of Iran Football Federation, meanwhile works as a FIFA and the AFC match commissioner. Momeni was the only Iranian who has appointed as a match director in the Paris 2024 Olympic games.

Momeni writes for FourFourTwo magazine.

== Complaint with the AIFF ==
In 2024, the All India Football Federation (AIFF) lodged a complaint with Hamed Momeni, seeking a probe into the controversial goal awarded to Qatar in their crucial World Cup qualifying match in Doha. He was the match commissioner for that game in June 2024.
