= Mohammad Mir =

Television presenter

- Born: 14 May 1984 (age 42); Darreh Shahr, Iran
- Occupation: Television presenter
- Years active: 2003–present
- Known for: Shabhaye Footballi Presenter

Mohammad Mir (Persian: محمد میر; born 26 December 1982 in Tehran, Iran) is a presenter of sports programs in IRIB.

== Professional life ==
Mohammad Mir began his career as a Sports commentator with Radio Tehran from the beginning of his entry into the organization of the Islamic Republic of Iran Broadcasting in 2008.

== Margins ==
- Rumors about her closeness and relationship with former football federation chief Shahaboddin Azizi Khadem were topics of discussion and criticism in the virtual space.

== Records ==
- Persian Gulf Pro League draw ceremony.
- Reporter sent to the 2020 Summer Olympics.
- Reporter sent to the 2022 Asian Games.
- Reporter sent to the 2022 FIFA World Cup in Qatar.
- Reporter sent to the 2023 AFC Asian Cup in Qatar.
- Reporter sent to the 2023 AFC Champions League.

== Programs ==
Year	Program name	Work	Channel	References
2008	Tehran Varzeshi	commentator	Radio Tehran	
2017–present	Shabhaye Footballi	Presenter	IRIB Varzesh	
2016–present	Nowruz Footballi	Presenter	IRIB Varzesh	
