= Abbas Torabian =

Iranian football team manager (born 1952)

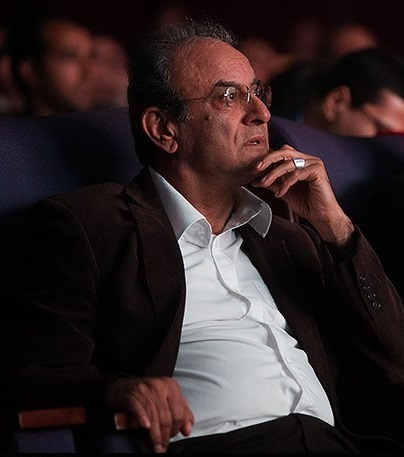
- Born: Abbas Ali Torabian; 12 January 1952 (age 74); Tehran, Iran
- Education: University of Tehran
- Occupation: Football administrator
- Title: Head of Iran's Futsal committee

Abbas Torabian (عباس ترابیان, born 12 January 1952, Tehran, Iran) is the former team manager of Iran national football team and the current head of futsal committee in Islamic Republic of Iran Football Federation. He was deputy chairman of the Esteghlal FC from 1998 to 2008, and was appointed as head of the futsal committee by Ali Kafashian in November 2008. He became team manager and director of Iran national football team in April 2011 after his successful talks with Carlos Queiroz to become head coach of the national team but resigned in November 2011 to continue his career at the futsal committee. He was an employee in the Ministry of Petroleum before starting football careers.

== Suspension ==
In June 2019, Abbas Torabian and Ali Kafashian were suspended by the Iranian Football Federation's Ethic Committee for financial corruption.
