= Mahdi Mohammadnabi =

Iranian football administrator (born 1962)

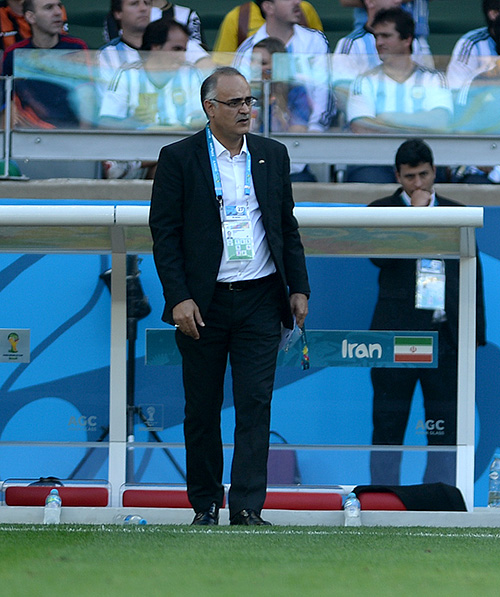
- Born: 1962 (age 63–64); Tehran, Iran
- Occupation: Football administrator

Mahdi Mohammadnabi (born in 1962 in Tehran) is an Iranian football administrator and is currently First Vice President of Football Federation Islamic Republic of Iran since 2022.

He served as the General Secretary of the Islamic Republic of Iran Football Federation in two terms, from 2006 to 2014 and from 2020 to 2021. He is also a former member of the Asian Football Confederation marketing committee, and former vice president of Persepolis F.C.

In April 2020, Mohammadnabi appointed as the new General Secretary of the Iranian Football Federation and served in this position until March 2021.
