= Mehdi Taj =

Sport administrator of Iran

- مهدی تاج
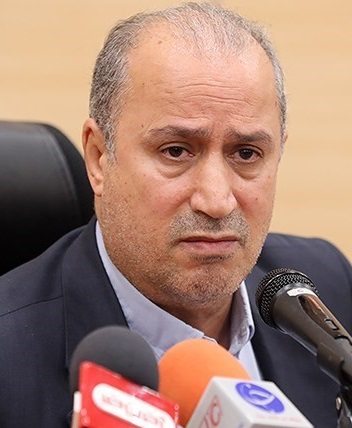
- Taj in 2019

President of Football Federation Islamic Republic of Iran
- Incumbent
- Assumed office 30 August 2022
- Preceded by: Mirshad Majedi (acting)
- In office 7 May 2016 – 29 December 2019
- Preceded by: Ali Kafashian
- Succeeded by: Heydar Baharvand (acting)

President of Iran Football League Organization
- In office 28 October 2013 – 7 May 2016; Acting: 14 January – 28 October 2013
- Preceded by: Gholamreza Behravan
- Succeeded by: Ali Kazemi (acting)

Personal details
- Born: January 20, 1960 (age 66) Isfahan, Iran
- Education: University of Isfahan

Mehdi Taj (Persian: مهدی تاج) is an Iranian sports executive who has served as the president of Football Federation Islamic Republic of Iran (FFIRI) since August 2022, serving his second and third terms. Since 2019, he has also served as one of five vice presidents of the Asian Football Confederation (AFC). He has a history of serving in the Islamic Revolutionary Guard Corps (IRGC).

His first term as president of FFIRI was from 2016 until 2019. In May 2020, he was appointed a member of the AFC Emergency Committee.

He was previously First Vice President of FFIRI (2008–2012), President of the Iran Football League Organization (2013–2016), Secretary of the Board of Sepahan (1992–1994, 2002–2006) and president of the club (1994–1999), and Board Chairman of the Foolad Metil. He was also editor-in-chief of Jahan Varzesh from 1991 until 2001. On 7 May 2016, he was elected as president of FFIRI with 51 votes, succeeding Ali Kafashian. He resigned in December 2019 due to heart problems.

On 30 August 2022, Taj was elected as new president of FFIRI for a two-year term. Taj won the three-candidate race with 51 votes.

In April 2026, Taj was turned away by Canadian authorities while en route to the 2026 FIFA Congress in Vancouver due to his ties to the IRGC.

== Women's football in Iran ==
Taj has visited the training camp of the Iranian women's national football team. He also said that all Iranian clubs should try to start a women's section. However, in the economic sector, the serious problems of Iranian women's football remained as before.

Taj watched the 2023 Women's World Cup final.
