= Sabbaruddin Chik =

Malaysian politician (1941–2021)

Yang Berbahagia Tan Sri Sabbaruddin Chik PSM SSAP SIMP DPMS DSAP SMS
- صبار الدين چئ

Minister of Culture, Arts and Tourism
- In office 20 May 1987 – 12 November 1996
- Monarchs: Iskandar; Azlan Shah; Ja'afar
- Prime Minister: Mahathir Mohamad
- Deputy: Ng Cheng Kuai; Chan Kong Choy; Teng Gaik Kwan
- Preceded by: Najib Razak as Minister of Culture, Youth and Sports
- Succeeded by: Abdul Kadir Sheikh Fadzir
- Constituency: Temerloh

Member of the Malaysian Parliament for Temerloh
- In office 1982–1999
- Preceded by: Hamzah Abu Samah (BN–UMNO)
- Succeeded by: Mohd Sarit Yusoh (BN–UMNO)

Personal details
- Born: 13 December 1941 Temerloh, Pahang, Japanese occupation of British Malaya (now Malaysia)
- Died: 4 December 2021 (aged 79) Kuala Lumpur, Malaysia
- Resting place: Bukit Kiara Muslim Cemetery, Kuala Lumpur
- Citizenship: Malaysian
- Party: United Malays National Organisation (UMNO)
- Other political affiliations: Barisan Nasional (BN)
- Spouse: Faridah Mohamed (d. 2017)
- Education: University of Malaya
- Occupation: Politician

Sabbaruddin bin Chik (Jawi: صبار الدين بن چئ; 13 December 1941 – 4 December 2021) was a Malaysian politician who served as Minister of Culture, Arts and Tourism from 1987 to 1996.

== Education ==
Chik graduated with a BA (Hons) from the University of Malaya in 1966 and subsequently obtained his master's degree in Public Administration from the Institute of Social Studies, in the Netherlands in 1974.

== Career ==
=== Public service ===
Chik served as the Assistant State Secretary of Negeri Sembilan in 1966. A year later, he was appointed the Assistant Secretary for the Ministry of Foreign Affairs. Then, he was promoted as Second Secretary at the Malaysian Embassy in Saigon, Vietnam. He was then appointed the Charge d'affaires of the Embassy (1969–1971).

He then rose to various positions in the public services, including as the Principal Assistant Secretary at the Prime Minister's Department, Director of Socio-Economic Planning Unit in the Prime Minister's Department and Director of International Trade, Ministry of Trade and Industry from 1971 to 1979.

Finally, he served as the Deputy State Secretary for the Government of Selangor from 1980 to 1981.

=== Politics ===
Chik began his political career when he contested the Temerloh parliamentary seats and holding the seat from 1982 to 1999. He was then made the Deputy Finance Minister in 1982 to 1987 under Tun Dr. Mahathir Mohamad cabinet. He was then appointed Minister of Culture, Arts and Tourism from 1987 to 1996.

== Retirement ==
Chik was the chairman in various companies such as Amanah Raya Berhad, Bank Kerjasama Rakyat Malaysia Berhad, Priceworth International Berhad, Eden Inc. Berhad (also known as Eden Enterprises (M) Bhd), Pernas Trading Sdn Bhd, Malaysian Electronic Payment System Sdn Bhd, Nudex Ventures Sdn. Bhd and IPTB Sdn Bhd.

== Death ==
Chik died from COVID-19 at University Malaya Medical Centre in Kuala Lumpur on 4 December 2021, aged 79, during the COVID-19 pandemic in Malaysia. He was buried at the Bukit Kiara Muslim Cemetery in Kuala Lumpur.

== Election results ==
Parliament of Malaysia
Year	Constituency	Candidate	Votes	Pct	Opponent(s)	Votes	Pct	Ballots cast	Majority	Turnout
1982	P072 Temerloh	Sabbaruddin Chik (UMNO)	18,162	53.49%	Lim Ong Hang (DAP)	8,906	26.23%	35,396	9,256	75.49%
1982	P072 Temerloh	Sabbaruddin Chik (UMNO)	18,162	53.49%	Ishak Abdullah (PAS)	6,885	20.28%	35,396	9,256	75.49%
1986	P080 Temerloh	Sabbaruddin Chik (UMNO)	16,194	58.44%	Suhaimi Said (PAS)	11,515	41.56%	28,639	4,779	73.27%
1990	P080 Temerloh	Sabbaruddin Chik (UMNO)	20,128	56.72%	Kamarazman Yacob (S46)	15,358	43.28%	36,570	4,770	77.01%
1995	P084 Temerloh	Sabbaruddin Chik (UMNO)	22,078	61.17%	Tengku Azlan Sultan Abu Bakar (S46)	14,012	38.83%	39,434	8,066	76.70%

== Honours ==
=== Honours of Malaysia ===
- Malaysia
  - Commander of the Order of Loyalty to the Crown of Malaysia (PSM) – Tan Sri (2000)
- Pahang
  - Grand Knight of the Order of Sultan Ahmad Shah of Pahang (SSAP) – Dato' Sri (1998)
  - Grand Knight of the Order of the Crown of Pahang (SIMP) – Dato', later Dato' Indera (1988)
  - Knight Companion of the Order of Sultan Ahmad Shah of Pahang (DSAP) – Dato' (1982)
- Selangor
  - Knight Commander of the Order of the Crown of Selangor (DPMS) – Dato' (1992)
  - Companion of the Order of the Crown of Selangor (SMS) (1982)

== See also ==
- List of deaths due to COVID-19 - notable individual deaths
