= Shabhaye Footballi =

Iranian football television program

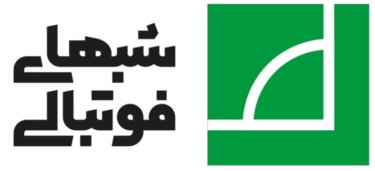
- Genre: Iran Football
- Presented by: Current: Mohammad Mir (2019–); Mehdi Tutunchi (2021–) Former: Abdullah Rava (2015–2016); Rasoul Majidi (2016–2017); Mehdi Vaezi (2017) (2017–2018); Shahab Ghasemi (2018–2019)
- Country of origin: Iran
- Original language: Persian
- No. of seasons: 9

Production
- Camera setup: 16:9
- Running time: 120–140 minutes
- Production company: IRIB Varzesh

Original release
- Network: IRIB Varzesh
- Release: 15 September 2015 – present

Shabhaye Footballi (Persian: شب‌های فوتبالی, transl. Football Nights) is an Iranian football television program, which is broadcast every week after the Persian Gulf Pro League matches on IRIB Varzesh. The program, produced by Arash Mousaei and performed by Mohammad Mir and Mehdi Tutunci, examines the events and margins surrounding Iranian football. This program covers the Persian Gulf Pro League, Iranian Hazfi Cup, Iranian Super Cup, Iranian teams in the AFC Champions League and Iran national football team.

Shabhaye Footballi, with the help of experts from Tehran and different cities, discuss the football matches of the day and discuss the results of different matches and topics from the perspective of experts, coaches and sports writers. In this program, the press conference of most of the matches will be broadcast live. Checking the margins of Pro League matches with the presence of special guests, including football experts, officials, players and coaches, will be presented to the audience in the form of an image as soon as possible after the final whistle. Referee analysis of Pro League matches will be one of the interesting items of this program. This program is also known as one of the Navad alternative programs. Before the closure of Navad, this program was also mentioned as a competitor of Navad.

== Background ==
The first program of Shabhaye Footballi was aired on the IRIB Varzesh on 15 September 2015, and since then, football audiences can watch excerpts of Pro League matches along with technical expertise and refereeing in the presence of experienced experts from the IRIB Varzesh.

== Attributes ==
=== Broadcast ===
This program is broadcast every week after the matches of the Persian Gulf Pro League on IRIB Varzesh.

=== Performance ===
The hosts of this program are Mohammad Mir and Mehdi Tutunchi . Previously, Abdullah Rava, Rasoul Majidi, Mehdi Vaezi, Mohammad Derakhshandeh and Shahab Ghasemi were in charge of implementing this program, and Afshin Abdullahian was a former expert in the program.

== Theme ==
=== Program process ===
Shabhaye Footballi in each episode reviews and analyzes events related to Iranian football. Typically, this program broadcasts scenes from the Persian Gulf Pro League matches, the Iranian Hazfi Cup, the analysis of refereeing issues in the presence of refereeing experts, and the examination of the margins of Iranian football.

=== Program sections ===
- Broadcast match summaries:

In this section, important scenes of the matches are broadcast along with interviews with players and coaches.

- Arbitration expert:

In this program, refereeing experts comment on the matches every week.

- Guest:

In each part of the program, coaches, players and club managers are invited to the program and sit down with the presenters to discuss various issues.

- Items:

Every week in this section, items from Iranian football teams, players and coaches are broadcast.

- Editorial:

In this section, interesting news, pictures and videos of Iranian football are discussed.

- Technical analysis:

In this section, important or special matches are analyzed every week (from a technical or quality point of view) by a multiplayer team, and the product is broadcast with pictures related to the game.

- Thematic documentaries:

In this program, short documentaries will be broadcast according to the events of the last week (or the future). Usually, these documentaries cover not only football but also social and cultural issues.

- Special file:

This section talks about special events in Iranian football.

- Pre-match:

In this section, a review of the conditions of the teams organizing the important game next week in the previous weeks, a statistical review with a historical perspective is done.

== See also ==
- Navad
- Football Bartar
