= Ishak Muhamad =

Malaysian politician

Yang Berhormat Dato' Sri Ishak Muhamad SSAP SIMP DSAP DIMP
- إسحاق بن محمد

Speaker of the Pahang State Legislative Assembly
- In office 1 July 2013 – 29 December 2022
- Monarchs: Ahmad Shah (2013–2019); Abdullah (2019–2022)
- Deputy: Mohamed Jaafar
- Menteri Besar: Adnan Yaakob (2013–2018); Wan Rosdy Wan Ismail (2018–2022)
- Preceded by: Wan Mohd Razali Wan Mahussin
- Succeeded by: Mohd Sharkar Shamsudin
- Constituency: Non-MLA

Exco roles (Pahang)
- 1999–2004: Chairman of the Education, Multimedia and Housing
- 2004–2008: Chairman of the Health, Community Welfare and Orang Asli Affairs
- 2008: Chairman of the Entrepreneur Development, Co-operatives, Human Resources and Consumer Affairs
- 2008–2013: Chairman of the Entrepreneur Development, and Co-operatives

Faction represented in Pahang State Legislative Assembly
- 1995–2013: Barisan Nasional

Personal details
- Born: 7 September 1952 (age 73) Pahang, Malaysia
- Citizenship: Malaysian
- Party: United Malays National Organisation (UMNO)
- Other political affiliations: Barisan Nasional (BN)
- Occupation: Politician

Ishak bin Haji Muhamad is a Malaysian politician who served as Speaker of the Pahang State Legislative Assembly from July 2013 to December 2022, Member of the Pahang State Executive Council (EXCO) from December 1999 and Member of the Pahang State Legislative Assembly (MLA) for Bebar from April 1995 to May 2013. He is a member of the United Malays National Organisation (UMNO), a component party of the Barisan Nasional (BN) coalition.

== Election results ==
Pahang State Legislative Assembly
Year	Constituency	Candidate	Votes	Pct	Opponent(s)	Votes	Pct	Ballots cast	Majority	Turnout
1995	N19 Bebar	Ishak Muhamad (UMNO)	5,066	69.96%	Ab. Wahab Jaapar (S46)	2,175	30.04%	7,598	2,891	72.27%
1999	N19 Bebar	Ishak Muhamad (UMNO)	4,442	55.13%	Abu Kassim Abdul Ghani (PAS)	3,615	44.87%	8,386	827	74.86%
2004	N22 Bebar	Ishak Muhamad (UMNO)	5,004	74.01%	Abu Kassim Manaf @ Abd Ghani (PAS)	1,757	25.99%	7,011	3,247	77.01%
2008	N22 Bebar	Ishak Muhamad (UMNO)	5,467	73.94%	Ahiatudin Daud (PAS)	1,927	26.06%	7,738	3,540	80.07%

== Honours ==
- Pahang
  - Knight Companion of the Order of the Crown of Pahang (DIMP) – Dato' (2000)
  - Knight Companion of the Order of Sultan Ahmad Shah of Pahang (DSAP) – Dato' (2007)
  - Grand Knight of the Order of the Crown of Pahang (SIMP) – Dato' Indera (2012)
  - Grand Knight of the Order of Sultan Ahmad Shah of Pahang (SSAP) – Dato' Sri (2014)
