= Kamarulzaman Teh =

Kamarulzaman Teh (15 January 1920 – 5 November 2002), who was imprisoned in the Federation of Malaya for 22 years, is the longest political detainee in Malaysia's history. He was the leader of Angkatan Pemuda Insaf (API), who fought the Japanese during the Japanese occupation of Malaya.

== Early life ==
Kamarulzaman was born into a family of Malay farmers in Temerloh, Pahang. He joined Parti Kebangsaan Melayu Malaya (PKMM) during the Japanese occupation in Malaya to fight against the Japanese army. He was very enthusiastic about the party as he saw socialism as a way to conquer poverty in his state through taxation of landowners. He was also attracted to guerrilla warfare, which he thought of as the most effective way to counter the Imperial Japanese army. Ultimately, he was elected as the head of the youth wing in Angkatan Pemuda Insaf (API) of Pahang.

== Incarceration and Charge ==
During the Malayan Emergency in 1948, the British took Kamarulzaman into custody in a bus station in Temerloh, without further investigation. He was also charged with owning firearms. He was sentenced to death by hanging, but was later granted a royal pardon from the Sultan of Pahang. His charge was reduced to life imprisonment instead. He spent the following 14 years in the prison at Temerloh. Following the departure of the British, he was released, but placed under surveillance. However, his freedom was short-lived, as he was arrested and detained under the Internal Security Act for another eight years.

== Release from prison ==
Following his release, Kamarulzaman joined Parti Sosialis Rakyat Malaysia (now Parti Rakyat Malaysia) and campaigned unsuccessfully for the Temerloh parliamentary seat in 1974. Even with his loss, he remained actively involved in PSRM throughout the 1970s and served on its central committee from 1981 to 1989.

== Health ==
Kamarulzaman's health slowly deteriorated. Because his family had difficulties paying his medical bills, he was taken care of by his adopted sister and her husband. He was put in a home for the elderly in Kuala Lumpur. His health worsened in July 2002, and he was moved from Kuala Lumpur back to his hometown in Temerloh.

== Reunion and death ==
After returning to Temerloh, he went to southern Thailand to reunite with his old comrades. His friends included General Secretary of the Communist Party of Malaya, Abdullah CD and Chin Peng. He also reunited with his friend Rashid Maidin when Rashid visited him in the nursing home. At that time, he was immobile and no longer able to recognise people due to his severe health problems. He died in Thailand at 10:30 am on 5 November 2002. He was buried in the Muslim graveyard at Narathiwat Province that same day.

== Election results ==
Parliament of Malaysia
Year	Constituency	Candidate	Votes	Pct	Opponent(s)	Votes	Pct	Ballots cast	Majority	Turnout
1974	P072 Temerloh	Kamarulzaman Teh (PSRM)	4,609	24.44%	Hamzah Abu Samah (UMNO)	14,251	75.56%	20,300	9,624	73.86%
