= Salamiah Mohd Nor =

Malaysian politician

Yang Berhormat Puan Hajah Salamiah Mohd Nor MP
- سلامية محمد نور

Member of the Malaysian Parliament for Temerloh
- Incumbent
- Assumed office 19 November 2022
- Preceded by: Mohd Anuar Mohd Tahir (PH–AMANAH)
- Majority: 5,520 (2022)

Personal details
- Born: Salamiah binti Mohd Nor; 21 August 1964 (age 62) Rawang, Selangor, Malaysia
- Citizenship: Malaysian
- Party: Malaysian Islamic Party (PAS)
- Other political affiliations: Perikatan Nasional (PN)

Salamiah binti Mohd Nor (born 21 August 1964) is a Malaysian politician who has served as the Member of Parliament (MP) for Temerloh since November 2022 after winning GE15. She is a member of the Malaysian Islamic Party (PAS), a component party of the Perikatan Nasional (PN) coalition.

== Election results ==
Parliament of Malaysia
Year	Constituency	Candidate	Votes	Pct	Opponent(s)	Votes	Pct	Ballots cast	Majority	Turnout
2022	P088 Temerloh	Salamiah Mohd Nor (PAS)	30,929	37.43%	Mohd Hasbie Muda (AMANAH)	25,409	30.75%	83,612	5,520	77.35%
2022	P088 Temerloh	Salamiah Mohd Nor (PAS)	30,929	37.43%	Mohd Sharkar Shamsudin (UMNO)	25,191	30.48%	83,612	5,520	77.35%
2022	P088 Temerloh	Salamiah Mohd Nor (PAS)	30,929	37.43%	Aminudin Yahaya (PEJUANG)	1,108	1.34%	83,612	5,520	77.35%

== Honours ==
=== Honours of Malaysia ===
- Malaysia
  - Recipient of the 17th Yang di-Pertuan Agong Installation Medal (2024)
