= Mohammad Dadkan =

Iranian footballer

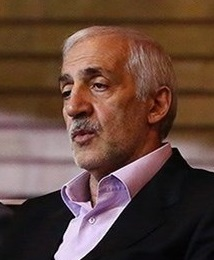
- Dadkan in 2013
- Born: 6 November 1954 (age 71); Tehran, Iran
- Title: President of the Islamic Republic of Iran Football Federation
- Term: 2002–2006
- Predecessor: Mohsen Safaei Farahani
- Successor: Transitional Committee
- Awards: Order of Merit and Management (3rd class)
- Scientific career
- Fields: Physical education
- Workplaces: Shahid Beheshti University; Islamic Azad University
Association football career
- Position: Defender
Senior career*
Years	Team	Apps	(Gls)
1974–1975	Bhutan FC		
1975–1983	Persepolis		
International career
1978–1982	Iran	6	(0)
- * Club domestic league appearances and goals

Mohammad Hossein Dadkan محمد حسين دادکان (born 6 November 1954) is an Iranian former football player who spent most of his playing career with Persepolis FC. He served as President of the Islamic Republic of Iran Football Federation from April 2002 until April 2006.

== Early life ==
He was born in Tehran, Iran.

== Footballing career ==
=== Club career ===
He started his footballing career in the now dissolved Bootan F.C. in Iran. Before long he moved to Persepolis F.C., and spent 8 years playing for Persepolis.

=== International career ===
He was invited to the national team in 1978. He made his debut in a match against Germany. He played his last national match during the 1982 Asian Games and retired from international matches after that tournament.

== Honours ==
=== Club ===
Persepolis

- Iranian Football League (1): 1975-76
  - Runner-up: 1976-77, 1977-78
- Espandi Cup: 1979
- Tehran Provincial League (1): 1982-83
- Tehran Hazfi Cup (1): 1981-82

== IRIFF career ==
In 2002 Mohsen Safaei Farahani, the President of IRIFF at the time, appointed Dadgan as the head of Iran's Premier Football League (IPL). Later on Dadgan became Farahni's assistant as well. But the alliance didn't last, and before long Dadgan started criticizing his boss publicly. Mohsen Farahani resigned from his position after Iranian national team failed to reach the World Cup Finals which was held in Korea and Japan in 2002. Dadgan took the position.

=== Controversies ===
At the start of his presidency Dadgan sacked Branko Ivanković, the manager of the Iranian national football team, and replaced him with his close friend Homayoon Shahrokhi. The decision came as huge surprise to both fans and critics since Shahrokhi's coaching career is not a respectable one and managing the national team was and still is way out of his league. Dadgan insisted that he has made the right choice, but the results showed something else. The national team lost at home to Jordan and came very close to being eliminated from 2006 FIFA World Cup (qualification) in the very first round. Dadgan was forced to bring back Branko Ivanković, but didn't sack Shahrokhi. Instead, he appointed Shahrokhi as Directing Manager of national team, a title that never existed before. This is among many controversial decisions that Dadgan has made. In fact, forcing the former manager in the new manager's coaching staff has never happened before in history of football.

During Iran's World Cup qualification campaign, Dadgan almost showed up at Team Melli's every training session and went along with them to all away games in foreign countries. This has raised many questions about his interference with coaching. The fact that Ivanković's team still plays a lot like Shahrokhi's team, very defensive and cautious, added to the controversy about Dadgan and Shahrokhi's interference with Branko Ivanković's decisions.

But Dadgan's darkest time came at the start of season 2005–2006, when Rah Ahan FC, one of the teams who were promoted to IPL from lower division used false documents on one of their players. According to the IRIFF's laws, the team who uses false documents is known guilty and the results in all the games that they used that player should change to 3–0 to the opponent. By applying this rule Rah Ahan FC should have remained in lower division and Sanat Naft FC should have been promoted. But after a long weeks of debate behind closed doors at IRIFF, the disciplinary committee announced that Rah Ahan FC is guilty, however they will be promoted to IPL. Later, one of the members of the committee revealed that Dadgan had been putting pressure on the committee to keep Rah Ahan FC in the IPL. There were many other incidents when IRIFF simply didn't apply the rules, especially when the decisions involved one of few rich and powerful teams in the IPL. Dadgan's involvement in these cases is undeniable.

Dadgan was fired after Iran's third and final game of their World Cup 2006 campaign. A majority vote by IRIFF officials terminated him from his position. It was the involvement of the government run Physical Education organisation that lead to Iran's suspension from international football by FIFA on 22 November 2006.

== Later career ==
He was reported in the media to be a candidate for Minister of Sport and Youth, but in July 2024, he announced that he had taken himself out of consideration because he "consider[ed] the election a political game", and Mohammad Javad Zarif denied that anyone was even put up for consideration for any cabinet positions in Masoud Pezeshkian's cabinet.

Civic offices
Preceded by Mohsen Safaei Farahani	President of IRIFF; 2002–2006	Succeeded by Mohsen Safaei Farahani
