= Bebar (state constituency) =

Political subdivision in Malaysia

Bebar (N22)
Pahang constituency

State constituency
- Legislature: Pahang State Legislative Assembly
MLA
Mohammad Fakhruddin Mohd Ariff
BN
- Constituency created: 1994
- First contested: 1995
- Last contested: 2022

Demographics
- Population (2020): 29,468
- Electors (2022): 21,294

Bebar is a state constituency in Pahang, Malaysia, that has been represented in the Pahang State Legislative Assembly.

== Demographics ==
Ethnic breakdown of Bebar's electorate as of 2022
1. Malay (62.4%)
2. Other ethnicities (36.0%)
3. Indian (0.85%)
4. Chinese (0.80%)

== History ==
=== Polling districts ===
According to the federal gazette issued on 31 October 2022, the Bebar constituency is divided into 16 polling districts.

State constituency	Polling district	Code	Location
Bebar (N22)	Serambi	085/22/01	SK Serambi
Bebar (N22)	Padang Rumbia	085/22/02	SK Padang Rumbia
Bebar (N22)	Temai	085/22/03	SK Temai
Bebar (N22)	Acheh	085/22/04	SK Kampung Acheh
Bebar (N22)	Tanjung Medang	085/22/05	SK Tanjung Medang
Bebar (N22)	Padang Polo	085/22/06	SK Seri Terentang
Bebar (N22)	Tanjung Batu	085/22/07	SK Tanjung Batu
Bebar (N22)	Landai	085/22/08	SK Nenasi
Bebar (N22)	Nenasi	085/22/09	SMK Nenasi
Bebar (N22)	Merchong	085/22/10	SK Merchong Jaya
Bebar (N22)	Api Larat	085/22/11	Dewan Orang Ramai Kampung Api Larat
Bebar (N22)	Sawah Batu	085/22/12	Balai Raya Kampung Sawah Batu
Bebar (N22)	Kota Perdana	085/22/13	SK Kota Perdana
Bebar (N22)	Simpai	085/22/14	SK Simpai
Bebar (N22)	Runchang	085/22/15	SK Runchang
Bebar (N22)	Bandar Dua	085/22/16	SK Bandar 2 Paloh Hinai

=== Representation history ===
Members of the Legislative Assembly for Bebar
Assembly	No	Years	Name	Party
Constituency created from Peramu, Cini and Kuala Pahang
9th	N19	1995–1999	Ishak Muhamad	BN (UMNO)
10th	N19	1999–2004	Ishak Muhamad	BN (UMNO)
11th	N22	2004–2008	Ishak Muhamad	BN (UMNO)
12th	N22	2008–2013	Ishak Muhamad	BN (UMNO)
13th	N22	2013–2018	Mohammad Fakhruddin Mohd Ariff	BN (UMNO)
14th	N22	2018–2022	Mohammad Fakhruddin Mohd Ariff	BN (UMNO)
15th	N22	2022–present	Mohammad Fakhruddin Mohd Ariff	BN (UMNO)

== Election results ==
Pahang state election, 2022
Party	Candidate	Votes	%	∆%
BN	Mohammad Fakhruddin Mohd Ariff	10,485	67.37	▼3.13
PN	Narzatul Haidar Sakim	4,212	27.06	▲18.71
PH	Ibrahim Sulaiman	866	5.56	▲5.56
Total valid votes		15,563	100.00	
Total rejected ballots		402		
Unreturned ballots		32		
Turnout		15,997	75.12	▼4.85
Registered electors		21,294		
Majority		6,273	40.31	▼9.04
BN hold		Swing		

Pahang state election, 2018
Party	Candidate	Votes	%	∆%
BN	Mohammad Fakhruddin Mohd Ariff	8,172	70.50	▼10.09
PAS	Mohd Nazhar Othman	2,452	21.15	▲21.15
PKR	Afif Syairol Abdul Rahim	968	8.35	▼9.73
Total valid votes		11,592	100.00	
Total rejected ballots		329		
Unreturned ballots		49		
Turnout		11,970	79.97	▼4.21
Registered electors		14,968		
Majority		5,720	49.34	▼11.83
BN hold		Swing		

Pahang state election, 2013
Party	Candidate	Votes	%	∆%
BN	Mohammad Fakhruddin Mohd Ariff	8,846	80.59	▲6.65
PKR	Mohd Jafri Ab Rashid	2,131	19.41	▲19.41
Total valid votes		10,977	100.00	
Total rejected ballots		313		
Unreturned ballots		28		
Turnout		11,318	84.18	▲4.11
Registered electors		13,445		
Majority		6,715	61.17	▲13.30
BN hold		Swing		

Pahang state election, 2008
Party	Candidate	Votes	%	∆%
BN	Ishak Muhamad	5,467	73.94	▼0.07
PAS	Ahiatudin Daud	1,927	26.06	▲0.07
Total valid votes		7,394	100.00	
Total rejected ballots		332		
Unreturned ballots		12		
Turnout		7,738	80.07	▲3.06
Registered electors		9,664		
Majority		3,540	47.88	▼0.15
BN hold		Swing		

Pahang state election, 2004
Party	Candidate	Votes	%	∆%
BN	Ishak Muhamad	5,004	74.01	▲19.01
PAS	Abu Kassim Manaf	1,757	25.96	▼19.01
Total valid votes		6,761	100.00	
Total rejected ballots		231		
Unreturned ballots		19		
Turnout		7,011	77.07	▲2.07
Registered electors		9,104		
Majority		3,247	48.08	▲37.97
BN hold		Swing		

Pahang state election, 1999
Party	Candidate	Votes	%	∆%
BN	Ishak Muhamad	4,442	55.08	▼14.97
PAS	Abu Kassim	3,615	44.82	▲44.82
Total valid votes		8,057	100.00	
Total rejected ballots		318		
Unreturned ballots		11		
Turnout		8,386	75.09	▲2.99
Registered electors		11,202		
Majority		827	10.26	▼29.99
BN hold		Swing		

Pahang state election, 1995
Party	Candidate	Votes	%
BN	Ishak Muhamad	5,066	70.03
S46	Ab Wahab	2,175	30.04
Total valid votes		7,241	100.00
Total rejected ballots		304	
Unreturned ballots		53	
Turnout		7,598	72.42
Registered electors		10,514	
Majority		2,891	39.91
This was a new constituency created.
