= Mohsen Safaei Farahani =

Iranian politician

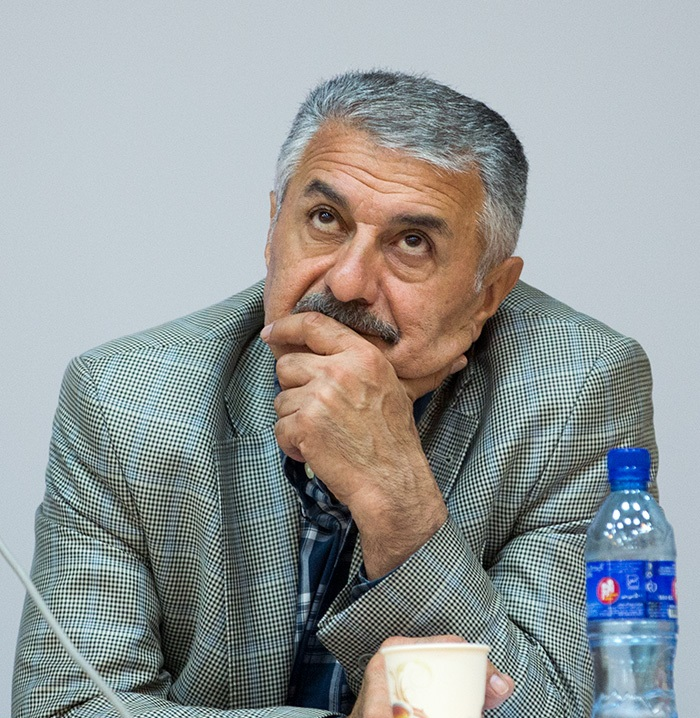
- Safaei Farahani in 2018

Member of Parliament of Iran
- In office 28 May 2000 – 28 May 2004
- Constituency: Tehran, Rey, Shemiranat and Eslamshahr
- Majority: 1,038,602 (35.4%)

Personal details
- Born: 1948 (age 77–78) Tehran, Iran
- Party: Islamic Iran Participation Front

Mohsen Safaei Farahani (Persian: محسن صفایی فراهانی) is an Iranian reformist politician.

== Career ==
He is a member of Mosharekat Party, the main reformist party in Iran under President Khatami. He was a Majlis representative from Tehran from 1999 to 2003. He was also the President of the Iranian Football Federation from 1998 to 2002.

== IFF Transitory Board ==
In November 2006 the federation was suspended by FIFA due to government interference in football matters. In less than a month the ban was lifted and a new Transitory Board was composed of Farahani as chairman, Kiomars Hashemi as deputy chairman and Mohammad Hassan Ansarifar, Dr Hassan Ghafiri, Dr Mohammad Khabiri and Ali Reghbati as members.

The Transitory Board came to an end on January 9, 2008, when Ali Kaffashian was elected as the new president of the Iran Football Federation.

== Arrest ==
Mohsen Safaei Farahani has been himself arrested in June 2009 during the aftermath of the 2009 presidential elections and subsequent protests. Safai Farahani, who has been detained since June 20, was accused of "acting against national security, propaganda against the system, insulting officials and spreading lies "lawyer Hooshang Pour-Babai told the state broadcaster".

Safaei Farahani had been sentenced to six years in jail for the first two charges and acquitted of insulting officials and spreading lies for lack of evidence, adding there would be an appeal.

Sporting positions
Preceded by Dariush Mostafavi	President of the Football Federation of Iran; January 1997–September 2002	Succeeded by Mohammad Dadkan
Preceded by Mohammad Dadkan as President of the Football Federation	Chairman of Transitory Board of the Football Federation of Iran; 9 November 2006–9 January 2008	Succeeded by Ali Kafashian as President of the Football Federation
