= Hamzah Abu Samah =

Malaysian politician

Yang Berbahagia Tan Sri Dato' Sri Hamzah Abu Samah PMN SSAP SPDK SPMS SIMP SMK

7th President of AFC
- In office 9 December 1978 – 1 August 1994
- Preceded by: Kambiz Atabay
- Succeeded by: Ahmad Shah

Minister of Trade and Industry
- In office 1974–1977
- Monarchs: Abdul Halim; Yahya Petra
- Prime Minister: Abdul Razak Hussein; Hussein Onn
- Preceded by: Hussein Onn
- Succeeded by: Mahathir Mohamad

Minister of Culture, Youth and Sports
- In office 22 April 1971 – 1 May 1973
- Monarch: Abdul Halim
- Prime Minister: Abdul Razak Hussein
- Preceded by: Senu Abdul Rahman
- Succeeded by: Ali Ahmad

Member of the Malaysian Parliament for Temerloh
- In office 1974–1982
- Preceded by: Mohamed Yusof Mahmud
- Succeeded by: Sabbaruddin Chik

Member of the Malaysian Parliament for Raub
- In office 1967–1974
- Preceded by: Hussein Hassan
- Succeeded by: Abdullah Majid

Personal details
- Born: 5 January 1924 Kuala Lipis, Pahang, Federated Malay States, British Malaya (now Malaysia)
- Died: 4 September 2012 (aged 88) Mantin, Negeri Sembilan, Malaysia
- Resting place: Makam Pahlawan, Masjid Negara, Kuala Lumpur
- Spouse: Zainon Hussein
- Relations: Abdul Razak Hussein (brother-in-law)
- Children: 7
- Education: Malay College Kuala Kangsar
- Alma mater: Gray's Inn

Hamzah bin Abu Samah (5 January 1924 – 4 September 2012) was a Malaysian politician, lawyer and sports administrator who served as the president of Asian Football Confederation from 9 December 1978 to 1 August 1994. In 2006, he was conferred the FIFA Order of Merit for his contribution towards Asian football. He also one of the fourth Malaysian to join the exclusive club of AFC Diamond of Asia Award with Dato' Seri Najib Tun Razak, Sultan Ahmad Shah and Sultan Abdullah.

== Biography ==
Hamzah was educated at Malay College Kuala Kangsar. He went on to study law at Gray's Inn in England. He became a Member of Parliament representing Raub (1967–1974) and Temerloh (1974–1982) in Dewan Rakyat, Malaysia's parliament.

Additionally he was Minister of Sports and Youth from 22 April 1971 to 1 May 1973 in the Cabinet of Prime Minister Abdul Razak Hussein. He was defence minister from 1973 to 1974 and Trade and Industry Minister from 1974 to 1977. In 1980, he stepped down after having a coronary bypass operation.

He was a member of IOC from 1978 to 2004 and was an honorary member until his death.

Hamzah died on 4 September 2012 in Mantin, Negeri Sembilan. He was 88 years old. His body was buried in Makam Pahlawan near Masjid Negara, Kuala Lumpur.

== Election results ==
Parliament of Malaysia
Year	Constituency	Candidate	Votes	Pct	Opponent(s)	Votes	Pct	Ballots cast	Majority	Turnout
1967	P059 Raub	Hamzah Abu Samah (UMNO)	Unopposed							
1969	P059 Raub	Hamzah Abu Samah (UMNO)	Unopposed							
1974	P072 Temerloh	Hamzah Abu Samah (UMNO)	14,251	75.56%	Kamarulzaman Teh (PRM)	4,609	24.44%	20,300	9,624	73.86%
1978	P072 Temerloh	Hamzah Abu Samah (UMNO)	18,753	70.30%	Ahmad Sulaiman (PAS)	7,922	29.70%	28,644	10,831	75.86%

== Honours ==
=== Honours of Malaysia ===
- Malaysia
  - Commander of the Order of the Defender of the Realm (PMN) – Tan Sri (1983)
- Kedah
  - Companion of the Order of the Crown of Kedah (SMK) (1966)
- Pahang
  - Knight Grand Companion of the Order of Sultan Ahmad Shah of Pahang (SSAP) – Dato' Sri (1977)
  - Knight Grand Companion of the Order of the Crown of Pahang (SIMP) – formerly Dato', now Dato' Indera
- Sabah
  - Grand Commander of the Order of Kinabalu (SPDK) – Datuk Seri Panglima (1974)
- Selangor
  - Knight Grand Commander of the Order of the Crown of Selangor (SPMS) – Dato' Seri (1987)

Civic offices
Preceded by Kambiz Atabay	President of Asian Football Confederation; 1978–1994	Succeeded by Ahmad Shah of Pahang
