= Mirshad Majedi =

Iranian footballer (born 1968)

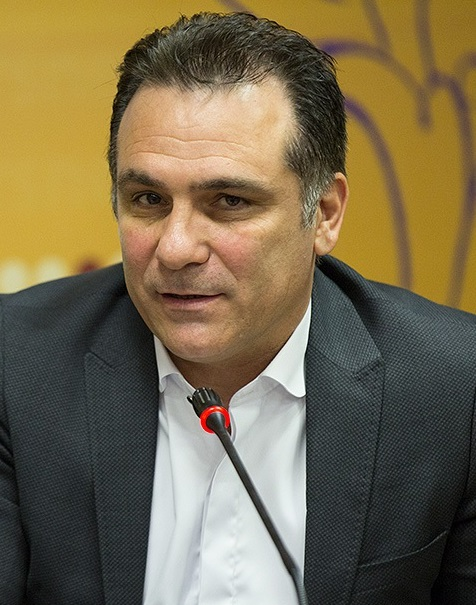

Personal information
- Full name: Seyed Mirshad Majedi
- Date of birth: December 14, 1968 (age 57)
- Place of birth: Tehran, Iran
- Position: Forward

Youth career
- 1988–1991: Esteghlal

Senior career*
Years	Team	Apps	(Gls)
1990–1995	Esteghlal		
1992–1994	→ Sanaye Defah (loan)		
1994–1995	→ Keshavarz (loan)		
1995–1997	BEC Tero Sasana		
1997–2000	TOT		
2000–2001	TTM Lopburi		
2001–2004	Hoàng Anh Gia Lai		

International career
1990–1991	Iran U-17		
1991–1993	Iran U-20		
1992–1994	Iran U-23		
- * Club domestic league appearances and goals

Seyed Mirshad Majedi (Persian: میرشاد ماجدی سید born 14 December 1968) is a retired Iranian football player and administrator who is acting president of Football Federation Islamic Republic of Iran from February to August 2022. He was team manager of Esteghlal and Police Tero F.C and Iran national team.

== Early life ==
He was born on 14 December 1968 in Tehran, Iran. He graduated in Strategic Sport Management with a Ph.D. degree in 2018.

== Playing career ==
=== Club career ===
He started his playing career in 1988 with joining Esteghlal Academy. He promoted to the first team squad in 1990 and helped the team in winning AFC Champions League in 1990–91 season for the second time. During 1992–93 season, he was loaned to Sanaye Defah. He played for the team two seasons and became top scorer at Tehran Football Competitions in 1993–94 season. Then, he was loaned to Keshavarz and became top scorer of 2nd Division in 1994–95 season. He returned to Esteghlal at the end of the season but was transferred to the Thai Premier League side BEC Tero Sasana in winter 1995. He played for the team until 1997 when he joined another Thai team TOT. Then he played for TTM Lopburi one season and joined V.League team, Hoàng Anh Gia Lai in 2001. He played three seasons for the club before his retirement. He announced his retirement in July 2004.

=== International career ===
Majedi had played for Iran U-17, Iran U-20 and Iran U-23. He was invited to the junior team in 1993 but never played.

== Administrator career ==
After his retirement, he became technical adviser to the Football Association of Thailand. Then, he was appointed as team manager of Iran national under-23 futsal team and after two years, he became team manager at the Iran national futsal team. In June 2007, he became team manager of Iran U-17 and Iran U-20 teams. After Amir Ghalenoei became head coach of Iran national football team, Majedi joined his technical staff as executive director. He was also head of Department of Futsal of Esteghlal from 2009 to 2010. From 2010 to 2012, he was deputy chairman of Paykan. Then, he became adviser to the Amir Ghalenoei, chairman of Esteghlal. Before the start of 2012–13 season, Majedi was named as team manager of the club, replacing Mansour Pourheidari.

== Honors ==
Esteghlal

- AFC Champions League (1): 1990–91
- Iranian Football League runner-up (1): 1991–92
- Hazfi Cup runner-up (1): 1991–92

Hoàng Anh Gia Lai

- V.League: 2003, 2004
- Super Cup: 2003
- First Division: 2001–02
