= Shahaboddin Azizi Khadem =

Sport administrator of Iran

Shahaboddin Azizi-Khadem
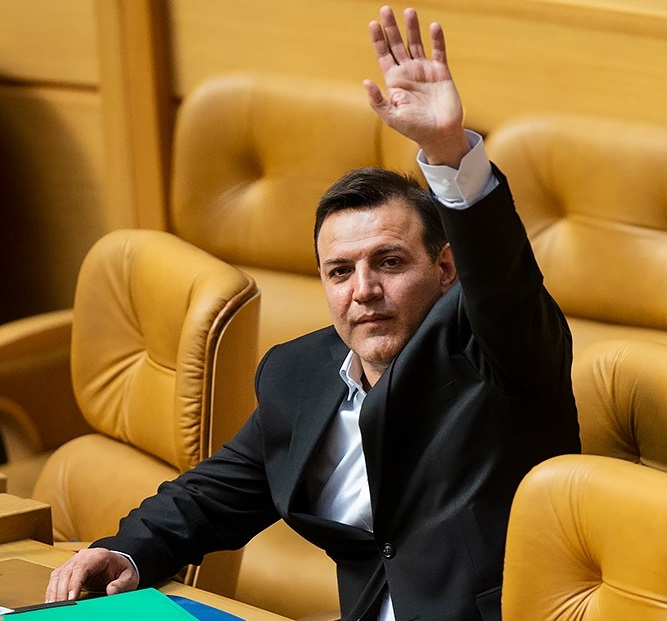
- Azizi-Khadem in 2021
- Born: January 21, 1978 (age 48); Poldokhtar, Iran

Shahaboddin Azizi Khadem (Persian: شهاب الدین عزیزی خادم, born January 21, 1978 in Pol-e Dokhtar) is an Iranian sports executive and administrator. On February 28, 2021, he became the President of Football Federation of Iran by a majority of votes. Before his presidency in football federation, he was working in the Ministry of Welfare and Social Security and was also the parliamentary and legal deputy minister of the respective ministry.

He was removed from the office of president of the Iran Football Federation on February 17, 2022.
