= Ali Kafashian =

- علی کفاشیان
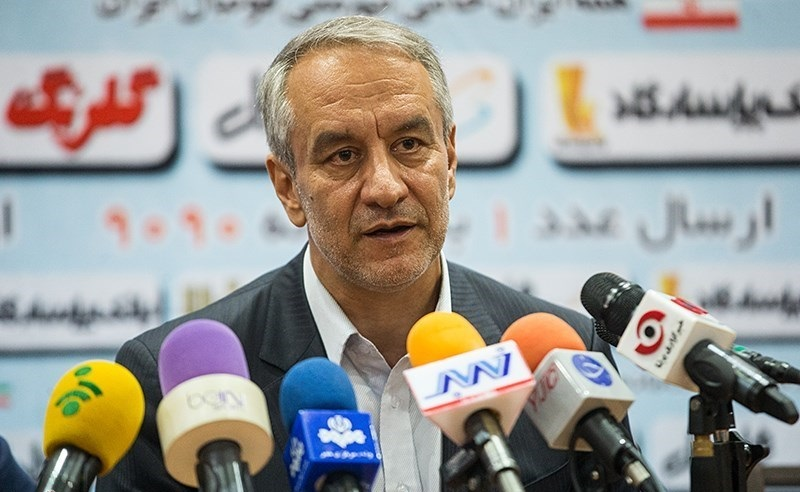
- Kafashian in 2015
- Born: 6 August 1954 (age 72); Nain, Isfahan province, Iran
- Education: Shahid Beheshti University; Maastricht University
- Occupation: Football administrator

Ali Kafashian (Persian: علی کفاشیان, born on 6 August 1954) is an Iranian businessman, economist, a retired athlete and former president of the Football Federation Islamic Republic of Iran, a position he had held from 1 March 2008 to 7 May 2016. As of 2015 to 2019, he also served as one of five Vice presidents at the Asian Football Confederation (AFC).

He previously served as Secretary General of Iran's National Olympic Committee from 2004 until 2008. Kaffashian was elected as President of Iranian Football Federation in 2008, in a race with no other contenders, and was re-elected in March 2012, after he defeated Hossein Gharib. He is also an employee of Central Bank of Iran.

== Suspension ==
In June 2019, Ali Kafashian and Abbas Torabian were suspended by the Iranian Football Federation's Ethic Committee for financial corruption.

Civic offices
Preceded by Mohsen Safaei Farahani	President of IRIFF; 2008–2016	Succeeded by Mehdi Taj
