= Mostafa Mokri =

Iranian footballer (1921–2005)

Personal information
- Full name: Mostafa Mokri
- Date of birth: December 6, 1921
- Place of birth: Tehran, Iran
- Date of death: January 3, 2005 (aged 83)
- Place of death: Tehran, Iran

Senior career*
Years	Team	Apps	(Gls)
1940–1944	Toufan		

International career
1944	Tehran XI		
- * Club domestic league appearances and goals

Mostafa Mokri (Persian: مصطفی مکری; December 6, 1921 – January 3, 2005) was an Iranian footballer. He served most of his career at Toufan. He was also former chairman of IRIFF and Persepolis.

== Playing career ==
Mokri joined Toufan in 1940, when Hossein Sadaghiani was a member of the team. During those years, they had a huge contest with Daraei for Tehran League championship. He won Tehran League in 1944 and was called up for Tehran XI team.

== Chairmanship career ==
=== Iran football federation ===
Mokri became chairman of Iran football federation twice. He made a good contribution and caused a revolution in Iranian football system in his chairmaning career. The first period was between 1958 and 1960, which he established "Iranian Regional cup" _The very first football league consisting teams from different parts of Iran_ in that. in the second period, between 1967 and 1972, Iran national football team won Asian Cup twice. Masoud Boroumand was his deputy during this time.

=== Persepolis F.C. ===
Mokri was selected as chairman of Persepolis F.C. by Ali Abdeh in 1975, and remained at the post until Iranian Islamic Revolution in 1979.

== Personal life ==
Mokri retired from football in 1944. He went to France and graduated in physical education. Then he married a French woman. His wife died in 1993.

Business positions
Preceded by Ali Abdo	Persepolis chairman 1975–1979	Succeeded by Abbas Vakil
