= Lanchang (state constituency) =

Political subdivision in Malaysia

Lanchang (N31)
Pahang constituency

State constituency
- Legislature: Pahang State Legislative Assembly
MLA
Hasan Omar
PN
- Constituency created: 1984
- First contested: 1986
- Last contested: 2022

Demographics
- Electors (2022): 32,774

Lanchang is a state constituency in Pahang, Malaysia, that is represented in the Pahang State Legislative Assembly.

== Demographics ==
Ethnic breakdown of Lanchang's electorate as of 2022
1. Malay (74.3%)
2. Indian (10.9%)
3. Chinese (8.46%)
4. Other ethnicities (6.24%)

== History ==
=== Polling districts ===
According to the federal gazette issued on 31 October 2022, the Lanchang constituency is divided into 17 polling districts.

State constituency	Polling district	Code	Location
Lanchang (N31）	Tanjung Belengu	088/31/01	SK Lebak; SK Belengu
Lanchang (N31）	Pangsenam	088/31/02	Madrasah Ad-Diniah Kg Pangsenam
Lanchang (N31）	Buntut Pulau	088/31/03	SK Kampung Tengah
Lanchang (N31）	Ladang Yeow Cheng Luan	088/31/04	SJK (C) Yeow Cheng Luan
Lanchang (N31）	Desa Bakti	088/31/05	SK Desa Bakti
Lanchang (N31）	Sri Layang	088/31/06	SMK Seri Semantan
Lanchang (N31）	Batu Kapur	088/31/07	SK Batu Kapor
Lanchang (N31）	Ladang Edensor	088/31/08	SJK (T) Ladang Edensor
Lanchang (N31）	Sungai Kepong	088/31/09	Balai Raya Sungai Kepong
Lanchang (N31）	Rantau Panjang	088/31/10	SK Rantau Panjang
Lanchang (N31）	Kampung Dala	088/31/11	Balai Raya Kampung Dala
Lanchang (N31）	Kuala Kawang	088/31/12	SK Kuala Kaung
Lanchang (N31）	Bandar Lanchang	088/31/13	SMK Lanchang
Lanchang (N31）	Mempatih	088/31/14	SK Lubok Terua
Lanchang (N31）	Bolok	088/31/15	SK Bolok
Lanchang (N31）	FELDA Bukit Damar	088/31/16	SK LKTP Bukit Damar
Lanchang (N31）	FELDA Lakum	088/31/17	SK LKTP Lakum

=== Representation history ===
Members of the Legislative Assembly for Lanchang
Assembly	No	Years	Name	Party
Constituency created from Karak, Semantan and Kerdau
Lancang
7th	N24	1986-1990	V. V. Aboo	BN (MIC)
8th	N24	1990-1995	Bahari Yahaya	BN (UMNO)
9th	N27	1995-1999	Bahari Yahaya	BN (UMNO)
10th	N27	1999-2004	Mohd Sharkar Shamsudin	BN (UMNO)
Lanchang
11th	N31	2004-2008	Mohd Sharkar Shamsudin	BN (UMNO)
12th	N31	2008-2013	Mohd Sharkar Shamsudin	BN (UMNO)
13th	N31	2013-2018	Mohd Sharkar Shamsudin	BN (UMNO)
14th	N31	2018-2022	Mohd Sharkar Shamsudin	BN (UMNO)
15th	N31	2022–present	Hasan Omar	PN (PAS)

== Election results ==
Pahang state election, 2022
Party	Candidate	Votes	%	∆%
PN	Hasan Omar	10,024	40.15	▲14.48
BN	Razmi Sudin	9,573	38.34	▼8.50
PH	Rosli Ismail	4,840	19.38	▲19.38
PEJUANG	Zaini Mohamad	328	1.31	▲1.31
Parti Rakyat Malaysia	Abd Jamil Yaakub	203	0.81	▲0.81
Total valid votes		24,968	100.00	
Total rejected ballots		361		
Unreturned ballots		54		
Turnout		25,383	77.45	▼4.17
Registered electors		32,774		
Majority		451	1.81	▼17.97
PN gain from BN		Swing		?

Pahang state election, 2018
Party	Candidate	Votes	%	∆%
BN	Mohd Sharkar Shamsudin	8,824	46.84	▼6.03
PKR	Abas Awang	5,099	27.07	▼20.07
PAS	Hassan Omar	4,836	25.67	▲25.67
Independent	Mohd Khaidir Ahmad	80	0.42	▲0.42
Total valid votes		18,839	100.00	
Total rejected ballots		428		
Unreturned ballots		81		
Turnout		19,348	81.62	▼4.11
Registered electors		23,706		
Majority		3,725	19.77	▲14.04
BN hold		Swing		

Pahang state election, 2013
Party	Candidate	Votes	%	∆%
BN	Mohd Sharkar Shamsudin	10,393	52.87	▼4.84
PKR	Ahmad Nizam Hamid	9,266	47.13	▲4.84
Total valid votes		19,659	100.00	
Total rejected ballots		550		
Unreturned ballots		42		
Turnout		20,251	85.72	▲8.96
Registered electors		23,624		
Majority		1,127	5.73	▼9.68
BN hold		Swing		

Pahang state election, 2008
Party	Candidate	Votes	%	∆%
BN	Mohd Sharkar Shamsudin	8,010	57.70	▼14.18
PKR	Ahmad Saim Abu Bakar	5,871	42.30	▲42.30
Total valid votes		13,881	100.00	
Total rejected ballots		318		
Unreturned ballots		52		
Turnout		14,251	76.77	▲0.11
Registered electors		18,564		
Majority		2,139	15.41	▼28.36
BN hold		Swing		

Pahang state election, 2004
Party	Candidate	Votes	%	∆%
BN	Mohd Sharkar Shamsudin	8,320	71.89	▲10.21
PAS	Hassanuddin Salim	3,254	28.11	▼10.21
Total valid votes		11,574	100.00	
Total rejected ballots		443		
Unreturned ballots		759		
Turnout		12,776	76.65	▲2.78
Registered electors		16,667		
Majority		5,066	43.77	▲20.42
BN hold		Swing		

Pahang state election, 1999: Lancang
Party	Candidate	Votes	%	∆%
BN	Mohd Sharkar Shamsudin	6,971	61.67	▼14.97
PAS	Abu Kassim Manaf	4,332	38.33	▲38.33
Total valid votes		11,303	100.00	
Total rejected ballots		353		
Unreturned ballots		86		
Turnout		11,742	73.87	▲1.09
Registered electors		15,895		
Majority		2,639	23.35	▼29.94
BN hold		Swing		

Pahang state election, 1995: Lancang
Party	Candidate	Votes	%	∆%
BN	Bahari Yahaya	8,095	76.64	▲8.97
S46	Saari Abd Manap	2,467	23.36	▼8.97
Total valid votes		10,562	100.00	
Total rejected ballots		309		
Unreturned ballots		3		
Turnout		10,874	72.78	▲0.01
Registered electors		14,940		
Majority		5,628	53.29	▲17.93
BN hold		Swing		

Pahang state election, 1990: Lancang
Party	Candidate	Votes	%	∆%
BN	Bahari Yahaya	4,801	67.68	▲67.68
S46	Mohamed Saludin Omar	2,293	32.32	▲32.32
Total valid votes		7,094	100.00	
Total rejected ballots		391		
Unreturned ballots		7		
Turnout		7,492	72.77	▲2.41
Registered electors		10,295		
Majority		2,508	35.35	▼0.41
BN hold		Swing		

Pahang state election, 1986: Lancang
Party	Candidate	Votes	%
BN	V.V Aboo M. Ahammu	4,145	67.88
PAS	Abu Hassan Sintol	1,961	32.12
Total valid votes		6,106	100.00
Total rejected ballots		348	
Unreturned ballots		0	
Turnout		6,454	70.36
Registered electors		9,173	
Majority		2,184	35.77
This was a new constituency created.
