= Mohd Sharkar Shamsudin =

Malaysian politician

Yang Berhormat Dato' Sri Mohd Sharkar Shamsudin SSAP SIMP DSAP DIMP
- محمد شارکار شمس الدين

Speaker of the Pahang State Legislative Assembly
- Incumbent
- Assumed office 29 December 2022
- Monarch: Abdullah
- Deputy: Lee Chin Chen
- Menteri Besar: Wan Rosdy Wan Ismail
- Preceded by: Ishak Muhamad
- Constituency: Non-MLA

Member of the Pahang State Executive Council (Information, Science Technology and Innovation : 8 April 2004–12 March 2008) (Information, Science, Technology, Innovation & Biotechnology : 13 March 2008–15 May 2013) (Tourism and Culture:16 May 2013–14 May 2018) (Tourism, Environment, Plantation and Commodities : 15 May 2018–28 November 2022)
- In office 15 May 2018 – 28 November 2022
- Monarchs: Ahmad Shah (2018–2019); Abdullah (2019–2022)
- Menteri Besar: Wan Rosdy Wan Ismail
- Preceded by: Himself (Tourism); Mohd Soffi Abd Razak (Environment)
- Succeeded by: Sim Chon Siang (Tourism); Johari Harun (Environment); Mohd Soffi Abd Razak (Plantation & Biotechnology)
- Constituency: Lanchang
- In office 16 May 2013 – 14 May 2018
- Monarch: Ahmad Shah
- Menteri Besar: Adnan Yaakob
- Preceded by: Shafik Fauzan Sharif (Tourism); Wan Adnan Wan Mamat (Culture)
- Succeeded by: Himself (Tourism); Shahaniza Shamsuddin (Culture)
- Constituency: Lanchang
- In office 13 March 2008 – 15 May 2013
- Monarch: Ahmad Shah
- Menteri Besar: Adnan Yaakob
- Preceded by: Mohd Soffi Abdul Razak
- Succeeded by: Adnan Yaakob
- Constituency: Lanchang
- In office 8 April 2004 – 12 March 2008
- Monarch: Ahmad Shah
- Menteri Besar: Adnan Yaakob
- Preceded by: Bahari Yahaya (Housing); Omar Othman (Village Growth Centre)
- Succeeded by: Mohd Soffi Abd Razak
- Constituency: Lanchang

Member of the Pahang State Legislative Assembly for Lanchang
- In office 29 November 1999 – 19 November 2022
- Preceded by: Bahari Yahaya (BN–UMNO)
- Succeeded by: Hasan Omar (PN–PAS)
- Majority: 2,639 (1999); 5,066 (2004); 2,139 (2008); 1,127 (2013); 3,725 (2018)

Faction represented in Pahang State Legislative Assembly
- 1999–2022: Barisan Nasional

Personal details
- Born: Mohd Sharkar Shamsudin; 25 July 1962 (age 64) Temerloh, Pahang, Malaysia
- Citizenship: Malaysian
- Party: United Malays National Organisation (UMNO)
- Other political affiliations: Barisan Nasional (BN)
- Spouse: Mustakizah Sulaiman
- Children: 4
- Education: Indiana State University

Mohd Sharkar bin Shamsudin (born 25 July 1962) is a Malaysian politician who has served as Speaker of the Pahang State Legislative Assembly since December 2022. He served as a Member of the Pahang State Executive Council (EXCO) in the Barisan Nasional (BN) state administration under Menteris Besar Adnan Yaakob and Wan Rosdy Wan Ismail from April 2004 to November 2022 and Member of the Pahang State Legislative Assembly (MLA) for Lanchang from November 1999 to November 2022. He is also a member of the United Malays National Organisation (UMNO), a component party of the BN coalition. He is also a member of the Supreme Council of UMNO.

== Political career ==
He first contested and won the Lanchang state seat in the 1999 Pahang state election. He was reelected as the Lanchang MLA four times in the 2004, 2008, 2013 and 2018 Pahang state elections. He also contested for Temerloh federal seat in the 2018 general election and lost. He was transferred from the Lanchang state seat to contest for the Temerloh seat in the 2022 general election and lost again.

Mohd Sharkar has held various party positions at UMNO at different levels : (Earlier days)

- UMNO Club of California Deputy Chairman (1989-1991)
- UMNO Youth Mentakab Division Deputy Chief (1993-1995)
- UMNO Mentakab Division Chief Information (1993-1995)
- UMNO Youth Malaysia Secretary Executive (1993-1996)
- UMNO Youth Mentakab Division Chief (1995-2001)
- UMNO Youth Pahang Chief Information (1998-2000)
- UMNO Temerloh/Mentakab Division Deputy Chief (2001-2008)
- UMNO Temerloh Division Chief (2008–2023)
- UMNO Pahang Chief Information (2000-2009)
- UMNO Pahang Deputy Chairman (2009-2018)

• UMNO Pahang Committee Members (2000–present)

- UMNO Supreme Council (2013–present)

== Education ==
He was born and raised in Temerloh, Mohd Sharkar completed his secondary in the Technical Institute of Kuantan in 1979. He continued his Form Six at Yayasan Anda Akademik before he furthered his study in the USA. He graduated from Indiana State University, Terre Haute, Indiana, where he received a Bachelor's Science Degree in Business Administration in 1986. In June 2013, he was appointed as Chairman of the Pahang State Tourism and Culture Committee.

== Personal life ==
Mohd Sharkar is married to Mustakizah Sulaiman and has four children and 5 grandchildren. He is a strong supporter of Sri Pahang in the Malaysia Premier League and Liverpool in the English Premier League.

== Election results ==
Pahang State Legislative Assembly
Year	Constituency	Candidate	Votes	Pct	Opponent(s)	Votes	Pct	Ballots cast	Majority	Turnout
1999	N27 Lanchang	Mohd Sharkar Shamsudin (UMNO)	6,971	59.37%	Abu Kassim Manaf (PAS)	4,332	36.89%	11,742	2,639	73.87%
2004	N31 Lanchang	Mohd Sharkar Shamsudin (UMNO)	8,320	65.12%	Hasssanuddin Salim (PAS)	3,254	25.47%	12,776	5,066	76.65%
2008	N31 Lanchang	Mohd Sharkar Shamsudin (UMNO)	8,010	56.21%	Ahmad Saim Abu Bakar (PKR)	5,871	41.20%	14,251	2,139	76.77%
2013	N31 Lanchang	Mohd Sharkar Shamsudin (UMNO)	10,393	51.32%	Ahmad Nizam Hamid (PKR)	9,266	45.76%	20,251	1,127	85.70%
2018	N31 Lanchang	Mohd Sharkar Shamsudin (UMNO)	8,824	45.61%	Abas Awan (PKR)	5,099	26.35%	19,348	3,725	81.62%
2018	N31 Lanchang	Mohd Sharkar Shamsudin (UMNO)	8,824	45.61%	Hasan Omar (PAS)	4,836	25.00%	19,348	3,725	81.62%
2018	N31 Lanchang	Mohd Sharkar Shamsudin (UMNO)	8,824	45.61%	Mohd Khaidir Ahmad (IND)	80	0.41%	19,348	3,725	81.62%

Parliament of Malaysia
Year	Constituency	Candidate	Votes	Pct	Opponent(s)	Votes	Pct	Ballots cast	Majority	Turnout
2018	P088 Temerloh	Mohd Sharkar Shamsudin (UMNO)	22,094	36.19%	Mohd Anuar Mohd Tahir (AMANAH)	23,998	39.31%	62,204	1,904	82.85%
2018	P088 Temerloh	Mohd Sharkar Shamsudin (UMNO)	22,094	36.19%	Md Jusoh Darus (PAS)	14,734	24.13%	62,204	1,904	82.85%
2018	P088 Temerloh	Mohd Sharkar Shamsudin (UMNO)	22,094	36.19%	Mohd Khaidir Ahmad (IND)	178	0.29%	62,204	1,904	82.85%
2018	P088 Temerloh	Mohd Sharkar Shamsudin (UMNO)	22,094	36.19%	Muhd Fakhrudin Abu Hanipah (IND)	46	0.08%	62,204	1,904	82.85%
2022	P088 Temerloh	Mohd Sharkar Shamsudin (UMNO)	25,191	30.48%	Salamiah Mohd Nor (PAS)	30,929	37.43%	82,637	5,520	77.35%
2022	P088 Temerloh	Mohd Sharkar Shamsudin (UMNO)	25,191	30.48%	Mohd Hasbie Muda (AMANAH)	25,409	30.75%	82,637	5,520	77.35%
2022	P088 Temerloh	Mohd Sharkar Shamsudin (UMNO)	25,191	30.48%	Aminuddin Yahaya (PEJUANG)	1,108	1.34%	82,637	5,520	77.35%

== Honours ==
- Pahang
  - Knight Grand Companion of the Order of Sultan Ahmad Shah of Pahang (SSAP) – Dato' Sri (2014)
  - Knight Grand Companion of the Order of the Crown of Pahang (SIMP) – Dato' Indera (2012)
  - Knight Companion of the Order of Sultan Ahmad Shah of Pahang (DSAP) – Dato' (2007)
  - Knight Companion of the Order of the Crown of Pahang (DIMP) – Dato' (2004)
