= Football Federation Islamic Republic of Iran =

Governing body of association football in Iran

AFC
- Short name: FFIRI
- Founded: 1920; 106 years ago
- Headquarters: Tehran, Iran
- FIFA affiliation: 1948
- AFC affiliation: 1954
- CAFA affiliation: 2015
- President: Mehdi Taj
- Website: www.ffiri.ir

The Football Federation Islamic Republic of Iran (FFIRI; Persian: فدراسیون فوتبال جمهوری اسلامی ایران, romanized: Fedrasion-e Football-e Jomhuri-e Eslami-e Iran) is the governing body for football in Iran. It was founded in 1920. The federation has been a member of FIFA since 1948 and a member of the Asian Football Confederation since 1958.

== History ==
The federation was founded in 1920, has been a member of FIFA since 1948, and a member of the Asian Football Confederation since 1954.

In 2001, Iran was a founding member of the West Asian Football Federation, along with Iraq, Jordan, Lebanon, Palestine, and Syria.

In 2014, Iran was a founding member of the Central Asian Football Association alongside Afghanistan, Kyrgyzstan, Tajikistan, Turkmenistan, and Uzbekistan.

== Controversies ==
On 23 November 2006, the federation was suspended by FIFA, due to government interference in football matters. FIFA rules decree that a national football federation should remain autonomous from the national government. However, on 17 December 2006, the ban was lifted and a new Transitory Board was composed.

During the 2009 Iranian election protests, seven members of the Iran national football team were initially reported to have been banned for life by the federation for wearing green armbands in support of the Iranian Green Movement.

Iran women's national football team was briefly suspended by FIFA from international competition in 2011 for being required by the federation to wear headscarves.

In 2015, the federation banned players from the men's national team due to conscription problems.

In August 2017, the federation banned Masoud Shojaei and Ehsan Hajsafi from the national team after they played against the Israeli club Maccabi Tel Aviv in the UEFA Europa League.

On 9 November 2018 Fatma Samoura, Secretary General of International Federation of Football Association FIFA said she would ask the Iranian government to end the ban on women's entry to sports stadiums. On 7 August 2019, Mohammad Jafar Montazeri, prosecutor general of Iran, supporting the ban, said that it should not concern FIFA if women in Iran can enter sports stadiums or not. However, after continuous pressure from FIFA, IRNA deputy Sports Minister Jamshid Taghizadeh said women would be allowed to enter Azadi Stadium to watch the men's World Cup 2022 qualifier match between Iran and Cambodia in October. However, in March 2022, Iranian women were again banned from entering the stadium for a World Cup qualifier.

During the 2022 FIFA World Cup as well as the 2023 AFC Asian Cup, the Iranian government and federation reportedly sent paid members of the Basij and IRGC to cheer for the team in the stands and to counter protesters.

In April 2024, goalkeeper Hossein Hosseini was summoned, suspended, and fined by the Iranian federation for hugging a female fan. In October 2024, Zahra Ghanbari was suspended and forced to apologize by the Iranian federation for "improper hijab" during a goal celebration at the 2024–25 AFC Women's Champions League. In December 2024, defender Ramin Rezaeian was summoned by the federation as well after hugging a female fan.

=== 2026 ===
Prior to the 2026 FIFA World Cup draw, a group stage match scheduled to be played in Seattle was designated as a "Pride Match" by the City of Seattle to coincide with the city's annual Pride celebrations and to promote LGBTQ+ inclusion. Following the draw, the fixture was confirmed to be the match between Iran and Egypt. Both Iran and Egypt are countries where homosexuality is criminalized under domestic law, with Iran in particular having imposed capital punishment in certain cases. The Iranian Football Federation and the Egyptian Football Association objected to the match's designation; however, FIFA and local organizers confirmed that associated LGBTQ+ events would proceed, and that rainbow flags would be permitted inside the stadium.

In January 2026, multiple Iranian footballers and athletes were killed during the 2026 Iran massacres amid the 2025–2026 Iranian protests, including former Tractor Sazi F.C. midfielder Mojtaba Tarshiz, prompting former Iran national team captain Masoud Shojaei to criticise FIFA for its silence over the killing of Iranian athletes during protests, while then-captain Mehdi Taremi expressed solidarity with the Iranian people. On 14 January, the federation, along with the Islamic Republic of Iran Wrestling Federation, were exempt from posting a picture to their Instagram accounts opposing Donald Trump's threats to attack Iran for its response to the protests, and also claiming that athletes were killed during the Twelve-Day War. After the massacres, the AFC ruled that Iranian clubs cannot host AFC Champions League Elite and AFC Champions League Two matches at home, and would therefore have to move them to neutral venues. Following the massacres, activists called on FIFA to ban the Iranian national team from the 2026 FIFA World Cup. Ali Karimi, a former footballer for the Iran national team, along with a coalition of prominent Iranians, wrote an open letter to FIFA and all its member associations, calling on FIFA president Gianni Infantino to speak up on the protest deaths. Following the protests and ensuing crackdown, the Spanish Football Federation reportedly pulled out of a planned friendly match with Iran.

After a number of players resigned from the Iran women's national football team and refereeing organization following the massacres, the Iranian football federation reportedly threatened them with multi-year bans from professional football activities, judicial action, and long prison sentences. In March 2026, after the Iran women's national football team players refused to sing the national anthem of the Islamic Republic as a form of silent protest ahead of their 2026 AFC Women's Asian Cup opener against South Korea, concerns grew for their safety following threats from Iranian state media. Ahead of the following match against Australia, the national team players were reportedly forced to sing the national anthem of the Islamic Republic of Iran, with threats to the players' family members if they did not. After the team's exit from the tournament on 8 March, members of the team gave what appeared to be SOS hand signals from the bus as they were leaving, leading to protests and growing calls for Australia to offer the team refuge after the players were accused of being wartime traitors by Iranian state media for not singing the national anthem of the Islamic Republic in their opening game amid the Iran War.

Amid the Iran War, Sardar Azmoun was reportedly expelled from the national team after posting a picture on social media, per IRGC-affiliated media.

On April 30, 2026, protests were held outside the 2026 FIFA Congress in Vancouver, calling on FIFA to ban the Iranian team and stating that it represents the Islamic Revolutionary Guard Corps (IRGC) instead of the people of Iran. On May 19, it was reported that FIFA would again ban the pre-revolutionary Lion and Sun flag from World Cup stadiums, similar to previous World Cups.

== Competitions ==
=== Men's ===
- Persian Gulf Pro League
- Azadegan League
- League 2 (Iran)
- League 3 (Iran)
- Hazfi Cup
- Iranian Super Cup

=== Women's ===
- Kowsar Women Football League
- Hazfi Cup (women)
- Iranian Supercup (women)

== Membership ==
Organization	Affiliation	Notes
FIFA	Since 1950; 76 years ago	—N/a
AFC	Since 1954; 72 years ago	—N/a
WAFF	2001–2014; 13 years	Founding member
CAFA	Since 2015; 11 years ago	Founding member

== Presidents ==
Old Logo of the Iran Football Federation (until 1979)

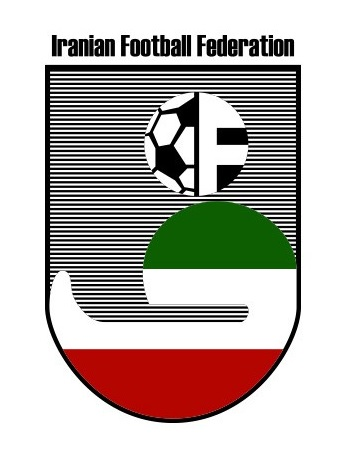
Jersey badge of Team Melli at the 1978 FIFA World Cup

Presidency	President	Took office	Left office	Note
1	Ali Kani	1947	1950	Runners-up of 1951 Asian Games
2	Hedayatollah Gilanshah	1950	1952	Commander of Imperial Iranian Air Force (1952)
3	Mohsen Haddad	1952		
4	Hossein Siasi	1952	1953	
(3)	Mohsen Haddad	1953	1954	second term
(4)	Hossein Siasi	1954		second term
(1)	Ali Kani	1954	1955	second term
5	Mostafa Salimi	1955	1956	
6	Hossein-Ali Mobasher	1956	1958	
7	Mostafa Mokri	1958	1960	
8	Zabih Khabiri	1960	1961	
9	Hossein Soroudi	1961	1962	
(6)	Hossein-Ali Mobasher	1962	1967	second term qualified to 1964 Olympics; Runners-up of 1966 Asian Games
(9)	Hossein Soroudi	1967	1968	second term
(7)	Mostafa Mokri	1968	1972	second term winner of 1968 Asian Cup and 1972 Asian Cup qualified to 1972 Olympics
10	Kambiz Atabay	1972	1979	Presidents of AFC (1 August 1976 - 9 December 1978) qualified to 1978 World Cup qualified to 1976 Olympics winner of 1976 Asian Cup; Founder of Takht Jamshid Cup winner of 1974 Asian Games
11	Naser Noamooz	1979	1980	first president after Revolution qualified to 1980 Olympics but boycotted the event Third place of 1980 Asian Cup
12	Hadi Tavoosi	1980	1981	
13	Hossein Abshenasan	1981		
14	Hossein Raghfar	1981	1982	youngest president of FFIRI ever at 28 years old
(13)	Hossein Abshenasan	1982	1983	second term
15	Behrooz Sahabeh	1984		
16	Nasrollah Sajjadi	1985		
17	Ali Mohammad Mortazavi	1986	1987	
18	Mohammad Reza Pahlavan	1987	1989	Third place of 1988 Asian Cup
(11)	Naser Noamooz	1989	1993	second term winner of 1990 Asian Games; Founder of Azadegan League
19	Mohammad Safizadeh	1993	1994	
20	Amir Abedini	1994		chairman of Persepolis (1993—2001)
21	Dariush Mostafavi	1994	1997	Third place of 1996 Asian Cup
22	Mohsen Safaei Farahani	1997	2002	qualified to 1998 World Cup winner of 1998 Asian Games and 2002 Asian Games; Founder of Iran Pro League winner of 1998 FIFA Fair Play Award member of Iranian Parliament (2000-2004)
23	Mohammad Dadkan	2002	2006	Third place of 2004 Asian Cup qualified to 2006 World Cup; Third place of 2006 Asian Games
(22)	Mohsen Safaei Farahani	2006	2008	second term interim, appointed by FIFA
24	Ali Kafashian	2008	2016	qualified to 2014 World Cup; 2008 and 2012 Best Asian Football Federation of the Year
25	Mehdi Taj	2016	2019	qualified to 2018 World Cup
—	Heydar Baharvand (acting)	2019	2021	
26	Shahaboddin Azizi Khadem	2021	2022	qualified to 2022 World Cup; Dismissal due to incompetence
—	Mirshad Majedi (acting)	2022		
(25)	Mehdi Taj	2022	Present	second and third term

#	President	Stability
1	Ali Kafashian	8 years and 4 months
2	Mehdi Taj	7 years and 10 months
3	Kambiz Atabay	6 years and 4 months
4	Mohsen Safaei Farahani	4 years and 9 months
5	Mostafa Mokri	4 years and 6 months
6	Hossein-Ali Mobasher	4 years
7	Naser Noamooz	3 years and 10 months
8	Mohammad Dadkan	3 years and 9 months
9	Ali Kani	3 years and 7 months

== Board members ==
As of 1 March 2025.

Position	Name
President	Mehdi Taj
General Secretary	Hamed Momeni (acting)
First Vice President	Mahdi Mohammadnabi
Second Vice President	Heydar Baharvand
Third Vice President and Women Section	Farideh Shojaei
Representative of Provincial Football Boards	Tahmoures Heydari
Representative of Provincial Football Boards	Ali Taheri
Representative of Club chairpersons	Ali Khatir
Representative of Club chairpersons	Mohammad Esfandiarpour
Board Member	Farzin Dabiri Oskuei
Board Member	Hojjat Karimi
Board Member	Mohammad-Rahman Salari

== National teams ==
- Iran national football team

Head coach: Amir Ghalenoei

- Iran national under-23 football team

Head coach: Hossein Abdi

- Iran national under-20 football team

Head coach: Ghasem Haddadifar

- Iran national under-17 football team

Head coach: Armaghan Ahmadi

- Iran national under-15 football team

Head coach: Ali Doustimehr

- Iran national futsal team

Head coach: Vahid Shamsaei

- Iran national under-20 futsal team

Head coach: Ali Sanei

- Iran national beach soccer team

Head coach: Ali Naderi

- Iran women's national football team

Head coach: Marziyeh Jafari

- Iran women's national under-23 football team

Head coach: TBD

- Iran women's national under-20 football team

Head coach: TBD

- Iran women's national under-17 football team

Head coach: Shadi Mahini

- Iran women's national futsal team

Head coach: Shahrzad Mozaffar
