= Beseri =

Coordinates: 6.265°N 100.200°E

- Mukim in Perlis

lain transcription(s)
  - Jawi: بيسري
  - Chinese: 柏斯里
  - Tamil: பெசரி
- Mukim Beseri
- Country: Malaysia
- state: Perlis

Population (2010)
  - Total: 13,485
  - Density: 199.8/km^{2} (517/sq mi)

Beseri is a mukim located in centre of Perlis, Malaysia. This mukim is administrated by Kangar Municipal Council. Beseri sub-district is divided into several villages and housing estates. The total area of Baseri is 67.5 km; in 2010 it was inhabited by 13,458 people.

The state constituency represented in the Perlis State Legislative Assembly is Beseri.

== Facilities ==
=== Education ===
- IKM Beseri
- Maktab Rendah Sains MARA Beseri

=== Places of worship ===
- Masjid Jamek Beseri
- Masjid Kampung Batu 15

=== Medical ===
- Klinik Desa Padang Malau
- Klinik Desa Padang Melangit
- Klinik Kesihatan Beseri

== Politics ==
Beseri' is a state constituency in Perlis, Malaysia, that has been represented in the Perlis State Legislative Assembly.

The state constituency was first contested in 1986 and is mandated to return a single member to the Perlis State Legislative Assembly under the first-past-the-post voting system. Since 2022, the State Assembly member for Beseri is Haziq Asyraf Dun from Perikatan Nasional (PN).

=== History ===
Members of the Legislative Assembly for Beseri
Assembly	Years	Member	Party
Constituency created from Titi Tinggi, Chuping and Paya
7th	1986–1990	Nordin Abdullah	BN (UMNO)
8th	1990–1995	Nordin Abdullah	BN (UMNO)
9th	1995–1999	Nordin Abdullah	BN (UMNO)
10th	1999–2004	Zahidi Zainul Abidin	BN (UMNO)
11th	2004–2008	Zahidi Zainul Abidin	BN (UMNO)
12th	2008–2013	Mat Rawi Kassim	BN (UMNO)
13th	2013–2018	Mat Rawi Kassim	BN (UMNO)
14th	2018–2022	Rouzaini Rais	BN (UMNO)
15th	2022–present	Haziq Asyraf Dun	PN (PAS)
