= Asma Ismail =

Malaysian academic

Yang Berbahagia Academician Professor Emerita Datuk Dr Asma binti Ismail, FASc PJN DSDK DPMP
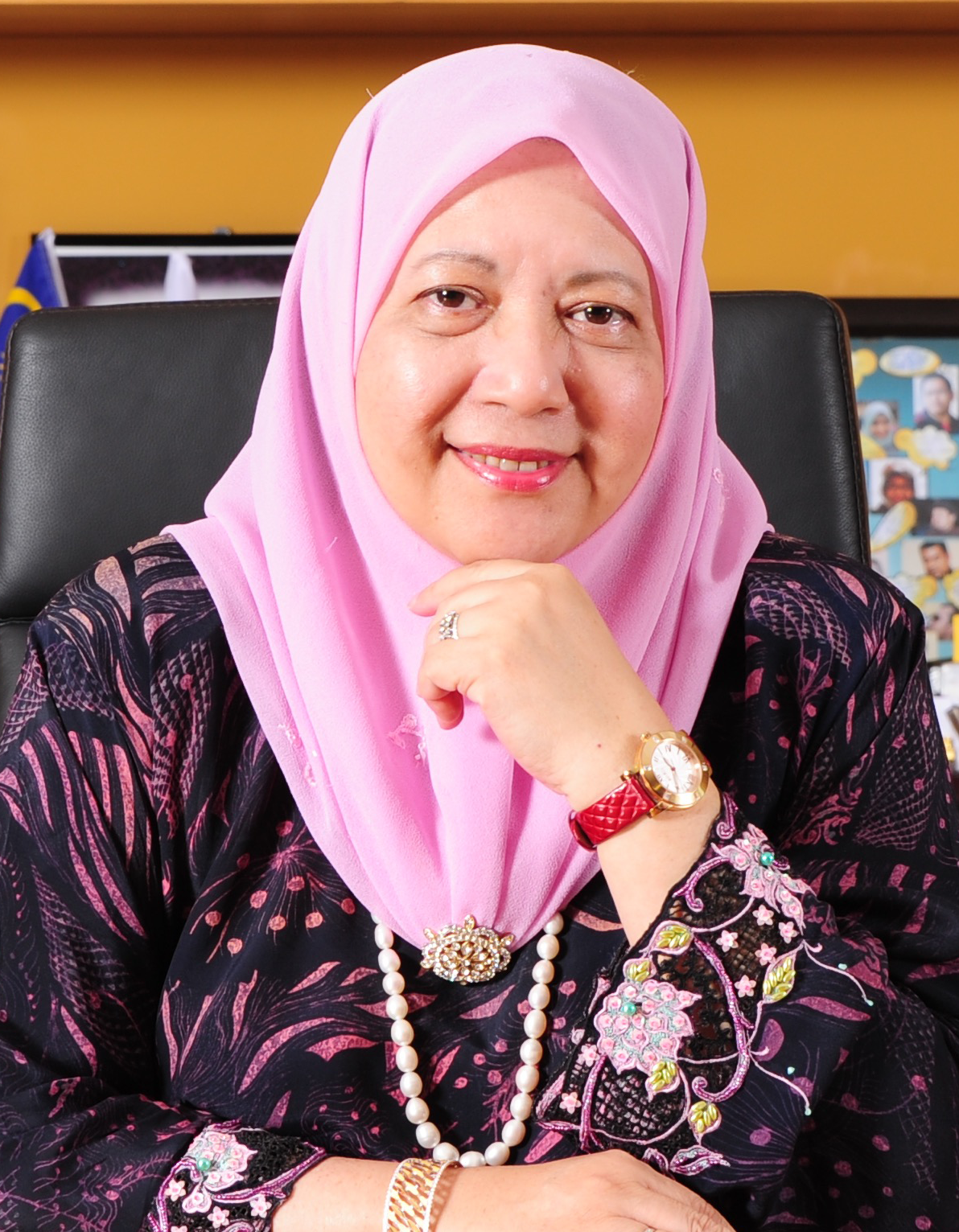

5th Director-General of Higher Education
- In office 1 June 2014 – 3 October 2016
- Monarch: Abdul Halim
- Prime Minister: Najib Razak
- Minister: Idris Jusoh
- Preceded by: Morshidi Sirat
- Succeeded by: Siti Hamisah Tapsir

Vice-Chancellor and CEO of the IMU University
- In office 1 August 2024 – Present
- Chancellor: Abu Bakar Suleiman
- Preceded by: Abdul Aziz Baba

Vice-Chancellor of the University of Science Malaysia
- In office 4 October 2016 – 2 October 2019
- Chancellor: Sirajuddin of Perlis
- Preceded by: Omar Osman
- Succeeded by: Faisal Rafiq Mahamd Adikan

Vice-Chancellor of the Universiti Sains Islam Malaysia
- In office 1 December 2012 – 31 May 2014
- Chancellor: Tuanku Aishah Rohani
- Preceded by: Muhamad Muda
- Succeeded by: Musa Ahmad

Personal details
- Born: Asma binti Ismail; 15 June 1958 (age 68) Jitra, Kedah, Malaysia
- Education: University of Nevada (BSc); Indiana University (MSc); University of Nevada (PhD)

Dr. Asma binti Ismail is a Malaysian academic and molecular biologist. She holds the Emerita Datuk title and is the first female vice-chancellor (VC) of Universiti Sains Malaysia (USM), appointed in 2016, as well as and the first female VC of Universiti Sains Islam Malaysia (USIM).

Asma is also the first female in Malaysia to hold several positions: Director-General of Higher Education; President of Academy of Sciences Malaysia (2016–2019); Chairperson of the Malaysian Qualifications Agency (MQA) (2019-2021); National Science Advisor to the Prime Minister. Additionally, she has been elected to the Academy of Sciences Malaysia (2003), the Academy of Sciences for the Developing World (2010), the Islamic World Academy of Sciences (2016), and the Iranian Academy of Medical Sciences (2017).

She has been appointed as the vice-chancellor and CEO of IMU University, as of 1 August 2024.

== Education ==
Ismail earned her degree in Biology from the University of Nevada, Reno. She then received her MA in Microbiology from Indiana University, Bloomington and a PhD in cellular and molecular biology from the University of Nevada, Reno in 1986.

== Career ==
=== University of Science Malaysia ===
Ismail started her career as a lecturer at the Department of Medical Microbiology and Parasitology, School of Medical Sciences, University of Science Malaysia in 1986. In 1989, she was appointed visiting scientist at Tokyo University and Visitor Fellow at Medical College, St Bartholomew Hospital in London in 1992. In 1993, she was promoted to associate professor and served as Deputy Dean of Administration in 1994. She was promoted to full professor in 2000 and was appointed Deputy Dean of Research.

During her tenure at USM, she has held numerous positions including Director of Center for Innovation and Technology Development, USM (2001); Founder Director, Molecular Medicine Research Institute (INFORM) (2003) and is the first woman in USM to hold the position of Deputy Vice-Chancellor (Research and Innovation).

=== Ministry of Higher Education and Beyond ===
Ismail became the Director-General of Higher Education at the Ministry of Higher Education Malaysia in 2014. She has played a vital role in progressing the higher education system including the establishment of the prestigious National Academic Award (Anugerah Akademik Negara), the establishment of Research Universities in Malaysia and in developing and implementing The Malaysian Education Blueprint (Higher Education) 2013 to 2025. She is currently involved in the rewriting of the Higher Education blueprint 2026 to 2035 and is a member of the Higher Education Advisory Panel for financial sustainability of universities under the Ministry of Higher Education (MOHE).

== Research ==
Ismail has worked on a rapid diagnostic test for typhoid called TYPHIDOT, which was advocated by WHO. She has published more 130 papers locally and abroad.

Ismail was elected to the Academy of Sciences Malaysia in 2003. She also was elected as a member at The Academy of Sciences for the Developing World in 2010 and The Islamic World Academy of Sciences in 2016. She was elected as Honorary Member of the Iranian Academy of Medical Sciences in 2017, and as a Member of the College of Fellows, Keele University in 2018. She was invited to become an Honourable member of International Board of Advisors, Chandigarh University, India and as a Governing Advisory Board Member for Ritsumeikan Asia Pacific University, Japan.

== Awards ==
Ismail was awarded as "Tokoh Akademik Negara" or National Academic Laureate in 2022, "Tokoh Maulidul Rasul" (national level) in 2019 and "Tokoh Srikandi" National Award (Academic) in 2018. Other awards and recognitions include National Young Scientist Award, National Innovation Award and was named in January 2023 by Forbes Asia magazine as among the Top 50 women over 50 from Asia Pacific that had reached new heights in contributing to the field of higher education, research and innovation as well as policy in the Science, Technology, Innovation and Economy locally and abroad and for inspiring the next generation.

She also received the Honorary Doctor of Science from the University of Glasgow (2013), the Thomas Hard Benton Mural Medallion by the Indiana University (2015), the Honorary Doctorate from Keele University and Honorary LLD from Kyoto University of Foreign Studies in 2017.

=== Honours of Malaysia ===
- Malaysia :
  - Commander of the Order of Meritorious Service (PJN) – Datuk (2016)
- Kedah :
  - Knight Companion of the Order of Loyalty to the Royal House of Kedah (DSDK) – Dato' (2013)
- Perlis :
  - Knight Commander of the Order of the Crown of Perlis (DPMP) – Dato' (2018)
