= Amir Abbas =

Malaysian physician

Yang Berbahagia Amir Abbas

Chancellor of the International Medical University
- In office 2013–2018
- Succeeded by: Gan Ee Kiang

President of the College of Physicians of Malaysia
- In office 1986–1988

Personal details
- Born: Amir bin Abbas
- Citizenship: Malaysian
- Occupation: Medical doctor

Amir bin Abbas is a Malaysian medical doctor and the current Chancellor of the International Medical University. He was Pro-Chancellor from 2011 to 2013 and later became Chancellor from 2013 to 2018.

He obtained his medical degree (MBBS) from the University of Malaya, Singapore in 1961. He received the MRCP in 1969 and became a Fellow of the Royal College of Physicians in 1983. He was head of the Health Research Department at the Institute of Medical Research (1969-1972) and Dean of the Faculty of Medicine at the National University of Malaysia (1972–1975), a member of the University Council 1987–1998 and a member of the council of the University of Malaya 1981–1987. He was also a board member at the UM University Hospital. He is managing director of Meditek Equipment Sdn. Bhd.

He has also served as Chairman of the Malaysian Medical Association of Selangor (1982–1985) and President of the College of Physicians of Malaysia (1986–1988). He was a member of the National Council for Scientific Research and Development (1981–1987).

== See also ==
- Malaysian university leaders
