= Abdul Rahman Mohamed Yassin =

Malaysian politician

Yang Berhormat Dato' Abdul Rahman Yassin DK II (Johor) SPMJ PIS JP
- عبد الرحمن ياسين
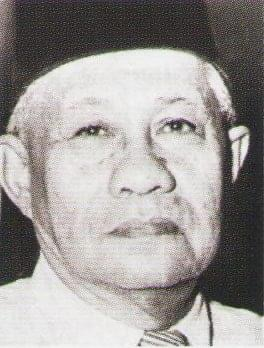

1st President of the Dewan Negara
- In office 11 September 1959 – 31 December 1968
- Monarchs: Abdul Rahman; Hisamuddin; Putra; Ismail Nasiruddin
- Prime Minister: Tunku Abdul Rahman
- Preceded by: Office established
- Succeeded by: Syed Sheh Syed Hassan Barakbah

Personal details
- Born: 1890 Parit Bakar, Muar, Johor
- Died: 24 May 1970 (aged 79–80) Johor Bahru, Johor, Malaysia
- Resting place: Mahmoodiah Royal Mausoleum
- Spouse(s): Zaharah Abu Bakar; Kamariah Jaafar; Ungku Salamah Ungku Abdul Rahman
- Relations: Onn Jaafar (brother-in-law); Awang Hassan (son-in-law); Abu Bakar Suleiman (grandson); Yahya Awang (grandson)
- Children: 9 (including Ismail Abdul Rahman and Suleiman Abdul Rahman)

Abdul Rahman bin Mohamed Yassin (1890 – 24 May 1970) was the 1st president of the Dewan Negara, serving from 1959 to 1968. His son, Ismail Abdul Rahman was the 2nd deputy prime minister of Malaysia (1970–1973).

== Awards and recognitions ==
=== Honours of Malaysia ===
- Johor
  - Silver Medal of the Sultan Ibrahim Medal (PIS II) (1930)
  - Knight Grand Commander of the Order of the Crown of Johor (SPMJ) – Dato' (1941)
  - Second Class of the Royal Family Order of Johor (DK II) (1967)

=== Places named after him ===
Several places were named after him, including:

- Kampung Dato' Abdul Rahman Yassin, a village in Kluang, Johor
- SK Abdul Rahman Yassin, a primary school in Kluang, Johor
- SMK Dato' Abdul Rahman Yassin, a secondary school in Johor Bahru, Johor

Political offices
First Office created	President of the Dewan Negara; 11 September 1959 – 31 December 1968	Succeeded by Syed Sheh Syed Hassan Barakbah
