= Peter Pook Chuen Keat =

Peter Pook Chuen Keat, sometimes rendered as Peter C.K. Pook, is a Malaysian pharmacologist. He is Professor of Pharmacology and Deputy Vice-Chancellor (i.e. Vice President) of the International Medical University in Kuala Lumpur.

== Biography ==
From 1983 to 1994, Peter Pook Chuen Keat was research scientist at the University of Bristol where he received a PhD in 1988 for his research on ligand binding and electrophysiological studies of excitatory amino acid receptors in the rat central nervous system, under the guidance of the organic chemist Jeffrey C. Watkins.

He was Reader in Neuropharmacology at the University of Sunderland from 1995 to 1998. He returned to Malaysia to become Professor of Pharmacology at the Universiti Putra Malaysia in 1998. Since 2001 he has been Professor of Pharmacology at the International Medical University, in 2013 he became Vice President of the university. Since 2016 he is Deputy Vice-Chancellor.
