= Suleiman Abdul Rahman =

Malaysian politician

Yang Berhormat Tan Sri Dato' Suleiman Abdul Rahman PMN SPMJ
- سليمان عبد الرحمن
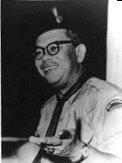

3rd Malaysian High Commissioner to Australia
- In office 1961–1963
- Monarch: Putra
- Prime Minister: Tunku Abdul Rahman
- Preceded by: Gunn Lay Teik
- Succeeded by: Lim Yew Hock

Ministerial roles
- 1955–1957: Minister of Local Government, Housing and Town Planning
- 1957–1959: Minister of Interior and Justice
- 1959–1961: Minister of the Interior

Member of the Malaysian Parliament for Muar Selatan
- In office 11 September 1959 – 6 November 1963
- Preceded by: Constituency established
- Succeeded by: Awang Hassan

Personal details
- Born: 27 February 1912 Johor Bahru, Johor, Unfederated Malay States, British Malaya
- Died: 6 November 1963 (aged 51) Melbourne, Victoria, Australia
- Resting place: Mahmoodiah Royal Mausoleum
- Party: United Malays National Organisation
- Relations: Ismail Abdul Rahman (brother); Awang Hassan (brother-in-law); Yahya Awang (nephew)
- Children: Abu Bakar Suleiman
- Parents: Abdul Rahman Mohamed Yassin (father); Zaharah Abu Bakar (mother)
- Education: Queens' College, Cambridge

Suleiman bin Abdul Rahman (27 February 1912 – 6 November 1963) was a Malaysian politician who served as Minister of the Interior (1959–1961) and Malaysian High Commissioner to Australia from 1961 until his death on 6 November 1963. He was the eldest son of Abdul Rahman Mohamed Yassin, 1st President of the Dewan Negara (1959–1968) and the brother of Ismail Abdul Rahman, 2nd Deputy Prime Minister of Malaysia (1970–1973).

== Awards and recognitions ==
=== Honours of Malaya ===
- Malaya
  - Commander of the Order of the Defender of the Realm (PMN) – Tan Sri, formerly Dato' (1959)
- Johor
  - Knight Grand Commander of the Order of the Crown of Johor (SPMJ) – Dato' (1960)

=== Places named after him ===
Several places were named after him, including:

- Kampung Dato' Sulaiman Menteri, a village in Johor Bahru, Johor
- Jalan Dato' Sulaiman, a street in Johor Bahru, Johor
- SMK Dato' Sulaiman, a secondary school in Parit Sulong, Batu Pahat, Johor
- Jalan Datuk Sulaiman, Taman Tun Dr. Ismail, Kuala Lumpur

Political offices
Preceded by Tunku Abdul Rahman	Minister of Interior and Justice; 1957 – 1959	Succeeded by Leong Yew Koh
Preceded by Himself	Minister of the Interior; 1959 – 1961	Succeeded by Ismail Abdul Rahman
Preceded by Gunn Lay Teik	Malaysian High Commissioner to Australia; 1961 – 1963	Succeeded by Lim Yew Hock
