= Hla Yee Yee =

Burmese physiologist

Prof. Dr. Hla Yee Yee
- လှရီရီ

Director of the International Medical University Centre for Medical Education
- In office 2006–2009
- Succeeded by: Victor Lim

Personal details
- Born: 29 May 1946 Sagaing, Myanmar
- Education: MBBS (Rgn), MSc (Mdy), PhD (Lond), FRCP (hon) (Edin), Cert. in Leadership for Physician Educators
- Alma mater: Institute of Medicine 1, Rangoon
- Occupation: Physician educator
- Known for: trainer of medical education workshops in Malaysia & Myanmar; contributions to health professions education reform in Myanmar Writing articles, poems, songs on Burma( pseudonym - Zeyarthu)

Hla Yee Yee (Burmese: လှရီရီ; born 1946) is a Burmese physiologist and Honorary Professor of Medical Education at the Defence Services Medical Academy in Yangon. She formerly was Professor of Physiology at the International Medical University in Kuala Lumpur from 1999 to 2015, and Director of the IMU Medical Education and Research Unit, renamed the Centre for Medical Education during her tenure. She taught at the University of Medicine 1, Yangon from 1969 to 1995. Hla Yee Yee is also noted as a writer and poet.

She graduated with a Bachelor of Medicine, Bachelor of Surgery degree at the Institute of Medicine 1, Rangoon in 1968, then received a master's degree in physiology from the University of Medicine, Mandalay in 1972 and a PhD in physiology from Charing Cross and Westminster Medical School in 1989. She has been President of the Myanmar Physiology and Biochemistry Society.

She is a daughter of the Burmese civil servant Ba Htay, who chaired the Multi-Party Democracy General Election Commission which organized the 1990 elections.
