= Kew Siang Tong =

Mr Ajaharul Ahmed 505

Yang Berbahagia Professor Dato' Kew Siang Tong DPMP DSSA JMN JSD KMN PCM SAP

Personal details
- Occupation: Physician

Dato' Kew Siang Tong, also rendered as Siang Tong Kew, is a Malaysian physician, academic administrator and health bureaucrat.

She is currently Professor in Internal Medicine and was the former Dean of the School of Medicine at the International Medical University in Kuala Lumpur. She has formerly been Head of Gastroenterology at Kuala Lumpur Hospital and worked in the Ministry of Health from 1999 to 2002. She has been Master of the Academy of Medicine of Malaysia, President of the College of Physicians and President of the Malaysian Society of Gastroenterology and Hepatology.

She completed her studies in medicine at the University of Singapore in 1969. She became a Fellow of the Royal College of Physicians of Edinburgh in 1996 and of the Royal College of Physicians and Surgeons of Glasgow in the same year. She also became a Fellow of the Academy of Medicine of Malaysia in 1996, an Honorary Fellow of the American College of Physicians in 1997, an Honorary Fellow of the Royal Australasian College of Physicians in 1997, a Fellow of the Academy of Medicine, Singapore in 2004 and a Fellow of the Royal College of Physicians of Ireland in 2004.

== Honours ==
- Malaysia
  - Officer of the Order of the Defender of the Realm (KMN) (1982)
  - Companion of the Order of Loyalty to the Royal Family of Malaysia (JSD) (1984)
  - Companion of the Order of the Defender of the Realm (JMN) (1999)
- Pahang
  - Companion of the Order of Sultan Ahmad Shah of Pahang (SAP)
- Perak
  - Commander of the Order of Cura Si Manja Kini (PCM) (1986)
  - Knight Commander of the Order of the Perak State Crown (DPMP) – Dato' (1989)
- Selangor
  - Knight Companion of the Order of Sultan Salahuddin Abdul Aziz Shah (DSSA) – Datin Paduka (1992)
