= Gan Ee Kiang =

Malaysian pharmacologist

Yang Berbahagia Dato' Gan Ee Kiang

Personal details
- Born: 23 June 1944 (age 81) Alma, Bukit Mertajam, Penang, Japanese Malaysia (now Malaysia)
- Occupation: Pharmacologist

Gan Ee Kiang (born 23 June 1944) is a Malaysian pharmacologist. He is Professor of Pharmacology at the University of Science, Malaysia, and currently holds the honorary office of Chancellor of the International Medical University in Kuala Lumpur.

He joined the University of Science in 1977 and was Dean of School of Pharmaceutical Sciences from 1979 to 1995. He has also served as an adviser to the World Health Organization. From 1999 to 2013 he was Managing Director of the USAINS Group, the commercial arm of the University of Science. He is a member of the Board of Directors of several companies.

He earned a PhD in Pharmacology at the University of Western Australia in 1972 under the supervision of Mary Fauriel Lockett, the first female professor in Australia.

== Honours ==
- Pingat Kelakuan Terpuji (PKT, 1986), state award of Penang
- Bintang Cemerlang Negeri (BCN, 1997), state award of Penang
- Darjah Setia Pangkuan Negeri (DSPN, 2004), state award of Penang
- Johan Mangku Negara (JMN, 1999), Malaysian federal award
