= Ba Htay =

Burmese scouting pioneer (1906–2000)

- U Ba Htay
- Born: 1906; Sagaing, British Burma
- Died: 14 October 2000 (aged 93–94); Lanmadaw Township, Rangoon, Burma
- Known for: Chairman of the Multi-Party Democracy General Election Commission; Pioneer of the Scouting movement in Burma; Indian Civil Service (ICS)
- Spouse: Daw Mya Tin
- Children: Tin Win; Khin Thin Si Si; Hla Yee Yee; Khin Aye Aye; Khin Pyone Pyone; Khin Hla Hla
- Parent(s): U Htwe; Daw Lay Khin
- Awards: Thiripyanchi; Sithu; Thraysithu

Ba Htay (Burmese: ဘဌေး, pronounced [ba̰ tʰé]) was a Burmese businessman, administrator, the Chairman of the Multi-Party Democracy General Election Commission and one of the pioneers of the now-extinct Scouting movement in Burma.

== Biography ==
He was the eldest of three sons. He was born to well-known lumber merchants and builders in Sagaing, and his wife, Daw Lay Khin of Pekadoe Village in Sagaing in 1906.

Ba Htay represented the Union of Burma Boy Scouts and was elected one of the very earliest chairmen of the five-man Far East Scout Advisory Committee (FESAC), which would later become the Asia-Pacific Region, and served from 1958 to 1960.

Ba Htay started his career as a tutor at Rangoon University, for a brief period. He later became Indian Civil Service (ICS), and was referred to as ICS U Ba Htay, one of very few elite administrators in the government. He held such posts as Commissioner of Settlement and Land Records, Financial Commissioner, and Chairman of Burmah Oil Company, when the government took over 51% of the shares from the BOC.

== Retirement ==
After retirement in 1963, he was brought back into public life as the Multi-Party Democracy General Election Commission in 1988, after nationwide protests included demands for a free and fair election. Election was held in Burma (Myanmar) on 27 May 1990 and Aung San Suu Kyi's National League for Democracy (NLD) won by landslide.
