= Victor Lim =

Malaysian physician and microbiologist

Victor Lim FRCPath FAMM FASc

Pro Vice-Chancellor (Vice-President) of the International Medical University
- Incumbent
- Assumed office 2011

Director of the IMU Centre for Education
- In office 2009–2015
- Preceded by: Hla Yee Yee
- Succeeded by: Abdul Aziz Baba

Executive Dean of the International Medical University
- In office 2004–2011

Personal details
- Occupation: Physician

Victor Lim Kok Eow (also rendered Victor K.E. Lim) is a Malaysian physician and microbiologist, specializing on antimicrobial resistance and infectious diseases. He is Professor of Pathology and Pro Vice-Chancellor (formerly called Vice-President) of the International Medical University in Kuala Lumpur. He is also a member of its Board of Governors.

== Career ==
Lim obtained his medical degree (MB BS) at the University of Malaya in 1974. He then obtained an MSc in Medical Microbiology from the University of London in 1978, and passed the Royal College of Pathologists examination (MRCPath) in 1981.

He was a Professor of Microbiology and Deputy Dean at the Faculty of Medicine of the National University of Malaysia and Director of the Infectious Diseases Research Centre at the Institute for Medical Research in Kuala Lumpur. After joining the International Medical University (IMU) as a Professor of Pathology, he has been a member of the university's senior management committee as Executive Dean from 2004 to 2011, as Vice President for Education from 2011 and, following a change in senior management titles, as Pro Vice-Chancellor from 2016. He was also Director of the IMU Centre for Education from 2009 to 2015. He is still actively involved in teaching for Doctor of Pathology (Clinical Microbiology) students in National University Of Malaysia.

He has served as President of the Western Pacific Society of Chemotherapy (2004–2008), was the Master of the Academy of Medicine of Malaysia (2008–2011) and the President of the Malaysian Society for Infectious Diseases and Chemotherapy (1999–2003). Lim is a Fellow of the Royal College of Pathologists, a Fellow of the Academy of Medicine of Malaysia, a Fellow of the Academy of Medicine of Singapore and a Fellow of the Academy of Sciences of Malaysia. He was Editor-in-Chief of the Malaysian Medical Journal 1991–1998. He is also a member of several governmental committees, including the National Antibiotic and Infection Control Committee and the National Medical Testing Accreditation Committee. In addition to antimicrobial resistance and infectious diseases, he is involved in research on medical education.

== Personal life ==
Victor Lim is the 2nd of 3 children. He is flanked by his elder sister Ivy Lim, and the late Dr Albert Lim who is an Oncologist. He is married to Professor Dr. Asma Omar, a Professor of Paediatric Cardiology at the University of Malaya.
