= Kamal Salih =

Malaysian university president (1966–2025)

Yang Berbahagia Tan Sri Kamal Salih PSM DSPN JMN KMN

President of the International Medical University (IMU)
- In office 1993–2001
- Succeeded by: Abu Bakar Suleiman

Member of the Malaysian Parliament for Wangsa Maju
- In office 25 April 1995 – 29 November 1999
- Preceded by: Position established
- Succeeded by: Zulhasnan Rafique (BN–UMNO)
- Majority: 27,894 (1995)

Personal details
- Born: Kamal bin Salih; 1946
- Died: 6 March 2025 (aged 78–79) Southville City, Dengkil, Selangor, Malaysia
- Citizenship: Malaysian
- Party: United Malays National Organisation (UMNO)
- Other political affiliations: Barisan Nasional (BN)
- Education: Monash University & University of Pennsylvania
- Occupation: Policy advisor; academic administrator; politician
- Profession: Economist; physician
- Known for: Co-founding the International Medical University (IMU)

Kamal bin Mat Salih (1946 – 6 March 2025) was a Malaysian economist, physician, policy advisor, academic administrator and politician. He served as the Member of Parliament (MP) for Wangsa Maju from April 1995 to November 1999. He was a member of the United Malays National Organisation (UMNO), a component party of the Barisan Nasional (BN) coalition.

He earned B.A. (Hons) from Monash University and a PhD from the University of Pennsylvania in 1973. He was a professor, dean and deputy vice-chancellor at the University of Science, Malaysia between 1973 and 1985. From 1986 to 1994, he was executive director of the Malaysian Institute of Economic Research. He also served as a member of the Prime Minister's Economic Panel in 1981–1986, advising Prime Minister Mahathir Mohamad. He was also a member of the Malaysian Business Council 1991–1996 and was rapporteur-general of the first National Economic Consultative Council 1989–1991.

He co-founded the International Medical University (IMU) in 1993 and served as its first president until 2001 and as executive chairman until 2003. After leaving IMU, he served as economic advisor to the National Implementation Task Force, a high-level group of experts established by the government of Abdullah Ahmad Badawi. He is now professor of economics and development studies at the University of Malaya.

== Election results ==
Parliament of Malaysia
Year	Constituency	Candidate	Votes	Pct	Opponent(s)	Votes	Pct	Ballots cast	Majority	Turnout
1995	P105 Wangsa Maju	Kamal Salih (UMNO)	35,884	81.79%	Aliah Nani (S46)	7,990	18.21%	48,725	27,894	74.73%

== Honours ==
=== Honours of Malaysia ===
- Malaysia :
  - Commander of the Order of Loyalty to the Crown of Malaysia (PSM) – Tan Sri (2008)
  - Companion of the Order of the Defender of the Realm (JMN) (1984)
  - Officer of the Order of the Defender of the Realm (KMN) (1980)
- Penang :
  - Officer of the Order of the Defender of State (DSPN) – Dato' (1986)

=== Academic awards ===
- D.Litt (Hon), Dundee
- D.Laws, honoris causa, Dalhousie
- D.Science (Hon), Thomas Jefferson
- D.Science (Hon), Strathclyde
