= Muar Selatan (federal constituency) =

Johor constituency

Defunct federal constituency
- Legislature: Dewan Rakyat
- Constituency created: 1955
- Constituency abolished: 1974
- First contested: 1955
- Last contested: 1969

Muar Selatan was a federal constituency in Johor, Malaysia, that was represented in the Dewan Rakyat from 1955 to 1974.

The federal constituency was created in the 1974 redistribution and was mandated to return a single member to the Dewan Rakyat under the first past the post voting system.

== History ==
It was abolished in 1974 when it was redistributed.

=== Representation history ===
Members of Parliament for Muar Selatan
Parliament	No	Years	Member	Party	Vote Share
Constituency created
Federal Legislative Council
1st		1955-1959	Tan Suan Kok (陈宣国）	Alliance (MCA)	23,580; 5.16%
Parliament of the Federation of Malaya
1st	P092	1959-1963	Sulaiman Abdul Rahman (سليمان عبدالرحمن)	Alliance (UMNO)	14,795; 76.37%
Parliament of Malaysia
1st	P092	1963	Sulaiman Abdul Rahman (سليمان عبدالرحمن)	Alliance (UMNO)	14,795; 76.37%
1st	P092	1963-1964	Awang Hassan (اواڠ حسن)	Alliance (UMNO)	17,104; 86.82%
2nd	P092	1964-1969	Awang Hassan (اواڠ حسن)	Alliance (UMNO)	Uncontested
		1969-1971	Parliament was suspended		
3rd	P092	1971-1973	Awang Hassan (اواڠ حسن)	Alliance (UMNO)	Uncontested
3rd	P092	1973-1974	Awang Hassan (اواڠ حسن)	BN (UMNO)	Uncontested
Constituency abolished, split into Muar, Ayer Hitam and Semerah

=== State constituency ===
Parliamentary constituency	State constituency						
Parliamentary constituency	1954–59*	1959–1974	1974–1986	1986–1995	1995–2004	2004–2018	2018–present
Muar Selatan	Batu Pahat Inland						
Muar Selatan	Muar Coastal						
Muar Selatan		Parit Jawa					
Muar Selatan		Simpang Kiri					

=== Historical boundaries ===
State Constituency	Area
State Constituency	1959
Parit Jawa	Bukit Mor; Parit Jawa; Parit Jamil; Semerah; Sungai Balang
Simpang Kiri	Bagan; Bukit Naning; Kangkar Senagar; Parit Sulong; Seri Medan

== Election results ==
Malaysian general election, 1969
Party	Candidate	Votes	%	∆%
On the nomination day, Awang Hassan won uncontested.
Alliance	Awang Hassan			
Total valid votes			100.00	
Total rejected ballots				
Unreturned ballots				
Turnout				
Registered electors		34,963		
Majority				
Alliance hold		Swing		

Malaysian general election, 1964
Party	Candidate	Votes	%	∆%
On the nomination day, Awang Hassan won uncontested.
Alliance	Awang Hassan			
Total valid votes			100.00	
Total rejected ballots				
Unreturned ballots				
Turnout				
Registered electors		30,123		
Majority				
Alliance hold		Swing		

Malaysian general by-election, 28 December 1963 Upon the death of incumbent, Suleiman Abdul Rahman
Party	Candidate	Votes	%	∆%
Alliance	Awang Hassan	17,104	86.82	▲10.45
PMIP	Hashim Israkal	2,597	13.18	▲0.23
Total valid votes		19,701	100.00	
Total rejected ballots				
Unreturned ballots				
Turnout				
Registered electors		30,128		
Majority		14,507	73.64	▲10.22
Alliance hold		Swing		

Malayan general election, 1959
Party	Candidate	Votes	%	∆%
Alliance	Suleiman Abdul Rahman	14,795	76.37	▼8.79
PMIP	Mohamed Tahir Daing Mengati	2,508	12.95	▲12.95
National Party	Raja Hashim Mahmood	2,069	10.68	▼4.16
Total valid votes		19,372	100.00	
Total rejected ballots		262		
Unreturned ballots		0		
Turnout		19,634	76.38	▼5.52
Registered electors		25,706		
Majority		12,287	63.42	▼6.90
Alliance hold		Swing		

Malayan general election, 1955
Party	Candidate	Votes	%
Alliance	Tan Suan Kok	23,580	85.16
NEGARA	Mahmud Mohd Shah	4,108	14.84
Total valid votes		27,688	100.00
Total rejected ballots			
Unreturned ballots			
Turnout		27,688	81.90
Registered electors		33,807	
Majority		19,472	70.32
This was a new constituency created.
Source(s): The Straits Times.
