= Abu Bakar Suleiman =

Malaysian physician (born 1944)

Yang Berbahagia Tan Sri Abu Bakar Suleiman PSM DPMJ SMJ JMN AMN
- أبو بكر سوكيمان

Chairman of the IMU Group
- Incumbent
- Assumed office 2018

Chairman of IHH Healthcare
- In office 2011–2017

President of the International Medical University (IMU)
- In office 2001–2017
- Preceded by: Kamal Salih
- Succeeded by: Abdul Aziz Baba

Director-General of Health of Malaysia
- In office 1991–1999
- Preceded by: Abdullah Abdul Rahman
- Succeeded by: Mohamad Taha Arif

President of the Malaysian Medical Association
- In office 1986–1988

Personal details
- Born: 4 February 1944 (age 82) Johor Bahru, Johor, Japanese occupation of Malaya (now Malaysia)
- Relations: Abdul Rahman Mohamed Yassin (grandfather); Ismail Abdul Rahman (uncle); Awang Hassan (uncle); Yahya Awang (cousin)
- Parent(s): Suleiman Abdul Rahman; Fatum Abdul Majid
- Education: Monash University (MBBS)
- Occupation: Physician

Abu Bakar bin Suleiman (born 4 February 1944) is a Malaysian physician, academic administrator, business executive and former civil servant. He is currently the Emeritus President of IMU Health Sdn Bhd, the parent company of the International Medical University in Kuala Lumpur. He served as vice-chancellor (president) of the International Medical University from 2001 to 2015. He was the chairman of IHH Healthcare, Asia's largest private healthcare group from 2011 to 2017.

From 1991 to 1999, Abu Bakar served as Director-General in the Malaysian Ministry of Health. He is president of a range of national medical organisations namely the Malaysian Health Informatics Association, the National Kidney Foundation and the Association of Private Hospitals of Malaysia.

Abu Bakar holds a Bachelor of a Medicine and a Bachelor of Surgery from Monash University, from which he graduated in 1968. He also formerly served as president of the Malaysian Medical Association from 1986 to 1988.

in 2024, Abu Bakar received the Merdeka Award for Health, Science and Technology category

== Honours ==
=== Honours of Malaysia ===
- Malaysia :
  - Commander of the Order of Loyalty to the Crown of Malaysia (PSM) – Tan Sri (1993)
  - Companion of the Order of the Defender of the Realm (JMN) (1990)
  - Member of the Order of the Defender of the Realm (AMN) (1983)
- Johor :
  - Knight Commander of the Order of the Crown of Johor (DPMJ) – Dato' (1988)
  - Companion of the Order of the Crown of Johor (SMJ) (1986)
