= Ong Kok Hai =

Malaysian microbiologist (1945–2026)

Ong Kok Hai (12 November 1945 – 2 March 2026) was a Malaysian microbiologist and Professor of Microbiology at the International Medical University. He was one of the founders of the International Medical University in 1992 and also played a major role in the establishment of the medical schools at the University of Science, Malaysia in 1979 and at the National University of Malaysia. Ong was involved in typhoid research, and in 1995 he co-founded the medical biotechnology company Malaysian Bio-Diagnostics Research Sdn Bhd (MBDr), which develops a rapid diagnostic test for typhoid fever used in many typhoid endemic countries.

Ong was born in Penang on 12 November 1945. He held a BSc (Hons) in microbiology from the University of Guelph in Canada (1969) and a PhD in medical microbiology from the University of Manchester in the United Kingdom (1977). He lectured at the National University of Malaysia from 1977, before joining the University of Science to start its medical school in 1979.

His later research focused on enteric fever and on a rapid antigen detection test for brugia malayi.

Ong died on 2 March 2026, at the age of 80.

== Honours ==
- Honorary Member of Malaysian Invention and Design Society (2013)
