= List of high commissioners of Malaysia to Australia =

Coordinates: 35.304460°S 149.113440°E

High Commissioner of Malaysia to Australia
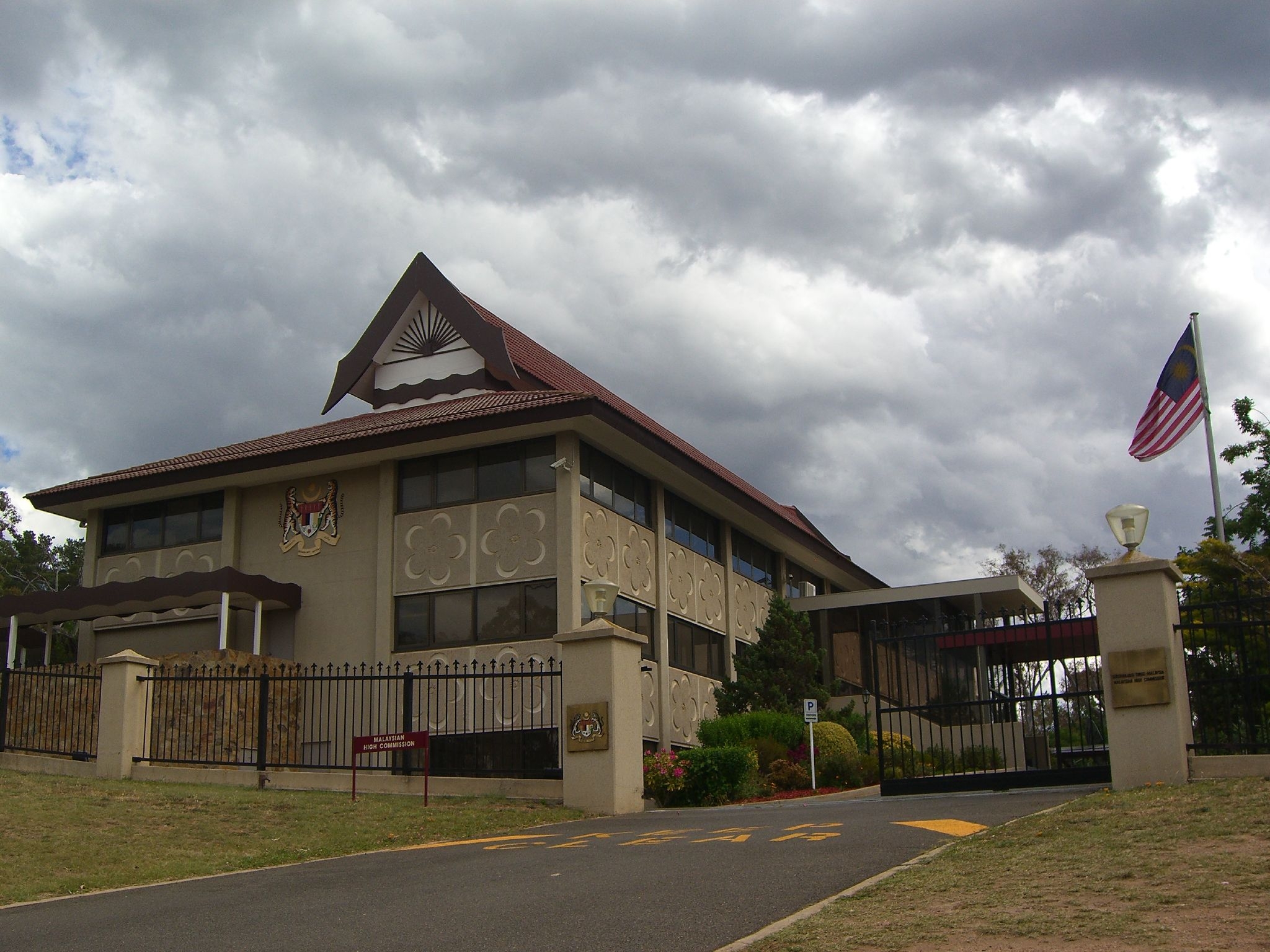
- Incumbent; Sharrina Abdullah since 28 Oktober 2023
- Style: His Excellency
- Seat: Canberra, Australia
- Appointer: Yang di-Pertuan Agong
- Inaugural holder: Nik Ahmad Kamil Nik Mahmud
- Formation: August 1956
- Website: www.kln.gov.my/web/aus_canberra/home

The high commissioner of Malaysia to the Commonwealth of Australia is the head of Malaysia's diplomatic mission to Australia. The position has the rank and status of an ambassador extraordinary and plenipotentiary and is based in the High Commission of Malaysia, Canberra.

== List of heads of mission ==
=== High commissioners to Australia ===
| High Commissioner | Term start | Term end |
|---|---|---|
| Nik Ahmad Kamil Nik Mahmud | 1956 | 1957 |
| Gunn Lay Teik | 1957 | 1960 |
| Suleiman Abdul Rahman | 1961 | 1963 |
| Lim Yew Hock | 1964 | 1966 |
| Mohamed Baba | 1966 | 1968 |
| Fuad Stephens | 1968 | 1973 |
| Awang Hassan | 1973 | 1980 |
| Lim Taik Choon | 1981 | 1985 |
| Zakaria Mohd Ali | 1985 | 1989 |
| Abdul Karim Marzuki | 1989 | 1992 |
| Zainal Abidin Ibrahim | 1992 | 1996 |
| Adnan Othman | 1996 | 2001 |
| Mohd Arshad M. Hussain | 2001 | 2003 |
| Md. Hussin Nayan | 2003 | 2005 |
| Salim Hashim | 2005 | 2007 |
| Salman Ahmad | 2009 | 2011 |
| Zainal Abidin Ahmad | 2013 | 2017 |
| Sudha Devi K.R. Vasudevan | 2017 | 2019 |
| Roslan Bin Tan Sri Abdul Rahman | 2021 | 2023 |
| Sharrina Abdullah | 2023 | Incumbent |

== See also ==
- Australia–Malaysia relations
