= Abdul Aziz Baba =

Malaysian physician and haematologist

Prof Dr Abdul Aziz Baba MBBS (Melb), MRCP (UK), MRCP (Ireland), FRCP (Edin), AM

Vice-Chancellor of the International Medical University (IMU)
- In office 2016–2024
- Preceded by: Abu Bakar Suleiman

Director of the IMU Centre for Education
- In office 2015–2015
- Preceded by: Victor Lim

Vice-President of the International Medical University
- In office 2013–2015

Personal details
- Born: Abdul Aziz bin Baba
- Citizenship: Malaysian
- Occupation: Medical doctor

Professor Abdul Aziz bin Baba is a Malaysian medical doctor, haematologist and academic administrator. He is the former Vice-Chancellor (CEO) of the International Medical University (IMU), from 1 January 2016 to 31 July 2024.

== Career ==
He attended medical school at the University of Melbourne and graduated in 1979. He joined the Universiti Sains Malaysia in 1986, became Professor in 2000 and was Dean of the School of Medical Sciences 2005–2012.

He joined the International Medical University as a professor of medicine in 2013 and became a member of the university's senior management committee as vice-president with the responsibility for the medical and dental programmes in the same year. He also served as Director of the IMU Centre for Education (ICE) in 2015. In 2016 he succeeded Abu Bakar Suleiman as Vice-Chancellor (previously known as president), i.e. as the university's effective head.

He has been President of the Malaysian Society of Haematology, Chairman of the National Conjoint Board for Postgraduate Medical Programmes, Chairman of Specialist Advisory Committee (Clinical Haematology) of the National Specialist Register and a member of the Malaysian Medical Council.
