= Australia–Malaysia relations =

- Australia: Malaysia

Diplomatic mission
- Australian High Commission in Malaysia: Malaysian High Commission, Canberra

Envoy
- High Commissioner: High Commissioner

Foreign relations exist between Australia and Malaysia. Australia has a high commission in Kuala Lumpur, and Malaysia has a high commission in Canberra. Both Australia and Malaysia are members of the Five Power Defence Arrangements and often participate in military exercises together.

Occasional issues such as perceived Australian influence in Southeast Asian affairs, as well as the detention and execution of Australian citizens in Malaysia, further complicate relations between the two nations.

In 2025, Australia celebrates 70 years of Australia's diplomatic presence in Malaysia.

== History ==
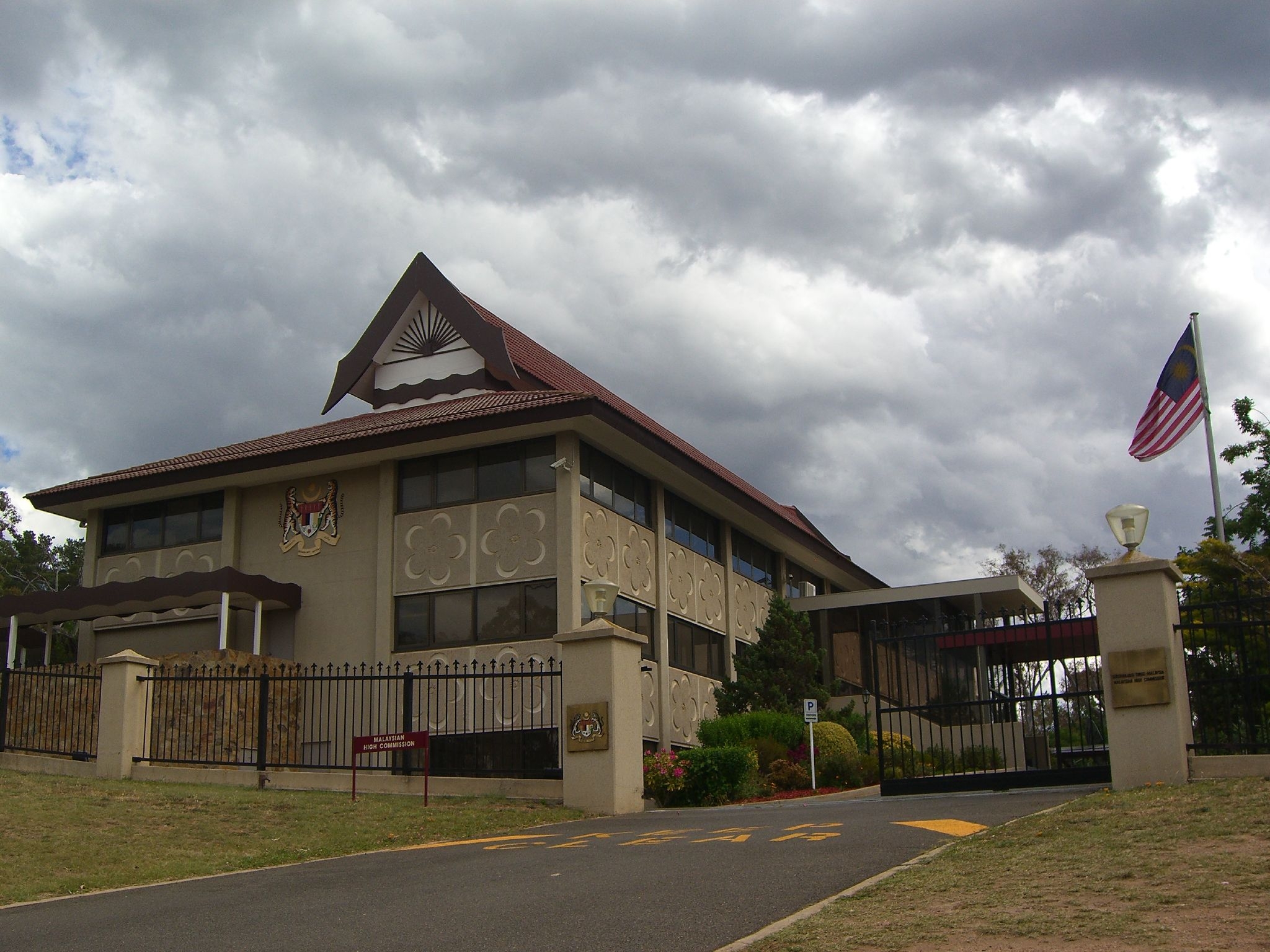
High Commission of Malaysia in Canberra, Australia.

The two countries have a long-standing institutional history and more people-to-people ties than any other Asian neighbour. Links between Australia and Malaysia can be traced to the 18th century, when the Malays participated in the pearling industry off Australia's north coast in the 19th century where their descendants today form an integral part of Darwin’s multicultural society. During World War II, Australian troops were involved in the Malayan Campaign where many of its surviving troops were captured by the Japanese Army and sent to Borneo in Batu Lintang camp and Sandakan camp where they were also forced to participate in death marches, which resulted in the deaths of many Australian prisoners of war with only six of them surviving to see the war ended and subsequent liberation of the Borneo Island by Australian reinforcements. Since then, Australian troops also involved in the Malayan War against the Communists, notably the Malayan Emergency and Second Malayan Emergency where they providing materials and equipments to Malayan security forces, as well in the Malaysia's operation against the Sarawak Communist Insurgency and Indonesia's military infiltration towards its soil prior to the formation of a larger federation that includes North Borneo and Sarawak. The formal relations between the two modern countries started in 1955.

== Economic relations ==
Malaysia is Australia's 10th largest trading partner, with two-way trade worth A$19.2 billion in 2013. The two countries commenced a free trade agreement in January 2013. Major Australian exports to Malaysia include coal, aluminium, copper, crude oil, wheat and sugar, medication, zinc, dairy products, machinery and transport equipment, ferrous waste and scrap, while major Malaysian exports to Australia including crude oil, refined petroleum, chemicals, fats and oils, computer, TVs, radios, telecom equipment and electronic integrated circuits, furniture, mattress and cushions as well machinery and transport equipment.

In response to the 2026 Iran war, Malaysian Prime Minister Anwar Ibrahim and Australian Prime Minister Anthony Albanese signed a mutual trade agreement on 16 April. The Malaysian oil and gas company Petronas agreed to supply Australia with excess fuel in return for Australia prioritising its liquefied natural gas exports to Malaysia.

Monthly value of Australian merchandise exports to Malaysia (A$ millions) since 1988.

Monthly value of Malaysian merchandise exports to Australia (A$ millions) since 1988.

== Education relations ==
Australia has established four university campuses in Malaysia. Two campuses are located in Sarawak, East Malaysia: Curtin University and Swinburne University; while the other two campuses are located in Selangor, Peninsular Malaysia: Monash University and UOW Malaysia. Through these campuses, more than 23,000 Malaysians enrolled in Australian institutions. Meanwhile, more than 300,000 Malaysian students have also studied in Australia.

== Official visits ==
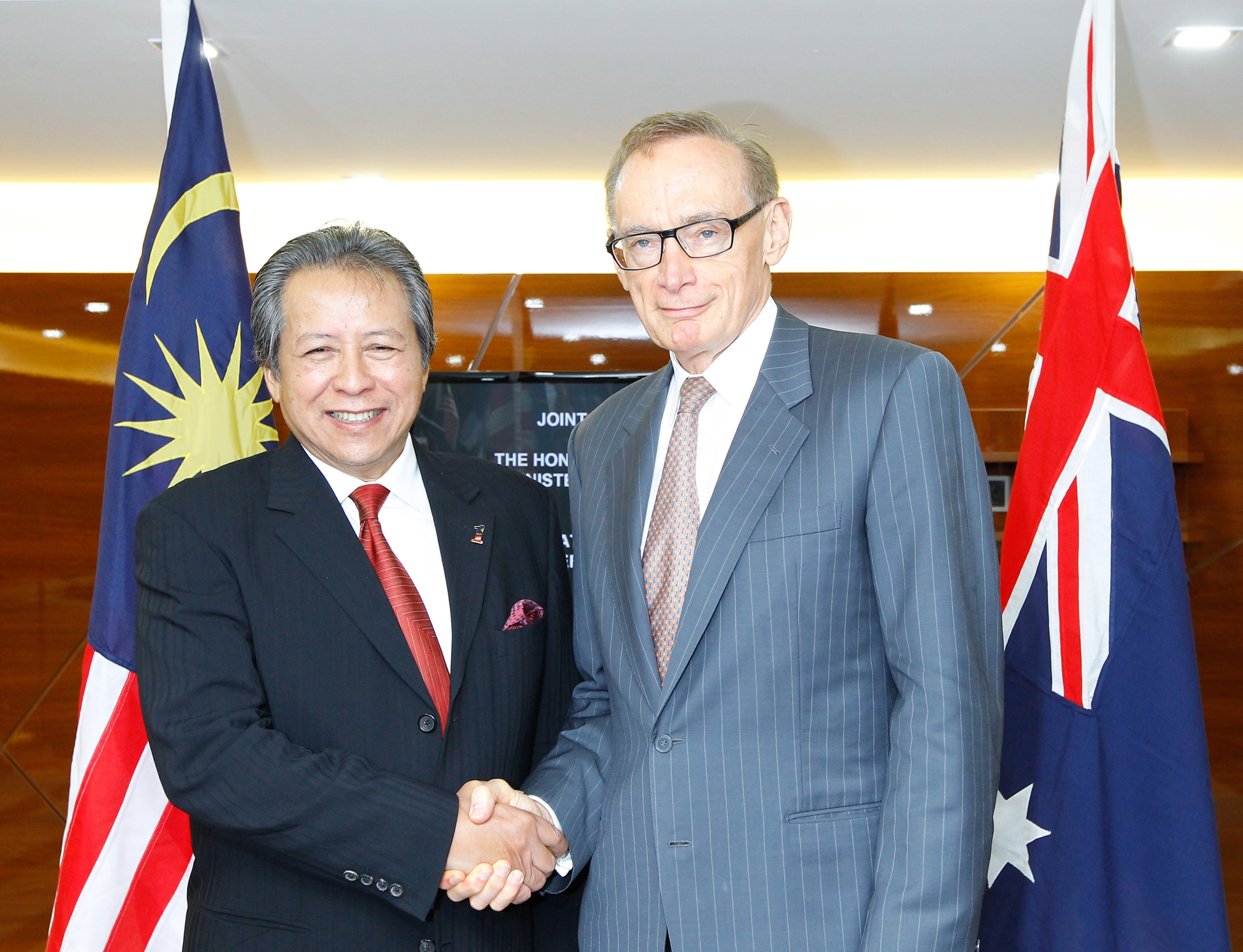
Australian Foreign Minister Bob Carr (right) handshaking with Malaysian Foreign Minister Anifah Aman (left) during Carr visit to Malaysia on 4 November 2012.

In April 2005, Malaysian Prime Minister Abdullah Ahmad Badawi made an official visit to Australia. Other Malaysian ministers undertook separate bilateral visits in the same year including the Minister of Human Resources Fong Chan Onn, Minister of Higher Education, Shafie Salleh, Minister of Environment and Natural Resources, Adenan Satem and Minister of Transport Chan Kong Choy. The following year, Minister of Agriculture and Agro-based Industries Muhyiddin Yassin visited Australia in March 2006 to remove barriers in the halal beef export trade to Malaysia with the signing of memorandum of understanding (MoU) on agricultural co-operation with Australian counterpart Peter McGauran. Malaysian Minister of Foreign Affairs Syed Hamid Albar visited Australia from 1–8 June 2006 and Minister of International Trade and Industry Rafidah Aziz visited from 31 July–8 August 2006 to attend the 13th Australia-Malaysia Joint Trade Committee meeting and to run a series of Malaysia trade promotion seminars. From the Australian side, Australia's Attorney-General, Philip Ruddock, Minister for Veterans' Affairs De-Anne Kelly, Minister for Agriculture, Fisheries and Forestry Warren Truss and Minister for Education, Science and Training Brendan Nelson undertook separate bilateral visits to Malaysia in 2005, while Deputy Prime Minister and Minister for Trade Mark Vaile visited the country in August 2005. In July 2008, Australian Prime Minister Kevin Rudd visited Malaysian Prime Minister Abdullah Ahmad Badawi. On 4 November 2012, following the visit made by Australian Foreign Minister Bob Carr, the two countries agreed for a joint Australia-Malaysia cultural exchange program for young Australians and Malaysians to travel to each other's countries and develop a stronger understanding of each other cultures and faiths. In June 2022, Malaysian-born Australian Foreign Minister Penny Wong visited Malaysia.

Most recently, Malaysian Prime Minister Dato' Seri Anwar Ibrahim visited Australia in March 2024 and participated in the 2nd Malaysia-Australia Annual Leaders' Meeting and ASEAN-Australia Special Summit. In December 2024, Australian Foreign Minister Penny Wong visited Malaysia for the 6th Australia-Malaysia Annual Foreign Ministers' Meeting.

== Security relations ==
Australia and Malaysia have had a well-established tradition of military co-operation, with Australian troops has contributed significantly to Malaysia's defence since its formation. As part of the alliance in Five Power Defence Arrangements, Australia plays a key role in the frequent military exercises between the countries involved. The Royal Australian Air Force (RAAF) formerly operated the base RMAF Butterworth in Malaysia until the airbase management is transferred to the Royal Malaysian Air Force (RMAF) in 1970. As part of the FPDA, the RAAF still maintains a presence at this base to this date.

Malaysia has expressed concerns on the AUKUS security pact between Australia, the UK and US, most recently during Australian Foreign Minister Penny Wong's visit to Malaysia. Malaysian Foreign Minister Saifuddin Abdullah told reporters he communicated Malaysia's "ongoing concern" about AUKUS spurring a regional arms race.

== Incidents ==
=== Lynas operation in Malaysia and concerns of environment pollution ===
In 2011, an Australian rare-earths mining company, Lynas has expressed their intention to established a plant in Pahang, Malaysia. The decision was highly opposed by local residents who were living near the proposed site for the plant together with environmentalist groups and Malaysian opposition parties who has expressed their concerns over fears of radioactive contamination. The Himpunan Hijau (Green Assembly) was then formed in March 2011 to protesting the Lynas rare earth project in Malaysia. Despite the protest, construction of the plant continued and it was granted temporary licence by the Malaysian authorities with the plant began its operation from December for the shipment of rare earth oxides. Four Malaysian cabinet member of parliament (MPs) (responsible for trade, science, natural resources and health) have released a joint statement, saying the temporary licence granted to Lynas requires it to remove "all the residue" from the plant out of the country. With the continuous opposition to Lynas operation in the country, several rallies has been held in Kuala Lumpur and 10 other cities in the country, as well as in 34 other countries including during the Bersih 3.0 rally held in 2012. In 2016, the company licence renewed for another three years with a cautious review undertaken by the Atomic Energy Licensing Board (AELB) of Malaysia.

=== Refugee swap deal ===
In July 2011, the two countries signed a refugee swap deal with Australia will send 800 asylum seekers to Malaysia and accept 4,000 verified refugees in return from Malaysia. Most of the asylum seekers are from Afghanistan, Iran, Iraq and Sri Lanka and usually travel to Australia through Malaysia or Indonesia. The deal was however rejected and declared illegal by the High Court of Australia the following month over concerns as Malaysia had no legal guarantee to protect the rights of asylum seekers especially when the country are not a signatory to the Convention Relating to the Status of Refugees, with many evidence has shown the mistreatment of 93,600 asylum seekers in the country including caning and denial of basic rights to the refugees, who mainly come from Myanmar, Sri Lanka, Somalia, Iraq and Afghanistan.

=== Misinterpretation of Xenophon speech by a Malaysian media and subsequent entry denial to Malaysia ===
In 2012, Australian Senator Nick Xenophon was on a fact-finding mission to Malaysia when he was caught up in anti-government protests in Kuala Lumpur. Subsequently, on 2 May 2012, the New Straits Times published an article written by journalist Roy See Wei Zhi with a title header "Observer under scrutiny". The report replaced words from a 2009 speech made by Xenophon and turned it into an attack on Islam, ostensibly to pit Malay-Muslim opinion against the senator, who was a known associate of Malaysian opposition leader Anwar Ibrahim. In fact, the speech was actually an attack on scientology with his original speech is recorded in the Hansard of the Australian Senate. Xenophon threatened to sue the newspaper for defamation and as a result the offending article was quickly removed from its website. The gaffe sparked media outrage in both Malaysia and Australia which has greatly reinforced public perception that the media merely serve as propaganda mouthpieces for Malaysia's ruling government of Barisan Nasional against all of its political opponents.

The following year on 16 February 2013, Xenophon was detained on arrival at Kuala Lumpur International Airport's LCCT and refused entry by the Malaysian immigration authorities. He was deported back to Australia on a flight early the next day. Other members of Parliament of Australia cancelled their plans to travel to Malaysia while the matter was resolved. The Prime Minister's Department of Malaysia confirmed that Xenophon was not part of the Australian delegation scheduled to meet Parliamentary Affairs Minister Nazri Aziz submitted to it by an aide to Anwar Ibrahim, the opposition leader in response to claims that it had deliberately denied entry to Xenophon.

=== Detention of Australian journalists in Malaysia ===
Two journalists from the Australian Broadcasting Corporation (ABC) were detained on 13 March 2016, after attempting to question the Malaysian Prime Minister Najib Razak over corruption allegations towards him, notably the 1Malaysia Development Berhad (1MDB) scandal.

== Gallery ==
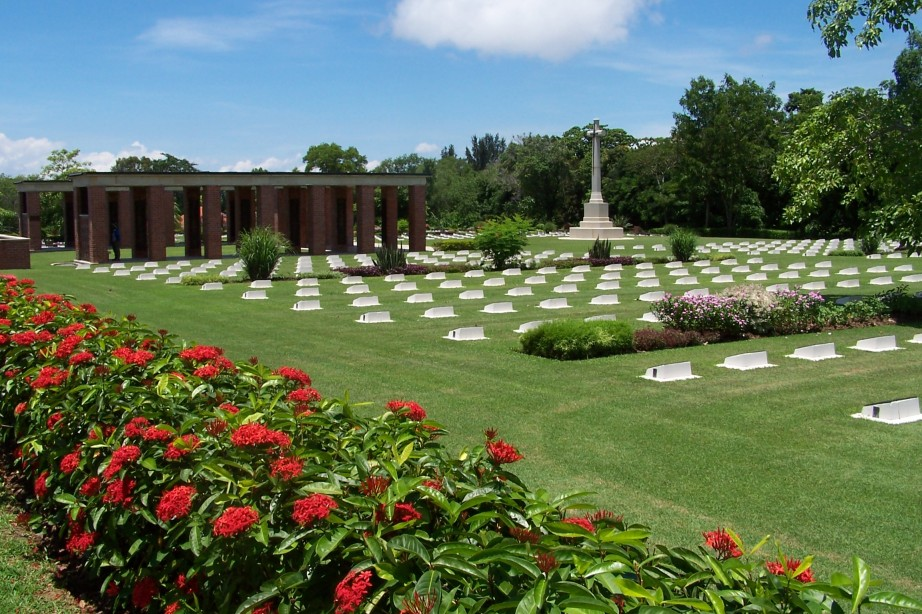
Labuan War Cemetery, in Labuan, Malaysia dedicated to Australian and Indian soldiers who died during World War II.

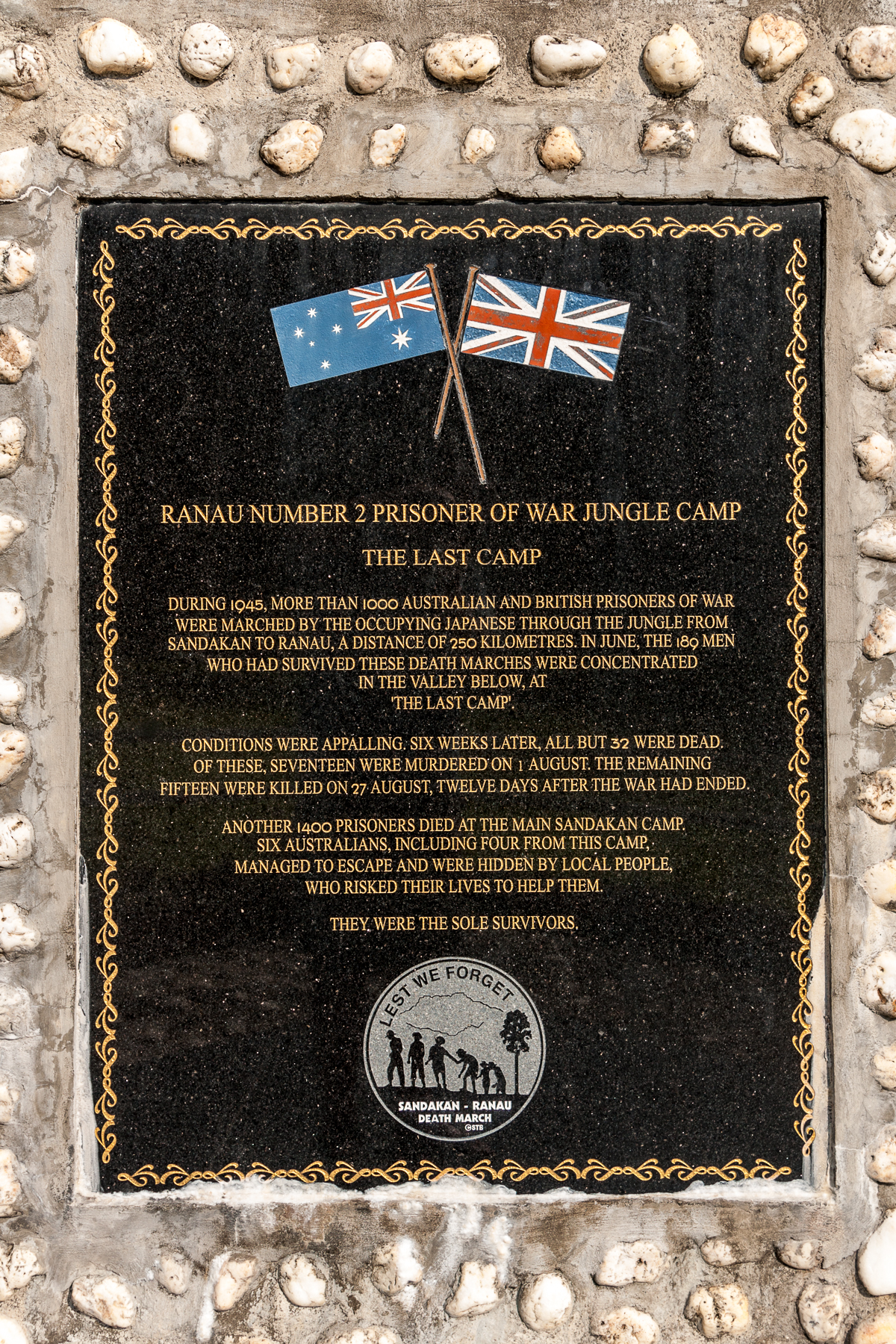
A memorial in Ranau, Sabah, Malaysia dedicated to Australian and British soldiers who died during the tragedy on the Sandakan Death Marches.

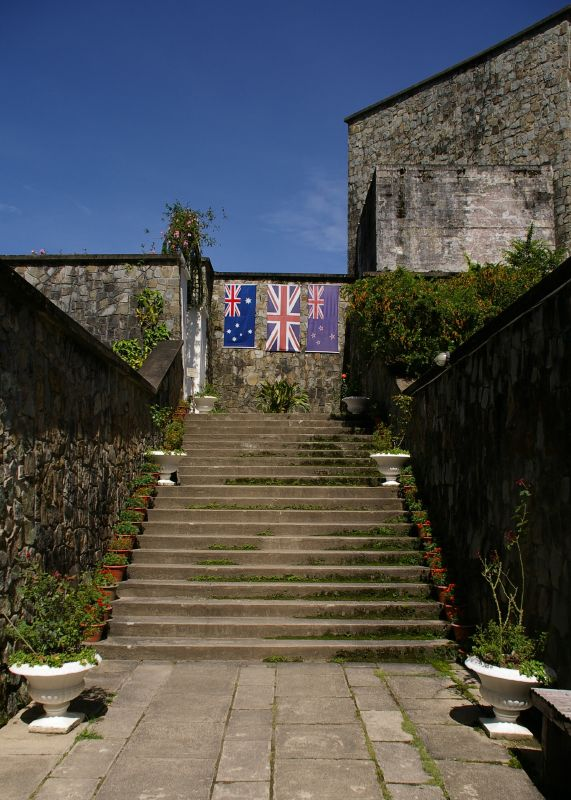
Three flags dedicated to Australian, British and New Zealanders soldiers in Kundasang War Memorial, Ranau, Sabah, Malaysia.

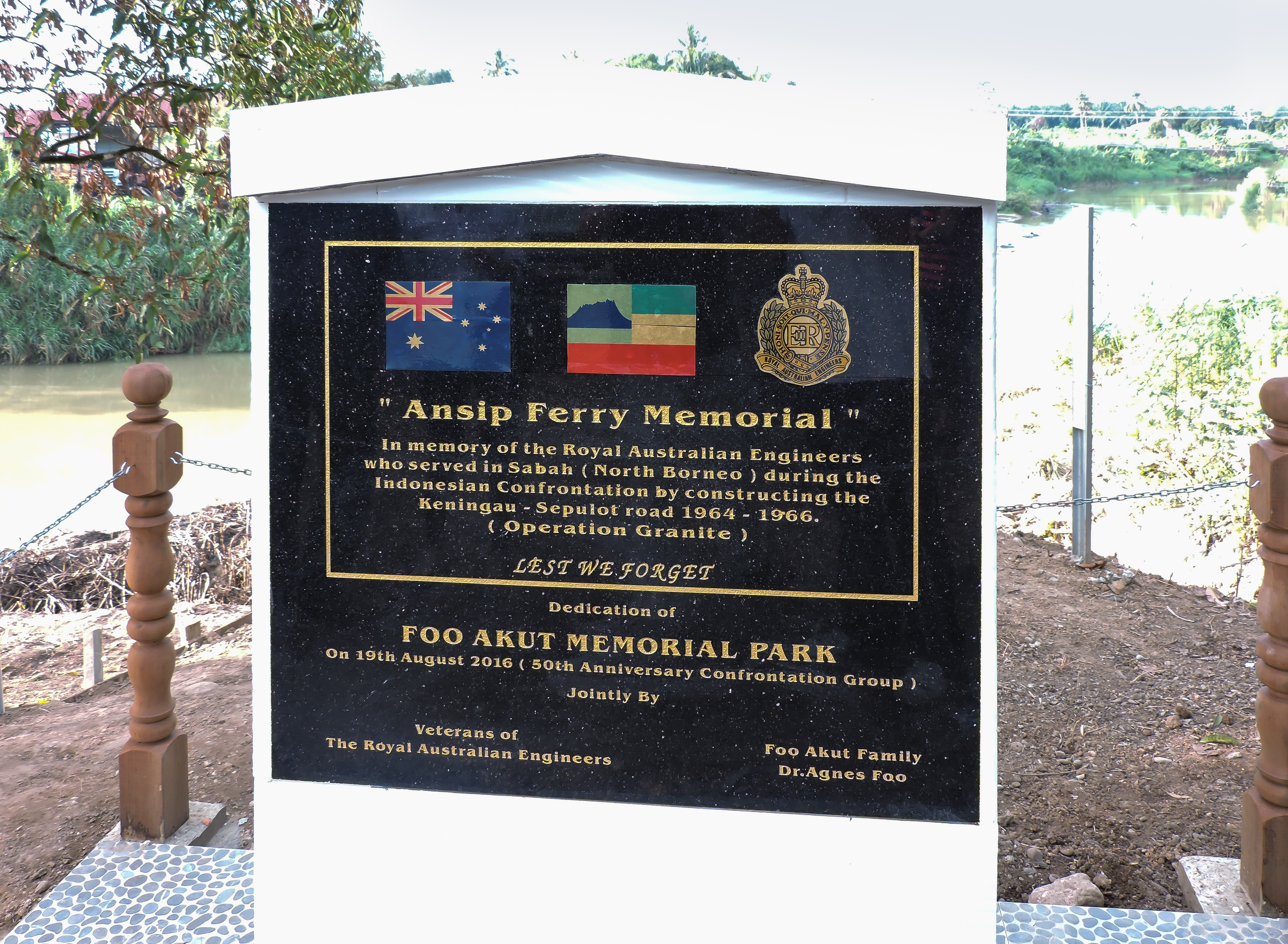
A memorial in Ansip Ferry, Keningau for the Royal Australian Engineers served in Sabah by constructing a 123.2 kilometres road between Keningau and Sapulut from 1964 to 1966.

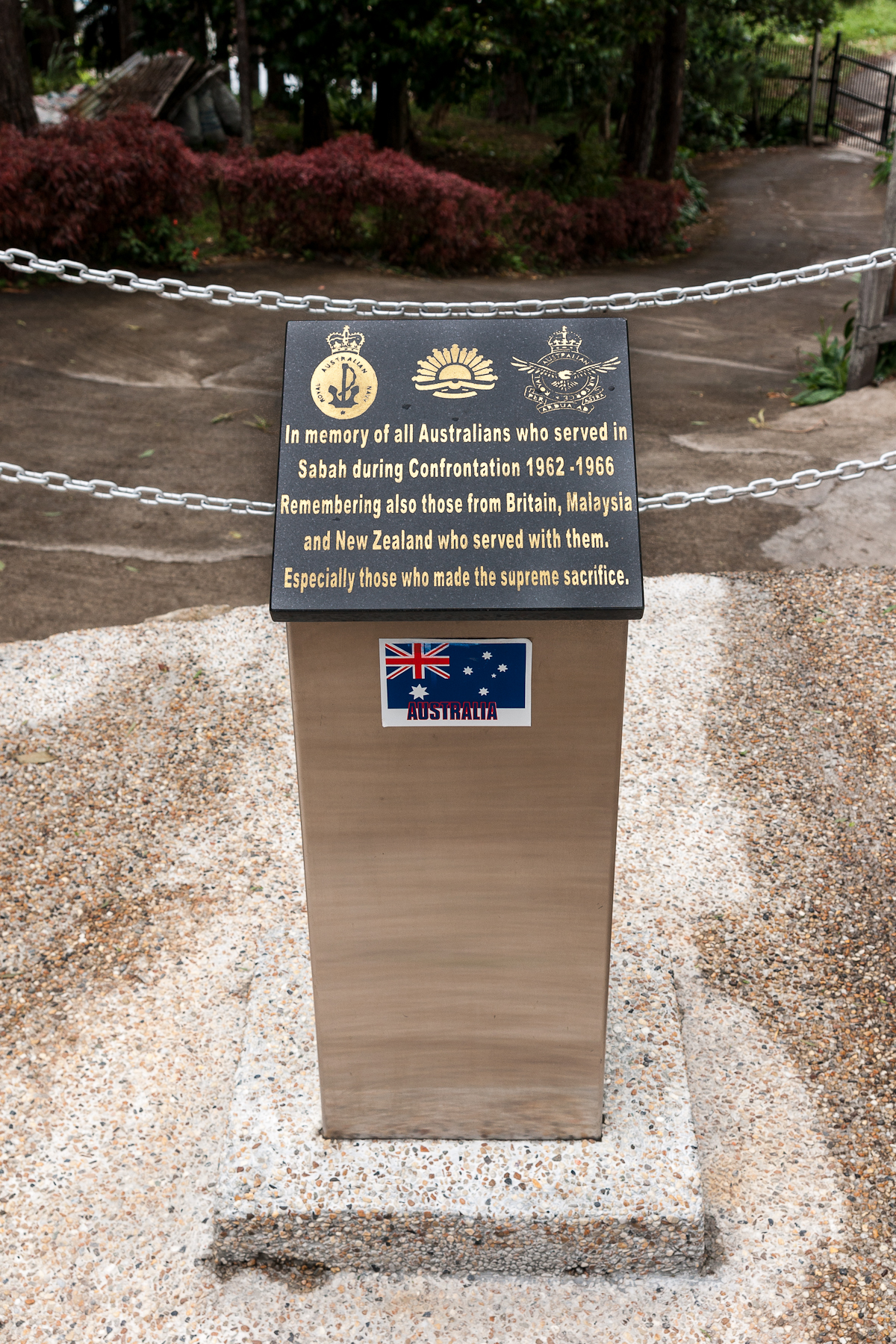
A memorial in Kundasang for Commonwealth forces served in Sabah, especially the Australians together with British, Malaysians and New Zealanders.

== Resident diplomatic missions ==
- Australia has a high commission in Kuala Lumpur and a consulate-general in Kuching.
- Malaysia has a high commission in Canberra and consulates-general in Melbourne, Perth, and Sydney.

== See also ==
- Foreign relations of Australia
- Foreign relations of Malaysia
- Malaysian Australians
