= Awang Hassan =

Malaysian politician

Yang Amat Berbahagia Tun Dato' Dr. Awang Hassan SMN SPMJ DUPN
- اواڠ حسن

5th Governor of Penang
- In office 1 May 1981 – 30 April 1989
- Chief Minister: Lim Chong Eu
- Preceded by: Sardon Jubir
- Succeeded by: Hamdan Sheikh Tahir

7th Malaysian High Commissioner to Australia
- In office 1973–1980
- Monarchs: Abdul Halim; Yahya Petra; Ahmad Shah
- Preceded by: Fuad Stephens
- Succeeded by: Lim Taik Choon

Member of the Malaysian Parliament for Muar Selatan (Parliament suspended 13 May 1969 – 20 February 1971)
- In office 1963–1974
- Preceded by: Suleiman Abdul Rahman
- Succeeded by: Constituency abolished

Personal details
- Born: 9 November 1910 Muar, Johor, Malaya (now Malaysia)
- Died: 12 September 1998 (aged 87) Johor Bahru, Johor, Malaysia
- Resting place: Mahmoodiah Royal Mausoleum
- Spouses: Khadijah Abdul Rahman (m. 1936; died 1987) Zubaidah Abdul Rahman (m. 1989)
- Relations: Abdul Rahman Mohamed Yassin (father-in-law); Ismail Abdul Rahman (brother-in-law); Suleiman Abdul Rahman (brother-in-law); Abu Bakar Suleiman (nephew)
- Children: 7 (including Yahya Awang)
- Education: King Edward VII College of Medicine
- Occupation: Politician
- Profession: Doctor

Awang bin Hassan (Jawi: اواڠ بن حسن; 9 November 1910 – 12 September 1998) was a Malaysian politician and doctor who served as the 5th Governor of Penang from 1981 until his retirement in 1989. He had previously served as the 7th Malaysian High Commissioner to Australia from 1973 to 1980.

== Early life and education ==
Awang was born in Muar, Johor, Malaya (now Malaysia). He received his early education at Sekolah Bukit Zahrah in Johor Bahru and later at the English College Johore Bahru. Awang began attendance at the King Edward VII College of Medicine (now the Yong Loo Lin School of Medicine of the National University of Singapore) and graduated with a Licentiate in Medicine and Surgery (LMS) in 1934. He worked as a specialist in Kandang Kerbau Hospital in Singapore before opening his own clinic.

== Political career ==
Awang joined politics and was made Deputy Speaker of Dewan Rakyat and Member of Parliament for Muar Selatan. He was later appointed as the 7th Malaysian High Commissioner to Australia from 1973 to 1980, after which he became the 5th Yang di-Pertua Negeri (Governor) of Penang, Malaysia from 1981 to 1989. Awang also played a part in the formation of United Malays National Organisation together with his brother-in-laws, Suleiman Abdul Rahman and Ismail Abdul Rahman.

== Personal life ==
Tun Awang married Toh Puan Khadijah Abdul Rahman, sister of Tun Dr. Ismail Abdul Rahman, the 2nd Deputy Prime Minister of Malaysia in 1936. They had four sons and three daughters. In 1989, two years after Toh Puan Khadijah's death, Tun Awang married her younger sister-in-law, Toh Puan Dr. Zubaidah Abdul Rahman.

== Death ==
Tun Dr. Awang Hassan died on 12 September 1998 at the age of 87. He was buried at the Mahmoodiah Royal Mausoleum in Johor Bahru.

== Honours ==
=== Honours of Malaysia ===
- Malaysia
  - Malaysian Commemorative Medal (Silver) (PPM) (1965)
  - Grand Commander of the Order of the Defender of the Realm (SMN) – Tun (1982)
- Johor
  - Knight Grand Commander of the Order of the Crown of Johor (SPMJ) – Dato' (1977)
- Penang
  - Knight Grand Commander (DUPN) with title Dato' Seri Utama
  - Grand Master of the Order of the Defender of State

=== Places named after him ===
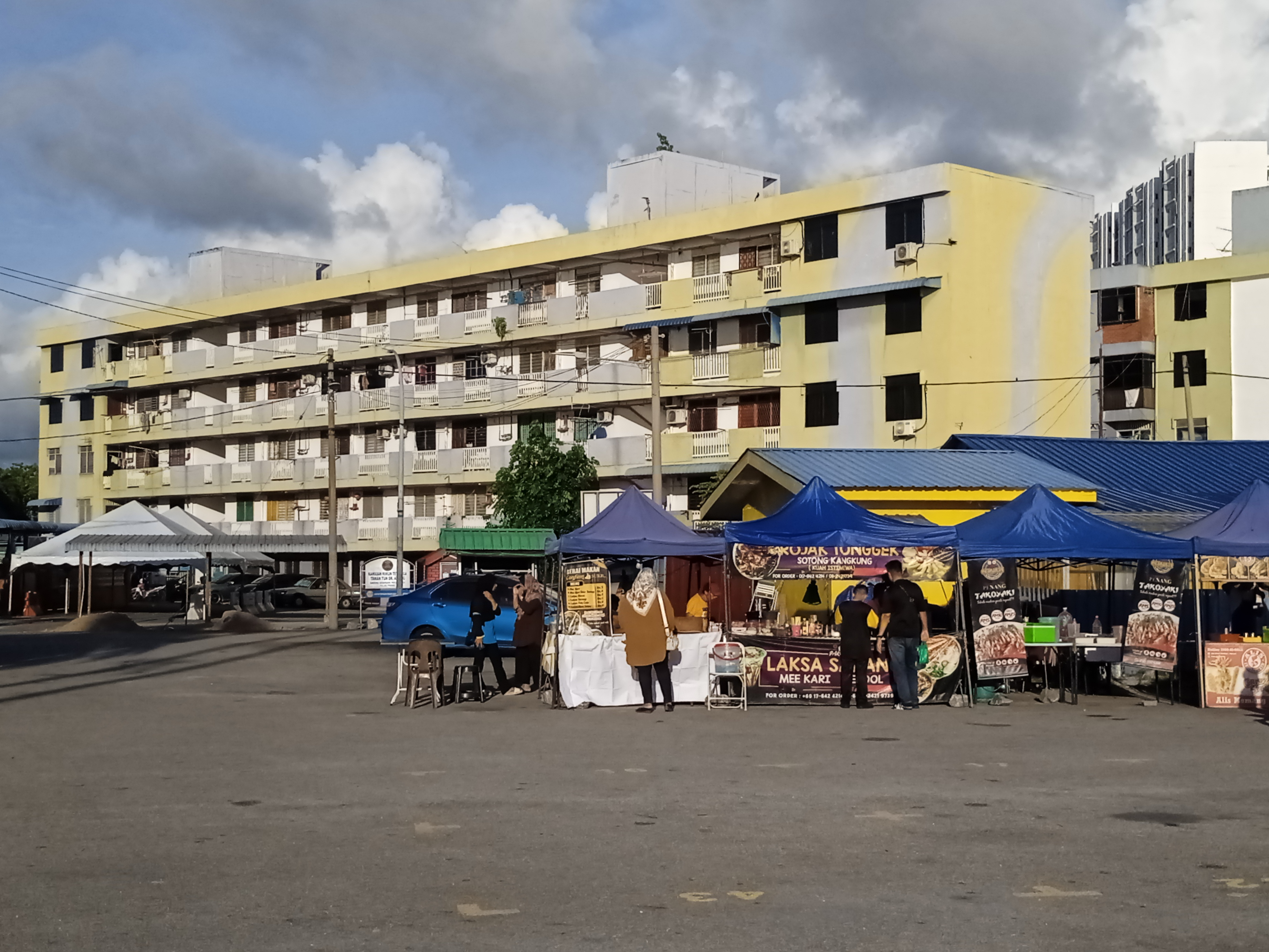
Taman Tun Dr Awang

Several projects and institutions were named after him, including:

- Jalan Tun Dr Awang, a major highway in Penang which connects from Sungai Nibong to Bayan Lepas
- Taman Tun Dr Awang, a township in Butterworth, Penang

== See also ==
- Yahya Awang
- Governor of Penang
- Muar

| Preceded by Fuad Stephens | Malaysian High Commissioner to Australia; 1973–1980 | Succeeded by Lim Taik Choon |
| Preceded by Sardon Jubir | Yang di-Pertua Negeri of Penang; 1981–1989 | Succeeded by Hamdan Sheikh Tahir |
