= Pahang honours list =

Pahang is one of the states in Malaysia that awards honours and titles.

== 2003 ==
- 9 recipients of Sri Sultan Ahmad Shah Pahang (SSAP)
- 16 recipients of Sri Indera Mahkota Pahang (SIMP)
- 16 recipients of Darjah Sultan Ahmad Shah (DSAP)
- 77 recipients of Darjah Indera Mahkota Pahang (DIMP)

all of which carry the title Dato'.

== 2012 ==
In 2012, 796 people received honors in Pahang.

- Eleven people received the Sri Sultan Ahmad Shah Pahang (SSAP) award

Those receiving the SSAP included:
- Dr. Mohd Irwan Serigar Abdullah, Treasury secretary-general
- Abdul Rahim Mohamad Radzi, Home Ministry secretary-general

- Eleven people received the Sri Indera Mahkota Pahang (SIMP) award
- Twenty people received the Sultan Ahmad Shah Pahang (DSAP) award
- Ninety-eight people received the Indera Mahkota Pahang (DIMP) award
- 656 people received other awards

== 2013 ==
In May 2013, the crown prince Abdullah Ahmad Shah, presented awards on behalf of his father at an investiture ceremony at the Abu Bakar Palace in Pekan. In December 2013, the crown prince Abdullah Ahmad Shah, presented additional awards on behalf of his father.

=== Sultan Ahmad Shah (SSAP) award ===
The SSAP medal, and the title Dato' Sri was awarded to:

- Hassan Malek, Minister of Domestic Trade, Cooperatives and Consumerism
- Y.A.A. Tan Sri Dato' Sri Datin Paduka Zaleha Zahari, Federal Court Judge
- Syed Ismail Syed Azizan. director of the Bukit Aman Police Headquarters Commercial Crime Investigation Department
- Datuk Seri Adnan Md Ikhsan, Federal Territories Ministry secretary-general
- Alias Ahmad, Immigration Department director-general
- Dr Emel Faizal Mohd Mokhtar, managing director and chief executive of Yayasan Felda
- Dr Goh Tian Chuan, Board of Directors executive chairman of Kumpulan Globaltec Formation

and six other people.

=== Other awards May 2013 ===
- Six people received the Darjah Sultan Ahmad Shah Pahang (DSAP) award
- 120 people received the Darjah Indera Mahkota Pahang (DIMP) award
- Twelve people received the Setia Ahmad Shah Pahang (SAP) award
- Eleven people received the Setia Mahkota Pahang (SMP) award
- Twelve people received one of the Ahli Ahmad Shah Pahang (AAP), Ahli Mahkota Pahang (AMP), Pingat Khidmat Cemerlang (PKC) and Pingat Kelakuan Terpuji (PKT) awards
- Twenty-four people received the Pingat Jasa Kebaktian (PJK) award

=== Other awards December 2013 ===
- Eleven people received the Darjah Sultan Ahmad Shah Pahang (DSAP) award
- 114 people received the Darjah Indera Mahkota Pahang (DIMP) award
- Ten people received the Setia Ahmad Shah Pahang (SAP) award
- Ten people received the Setia Mahkota Pahang (SMP) award
- Eleven people received the Ahli Ahmad Shah Pahang (AAP) award
- Eleven people received the Ahli Mahkota Pahang (AMP) award

== 2014 ==
At an investiture ceremony at Abu Bakar Palace, crown prince Abdullah handed out 199 medals and other awards on behalf of his father, Sultan Ahmad Shah.

Dr. Noor Hisham Abdullah, Director-General of Health, was one of four recipients of the Sri Sultan Ahmad Shah (SSAP) award.

== 2015 ==
- Seven people received Darjah Sri Sultan Ahmad Shah Pahang (SSAP) award.
- Nine people received the Darjah Sultan Ahmad Shah Pahang (DSAP) award
- 53 people received the Darjah Indera Mahkota Pahang (DIMP) award
- 11 people received the Setia Ahmad Shah Pahang (SAP) award
- 13 people received the Setia Mahkota Pahang (SMP) award

== 2016 ==
- 4 people received Darjah Sri Sultan Ahmad Shah Pahang (SSAP) award.
- 83 people received the Darjah Indera Mahkota Pahang (DIMP) award
- 22 people received the Darjah Setia Ahmad Shah Pahang (SAP) award
- 33 people received the Setia Mahkota Pahang (SMP) award
- 18 people received the Darjah Ahli Ahmad Shah Pahang (AAP) award
- 52 people received the Ahli Mahkota Pahang (AMP) award
