= List of leaders of public universities in Malaysia =

This is a list of the leaders of public universities in Malaysia, which comprises the Chancellor (as ceremonial leader), chairman of the Board of Directors (as chairman) and the Vice Chancellor (as chief executive officer).

University	Position	Incumbent	Since
University of Malaya (UM)	Chancellor	Sultan Nazrin Muizzuddin Shah of Perak	13 October 2014
University of Malaya (UM)	Chairman, Board of Directors	Zarinah Anwar	5 January 2022
University of Malaya (UM)	Vice Chancellor	Noor Azuan Abu Osman	2 November 2023
University of Putra Malaysia (UPM)	Chancellor	Sultan Sharafuddin Idris Shah of Selangor	1 April 2002
University of Putra Malaysia (UPM)	Chairman, Board of Directors	Ibrahim Komoo	7 February 2023
University of Putra Malaysia (UPM)	Vice Chancellor	Ahmad Farhan Mohd Sadullah	2 October 2023
Science University of Malaysia (USM)	Chancellor	Tuanku Syed Sirajuddin of Perlis	15 August 2007
Science University of Malaysia (USM)	Chairman, Board of Governors	Awang Adek Hussin	8 June 2020
Science University of Malaysia (USM)	Vice Chancellor	Abdul Rahman Mohamed	3 January 2023
National University of Malaysia (UKM)	Chancellor	Tuanku Muhriz of Negeri Sembilan	16 April 2009
National University of Malaysia (UKM)	Chairman, Board of Directors	Mohamad Abd. Razak	1 November 2021
National University of Malaysia (UKM)	Vice Chancellor	Sufian Jusoh	5 June 2025
University of Technology, Malaysia (UTM)	Chancellor	Raja Zarith Sofiah of Johor	25 September 2010
University of Technology, Malaysia (UTM)	Chairman, Board of Directors	Azman Mokhtar	5 April 2021
University of Technology, Malaysia (UTM)	Vice Chancellor	Mohd Shafry Mohd Rahim	9 January 2025
Northern University of Malaysia (UUM)	Chancellor	Sultan Sallehuddin of Kedah	4 November 2017
Northern University of Malaysia (UUM)	Chairman, Board of Directors	Mohd Shukor Mahfar	5 July 2020
Northern University of Malaysia (UUM)	Vice Chancellor	Mohd Fo'ad Sakdan	2 April 2023
MARA University of Technology (UiTM)	Chancellor	Sultan Ibrahim, King of Malaysia	13 November 2024
MARA University of Technology (UiTM)	Chairman, Board of Directors	Mohd Khamil Jamil	4 November 2024
MARA University of Technology (UiTM)	Vice Chancellor	Shahrin Sahib @ Sahibuddin	2 November 2023
International Islamic University Malaysia (UIAM)	Constitutional Head	Tunku Azizah Aminah Maimunah Iskandariah	12 April 2019
International Islamic University Malaysia (UIAM)	President	Samsudin Osman	1 July 2022
International Islamic University Malaysia (UIAM)	Rector	Osman Bakar	23 September 2024
Al-Sultan Abdullah Malaysian University of Pahang (UMPSA)	Chancellor	Al-Sultan Abdullah of Pahang	12 August 2006
Al-Sultan Abdullah Malaysian University of Pahang (UMPSA)	Chairman, Board of Directors	Abdul Razak Jaafar	1 November 2023
Al-Sultan Abdullah Malaysian University of Pahang (UMPSA)	Vice Chancellor	Yatimah Alias	13 January 2025
Malaysian University of Terengganu (UMT)	Chancellor	Sultanah Nur Zahirah of Terengganu	25 August 2007
Malaysian University of Terengganu (UMT)	Chairman, Board of Directors	Mohamad Salmi Mohd Sohod	7 July 2023
Malaysian University of Terengganu (UMT)	Vice Chancellor	Mohd Zamri Ibrahim	1 August 2024
Malaysian University of Perlis (UniMAP)	Chancellor	Tuanku Syed Faizuddin Putra of Perlis	1 September 2003
Malaysian University of Perlis (UniMAP)	Chairman, Board of Directors	Sufri Mohd Zin	16 August 2023
Malaysian University of Perlis (UniMAP)	Vice Chancellor	Zaliman Sauli	9 August 2021
Malaysian University of Sabah (UMS)	Chancellor	Musa Aman	TBA
Malaysian University of Sabah (UMS)	Chairman, Board of Directors	Abdul Rahman Dahlan	3 February 2021
Malaysian University of Sabah (UMS)	Vice Chancellor	Kasim Mansor	3 October 2022
Malaysian University of Sarawak (UNIMAS)	Chancellor	Wan Junaidi Tuanku Jaafar	16 October 2024
Malaysian University of Sarawak (UNIMAS)	Chairman, Board of Directors	Sulong Matjeraie	30 April 2018
Malaysian University of Sarawak (UNIMAS)	Vice Chancellor	Ahmad Hata Rasit	8 January 2024
Sultan Idris University of Education (UPSI)	Chancellor	Tuanku Zara Salim of Perak	1 January 2012
Sultan Idris University of Education (UPSI)	Chairman, Board of Directors	Rohani Parkash Abdullah	6 July 2020
Sultan Idris University of Education (UPSI)	Vice Chancellor	Md Amin Md Taff	24 June 2021
Tun Hussein Onn University of Malaysia (UTHM)	Chancellor	Tunku Ismail Idris of Johor	3 December 2022
Tun Hussein Onn University of Malaysia (UTHM)	Chairman, Board of Directors	Ibrahim Ahmad	26 October 2020
Tun Hussein Onn University of Malaysia (UTHM)	Vice Chancellor	Mas Fawzi Mohd Ali	14 July 2025
Malaysian Technical University of Melaka (UTeM)	Chancellor	Mohd Ali Rustam	5 March 2021
Malaysian Technical University of Melaka (UTeM)	Chairman, Board of Directors	Husaini Omar	1 June 2023
Malaysian Technical University of Melaka (UTeM)	Vice Chancellor	Massila Kamalrudin	21 March 2022
Sultan Zainal Abidin University (UniSZA)	Chancellor	Sultanah Nur Zahirah of Terengganu	8 August 2010
Sultan Zainal Abidin University (UniSZA)	Chairman, Board of Directors	Che Khalib Mohamad Noh	17 October 2022
Sultan Zainal Abidin University (UniSZA)	Vice Chancellor	Fadzli Adam	1 March 2022
Islamic Science University of Malaysia (USIM)	Chancellor	Tuanku Aishah Rohani of Negeri Sembilan	3 December 2011
Islamic Science University of Malaysia (USIM)	Chairman, Board of Directors	Nik Norzrul Thani Nik Hassan Thani	1 October 2023
Islamic Science University of Malaysia (USIM)	Vice Chancellor	Sharifudin Md Shaarani	1 July 2022
Malaysian University of Kelantan (UMK)	Chancellor	Sultan Muhammad V of Kelantan	23 November 2022
Malaysian University of Kelantan (UMK)	Chairman, Board of Directors	Hassan Basri Awang Mat Dahan	1 June 2023
Malaysian University of Kelantan (UMK)	Vice Chancellor	Arham Abdullah	16 February 2025
National Defense University of Malaysia (UPNM)	Chancellor	Sultan Ibrahim, King of Malaysia	3 December 2024
National Defense University of Malaysia (UPNM)	Chairman, Board of Directors	Syed Azman Syed Ibrahim	1 September 2017
National Defense University of Malaysia (UPNM)	Vice Chancellor	Arman Rumaizi Ahmad	30 January 2025

== See also ==
- Universities in Malaysia
- Ministry of Higher Education
