= IMU University =

Private research university in Malaysia

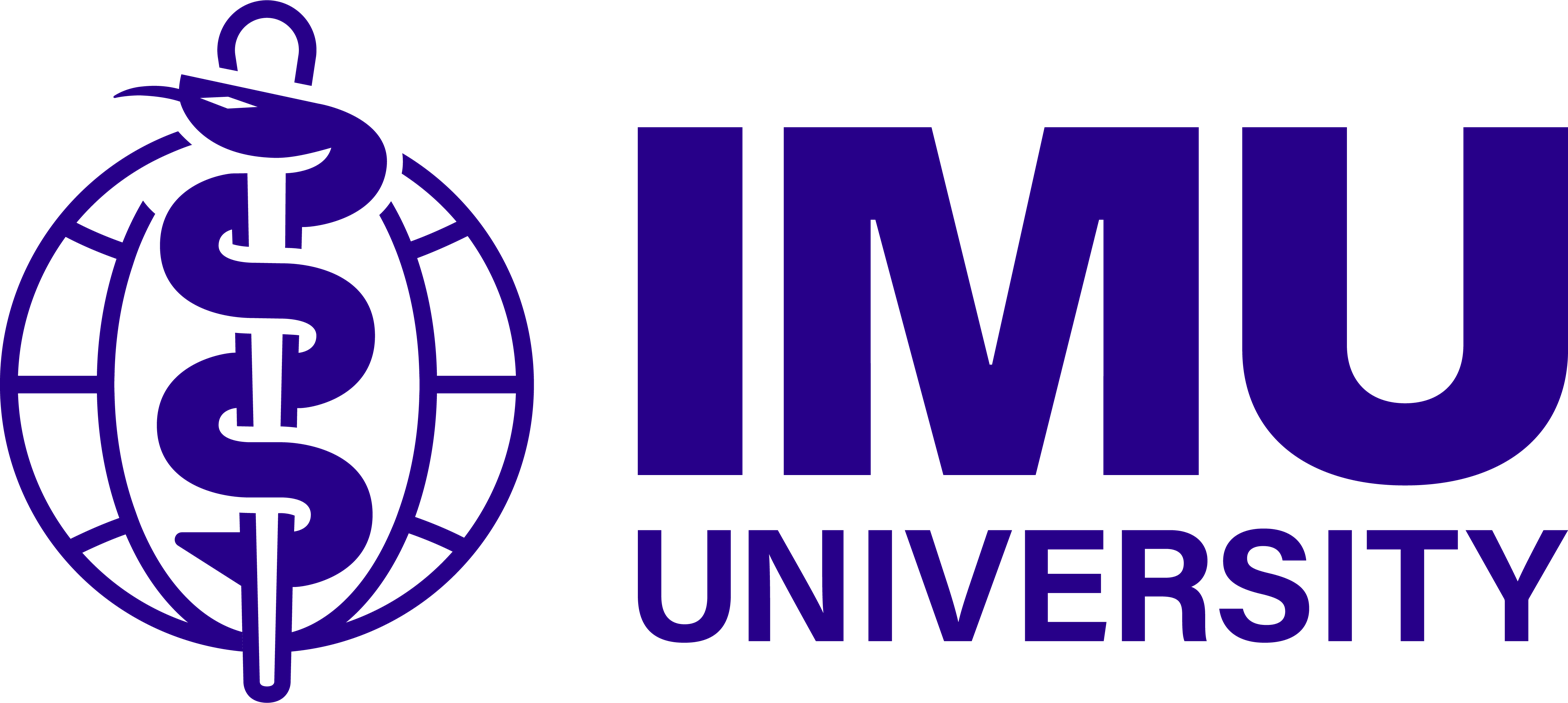
- Former names: International Medical College (1992), International Medical University (1999)
- Type: Private
- Established: 1992
- Parent institution: IMU Health Sdn Bhd
- Academic affiliations: APUCEN
- Chancellor: YBhg Tan Sri Dato’ Dr Yahya Awang
- Vice-Chancellor: Asma binti Ismail
- Students: 3,717
- Location: Bukit Jalil, Kuala Lumpur, Malaysia; 3.0597°N 101.6872°E
- Campus: Suburban
- Website: www.imu.edu.my

The IMU University (formerly known as the International Medical University) is a private English language health sciences university in Kuala Lumpur, Malaysia. The university offers programmes in medical and other health sciences as well as MSc and PhD programmes.

== History ==
IMU was established in 1992 and was the first private higher education institution in Malaysia that received the right to confer academic degrees, and it was granted full university status by the government in 1999.

IMU was one of only three private universities in Malaysia which was awarded the "6 Star: Outstanding" SETARA ranking by the Ministry of Higher Education in 2017 and subsequently in 2020.

== Ownership ==
IMU is a wholly owned subsidiary of Inbound Education Holdings Sdn Bhd (IEHSB), a consortium led by TPG's The Rise Fund, Hong Leong Group and Employees Provident Fund. The current Vice-Chancellor and CEO of IMU is professor emerita Datuk Dr Asma binti Ismail.

== Campus ==
The main campus of IMU University is located in Bukit Jalil, Kuala Lumpur. As of November 2022, the university has 781 employees and 3,717 students.

== Principal officers and management ==
The ceremonial head of the university is the Chancellor. Mohamed Zahir Ismail served as the first Chancellor (1999–2004), followed by Sulaiman Daud (2005–2010), T. Devaraj (2010–2013), Amir Abbas (2013–2018), Gan Ee Kiang (2018–2021) and Yahya Awang (since 2021). Currently Aini Ideris is the Pro-Chancellor.

The university's effective head and chief executive officer is the Vice-Chancellor, known as president before 2016. The first Vice-Chancellor was Kamal Salih (1993–2001), Abu Bakar Suleiman (2001–2015), Abdul Aziz Baba (2016–2024) and Asma Binti Ismail (Since 2024)

The Deputy Vice-Chancellor for Academic is Ian Martin Symonds (2023-current) who succeeded Peter Pook Chuen Keat (2016–2020) and Deputy Vice-Chancellor for Institutional Development and International is Vishna Devi A/P Nadarajah (2023). Prof Datuk Lokman Hakim Sulaiman is Deputy Vice-Chancellor, Research (2023-current).

Winnie Chee is Pro Vice-Chancellor, Academic (2023-current), succeeding Zabidi Hussin (2020–2022) and Pro Vice-Chancellor for Education is Er Hui Ming (2023-current).

Past Pro Vice-Chancellors includes Toh Chooi Gait (2016–2020) and Victor Lim (2016–2022).

IMU's former Vice-Chancellor Abu Bakar Suleiman is emeritus President of IMU Group and co-founder, Dr Mei Ling Young was advisor to the Group (2018–2021).

== Notable academics ==
- Abdul Aziz Baba, Professor and Vice-Chancellor
- Abu Bakar Suleiman, Senior Advisor
- Kew Siang Tong, Professor
- Ong Kok Hai, Professor
- Victor Lim, Professor and Past Pro Vice-Chancellor

IMU

IMU

IMU

== Partner universities ==
IMU has co-operation programmes with partner universities around the world, including the University of Edinburgh, Queen Mary University of London, the University of Manchester, and the University of New South Wales.

== Alumni ==
- Alumni Association of International Medical University (AAIMU)

Alumni Association of International Medical University (AAIMU) was established in 2002 where the elected committee members will serve for two years. The AAIMU has set up Chapters to work with the IMU's Schools and Centre to coordinate events and activities.

- Alumni Relations Office (ARO)

IMU Alumni Relations Office (ARO) was established in early 2016 with the aim to develop an international network of IMU graduates and to engage alumni through the exchange of knowledge, academic ideas and professional development. The Alumni Relations Office (ARO) serves as the point of contact for IMU alumni. The office is located at the Student Services Department, IMU Bukit Jalil Campus.
