= Yahya Awang =

Malaysian cardiothoracic surgeon

Yang Berbahagia Tan Sri Dato' Dr. Yahya Awang يحيى أواڠ PSM DPMJ DMPN DSAP SMJ KMN FRCS
- Born: 7 September 1950 (age 75); Colony of Singapore
- Citizenship: Malaysian
- Known for: Performing coronary artery bypass surgery on Mahathir Mohamad; Performing the first heart transplantation in Malaysia
- Spouse: Suraiya Hani Hussein
- Medical career
- Profession: Physician
- Sub-specialties: Cardiothoracic Surgery; Heart Transplantation

Yahya bin Awang (born 7 September 1950) is a Malaysian cardiothoracic surgeon; born to the former state governor (Yang di-Pertua Negeri) of Pulau Pinang from 1981 to 1989, Awang Hassan and Khadijah Abdul Rahman, sister of Ismail Abdul Rahman, the 2nd Deputy Prime Minister of Malaysia. He performed two coronary artery bypass graft surgeries for Mahathir Mohamad, first in 1989 and another in 2007.

He went on to help found and head the National Heart Institute of Malaysia (Institut Jantung Negara) (IJN) in 1992 and in 1997 he performed the first heart transplantation in Malaysia there.

== Honours and awards ==
=== Honours of Malaysia ===
- Malaysia
  - Commander of the Order of Loyalty to the Crown of Malaysia (PSM) – Tan Sri (2002)
  - Officer of the Order of the Defender of the Realm (KMN) (1990)
- Johor
  - Knight Commander of the Order of the Crown of Johor (DPMJ) – Dato' (1992)
  - Companion of the Order of the Crown of Johor (SMJ) (1988)
- Pahang
  - Knight Companion of the Order of Sultan Ahmad Shah of Pahang (DSAP) – Dato' (1996)
- Penang
  - Companion of the Order of the Defender of State (DMPN) – Dato' (1994)

=== Awards ===
- Malaysia
  - Merdeka Award (2014)
