= Malaysia Federal Route 3 =

Road in Malaysia

Federal Route 3

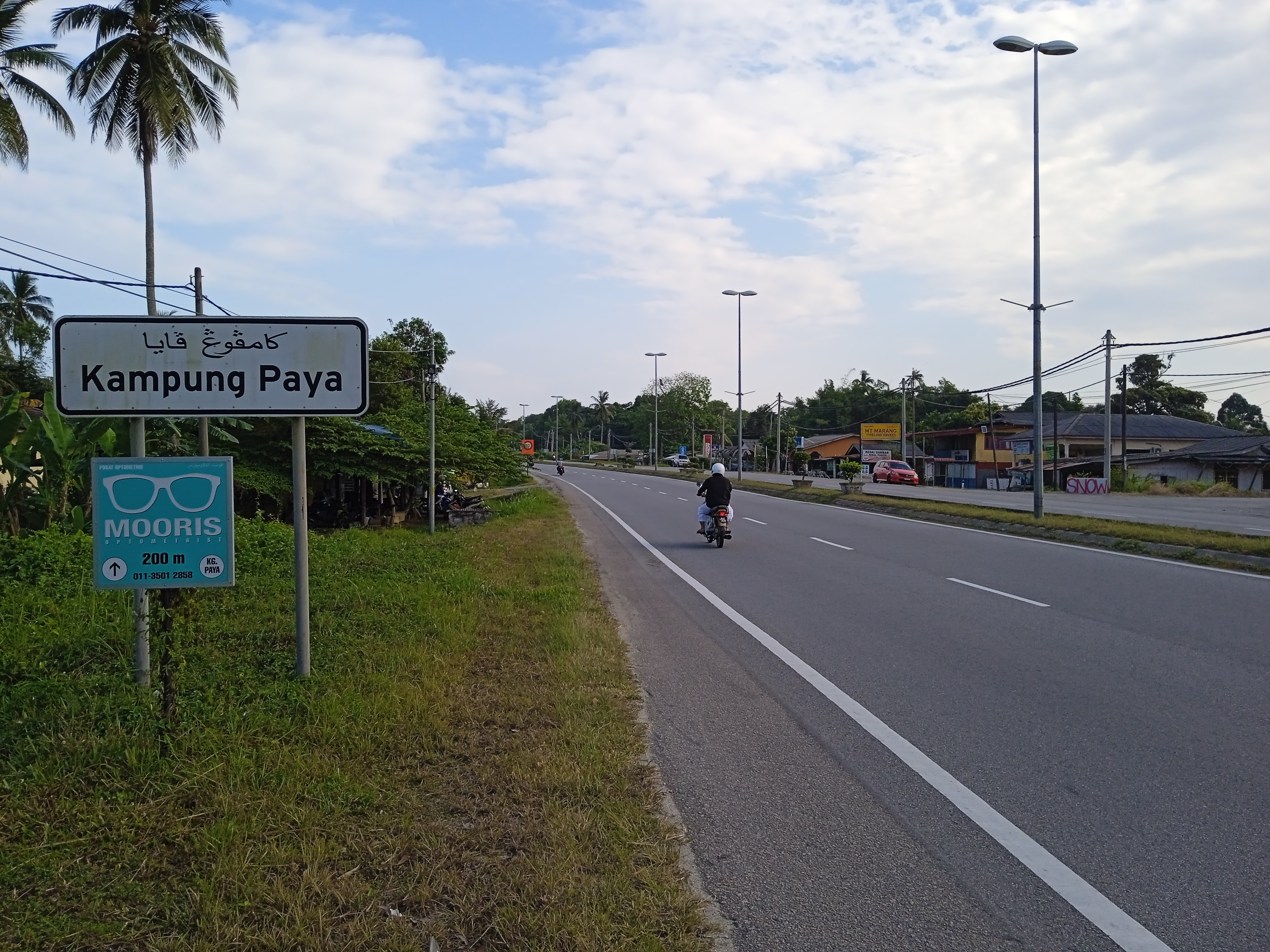
- Federal Route 3 in Marang District, Terengganu

Route information
- Part of AH18
- Maintained by Malaysian Public Works Department
- Length: 739.06 km (459.23 mi)
- Existed: 1866–present
- History: Completed in 1962

Major junctions
- North end: Rantau Panjang, Kelantan
- Roads: Hwy 4056 / AH18; FT 196 Federal Route 196; FT 129 Federal Route 129; FT 130 Federal Route 130; FT 208 Tendong–Mulong Highway; FT 134 Jalan Pengkalan Kubur; FT 8 Federal Route 8; FT 57 Jalan Pengkalan Chepa; FT 131 Jalan Raja Perempuan Zainab II; FT 211 Jalan Kubang Kerian–Bachok; FT 210 Pasir Puteh Bypass; FT 4 / AH140 Federal Route 4; FT 84 Federal Route 84; FT 285 Federal Route 285; FT 247 Federal Route 247; FT 65 Federal Route 65; FT 174 Federal Route 174; FT 459 Federal Route 459; FT 127 Federal Route 127; FT 124 Federal Route 124; FT 122 Federal Route 122; FT 145 FT 146 Kemaman Bypass; FT 237 Federal Route 237; FT 101 / AH141 Gebeng Bypass; FT 421 Jalan Pelabuhan Kuantan; FT 3485 Jalan Kawasan Perindustrian Gebeng; FT 14 Federal Route 14; FT 231 Jalan Sungai Lembing; FT 229 Jalan Permatang Badak; FT 420 Federal Route 420; FT 2 Gambang–Kuantan Highway; FT 183 Tanjung Lumpur Highway; FT 230 Jalan Ceruk Paluh; FT 82 Federal Route 82; FT 63 Federal Route 63; FT 50 Federal Route 50; FT 1393 Jalan Utama Tenggaroh; FT 99 Federal Route 99; FT 92 Federal Route 92; FT 91 Federal Route 91; FT 94 Federal Route 94; FT 17 Pasir Gudang Highway; FT 1 Skudai Highway; Expressways: East Coast Expressway / AH141; Senai–Desaru Expressway; Johor Bahru Eastern Dispersal Link Expressway / AH2; North–South Expressway Southern Route / AH2
- South end: Johor Bahru, Johor

Location
- Country: Malaysia
- Primary destinations: Kelantan: Rantau Panjang; Pasir Mas; Kota Bharu; Pasir Puteh; Terengganu: Jerteh; Bandar Permaisuri; Kuala Terengganu; Marang; Kuala Dungun; Chukai; Pahang: Kuantan; Pekan; Kuala Rompin; Johor: Endau; Mersing; Jemaluang; Kota Tinggi; Kulai; Johor Bahru

Highway system
- Highways in Malaysia; Expressways; Federal; State

Federal Route 3 is a main federal road running along the east coast of Peninsular Malaysia. The 739 kilometres (459 mi) federal highway connects Rantau Panjang (near the border with Thailand) in Kelantan until Johor Bahru in Johor. The entire FT3 highway is gazetted as a part of the Asian Highway Network route 18.

The Federal Route 3 has gained a reputation as one of the best coastal highways in Malaysia and Asia due to the scenic views along the highway, as being recognised by the National Geographic Society and Harian Metro. The Federal Route 3 is named as one of the top 10 coastal highways in Asia by the National Geographic Society, while Harian Metro recognises the FT3 highway as one of the best highways in Malaysia.

== Route background ==
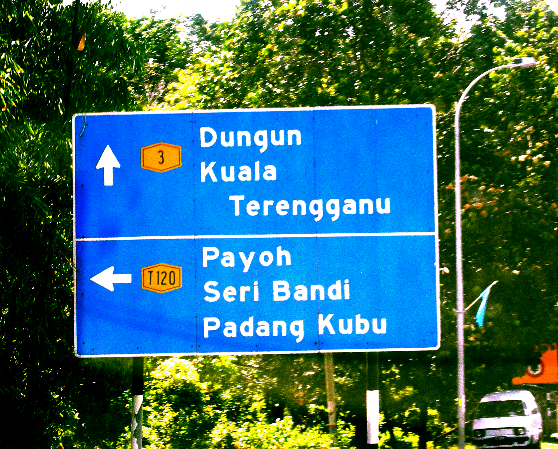
A direction signboard on the northbound lane of Federal Route 3 in Terengganu.

The Federal Route 3 is one of the three north–south backbone federal highways in Peninsular Malaysia; the other two are the Federal Routes 1 and 5. Generally, the Federal Route 3 runs mostly along the east coast of Peninsular Malaysia.

The FT3 highway begins as a divided highway at Johor Bahru Interchange that links with the Federal Route 1, the main trunk road of the central Peninsular Malaysia, at its first kilometer. Then at Kota Tinggi, the FT3 becomes a super two highway until Pekan. However, the FT3 is not a coastal highway yet; it is only at Mersing that the FT3 highway starts to become a coastal highway. At Pekan, the FT3 crosses the Pahang River via the Sultan Abu Bakar Bridge FT3 and proceeds to Kuantan as a divided highway.

At Kuantan, the FT3 concurrents with Gambang–Kuantan Highway FT2 briefly from Exit 254 Jalan Pekan Interchange to Exit 253 Pandan Interchange before the FT3 is diverted to Kuantan Bypass FT3. The Kuantan Bypass FT3 continues as the Kuantan–Kuala Terengganu Road FT3 that runs along the coastline of Terengganu. At Kuala Terengganu, the FT3 highway is diverted to Kuala Terengganu–Kota Bharu Road FT3 that runs along the northern interior region of Terengganu and the plains of northern Kelantan. At Kota Bharu, the FT3 crosses the Kelantan River via the Sultan Yahya Petra Bridge FT3 to Wakaf Bharu before running along the west bank of the Kelantan River to Pasir Mas. At Pasir Mas, the FT3 highway is diverted west towards Rantau Panjang at the Malaysia–Thailand border. At the Malaysia–Thailand border, the FT3 highway crosses the Golok River via the Rantau Panjang–Sungai Golok Bridge and continues as Sungai Padi Road (Route 4056) and Route 42 in Thailand.

== History ==
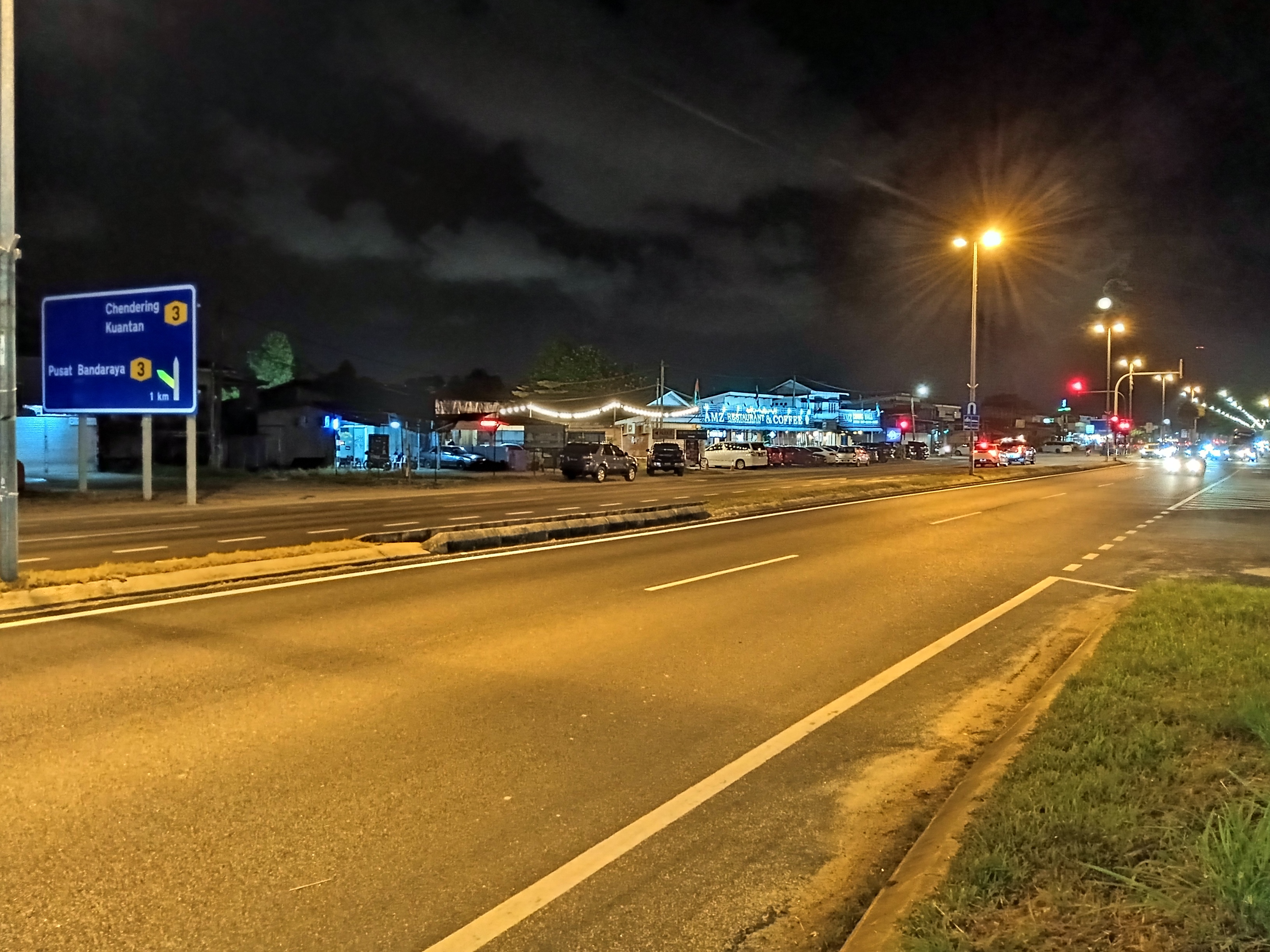
Federal Route 3 at Kuala Terengganu at night

The Federal Route 3 began as an 8 miles (13 km) short road from Johor Bahru to Sungai Pandan, which formed the present-day Tebrau Highway FT3. It was constructed in 1866 by Dato' Muhamad Salleh bin Perang (also known as Dato' Bentara Luar). The road was later extended to Kota Tinggi, which was completed in 1919. Meanwhile, in 1915, the Kuala Terengganu–Kota Bharu Road FT3 was constructed, which was completed in 1923.

In 1911, the state government of Johor collaborated with the British colonial government to develop a road network from Johor Bahru to Batu Pahat and Muar. As a result, the Batu Pahat–Kluang–Mersing Road was completed in 1919, where the section from Jemaluang to Mersing formed a part of the present-day Federal Route 3. At the same time, another section of road between Kota Tinggi to Jemaluang was constructed to link between both Johor Bahru–Kota Tinggi Road FT3 and Jemaluang–Mersing FT3. In 1939, the Kuantan–Kuala Terengganu Road FT3 and the Kuantan–Pekan Road FT3 (up until Peramu at the north bank of the Pahang River) was constructed.

Unlike major roads in western states of Malaya, the construction progress of the Federal Route 3 was sluggish, due to the lack of economic resources in the eastern states of Malaya. As a result, a gap between Pekan to Endau existed due to very scarce population and swampy terrain. To fill in the gap, the first post-independent Malaysian Minister of Works, Tun V.T. Sambanthan, requested the federal government to allocate a large amount of budget to fund the construction of newer rural roads, as well as the rehabilitation of existing roads. The construction of newer rural road network grew from 400 miles (644 km) in 1961 to 700 miles (1,127 km) in the next year. Among these, the longest road projects were the Pekan–Kuala Rompin Road FT3 and Endau–Kuala Rompin Road FT3, both completed in 1962. The completion of both roads had thus concluded the construction of the entire Federal Route 3.

Like its west coastal counterpart, the construction of the Federal Route 3 required a lot of longer bridges. As a result, some major bridges such as the Sultan Yahya Petra Bridge FT3 in Kota Bharu and the Sultan Abu Bakar Bridge in Pekan were constructed as toll bridges to help recovering the construction costs. The Sultan Yahya Petra Bridge FT3 was built in 1962 and was opened on 17 April 1965, while the Sultan Abu Bakar Bridge FT3 was built in 1968 and was opened on 28 February 1970. Meanwhile, another major bridge along the FT3, the Pulau Rusa Bridge FT3 near Kuala Terengganu, was constructed in 1960.

On 1 September 1974, the Kuantan Port Authority was established to build the Kuantan Port. The construction began in 1976 and was fully opened in 1984. As a result, a new roadway bypassing Kuantan was built in order to reduce the road congestion in Kuantan as well as to minimize the road damage caused by heavy vehicles commuting to Kuantan Port. The Kuantan Bypass FT3 was later being upgraded into a divided highway in 2005, which was completed in 2007.

The entire section of the FT3 highway forms the Malaysian section of the Asian Highway Route AH18. As a result, sections of the Federal Route 3 are progressively being upgraded to either super two highways or divided highways. Besides, the Federal Route 3 remains popular as a scenic coastal route of the east coast of Peninsular Malaysia and is unaffected by the presence of the East Coast Expressway Phase 2 (ECE2) E8, due to the fact that the FT3 highway has been recognized by the National Geographic Society as one of the top 10 coastal highways in Asia.

The Federal Route 3 that pass through Kijal and Teluk Kalong is gazetted as Federal Route 145, the original Federal Route 145 (Kemaman Bypass) is gazetted as part of Federal Route 3.

== Features ==
At most sections, the Kuantan Bypass was built under the JKR R5 road standard, allowing maximum speed limit of up to 90 km/h (56 mph).

=== Overlaps ===
Shield	Route Name	Section
FT 2	Gambang–Kuantan Highway	Pandan Interchange–Jalan Pekan Intersections

== Accidents ==
- On 9 December 2025, one man dead in an accident involved trailer and pickup vehicle.

== Major interchange and junction lists ==
Legend:

- I/C - Interchange, I/S - Intersection, RSA - Rest and service area, OBR - Overhead bridge restaurant, R/R - Restaurant and rest plaza, L/B - Layby, V/P - Vista point, TN - tunnel, T/P - Toll plaza, BR - Bridge
- C - Cloverleaf, S - Stack, T-A - Trumpet-A, T-B - Trumpet-B, DT - Directional-T/Y, SDT - Semi-Directional-T/Y, P-Y - Partial-Y, D - Diamond, P-C - Partial cloverleaf, D-D - Diverging diamond, D-R - Direct ramp

State	District	Location	km	mi	Exit	Name	Destinations	Notes
Kelantan	Pasir Mas	Rantau Panjang	739.0	459.2	ASEAN Malaysia–Thailand border Rantau Panjang–Sungai Golok Bridge (Length: 109.73 m); Golok River; Through to Hwy 42 / AH18			
Kelantan	Pasir Mas	Rantau Panjang	739.0	459.2	Rantau Panjang Checkpoint			
Kelantan	Pasir Mas	Rantau Panjang				Rantau Panjang	FT 196 Malaysia Federal Route 196 – Rantau Panjang Duty Free Zone Customs Checkpoint (Gate 1) Customs, Town Centre (South Section) (Duty Free Zone), Duty Free Zone Complex	Junctions
Kelantan	Pasir Mas	Rantau Panjang				Rantau Panjang	Kilometre Zero (0 KM) Monument	
Kelantan	Pasir Mas	Rantau Panjang				Rantau Panjang	FT 196 Malaysia Federal Route 196 – Jeram Perdah, Tumpat, Panglima Bayu, Bukit Bunga	Junctions
Kelantan	Pasir Mas	Rantau Panjang				Tasek Kedotak		
Kelantan	Pasir Mas	Rantau Panjang				Kampung Alor Tasek Berangan	D181 Jalan Lubok Itek – Lubok Itek	T-junctions
Kelantan	Pasir Mas	Pasir Mas				Kampung Putat Tujoh		
Kelantan	Pasir Mas	Pasir Mas				Gual Periok	D185 Jalan Gual Periok – Gual Periok	T-junctions
Kelantan	Pasir Mas	Pasir Mas				Bandar Baru Pasir Mas; Lubok Jong	FT 261 Malaysia Federal Route 261 – Bukit Mas, Tanah Merah	T-junctions
Kelantan	Pasir Mas	Pasir Mas				Kampung Taman	D22 Jalan Tasik Berangan – Tumpat, Pengkalan Kubur, Wat Photivihan	T-junctions
Kelantan	Pasir Mas	Pasir Mas				Jalan Chica Tinggi	D184 Jalan Chica Tinggi – Banggol Manok, Chica Tinggi	T-junctions
Kelantan	Pasir Mas	Pasir Mas				Pasir Mas; Pasir Mas Roundabout	FT 130 Malaysia Federal Route 130 – Salor, Wakaf Che Yeh; FT 129 Malaysia Federal Route 129 – Tanah Merah	Roundabout
Kelantan	Pasir Mas	Pasir Mas				Pasir Mas; Lemai Overpass	D25 Jalan Meranti – Meranti	
Kelantan	Pasir Mas	Pasir Mas				Pasir Mas		
Kelantan	Pasir Mas	Tendong				Kampung Bechah		
Kelantan	Pasir Mas	Tendong				Tendong; Tendong–Mulong Highway	FT 208 Tendong–Mulong Highway – Mulong, Wakaf Che Yeh, Salor	T-junctions
Kelantan	Pasir Mas	Tendong				Tendong	D180 Jalan Bunut Susu – Bunut Susu	Junctions
Kelantan	Pasir Mas	Tendong				Padang Embun		
Kelantan	Tumpat	Pasir Pekan				Kampung Lama		
Kelantan	Tumpat	Pasir Pekan				Kampung Pauh Kumbang		
Kelantan	Tumpat	Pasir Pekan				Kampung Kutan		
Kelantan	Tumpat	Pasir Pekan				Pasir Pekan		
Kelantan	Kota Bharu	Kota Bharu				Wakaf Bharu–Kota Bharu–Kubang Kerian	see also Wakaf Bharu–Kota Bharu–Kubang Kerian Highway	
Kelantan	Kota Bharu	Peringat				Peringat		
Kelantan	Kota Bharu	Peringat				Limbat		
Kelantan	Kota Bharu	Peringat				Jalan Jelawat	D128 Jalan Jelawat – Bachok, Jelawat, Pantai Irama	T-junctions
Kelantan	Bachok	Bachok				Jalan Ketereh	D14 Jalan Ketereh – Ketereh, Masjid Kampung Laut, Bachok, Jelawat	Junctions
Kelantan	Pasir Puteh	Selising				Selising		
Kelantan	Pasir Puteh	Pasir Puteh				Kampung Cherang Tuli	FT 210 Pasir Puteh Bypass – Kuala Terengganu, Besut	T-junctions
Kelantan	Pasir Puteh	Pasir Puteh				Pasir Puteh	Jalan Pasir Puteh–Kampung Tok Bali – Kampung Tok Bali	T-junctions
Kelantan	Pasir Puteh	Pasir Puteh				Kampung Dalam Kemunting	FT 210 Pasir Puteh Bypass – Kota Bharu, Bachok; D7 Jalan Semerak – Cherang Ruku, Pantai Bisikan Bayu	Junctions
Kelantan	Pasir Puteh	Pasir Puteh				East–West Highway	FT 4 / AH140 Malaysia Federal Route 4 – Machang, Tanah Merah, Jeli, Gerik	T-junctions
Kelantan	Pasir Puteh	Pasir Puteh				Kampung Bukit Kong		
Kelantan-Terengganu border					Terengganu Border Arch			
Terengganu	Besut	Jerteh				Jalan Kuala Besut	FT 189 Malaysia Federal Route 189 – Kuala Besut, Kuala Besut Ferry Terminal (Ferry to Perhentian Island)	T-junctions
Terengganu	Besut	Jerteh			Anti-Smuggling Unit (UPP) checkpost			
Terengganu	Besut	Jerteh			Sungai Besut Bridge			
Terengganu	Besut	Jerteh				Jerteh	T5 Jalan Pasir Akar – Pasir Akar, Kampung La, La Hot Spring, Lata Tembakah	T-junctions
Terengganu	Besut	Jerteh				Jalan Kampung Raja	FT 84 Malaysia Federal Route 84 – Kampung Raja, Alor Lintah, Kuala Besut, Pulau Perhentian (Jetty), Pantai Air Tawar, Pantai Bukit Keluang, Bukit Kluang, Pantai Dendong	T-junctions
Terengganu	Besut	Jerteh				Lata Belatan		
Terengganu	Besut	Jerteh				Kampung Apal		
Terengganu	Besut	Jerteh				Kampung Jabi		
Terengganu	Besut	Jerteh				Kampung Tok Dor		
Terengganu	Setiu	Bandar Permaisuri				Kampung Bintang		
Terengganu	Setiu	Bandar Permaisuri				Jalan Kampung Guntong	Kampung Guntong	T-junctions
Terengganu	Setiu	Bandar Permaisuri				Bandar Permaisuri	Jalan Kampung Padang – Kampung Padang; FT 285 Malaysia Federal Route 285 – Penarik, Merang, Batu Rakit, Redang Island (Jetty), Pantai Rhu Sepuloh, Terengganu International Endurance Park	Junctions
Terengganu	Setiu	Bandar Permaisuri				Setiu Agro Resort		
Terengganu	Setiu	Chalok				Kampung Rahmat		
Terengganu	Setiu	Chalok				Kampung Hulu Caluk		
Terengganu	Setiu	Chalok				Kampung Batu Hampar	Kampung Langkap	T-junctions
Terengganu	Setiu	Sungai Tong				Sungai Tong Estate		
Terengganu	Setiu	Sungai Tong				Sungai Tong	FELCRA Sungai Tong, Kampung Bukit Genting	T-junctions
Terengganu	Setiu	Sungai Tong				Sungai Tong Estate		
Terengganu	Setiu	Sungai Tong				Jalan Sungai Tong–Kuala Berang	FT 247 Malaysia Federal Route 247 – Kuala Berang, Gua Musang, Kenyir Lake	T-junctions
Terengganu	Kuala Nerus	Kuala Nerus				Kampung Cenering		
Terengganu	Kuala Nerus	Kuala Nerus				Kuala Terengganu-ECE	East Coast Expressway – Kota Bharu, Kuala Krai, Jerteh, Telemong, Ajil, Kuantan, Kuala Lumpur	T-junctions
Terengganu	Kuala Nerus	Kuala Nerus				Kampung Gemuruh		
Terengganu	Kuala Nerus	Kuala Nerus				Kampung Bukit Lapan		
Terengganu	Kuala Nerus	Kuala Nerus				Kuala Nerus; Roundabout	FT 65 Tengku Ampuan Intan Zaharah Road – Penarik, Batu Rakit, Batu Rakit Beach, Rhu Sepuloh Beach, Sultan Mahmud Airport; FT 65 Jalan Tengku Mizan – Seberang Takir, Kuala Terengganu	Roundabout
Terengganu	Kuala Nerus	Kuala Nerus				Kuala Nerus		
Terengganu	Kuala Nerus–Kuala Terengganu district border				Sungai Nerus bridge			
Terengganu	Kuala Terengganu	Kuala Terengganu				Manir Bypass	Kuala Terengganu Bypass	Diamond interchange
Terengganu	Kuala Terengganu	Kuala Terengganu				Manir		
Terengganu	Kuala Terengganu	Kuala Terengganu			Terengganu River Bridge			
Terengganu	Kuala Terengganu	Kuala Terengganu				Durian Burung		
Terengganu	Kuala Terengganu	Kuala Terengganu				Cabang Tiga	FT 14 Malaysia Federal Route 14 – Jerangau, Kuala Berang, Gua Musang, Kenyir Lake, Bandar Al-Muktafi Billah Shah, Bukit Besi, Kuantan	Junctions
Terengganu	Kuala Terengganu	Kuala Terengganu				Giant Hypermarket Kuala Terengganu		
Terengganu	Kuala Terengganu	Kuala Terengganu				Mydin Mall		
Terengganu	Kuala Terengganu	Kuala Terengganu				Jalan Tengku Mizan	FT 65 Jalan Tengku Mizan – Kota Bharu, Seberang Takir, Sultan Mahmud Airport	T-junctions
Terengganu	Kuala Terengganu	Kuala Terengganu				MAIAIT building	Majlis Agama Islam dan Adat Istiadat Terengganu (MAIAIT)	
Terengganu	Kuala Terengganu	Kuala Terengganu				Kuala Terengganu High Court Building		
Terengganu	Kuala Terengganu	Kuala Terengganu				Kuala Terengganu	Jalan Bukit Kechil – Hiliran	T-junctions
Terengganu	Kuala Terengganu	Kuala Terengganu				Kuala Terengganu	Jalan Pasir Panjang – Panjang Panjang	T-junctions
Terengganu	Kuala Terengganu	Kuala Terengganu				Kuala Terengganu; Jalan Sultan Omar I/S	Jalan Sultan Omar – City Centre; Jalan Panji Alam – Gemia	Junctions
Terengganu	Kuala Terengganu	Kuala Terengganu				Kuala Terengganu; Batu Burok	FT 174 Malaysia Federal Route 174 – City Centre, Sultanah Nur Zahirah Hospital, Istana Maziah, Masjid Abidin; Jalan Pantai Batu Burok – Pantai Batu Burok	Junctions
Terengganu	Kuala Terengganu	Kuala Terengganu				Tengku Tengah Zaharah Mosque	Tengku Tengah Zaharah Mosque, Kuala Ibai Lagoon Park	
Terengganu	Kuala Terengganu	Kuala Terengganu			Chendering River Bridge; Cendering Bridge			
Terengganu	Kuala Terengganu	Kuala Terengganu				Cendering	T100 Jalan Kedai Buluh – Kedai Buluh, Ajil; FT 459 Malaysia Federal Route 459 – Pantai Pandak, Chendering Recreational Area, Cendering Fishing Base, Terengganu State Department of Fisheriers, Fisheries Research Institute, Marin Fisheriers Development and Management Department	Junctions
Terengganu	Marang	Marang	523.3	325.2		Marang	Marang Ferry Terminal (Ferry to Kapas Island)	
Terengganu	Marang	Marang	522.6	324.7	Marang River Bridge			
Terengganu	Marang	Marang	518.8	322.4		Kampung Ru Muda	Rhu Muda Recreational Park	
Terengganu	Marang	Marang	514.6	319.8		Alur Tuman		
Terengganu	Marang	Marang	510.5	317.2		Kampung Pulau Kerengga	Pulau Kerengga Recreational Park	
Terengganu	Marang	Merchang	501.3	311.5		Merchang	Merchang Beach	
Terengganu	Marang	Merchang	494.2	307.1		Kampung Pasir Putih		
Terengganu	Marang	Merchang	481.9	299.4		Kampung Jambu Bongkok	Hutan Lipur Jambu Bongkok	
Terengganu	Dungun	Rantau Abang	479.9	298.2	Turtle Conservation and Information Centre			
Terengganu	Dungun	Rantau Abang	473.3	294.1		Pantai Batu Pelandok (Pantai Kuala Abang)		
Terengganu	Dungun	Rantau Abang				Rantau Abang	Rantau Abang – Rantau Abang Turtle Hatchery Centre	
Terengganu	Dungun	Rantau Abang	471.0	292.7		Tanjung Jara Beach	Tanjung Jara Beach, Pantai Teluk Bidara	
Terengganu	Dungun	Rantau Abang				Tanjung Jara		
Terengganu	Dungun	Rantau Abang				Kampung Kuala Abang		
Terengganu	Dungun	Kuala Dungun	466.0	289.6	Sungai Dungun Bridge			
Terengganu	Dungun	Kuala Dungun			Railway crossing bridge			
Terengganu	Dungun	Kuala Dungun				Bukit Besi Highway	FT 132 Malaysia Federal Route 132 – Bukit Besi, Jerangau	T-junctions
Terengganu	Dungun	Kuala Dungun	462.7	287.5		Kuala Dungun	FT 127 Malaysia Federal Route 127 – Town centre, Pantai Sura, Pantai Teluk Lipat	T-junctions
Terengganu	Dungun	Kuala Dungun				Kampung Sura Masjid		
Terengganu	Dungun	Kuala Dungun				Jalan Sura	T116 Jalan Sura – Sura, Taman Tasik Tanjung Sura, Pantai Teluk Gadong, Hutan Lipur Tanjung Gadong	T-junctions
Terengganu	Dungun	Kuala Dungun				Jalan Bukit Bauk	Jalan Bukit Bauk – Rimba Bandar Bukit Bauk	T-junctions
Terengganu	Dungun	Paka				Jalan Durian Mentangau	T118 Jalan Durian Mentangu – Kampung Durian Mentangu, Rasau Kerteh Bandar B1, Ketengah Jaya	T-junctions
Terengganu	Dungun	Paka				Kampung Gong Gemuruh		
Terengganu	Dungun	Paka	442.5	275.0	Sungai Paka Bridge			
Terengganu	Dungun	Paka				Paka	Kuala Paka Beach	
Terengganu	Dungun	Paka				Paka		
Terengganu	Dungun	Paka				Paka; Ketengah Highway	FT 122 Malaysia Federal Route 122 – Bandar Al-Muktafi Billah Shah, Bandar Ketengah Jaya; East Coast Expressway – Kuala Terengganu, Kuala Lumpur	T-junctions
Terengganu	Dungun	Paka				Paka		
Terengganu	Dungun	Paka				Masjid Taman Hadhari		
Terengganu	Dungun	Paka				U-Turn		
Terengganu	Kemaman	Kerteh	438.4	272.4		Sultan Ismail Power Station	Sultan Ismail Power Station; YTL Power Station	T-junctions
Terengganu	Kemaman	Kerteh				U-Turn		
Terengganu	Kemaman	Kerteh				Petronas Oil and Gas Refinery	Petronas Oil and Gas Refinery – Petronas Oil Refinery, Petronas Gas Refinery, Petronas Terminal	Junctions
Terengganu	Kemaman	Kerteh				Kampung Seberang		
Terengganu	Kemaman	Kerteh				Kampung Seberang	Penyu Ma'Daerah Conservation Centre	
Terengganu	Kemaman	Kerteh				Kampung Labohan		
Terengganu	Kemaman	Kerteh			Sungai Kerteh bridge			
Terengganu	Kemaman	Kerteh				Kerteh	T127 Jalan Bukit Putih – Bukit Putih, Kerteh Jaya, Kerteh Airport , Town Centre, Pantai Rekreasi Kuala Kerteh	Junctions
Terengganu	Kemaman	Kerteh				Kerteh	T129 Jalan Cabang – Rebah Bangun, Cabang; East Coast Expressway – Kuala Terengganu, Kuala Lumpur	T-junctions
Terengganu	Kemaman	Kerteh				Rantau Petronas	Rantau Petronas – Petronas Complex, Petronas Housing Complex	Junctions
Terengganu	Kemaman	Kemasik				Mesra Mall		
Terengganu	Kemaman	Kemasik				Taping Beach		
Terengganu	Kemaman	Kemasik				Kemasik	T13 Jalan Ibok – Kampung Air Jernih, Bandar Sri Bandi; East Coast Expressway – Kuala Terengganu, Kuala Lumpur	T-junctions
Terengganu	Kemaman	Kemasik				Kemasik Beach		
Terengganu	Kemaman	Kemasik			Kemasik L/B			
Terengganu	Kemaman	Kijal				Jalan Payoh	T120 Jalan Payoh – Payoh, Bandar Sri Bandi, Padang Kubu	T-junctions
Terengganu	Kemaman	Kijal				Kijal	FT 145 Malaysia Federal Route 145 – Teluk Kalung. Kijal, Teluk Kalung Industrial Area	T-junctions
Terengganu	Kemaman	Kijal			Kijal Lemang Stall (No.16-No.21, Southbound)			
Terengganu	Kemaman	Kijal				Jalan Ibuk	T6 Jalan Ibuk – Kampung Ibuk, Teluk Kalung, Kijal, Teluk Kalung Industrial Area	T-junctions
Terengganu	Kemaman	Kijal			Kijal Lemang Stall (Stall No. 1- No.15, Northbound)			
Terengganu	Kemaman	Chukai				Teluk Kalung Bypass	FT 146 Malaysia Federal Route 146 – Teluk Kalung Industrial Area, Terengganu Advance Technical Institute University College (TATI UC)	T-junctions
Terengganu	Kemaman	Chukai				Teluk Kalung MIEL Industrial Area		
Terengganu	Kemaman	Chukai				Kampung Sungai Chukai	FT 145 FT 146 Old Route – Teluk Kalung, Kijal, Teluk Kalung Industrial Area	Junctions
Terengganu	Kemaman	Chukai			Chukai River Bridge			
Terengganu	Kemaman	Chukai			Bakau Tinggi Recreation Area			
Terengganu	Kemaman	Chukai				Chukai	FT 237 Malaysia Federal Route 237 – Padang Air Putih, Chenih, Jabur; East Coast Expressway – Kuala Terengganu, Kuala Lumpur; T124 Jalan Bandar Chukai – Town Centre	Junctions
Terengganu	Kemaman	Chukai				Chukai	Town Centre	
Terengganu	Kemaman	Chukai				Chukai	T135 Jalan Pengkalan Pandan – Kampung Pulau Tempurung	T-junctions
Terengganu	Kemaman	Chukai				Chukai	T124 Jalan Bandar Chukai – Town Centre	T-junctions
Terengganu	Kemaman	Chukai			Sungai Kemaman Bridge			
Terengganu	Kemaman	Chukai				Jalan Mak Lagam	FT 2686 Jalan Mak Lagam – Padang Air Putih, Chenih, Jabur, Kolej Kemahiran Tinggi MARA (KKTM) Kemaman	T-junctions
Terengganu	Kemaman	Chukai				Jalan Kuala Kemaman	Jalan Kuala Kemaman – Kuala Kemaman, Pantai Teluk Mak Nik (Monica Bay)	T-junctions
Terengganu	Kemaman	Chukai				Masjid Geliga Kemaman		
Terengganu	Kemaman	Chukai				Geliga	Jalan Kuala Kemaman – Kuala Kemaman, Pantai Teluk Mak Nik (Monica Bay)	Junctions
Terengganu	Kemaman	Chukai				INTAN East Coast Campus	National Institute of Public Administration {East Coast Campus) – Main Gate	
Terengganu	Kemaman	Chukai				Jalan Paya Berenjut	Jalan Paya Berenjut – Paya Berenjut, Mak Lagam	T-junctions
Terengganu-Pahang border					Terengganu Border Arch			
Pahang	Kuantan	Chendor				Chendor	Chendor Beach	T-junctions
Pahang	Kuantan	Chendor				Suria Cherating Beach Resort		
Pahang	Kuantan	Chendor			Bandar Baru Chendor RSA			
Pahang	Kuantan	Chendor				Bandar Baru Chendor		
Pahang	Kuantan	Cherating				Impiana Resort Cherating		
Pahang	Kuantan	Cherating				Kampung Cherating		
Pahang	Kuantan	Cherating				Cherating Turtle Sanctuary; Club Med Cherating	Cherating Turtle Sanctuary; Club Med Cherating	T-junctions
Pahang	Kuantan	Cherating				Cherating	Cherating Beach	T-junctions
Pahang	Kuantan	Cherating			Sungai Cherating bridge			
Pahang	Kuantan	Cherating				The Legend Cherating		
Pahang	Kuantan	Cherating				Holiday Villa Cherating		
Pahang	Kuantan	Cherating			Sungai Ular Village Shop			
Pahang	Kuantan	Cherating				Kampung Sungai Ular		
Pahang	Kuantan	Gebeng				Kampung Gebeng		
Pahang	Kuantan	Gebeng				Gebeng Bypass	FT 101 / AH141 Gebeng Bypass – Jabur, Kuantan, Bandar Indera Mahkota, Sultan Haji Ahmad Shah Airport, Malaysian Maritime Enforcement Agency (MMEA) (Akademi Maritim Sultan Ahmad Shah (AMSAS)) East Coast Expressway / AH141 – Kuala Lumpur, Kuala Terengganu	Trumpet interchange
Pahang	Kuantan	Gebeng				MPE Factory		T-junctions
Pahang	Kuantan	Gebeng				Kuantan Port	Kuantan Port Road – Kuantan Port, Tanjung Gelang, TLDM Tanjung Gelang Naval Base	T-junctions
Pahang	Kuantan	Gebeng			Railway crossing bridge			
Pahang	Kuantan	Gebeng				Gebeng Quarry Mines		
Pahang	Kuantan	Gebeng				Gebeng Industrial Area	FT 3485 Jalan Gebeng 1/11 – Gebeng Industrial Area, BASF-Petronas petrochemicals plant	T-junctions
Pahang	Kuantan	Gebeng				Gebeng	FT 2 Jalan Beserah – Kuantan Port, Tanjung Gelang, TLDM Tanjung Gelang Naval Base, Beserah, Kuantan	T-junctions
Pahang	Kuantan	Kuantan				Gebeng–Kuantan Airport	see also Kuantan Bypass	
Pahang	Kuantan	Kuantan				Kuantan Airport–Kuantan	see also FT 2 Gambang–Kuantan Highway	
Pahang	Kuantan	Kuantan				Penor	FT 183 Malaysia Federal Route 183 – Kuantan, Tanjung Lumpur	T-junctions
Pahang	Kuantan	Kuantan				Penor Prison		
Pahang	Pekan	Pekan				Kampung Ubai	FT 230 Malaysia Federal Route 230 – Ceruk Paluh, Penor Beach	T-junctions
Pahang	Pekan	Pekan				Kampung Gembuang	C103 Pahang State Route C103 – Kampung Pahang Tua, Kampung Langgar	T-junctions
Pahang	Pekan	Pekan				Kampung Tanah Puteh	C101 Pahang State Route C101 – Tanjung Selangor, Pulau Serai	T-junctions
Pahang	Pekan	Pekan				Pekan Industrial Area		
Pahang	Pekan	Pekan				Kampung Jambu	C103 Pahang State Route C103 – Kampung Pahang Tua, Kampung Langgar	T-junctions
Pahang	Pekan	Pekan				IKM Tan Sri Yahaya Ahmad	Institut Kemahiran Mara (IKM) Tan Sri Yahaya Ahmad	
Pahang	Pekan	Pekan				Kampung Kubang Sawa		
Pahang	Pekan	Pekan				Kampung Batu Satu Peramu		
Pahang	Pekan	Pekan				Jalan Kuala Pahang	C102 Pahang State Route C102 – Kuala Pahang	T-junctions
Pahang	Pekan	Pekan			Pahang River Bridge; Abu Bakar Bridge (Length: 600 m)			
Pahang	Pekan	Pekan				Kampung Sungai Madulang		
Pahang	Pekan	Pekan			Sungai Madulang bridge			
Pahang	Pekan	Pekan				Masjid Baru Bandar Pekan		
Pahang	Pekan	Pekan				Pekan	FT 82 Malaysia Federal Route 82 – Paluh Hinai, Gambang	T-junctions
Pahang	Pekan	Pekan				SMS Sultan Haji Ahmad Shah	Sekolah Menengah Sains Sultan Haji Ahmad Shah	
Pahang	Pekan	Pekan				Pekan Museum		
Pahang	Pekan	Pekan				Pekan; Seri Terentang	Jalan Sultan Ahmad – Town Centre, Abu Bakar Royal Mosque (Abdullah Mosque); Jalan Seri Terentang – Istana Abu Bakar, Pekan, Royal Pahang Polo Club	Junctions
Pahang	Pekan	Pekan				Pekan; Town centre	Jalan Sultan Abdullah – Pekan Hospital	Junctions
Pahang	Pekan	Pekan				Kampung Ketapang Tengah		
Pahang	Pekan	Pekan				Sungai Habib Hassan		
Pahang	Pekan	Pekan				Kampung Ketapang	C100 Pahang State Route C100 – Sungai Pak Leh, Tanjung Agas	T-junctions
Pahang	Pekan	Pekan				Kampung Ketapang Hilir		
Pahang	Pekan	Pekan				Kampung Alor Akar		
Pahang	Pekan	Pekan				Kampung Keledang		
Pahang	Pekan	Pekan				Kampung Alor Pasir		
Pahang	Pekan	Pekan				Permatang Pauh		
Pahang	Pekan	Pekan				Permatang Bercair		
Pahang	Pekan	Pekan				Kampung Kalung		
Pahang	Pekan	Pekan				Kampung Sungai Air Tawar		
Pahang	Pekan	Pekan				Kampung Batu Lancang		
Pahang	Pekan	Pekan				Kampung Baharu		
Pahang	Pekan	Pekan			Sungai Beto bridge			
Pahang	Pekan	Pekan				Kampung Batu Enam Belas		
Pahang	Pekan	Pekan				Kampung Hulu Tering		
Pahang	Pekan	Pekan				Kampung Tanjung Batu		
Pahang	Pekan	Pekan			Sungai Tering bridge			
Pahang	Pekan	Pekan				Kampung Tering		
Pahang	Pekan	Pekan				Nenasi		
Pahang	Pekan	Pekan			Sungai Nenasi bridge			
Pahang	Pekan	Pekan				Kampung Merawan		
Pahang	Pekan	Pekan				Kampung Pandan		
Pahang	Pekan	Pekan				Kampung Serun		
Pahang	Pekan	Pekan				Kampung Serul		
Pahang	Pekan	Pekan				Kampung Palas		
Pahang	Pekan	Pekan				Kubang Lapan		
Pahang	Pekan	Pekan				Kampung Kajang		
Pahang	Pekan	Pekan				Kampung Singir		
Pahang	Pekan	Pekan			Sungai Merchung bridge			
Pahang	Pekan	Pekan				Merchung		
Pahang	Rompin	Kuala Rompin				Permatang Sebayan		
Pahang	Rompin	Kuala Rompin				Kampung Sebayan Baru		
Pahang	Rompin	Kuala Rompin				Kampung Menchali		
Pahang	Rompin	Kuala Rompin				Kampung Leban Chondong	FT 63 Malaysia Federal Route 63 – Bandar Muadzam Shah, Segamat, Gambang	T-junctions
Pahang	Rompin	Kuala Rompin				Kampung Sabak	C110 Jalan Kampung Sabak – Kampung Sabak, Kampung Lanjut	T-junctions
Pahang	Rompin	Kuala Rompin				Kampung Ayau		
Pahang	Rompin	Kuala Rompin			Sungai Rompin Bridge			
Pahang	Rompin	Kuala Rompin				Kampung Tebu Hitam		
Pahang	Rompin	Kuala Rompin				Bandar Baru Rompin	C112 Jalan Kuala Rompin – Kuala Rompin, Kuala Rompin Ferry Terminal (Ferry to Tioman Island)	T-junctions
Pahang	Rompin	Kuala Rompin				Kampung Sepakat Barat		
Pahang	Rompin	Kuala Rompin				Kampung Sepakat Timur		
Pahang	Rompin	Kuala Rompin			Sungai Pontian bridge			
Pahang	Rompin	Kuala Rompin				Sungai Pontian		
Pahang	Rompin	Kuala Rompin				Jalan Selendang	FT 2488 C105 Jalan Selendang – FELDA Selendang, Kampung Sepayang, Endau-Rompin National Park	T-junctions
Pahang	Rompin	Kuala Rompin				Kampung Selendang		
Pahang	Rompin	Kuala Rompin				Kampung Parit Raja		
Pahang	Rompin	Kuala Rompin				Jalan Kuala Pontian	C116 Jalan Kuala Pontian – Kuala Pontian	T-junctions
Pahang	Rompin	Kuala Rompin				Kampung Orang Asli Batu 8 Rompin		
Pahang	Rompin	Kuala Rompin				Kampung Batu Tujuh		
Pahang	Rompin	Kuala Rompin				Kampung Janglau Pantai		
Pahang	Rompin	Kuala Rompin				Kampung Jawa		
Pahang	Rompin	Kuala Rompin				Kampung Serinkin		
Pahang	Rompin	Kuala Rompin				Kampung Teluk Gading Barat		
Pahang	Rompin	Kuala Rompin				Tanjung Gemok	Tanjung Gemok Ferry Terminal (Ferry to Tioman Island)	
Pahang-Johor border					Endau Bridge; Sungai Endau bridge (Length: 200 m)			
Johor	Mersing	Endau				Endau	Jalan Pekan Endau – Town Centre	T-junctions
Johor	Mersing	Endau				Jalan Penyabong	J182 Johor State Route J182 – Penyabong, Penyabong Beach	T-junctions
Johor	Mersing	Endau				Kampung Sungai Padang		
Johor	Mersing	Endau				Kampung Londang Batu		
Johor	Mersing	Endau				Kampung Ayer Tawar		
Johor	Mersing	Endau				FELDA Endau		
Johor	Mersing	Mersing				Gunung Arong Recreational Forest		
Johor	Mersing	Mersing				Kampung Tenglu Batu Enam		
Johor	Mersing	Mersing				Kampung Jawa		
Johor	Mersing	Mersing			Sungai Tenglu Besar bridge			
Johor	Mersing	Mersing				Tenglu		
Johor	Mersing	Mersing				Jalan Air Papan	J79 Jalan Air Papan – Air Papan, Air Papan Beach	T-junctions
Johor	Mersing	Mersing				Kampung Batu Empat Setengah		
Johor	Mersing	Mersing				Kampung Tenglu Kechil		
Johor	Mersing	Mersing				Kampung Sawah Dato		
Johor	Mersing	Mersing				Taman Intan Jaya		
Johor	Mersing	Mersing				Kampung Makam		
Johor	Mersing	Mersing				Kampung Seri Lalang		
Johor	Mersing	Mersing				Mersing; Kampung Mersing Kanan		
Johor	Mersing	Mersing				Mersing; Mersing Airport		
Johor	Mersing	Mersing			Sungai Mersing Bridge			
Johor	Mersing	Mersing				Mersing; Mersing Roundabout	Jalan Abu Bakar – Town Centre, Mersing Stadium, Mersing Ferry Terminal (Ferry to Tioman Island, and other surrounding areas); Mersing R/R – Tourist Information Centre; Jalan Hospital – Town Centre, Masjid Jamek Mersing, Mersing District and Land Office, Federal Government Complex, Mersing Hospital	Roundabout
Johor	Mersing	Mersing				Mersing; Mersing Kechil		
Johor	Mersing	Mersing				Mersing; Jalan Kampung Pengkalan Batu	FT 1425 Jalan Kampung Pengkalan Batu – Kampung Pengkalan Batu, Jalan Haji Haron, FELDA Nitar, Kahang, Kluang, Ayer Hitam, Batu Pahat; North–South Expressway Southern Route / AH2 – Kuala Lumpur, Johor Bahru	T-junctions
Johor	Mersing	Mersing				Mersing; Taman Wawasan Mersing		
Johor	Mersing	Mersing				Mersing; Taman Seri Mersing		
Johor	Mersing	Mersing				Mersing; Sri Pantai	J180 Jalan Sri Pantai – Kampung Teluk Iskandar, Kampung Sri Pantai	T-junctions
Johor	Mersing	Mersing				MRSM Mersing	Maktab Rendah Sains MARA (MRSM) Mersing	
Johor	Mersing	Mersing				Kampung Wak Salam Batu Tujoh		
Johor	Mersing	Jemaluang				Jemaluang	FT 50 Malaysia Federal Route 50 – Kahang, Kluang, Ayer Hitam, Batu Pahat; North–South Expressway Southern Route / AH2 – Kuala Lumpur, Johor Bahru	T-junctions
Johor	Mersing	Jemaluang			Road Transport Department (JPJ) enforcement stations			
Johor	Mersing	Jemaluang			Sungai Ambat bridge			
Johor	Mersing	Jemaluang				Sungai Ambat		
Johor	Mersing	Jemaluang				Jalan Utama Tenggaroh	FT 1393 Malaysia Federal Route 1393 – Tenggaroh, Tanjung Leman, Tanjung Leman Ferry Terminal (Ferry to Sibu Island, and other surrounding areas)	T-junctions
Johor	Mersing-Kota Tinggi district border				Sungai Sedili Besar Bridge			
Johor	Kota Tinggi	Sedili				Sedili Estate		
Johor	Kota Tinggi	Sedili				FELCRA Sedili		
Johor	Kota Tinggi	Sedili				Sedili Estate		
Johor	Kota Tinggi	Sedili				Kompleks Jabatan Hutan Ulu Sedili		
Johor	Kota Tinggi	Sedili			Sungai Dohol bridge			
Johor	Kota Tinggi	Sedili			Historical British Army Bunkers (Sedili Bunkers); Historical site during World War II; Historical site			
Johor	Kota Tinggi	Kota Tinggi			Sungai Mupor bridge			
Johor	Kota Tinggi	Kota Tinggi				Kampung Haji Mohd Jambi	FT 99 Malaysia Federal Route 99 – Sedili, Tanjung Sedili, Waha, Lok Heng, Bandar Penawar, Teluk Mahkota, Desaru	T-junctions
Johor	Kota Tinggi	Kota Tinggi				Jalan Perani	J179 Jalan Perani – Perani, Waha, Lok Heng, Sedili, Bandar Mas, Bandar Penawar	T-junctions
Johor	Kota Tinggi	Kota Tinggi				Hutan Lipur Panti		
Johor	Kota Tinggi	Kota Tinggi				Kota Tinggi Bypass	see also Kota Tinggi Bypass	
Johor	Kota Tinggi	Kota Tinggi				Kota Tinggi Bypass–Johor Bahru	see also Johor Bahru–Kota Tinggi Highway	
1.000 mi = 1.609 km; 1.000 km = 0.621 mi: Concurrency terminus

=== Kota Tinggi Original Route ===
The entire route is located in Kota Tinggi District, Johor.

Location	km	mi	Exit	Name	Destinations	Notes
Kota Tinggi				Kota Tinggi Bypass	FT 3 / AH18 Kota Tinggi Bypass – Kulai, Ulu Tiram, Pasir Gudang, Johor Bahru, Singapore	LILO
Kota Tinggi				Kota Tinggi; Pengerang Highway	FT 92 Pengerang Highway – Pengerang, Sungai Rengit, Bandar Penawar, Desaru, Kota Tinggi Museum	T-junctions
Kota Tinggi				Kota Tinggi; Jalan Lukut-Jalan Kampung Makam	J175 Jalan Lukut – Kampung Lukut; J175 Jalan Kampung Makam – Kampung Makam, Sultan Mahmud Mangkat Di Julang Mausoleum, Kota Makam Tauhid, Makam Tun Habab/Habib	T-junctions
Kota Tinggi	39.0	24.2	327	Kota Tinggi; Kota Tinggi	FT 91 Malaysia Federal Route 91 – Bandar Tenggara, Kluang, Kota Tinggi waterfall Jalan Ibrahim – Jalan Sungai Kewang, Kampung Kelantan, Makam Laksamana Bentan	T-junctions
Kota Tinggi	38.5	23.9	Sungai Johor bridge Kota Bridge, Kota Tinggi			
Kota Tinggi				Kota Tinggi; Kampung Sri Lalang	Jalan Kampung Tembioh – Jalan Wayang, Makam Cik Siti Aminah	T-junctions
Kota Tinggi				Kota Tinggi; SMK Tun Habab		
Kota Tinggi				Kota Tinggi; Kampung Sri Lalang		
Kota Tinggi				Kota Tinggi; Taman Sri Lalang		T-junctions
Kota Tinggi				Kota Tinggi; Legaran Kota		T-junctions
Kota Tinggi				Kota Tinggi; Taman Sri Lalang		T-junctions
Kota Tinggi				Kota Tinggi; Taman Daiman Jaya		
Kota Tinggi				Kota Tinggi; Kampung Batu Dua Puluh Lima		
Kota Tinggi			326	Jalan Tai Hong I/S	Jalan Tai Hong – Tai Hong	T-junctions
Kota Tinggi				Kota Tinggi rifle range	Kota Tinggi rifle range	T-junctions
Kota Tinggi				Johor Bahru–Kota Tinggi Highway	FT 3 / AH18 Johor Bahru–Kota Tinggi Highway – Kulai, Ulu Tiram, Pasir Gudang, Tebrau, Johor Bahru, Singapore	T-junctions
1.000 mi = 1.609 km; 1.000 km = 0.621 mi: Incomplete access

== See also ==
- Malaysia Federal Route 5 – the west coastal counterpart of the Federal Route 3
- Asian Highway Network
- AH18
- Malaysian Federal Roads system
