= Kemaman Bypass =

Road in Malaysia

Federal Routes 145 and 146
- Kijal Bypass

Route information
- Maintained by Malaysian Public Works Department
- Length: 15.70 km (9.76 mi)
- Existed: 1986–present
- History: Completed in 1988

Major junctions
- North end: Kijal
- FT 3 / AH18 Federal Route 3
- South end: Kampung Sungai Chukai

Location
- Country: Malaysia
- Primary destinations: Kuala Terengganu, Dungun, Kerteh, Kuantan, Chukai

Highway system
- Highways in Malaysia; Expressways; Federal; State

Kijal Bypass, Federal Route 145 and 146, is a major highway bypass in Kemaman district, Terengganu, Malaysia. Route FT145 has a length of 15.70. FT146 has a length of 1.79 km. On 31 March 2023, the entire route FT145 has been gazetted as FT3, while the original FT3 that passes through Kijal and Teluk Kalong was rerouted as FT145.

The Kilometre Zero of the Federal Route 145 starts at Kampung Sungai Chukai. The Kilometre Zero of the Federal Route 146 starts at Kampung Panchur.

== Features ==
At most sections, the Federal Route 145 and 146 was built under the JKR R5 road standard, with a speed limit of 90 km/h.

== Junction lists ==
The entire route is located in Kemaman District, Terengganu.

Legend:

- I/C - Interchange, I/S - Intersection, RSA - Rest and service area, OBR - Overhead bridge restaurant, R/R - Restaurant and rest plaza, L/B - Layby, V/P - Vista point, TN - tunnel, T/P - Toll plaza, BR - Bridge
- C - Cloverleaf, S - Stack, T-A - Trumpet-A, T-B - Trumpet-B, DT - Directional-T/Y, SDT - Semi-Directional-T/Y, P-Y - Partial-Y, D - Diamond, P-C - Partial cloverleaf, D-D - Diverging diamond, D-R - Direct ramp

=== Federal Route 145 and 146 (Current) ===
Km	Exit	Name	Destinations	Notes
		Kemaman Bypass	FT 3 / AH18 Malaysia Federal Route 3 – Kuantan, Chukai	Junctions
		Kijal	Pantai Kijal, Awana Kijal Resort	T-junctions
		Teluk Kalung Industrial Area	T6 Jalan Ibuk – Kampung Ibuk, Bukit Kemuning, Rekreasi Bukit kemuning	Junctions
		Teluk Kalung Industrial Area	Perwaja Steel Mill, Kemaman Port, Pantai Marina, Telaga Simpul Recreation Area	T-junctions
		Teluk Kalung	Petronas Gas Operational Centre, Teluk Kalung Recreational Park	
		Kampung Pancur		
		Kampung Teluk Kalung; Pantai Teluk Kalong	V	
		Kampung Sungai Chukai	FT 3 / AH18 Malaysia Federal Route 3 – Kuala Terengganu, Dungun, Kerteh	Junctions
