= Malaysia Federal Route 122 =

Road in Malaysia

Federal Route 122
- Ketengah Highway; Jalan Jerangau-Jabor (Penghantar 5)

Route information
- Maintained by Malaysian Public Works Department
- Length: 28.70 km (17.83 mi)

Major junctions
- West end: Bandar Al-Muktafi Billah Shah
- FT 14 Federal Route 14; FT 123 Federal Route 123; East Coast Expressway; FT 125 Federal Route 125 FT 3 / AH18 Federal Route 3
- East end: Paka

Location
- Country: Malaysia
- Primary destinations: Bandar Ketengah Jaya

Highway system
- Highways in Malaysia; Expressways; Federal; State

Federal Route 122, or Ketengah Highway and Jalan Jerangau-Jabor (Penghantar 5), is a major highway in Terengganu, Malaysia. "Ketengah" stands for "Lembaga Kemajuan Terengganu Tengah" or Central Terengganu Development Authority.

The Kilometre Zero of the Federal Route 122 starts at Paka.

At most sections, the Federal Route 122 was built under the JKR R5 road standard, allowing maximum speed limit of up to 90 km/h (56 mph).

== Junction lists ==
The entire route is located in Dungun District, Terengganu.

Legend:

- I/C - Interchange, I/S - Intersection, RSA - Rest and service area, OBR - Overhead bridge restaurant, R/R - Restaurant and rest plaza, L/B - Layby, V/P - Vista point, TN - tunnel, T/P - Toll plaza, BR - Bridge
- C - Cloverleaf, S - Stack, T-A - Trumpet-A, T-B - Trumpet-B, DT - Directional-T/Y, SDT - Semi-Directional-T/Y, P-Y - Partial-Y, D - Diamond, P-C - Partial cloverleaf, D-D - Diverging diamond, D-R - Direct ramp

Location	km	mi	Name	Destinations	Notes
Bandar Al-Muktafi Billah Shah	28.7	17.8	Bandar Al-Muktafi Billah Shah	FT 14 Malaysia Federal Route 14 – Kuala Terengganu, Bukit Besi, Bandar Al-Muktafi Billah Shah, Bandar Chenih Baharu, Jabur, Kuantan	T-junctions
Bandar Ketengah Jaya			Sungai Apu bridge		
Bandar Ketengah Jaya			Bandar Ketengah Jaya	Town Centre	T-junctions
Bandar Ketengah Jaya			Sungai Rasau bridge		
Paka			Jalan Rasau Kerteh Selatan	FT 123 Malaysia Federal Route 123 – Rasau Kerteh Bandar B2	T-junctions
Paka			Paka-ECE	East Coast Expressway – Kuala Terengganu, Bukit Besi, Dungun, Kerteh, Kuantan, Kuala Lumpur	T-junctions
Paka			Jalan Rasau Kerteh Utara	FT 125 Malaysia Federal Route 125 – Rasau Kerteh Bandar B1	T-junctions
Paka			TNB Staff Quarters		
Paka	0.0	0.0	Paka	FT 3 / AH18 Malaysia Federal Route 3 – Kuala Terengganu, Dungun, Rantau Petronas, Kerteh, Chukai, Kuantan, Petronas Oil and Gas Refinery, Sultan Ismail Power Station	T-junctions
1.000 mi = 1.609 km; 1.000 km = 0.621 mi
