= Malaysia Federal Route 125 =

Road in Malaysia

Federal Route 125
- Jalan Rasau Kerteh Utara; Jalan Jerangau-Jabor (Penghantar 3)

Route information
- Length: 6.80 km (4.23 mi)

Major junctions
- North end: Rasau Kerteh Bandar B1
- T118 Jalan Durian Mentangu; FT 122 Ketengah Highway
- South end: Bandar Ketengah Jaya

Location
- Country: Malaysia

Highway system
- Highways in Malaysia; Expressways; Federal; State

Federal Route 125, or Jalan Rasau Kerteh Utara and Jalan Jerangau-Jabor (Penghantar 3), is a federal road in Terengganu, Malaysia.

== Features ==
At most sections, the Federal Route 125 was built under the JKR R5 road standard, allowing maximum speed limit of up to 90 km/h.

== List of junctions and towns ==
Km	Exit	Junctions	To	Remarks
		Rasau Kerteh Bandar B1	Town centre Sekolah Kebangsaan Rasau Kerteh Bandar B1; Sekolah Menengah Kebangsaan Rasau Kerteh Bandar B1	
		Rasau Kerteh Bandar B1	Northeast; T118 Jalan Durian Mentangu; Kampung Durian Mentangu; Sura; Dungun	T-junctions
		Bandar Ketengah Jaya	FT 122 Ketengah Highway West; FT 122 Bandar Al-Muktafi Billah Shah; FT 14 Kuala Terengganu; FT 14 Kuantan; East Coast Expressway East Coast Expressway; Kuala Terengganu; Kuantan; Kuala Lumpur East; FT 122 Paka; FT 3 AH18 Dungun; FT 3 AH18 Kerteh; FT 3 AH18 Chukai (Kemaman)	Junctions
