= Malaysia Federal Route 123 =

Road in Malaysia

Federal Route 123
- Jalan Rasau Kerteh Selatan; Jalan Jerangau-Jabor (Penghantar 4)

Route information
- Length: 7.83 km (4.87 mi)

Major junctions
- North end: Bandar Ketengah Jaya
- FT 122 Ketengah Highway
- South end: Rasau Kerteh Bandar B2

Location
- Country: Malaysia

Highway system
- Highways in Malaysia; Expressways; Federal; State

Federal Route 123, or Jalan Rasau Kerteh Selatan and Jalan Jerangau-Jabor (Penghantar 4), is a federal road in Terengganu, Malaysia.

== Features ==
At most sections, the Federal Route 123 was built under the JKR R5 road standard, allowing maximum speed limit of up to 90 km/h.

== List of junctions and towns ==
Km	Exit	Junctions	To	Remarks
		FT 122 Ketengah Highway	FT 122 Ketengah Highway West; FT 122 Bandar Al-Muktafi Billah Shah; FT 14 Kuala Terengganu; FT 14 Kuantan East; FT 122 Paka; FT 3 AH18 Dungun; FT 3 AH18 Kerteh; FT 3 AH18 Chukai (Kemaman); East Coast Expressway East Coast Expressway; Kuala Terengganu; Kuantan; Kuala Lumpur	Junctions
		Bandar Ketengah Jaya	Town Centre	
		Rasau Kerteh Bandar B2	Town Centre; Rasau Kerteh Forest Reserve	
