= Malaysia Federal Route 196 =

Road in Malaysia

Federal Route 196
- Jalan Panglima Bayu-Rantau Panjang-Jeram Pendah

Route information
- Length: 37.17 km (23.10 mi)

Major junctions
- South end: Panglima Bayu
- FT 4 AH140 Federal Route 4 FT 3 AH18 Federal Route 3 D23 Jalan Berangan
- North end: Jeram Pendah

Location
- Country: Malaysia
- Primary destinations: Rantau Panjang

Highway system
- Highways in Malaysia; Expressways; Federal; State

Federal Route 196, or Jalan Panglima Bayu-Rantau Panjang-Jeram Pendah (formerly Kelantan State Route D22), is a federal road in Kelantan, Malaysia. It is an alternative route to Tumpat and Pengkalan Kubor from Rantau Panjang. The Kilometre Zero of the Federal Route 196 starts at Panglima Bayu.

== Features ==
- There is a customs checkpoint at Jalan Besar (south section) towards Rantau Panjang town centre.

At most sections, the Federal Route 196 was built under the JKR R5 road standard, allowing maximum speed limit of up to 90 km/h.

== List of junctions and towns ==
Km	Exit	Junctions	To	Remarks
FT 196; 0		Panglima Bayu	West; FT 4 AH140 Gerik; FT 4 AH140 Jeli; FT 4 AH140 Ayer Lanas; FT 4 AH140 Bukit Bunga East; FT 4 AH140 Tanah Merah; FT 4 AH140 Machang; FT 3 AH18 Kuala Terengganu	T-junctions
		Sungai Jedok bridge		
		Kampung Lalang Pepuyu		
		Kampung Rotan Tawar		
		Rantau Panjang	North; FT 196 Jalan Besar; Rantau Panjang Duty Free Zone Customs Checkpoint (Gate 3); Customs; FT 196 Town Centre (South Section) (Duty Free Zone); 4056 AH18 Sungai Golok (Thailand); Zon Duty Free Complex	T-junctions
		Rantau Panjang; Bulatan Banggol Kulim	Jalan Banggol Kulim West; Rantau Panjang Duty Free Zone Customs Checkpoint (Gate 2); Customs; Town Centre (South Section) (Duty Free Zone); 4056 AH18 Sungai Golok (Thailand); Zon Duty Free Complex East; Kampung Banggol Kulim	Roundabout
		Rantau Panjang	Northwest; FT 3 AH18 Town Centre; Rantau Panjang Checkpoint; 4056 AH18 Sungai Golok (Thailand) East; FT 3 AH18 Kota Bharu; FT 3 AH18 Pasir Mas	Junctions
		Railway crossing		
		Rantau Panjang	South; FT 196 Jalan Besar; FT 196 Town Centre (North Section); Rantau Panjang railway station	T-junctions
		Kampung Kedap		
		Kampung Lubok Gong		
		Kampung Che Da'Ah		
		Kampung Terusan		
		Kampung Guntong		
		Kampung Bukit Perdah		
		Kampung Bungor		
		Kampung Banggol Kong		
		Kampung Siram		
		Jeram Perdah	D23 Jalan Berangan North; Kubang Teratai; Gelang Mas; Tumpat; Pengkalan Kubor; Wat Photivihan South; Pasir Mas; Tasik Berangan	T-junctions
