= University College TATI =

University college in Terengganu, Malaysia

- Other name: UC TATI
- Motto: "Spurring Today's Technology for a Sustainable Life"
- Type: Private university
- Established: 11 June 1993
- Chancellor: Y.Bhg Tan Sri Dato' Ir Dr. Wan Abdul Rahman
- Rector: Prof. Dr. Anuar bin Ahmad
- Director: YB Haji Satiful Bahari bin Mamat
- Location: Kemaman, Terengganu, Malaysia
- Campus: Telok Kalong
- Website: www.tatiuc.edu.my

University College TATI (UC TATI), formerly known as Tati University College and Terengganu Advanced Technical Institute, is a state-owned higher education institution located in Kemaman, Terengganu, Malaysia. Founded in 1993 as Terengganu Advanced Technical Institute, it opened in July 1994 in Kuala Terengganu before moving to its permanent campus in Teluk Kalong in Kemaman.
