= Kota Tinggi Bypass =

Road in Malaysia

Federal Route 3
- Kota Tinggi Bypass

Route information
- Part of AH18
- Maintained by Malaysian Public Works Department
- Existed: 1997–present
- History: Completed in 1999

Major junctions
- North end: Kota Tinggi North
- FT 3 / AH18 Federal Route 3 FT 92 Pengerang Highway FT 3 / AH18 Johor Bahru-Kota Tinggi Highway
- South end: Kota Tinggi South

Location
- Country: Malaysia
- Primary destinations: Mersing, Pengerang, Desaru, Tanjung Pengelih, Ulu Tiram, Johor Bahru

Highway system
- Highways in Malaysia; Expressways; Federal; State

Kota Tinggi Bypass, Federal Route 3, AH18, is a major highway bypass in Kota Tinggi District, Johor, Malaysia. It incorporates the second bridge of Kota Tinggi which crosses the Sungai Johor. The main purpose of the construction of this bypass is to reduce traffic congestion at the main bridge of Kota Tinggi town centre.

== Junction lists ==
The entire route is in Kota Tinggi District, Johor.

Legend:

- I/C - Interchange, I/S - Intersection, RSA - Rest and service area, OBR - Overhead bridge restaurant, R/R - Restaurant and rest plaza, L/B - Layby, V/P - Vista point, TN - tunnel, T/P - Toll plaza, BR - Bridge
- C - Cloverleaf, S - Stack, T-A - Trumpet-A, T-B - Trumpet-B, DT - Directional-T/Y, SDT - Semi-Directional-T/Y, P-Y - Partial-Y, D - Diamond, P-C - Partial cloverleaf, D-D - Diverging diamond, D-R - Direct ramp

km	Exit	Name	Destinations	Notes
Through to FT 3 / AH18 Malaysia Federal Route 3
		Jalan Kota Tinggi Lama	FT 3 / AH18 Malaysia Federal Route 3 (Original route) Kota Tinggi Town Centre	Left-in/left-out
	I/S	Kota Tinggi North I/S	FT 92 Pengerang Highway Kota Tinggi Town Centre, Bandar Tenggara, Kluang, Kota Tinggi Waterfall, Muzium Kota Tinggi Museum, Kampung Makam (Sultan Mahmud Mangkat Di Julang Mausoleum), Pengerang, Tanjung Pengelih, Desaru, Royal Malaysian Naval Academy (PULAREK)	Junctions
	L/B	Petronas L/B	Petronas L/B Petronas	
		Taman Indah, Kampung Makam	Jalan Indah Taman Indah, Kampung Makam, Kampung Makam (Sultan Mahmud Mangkat Di Julang Mausoleum)	T-junctions
	BR	Kota Tinggi Second Bridge; Johor River		
		Sungai Johor Estate		
		Kota Tinggi Rifle Range		
	I/S	Kota Tinggi South I/S	FT 3 / AH18 Malaysia Federal Route 3 (Original route) Kota Tinggi Town Centre, Bandar Tenggara, Kluang, Kota Tinggi Waterfall	T-junctions
Through to FT 3 / AH18 Tebrau Highway
