= Pahang State Route C102 =

Road in Malaysia

Pahang Route 102
- Jalan Kuala Pahang

Major junctions
- North end: Jalan Kuantan-Pekan
- FT 3 AH18 Federal route 3 C101 Jalan Tanjung Selangor
- Southeast end: Kuala Pahang

Location
- Country: Malaysia

Highway system
- Highways in Malaysia; Expressways; Federal; State

Jalan Kuala Pahang (Pahang state route C103) is a major road in Pahang, Malaysia which connects Jalan Genting Kelang in the north with Jalan Tuanku Abdul Rahman in the south. It is among the roads that lead northward from the city.

Originally named Pahang Road, Jalan Pahang likely acquired its name due to its directional alignment towards Pahang. At the northern end of Jalan Pahang, there is an interchange that connects to Jalan Gombak, which extends all the way to the border of Pahang.

Given its status as a major road, Jalan Pahang features multiple junctions and intersections. Key interchanges along Jalan Pahang include those with Jalan Tun Razak and the DUKE Expressway (E33). In the southern section, Jalan Pahang intersects with Jalan Tuanku Abdul Rahman at the junction of Jalan Sultan Azlan Shah and Jalan Raja Muda Abdul Aziz.

== List of junctions ==
Km	Exit	Junctions	To	Remarks
		Jalan Kuantan-Pekan	Northwest; FT 3 AH18 Kuantan; FT 3 AH18 Kuala Terengganu Southeast; FT 3 AH18 Pekan; FT 3 AH18 Johor Bahru	T-junctions
		Taman Sri Maulana		
		Kampung Pekan Seberang		
		Kampung Pulau Maulana		
		Kampung Pulau Jawa		
		Kampung Pulau Tambun		
		Kampung Permatang Pasir		
		Kampung Beruas	North; C101 Jalan Tanjung Selangor; Tanjung Selangor; Pulau Serai	T-junctions
		Pahang Old Royal Mausoleum		
		Kampung Marhum		
		Kuala Pahang		
