= Johor State Route J182 =

Road in Malaysia

Johor Route 182
- Jalan Penyabong
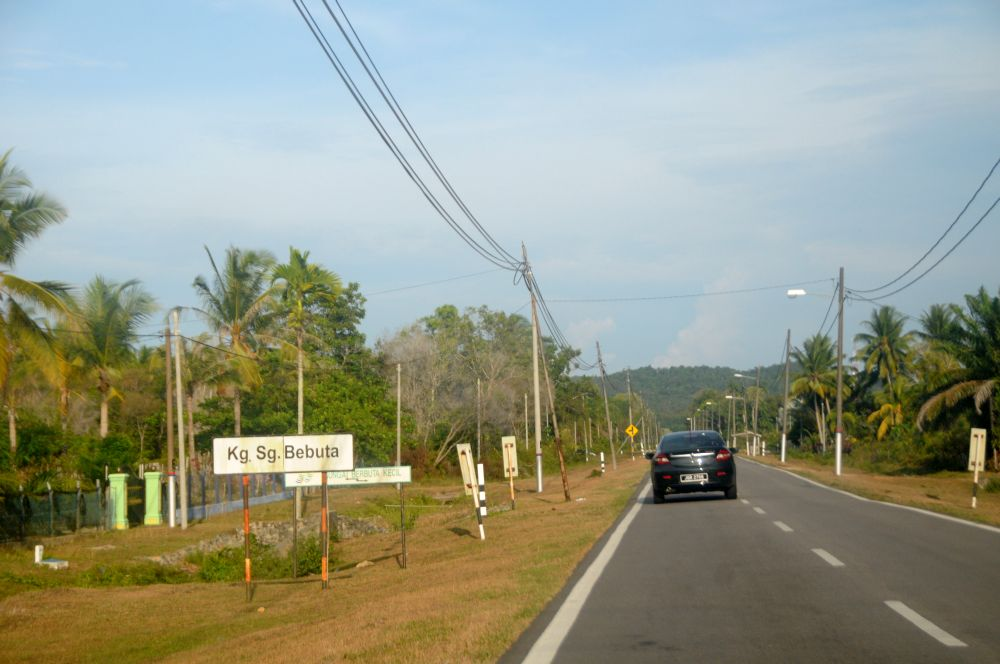

Major junctions
- West end: Endau
- FT 3 (Federal Route 3) / AH18; J183 Jalan Penyabong–Tanjung Resang
- East end: Penyabong Beach

Location
- Country: Malaysia
- Primary destinations: Penyabong

Highway system
- Highways in Malaysia; Expressways; Federal; State

Jalan Penyabong or Jalan Haji Ariffin (Johor State Route J182) is a major road in Johor, Malaysia.

== Features ==
- Main route to famous beach, such as Penyabong Beach and Pasir Lanun Beach.

== Junction lists ==
The entire route is located in Mersing District, Johor.

Legend:

- I/C - Interchange, I/S - Intersection, RSA - Rest and service area, OBR - Overhead bridge restaurant, R/R - Restaurant and rest plaza, L/B - Layby, V/P - Vista point, TN - tunnel, T/P - Toll plaza, BR - Bridge
- C - Cloverleaf, S - Stack, T-A - Trumpet-A, T-B - Trumpet-B, DT - Directional-T/Y, SDT - Semi-Directional-T/Y, P-Y - Partial-Y, D - Diamond, P-C - Partial cloverleaf, D-D - Diverging diamond, D-R - Direct ramp

Location	km	mi	Name	Destinations	Notes
Endau			Endau	FT 3 (Malaysia Federal Route 3) / AH18 – Kuantan, Pekan, Rompin, Mersing, Kota Tinggi, Johor Bahru	T-junctions
Endau			Kampung Sungai Padang		
Endau			Kampung Paya Kasang		
Endau			Kampung Belukat Juling		
Endau			Sungai Takabai Bridge		
Endau			Kampung Sungai Mengkuang		
Endau			Sungai Teriang Kechil Bridge		
Endau			Kampung Teriang Kechil		
Endau			Sungai Lebah Salleh Bridge		
Endau			Sungai Pandak Bridge		
Endau			Kampung Teriang Besar		
Endau			Sungai Teriang Besar Bridge		
Endau			Kampung Sungai Bebuta		
Endau			Kampung Sungai Bebuta Tengah		
Endau			Penyabong	Jalan Kampung Baru – Kampung Teriang Besar; J183 Jalan Penyabong–Tanjung Resang – Kampung Tanjung Resang, Mersing, Teluk Gorek Beach, Air Papan Beach, PLKN	Junctions
Endau			Penyabong Beach	V	
1.000 mi = 1.609 km; 1.000 km = 0.621 mi
