= Malaysia Federal Route 127 =

Road in Malaysia

Federal Route 127
- Jalan Kuala Dungun (Jalan Haji Zainal Abidin)

Route information
- Length: 2.74 km (1.70 mi)

Major junctions
- South end: FT 3 AH18 Jalan Kuala Terengganu-Paka

- FT 3 AH18 Jalan Kuala Terengganu-Paka
- North end: Kuala Dungun

Location
- Country: Malaysia
- Primary destinations: Sura

Highway system
- Highways in Malaysia; Expressways; Federal; State

Jalan Kuala Dungun, or Jalan Haji Zainal Abidin, Federal Route 127, is a federal road in Terengganu, Malaysia. The Kilometre Zero of the Federal Route 127 starts at Jalan Kuala Terengganu-Paka junctions.

At most sections, the Federal Route 127 was built under the JKR R5 road standard, allowing maximum speed limit of up to 90 km/h.

== List of junctions and towns (south-north) ==
Km	Exit	Junctions	To	Remarks
FT 127; 0		Jalan Kuala Terengganu-Paka	North; FT 3 AH18 Kuala Terengganu; FT 3 AH18 Marang; FT 132 Bukit Besi South; FT 3 AH18 Kuantan; FT 3 AH18 Chukai (Kemaman); FT 3 AH18 Paka	T-junctions
		Jalan Sura	T116 Jalan Sura West; Kampung Padang Jambu South; Sura; Pantai Sura	Junctions
		Jalan Bijangga	West; Jalan Bijangga; Dungun Bridge; FT 3 AH18 Kuala Terengganu; Seberang Pintasan; Teluk Bidara; Tanjung Jara East; Pejabat Kesihatan Daerah Dungun	T-junctions
		Kuala Dungun	Dungun District and Land Office; Masjid Dungun	
		Kuala Dungun	Kuala Dungun jetty Keropok Lekor stall	
