= Kota Tinggi Second Bridge =

Bridge in Kota Tinggi, Johor, Malaysia

Sungai Johor Bridge Jambatan Kedua Kota Tinggi
- Coordinates: 1°43′06″N 103°54′26″E
- Carries: Motor vehicles
- Crosses: Johor River
- Locale: Federal Route 3 Kota Tinggi Bypass
- Official name: Kota Tinggi Second Bridge
- Maintained by: Malaysian Public Works Department (JKR) Kota Tinggi; Selia Selenggara Selatan Sdn Bhd

Characteristics
- Design: box girder bridge
- Total length: --
- Width: --
- Longest span: --

History
- Designer: Government of Malaysia; Malaysian Public Works Department (JKR)
- Constructed by: Malaysian Public Works Department (JKR)
- Opened: 1999

The Kota Tinggi Second Bridge (Malay: Jambatan Kedua Kota Tinggi) is a bridge in Kota Tinggi District, Johor, Malaysia. It passes over the Johor River and located at Kota Tinggi Bypass (Federal Route 3). The bridge was opened on 1999 along with the opening of the Kota Tinggi Bypass.

== See also ==
- Transport in Malaysia
