= Pahang State Route C100 =

Road in Malaysia

Pahang Route 100
- Jalan Sungai Pak Leh

Major junctions
- West end: Pekan
- FT 3 AH18 Federal route 3
- East end: Sungai Pak Leh

Location
- Country: Malaysia
- Primary destinations: Kampung Pasir Panjang; Tanjung Agas

Highway system
- Highways in Malaysia; Expressways; Federal; State

Jalan Sungai Pak Leh (Pahang state route C100) is a major road in Pahang, Malaysia.

== List of junctions ==
Km	Exit	Junctions	To	Remarks
		Pekan	West; FT 3 AH18 Pekan town centre FT 82 Paluh Hinai; FT 3 AH18 Kuantan South; FT 3 AH18 Nenasi; FT 3 AH18 Rompin; FT 3 AH18 Mersing; FT 3 AH18 Johor Bahru	T-junctions
		Kampung Ketapang Hilir		
		Kampung Pasir Panjang		
		Tanjung Agas		
		Sungai Pak Leh		
