= WMKE =

WMKE may refer to:

- WMKE-CD, a television station (channel 36, virtual 21) licensed to Milwaukee, Wisconsin, United States
- Kerteh Airport (ICAO code WMKE)
