= Pahang State Route C101 =

Road in Malaysia

Pahang Route 101
- Jalan Tanjung Selangor

Major junctions
- West end: Jalan Kuantan-Pekan
- FT 3 AH18 Federal route 3
- Southeast end: Kampung Beruas

Location
- Country: Malaysia
- Primary destinations: Tanjung Selangor

Highway system
- Highways in Malaysia; Expressways; Federal; State

Jalan Tanjung Selangor (Pahang state route C101) is a major road in Pahang, Malaysia.

== List of junctions ==
Km	Exit	Junctions	To	Remarks
		Jalan Kuantan-Pekan	West; FT 3 AH18 Kuantan; FT 3 AH18 Kuala Terengganu South; FT 3 AH18 Pekan; FT 3 AH18 Johor Bahru	T-junctions
		Kampung Pulau Serai		
		Kampung Bentan		
		Tanjung Selangor		
		Kampung Serandu		
		Kampung Seberang		
		Kampung Beruas	West; C102 Jalan Kuala Pahang; Pekan	T-junctions
