= Kota Bridge, Kota Tinggi =

Sungai Johor Bridge Jambatan Kota, Kota Tinggi جمبتن كوتا، كوتا تيڠڬي
- Coordinates: 1°43′34″N 103°53′56″E
- Carries: Motor vehicles, Pedestrian
- Crosses: Johor River
- Locale: Federal Route 3 Johor Bahru-Kota Tinggi Highway
- Official name: Kota Bridge, Kota Tinggi
- Maintained by: Malaysian Public Works Department (JKR) Kota Tinggi; Selia Selenggara Selatan Sdn Bhd

Characteristics
- Design: box girder bridge
- Total length: --
- Width: --
- Longest span: --

History
- Designer: Government of Malaysia; Malaysian Public Works Department (JKR)
- Constructed by: Malaysian Public Works Department (JKR)
- Opened: 1963

Location
- Interactive map of Sungai Johor Bridge

The Kota Bridge, Kota Tinggi or Jambatan Kota, Kota Tinggi (Jawi: جمبتن كوتا، كوتا تيڠڬي) is the main bridge on Johor River in Kota Tinggi, Johor, Malaysia. It is located at Johor Bahru-Kota Tinggi Highway (Federal Route 3). It was the earliest bridge built in the town. Previously it was a wooden bridge. Then on 1962 the wooden bridge was replaced by the concrete bridge on 1963, and the bridge was officially opened by the Works Minister at that time Tun VT Sambanthan.

== See also ==
- Transport in Malaysia
