= Malaysia Federal Route 459 =

Road in Malaysia

Federal Route 459
- Jalan Pangkalan Ikan Cendering

Route information
- Length: 0.68 km (0.42 mi; 2,200 ft)

Major junctions
- West end: Cendering
- FT 3 AH18 Federal Route 3
- East end: Pangkalan Ikan Cendering

Location
- Country: Malaysia
- Primary destinations: Chedering Beach; Institut Perikanan Malaysia

Highway system
- Highways in Malaysia; Expressways; Federal; State

Jalan Pangkalan Ikan Cendering, Federal Route 459, is an institutional facilities federal road in Kuala Terengganu, Terengganu, Malaysia.

At most sections, the Federal Route 459 was built under the JKR R5 road standard, with a speed limit of 90 km/h.

== List of junctions ==
Km	Exit	Junctions	To	Remarks
		Cendering	North; FT 3 AH18 Jalan Batu Buruk; FT 3 AH18 Kuala Terengganu; FT 3 AH18 Kota Bharu West; T100 Jalan Kedai Buluh; Kedai Buluh; Wakaf Tapai; Ajil South; FT 3 AH18 Jalan Marang; FT 3 AH18 Marang; FT 3 AH18 Dungun; FT 3 AH18 Kuantan	Junctions
		Jalan Pantai Peranginan Chendering	North; Jalan Pantai Peranginan Chendering Pantai Pandak; Cendering Beach; V	T-junctions
Pangkalan Ikan Chendering (Chendering Fishing Base)
		Jabatan Pembangunan Dan Pengurusan Sumber Perikanan Marin		
		Jabatan Perikanan Negeri Terengganu		
		Institut Perikanan Malaysia		
		Pangkalan Ikan Chendering		
