= Bukit Kuang Bridge =

Bridge in Kemaman, Terengganu, Malaysia

Sungai Chukai Bridge Jambatan Bukit Kuang جمبتن بوکيت کواڠ
- Coordinates: 4°15′22″N 103°25′59″E
- Carries: Motor vehicles
- Crosses: Chukai River
- Locale: Federal Route 3 Jalan Penghiburan
- Official name: Jambatan Gelak Gelemak
- Maintained by: Malaysian Public Works Department (JKR) Kemaman; RoadCare Sdn Bhd

Characteristics
- Design: box girder bridge
- Total length: --
- Width: --
- Longest span: --

History
- Designer: Malaysian Public Works Department (JKR)
- Constructed by: Malaysian Public Works Department (JKR); Cergas Murni Sdn Bhd
- Opened: 2014

The Bukit Kuang Bridge (Malay: Jambatan Bukit Kuang) is the main bridge on Chukai River in Kemaman District, Terengganu, Malaysia. It is located at Jalan Penghiburan (Federal Route 3). The bridge was opened on 2014.

== See also ==
- Transport in Malaysia
