= Pasir Puteh Bypass =

Road in Malaysia

Federal Route 210
- Pasir Puteh Bypass

Route information
- Length: 2.43 km (1.51 mi)

Major junctions
- Northwest end: Kampung Cherang Tuli
- FT 3 AH18 Federal Route 3 D20 Jalan Nara
- Southeast end: Kampung Dalam Kemunting

Location
- Country: Malaysia
- Primary destinations: Kota Bharu; Besut; Kuala Terengganu

Highway system
- Highways in Malaysia; Expressways; Federal; State

Pasir Puteh Bypass, Federal Route 210, is a federal road bypass in Pasir Puteh town, Kelantan, Malaysia.

== Features ==
At most sections, the Federal Route 210 was built under the JKR R5 road standard, with a speed limit of 90 km/h.

== List of junctions and towns (northwest-southeast) ==
Km	Exit	Junctions	To	Remarks
		Kampung Cherang Tuli	Northwest; FT 3 AH18 Kota Bharu; FT 3 AH18 Bachok East; FT 3 AH18 Pasir Puteh town centre Hospital Tengku Anis	T-junctions
		Bulatan Jalan Nara	D20 Jalan Nara Northeast; Pasir Puteh town centre Southwest; Kampung Jeram; Gong Kelih; Machang	Roundabout
		Kampung Dalam Kemunting	North; FT 3 AH18 Pasir Puteh town centre South; FT 3 AH18 Kuala Terengganu; FT 3 AH18 Besut	Junctions
