= Kuantan Port Road =

Road in Malaysia

Federal Route --
- Kuantan Port Road; Jalan Pelabuhan Kuantan 关丹港口路

Route information
- Maintained by Malaysian Public Works Department
- Length: 3.68 km (2.29 mi)

Major junctions
- North end: FT 3 / AH18 Federal Route 3
- Jalan Pelabuhan 3/2; Jalan Pelabuhan 3/1; Jalan Pelabuhan 3/3; Jalan Pelabuhan 3/4
- South end: Kuantan Port

Location
- Country: Malaysia

Highway system
- Highways in Malaysia; Expressways; Federal; State

Jalan Pelabuhan Kuantan, formerly Federal Route 421 is a institutional federal road in Pahang, Malaysia.

Jalan Pelabuhan Kuantan was built under the JKR R5 road standard, allowing a maximum speed limit of up to 90 km/h.

== Junction lists ==
The entire route is located in Kuantan District, Pahang.

Legend:

- I/C - Interchange, I/S - Intersection, RSA - Rest and service area, OBR - Overhead bridge restaurant, R/R - Restaurant and rest plaza, L/B - Layby, V/P - Vista point, TN - tunnel, T/P - Toll plaza, BR - Bridge
- C - Cloverleaf, S - Stack, T-A - Trumpet-A, T-B - Trumpet-B, DT - Directional-T/Y, SDT - Semi-Directional-T/Y, P-Y - Partial-Y, D - Diamond, P-C - Partial cloverleaf, D-D - Diverging diamond, D-R - Direct ramp

Location	km	mi	Destinations	Notes
Kuantan Port			FT 3 / AH18 Malaysia Federal Route 3 – Kuala Terengganu, Chukai, Jabur, Kuantan, Johor Bahru, Gambang, Gebeng Industrial Area East Coast Expressway / AH141 – Kuala Lumpur, Kuala Terengganu	Trunpet interchange
Kuantan Port			Jalan Pelabuhan 3/2 – Bukit Pengorak, Beserah, Kuantan	T-junctions
Kuantan Port			Jalan Pelabuhan 3/1	T-junctions
Kuantan Port			Jalan Pelabuhan 3/3	T-junctions
Kuantan Port			Jalan Pelabuhan 3/4 – Bukit Pengorak, Beserah, Kuantan, Docks	T-junctions
1.000 mi = 1.609 km; 1.000 km = 0.621 mi
