= Malaysia Federal Route 1393 =

Road in Malaysia

Federal Route 1393
- Jalan Utama Tenggaroh

Major junctions
- West end: FT 3 Jalan Jemaluang
- FT 3 AH18 Federal Route 3
- East end: Tanjung Leman

Location
- Country: Malaysia
- Primary destinations: Tenggaroh

Highway system
- Highways in Malaysia; Expressways; Federal; State

Jalan Utama Tenggaroh, Federal Route 1393, is a federal road in Johor, Malaysia.

At most sections, the Federal Route 1393 was built under the JKR R5 road standard, with a speed limit of 90 km/h.

== List of junctions ==
Km	Exit	Junctions	To	Remarks
		Jalan Jemaluang	North; FT 3 AH18 Jemaluang; FT 3 AH18 Mersing; FT 3 AH18 Kuantan; FT 50 Kluang; FT 50 Ayer Hitam; FT 50 Batu Pahat South; FT 3 AH18 Kota Tinggi; FT 3 AH18 Johor Bahru; FT 94 Kulai	T-junctions
		Checkpost		
		Sungai Simpang Kanan bridge		
		FELDA Tenggaroh --		
		FELDA Tenggaroh --		
		Sungai Ambat bridge		
		FELDA Tenggaroh --		
		FELDA Tenggaroh --		
		FELDA Tenggaroh --		
		FELDA Tenggaroh --		
		Kampung Tanjung Leman		
		Tanjung Leman	Tanjung Leman Ferry Terminal (Ferry to Sibu Island, and other surrounding areas); V	
