= Abu Bakar Bridge =

Sungai Pahang Bridge Jambatan Abu Bakar
- Coordinates: 3°30′22″N 103°23′31″E
- Carries: Motor vehicles, Pedestrians
- Crosses: Pahang River
- Locale: Federal Route 3 Jalan Kuantan-Pekan
- Official name: Abu Bakar Bridge
- Maintained by: Malaysian Public Works Department (JKR) Pekan

Characteristics
- Design: box girder bridge
- Total length: 600 m
- Width: --
- Longest span: --

History
- Designer: Malaysian Public Works Department (JKR)
- Constructed by: Malaysian Public Works Department (JKR)
- Opened: 1970

The Abu Bakar Bridge (Malay: Jambatan Abu Bakar) is the main bridge on Pahang River near Pekan, Pahang, Malaysia. It is located at Jalan Kuantan-Pekan (Federal Route 3). Construction started in 1968 and was completed two years later, with the total cost of RM2.5 million. The bridge was opened on 28 February 1970 by Almarhum Sultan Abu Bakar of Pahang.

Like most of the major bridges constructed in the 1960s and early 1970s, the Abu Bakar Bridge was once a toll bridge for a short period. The toll rate was RM1 for cars and RM2 for buses and lorries.

== See also ==
- Transport in Malaysia
