= Kemasik =

Town and mukim in Kemaman, Terengganu, Malaysia

Kemasik كماسيق
- Town in Kemaman
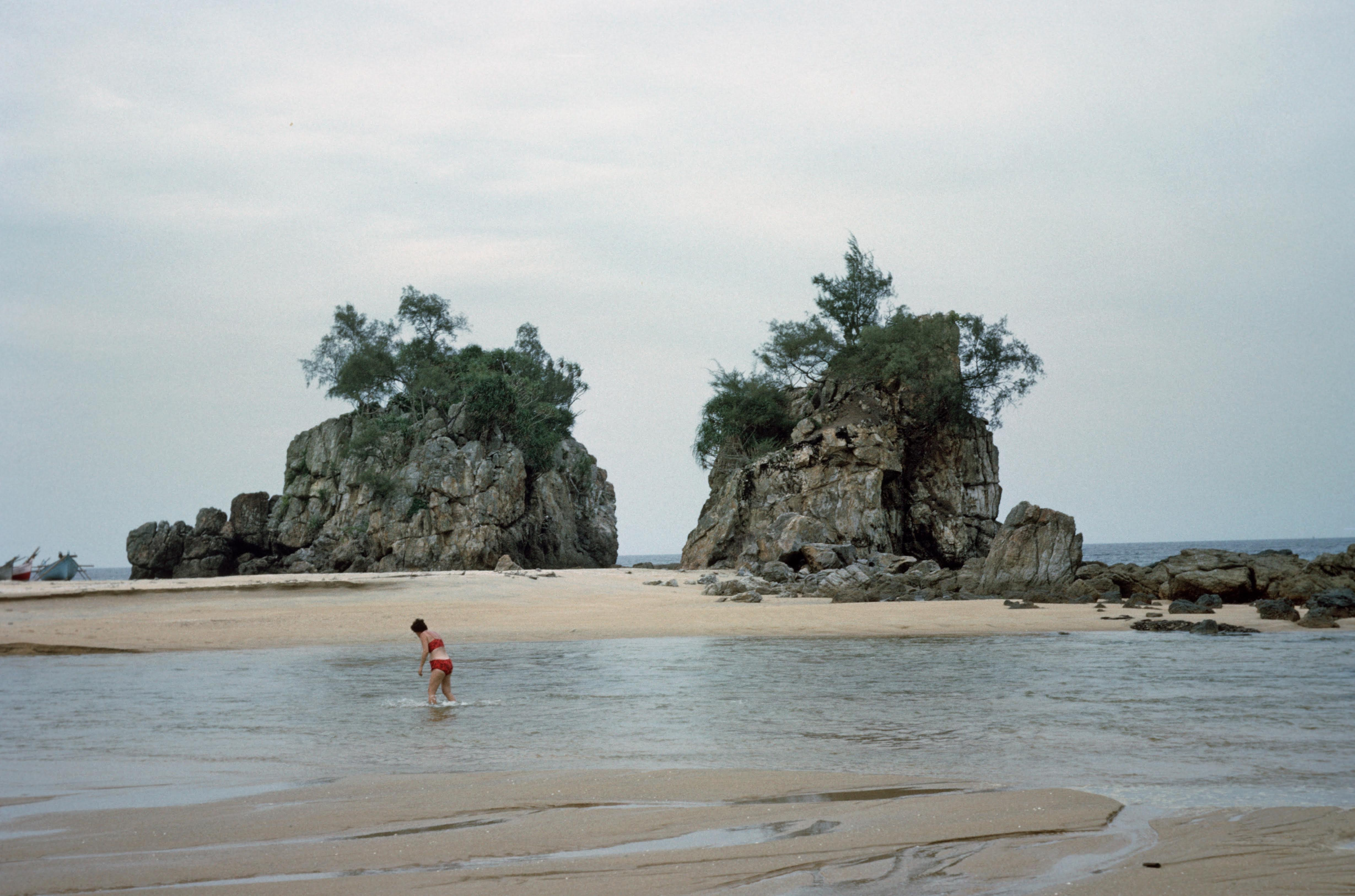
- Rock stacks at Kemasik Beach

- Kemasik in Kemaman

- Kemasik in Terengganu Kemasik (Peninsular Malaysia) Kemasik (Malaysia)
- Coordinates: 4°25′10″N 103°25′00″E
- Country: Malaysia
- State: Terengganu
- District: Kemaman

Area
  - Total: 65.64 km^{2} (25.34 sq mi)

Population (2020)
  - Total: 10,247
- postcode: 24200

Kemasik (Jawi: كماسيق) is a mukim in Kemaman District, Terengganu, Malaysia. The town's major attraction is Kemasik Beach (Pantai Kemasik in Malay).

== Transport ==
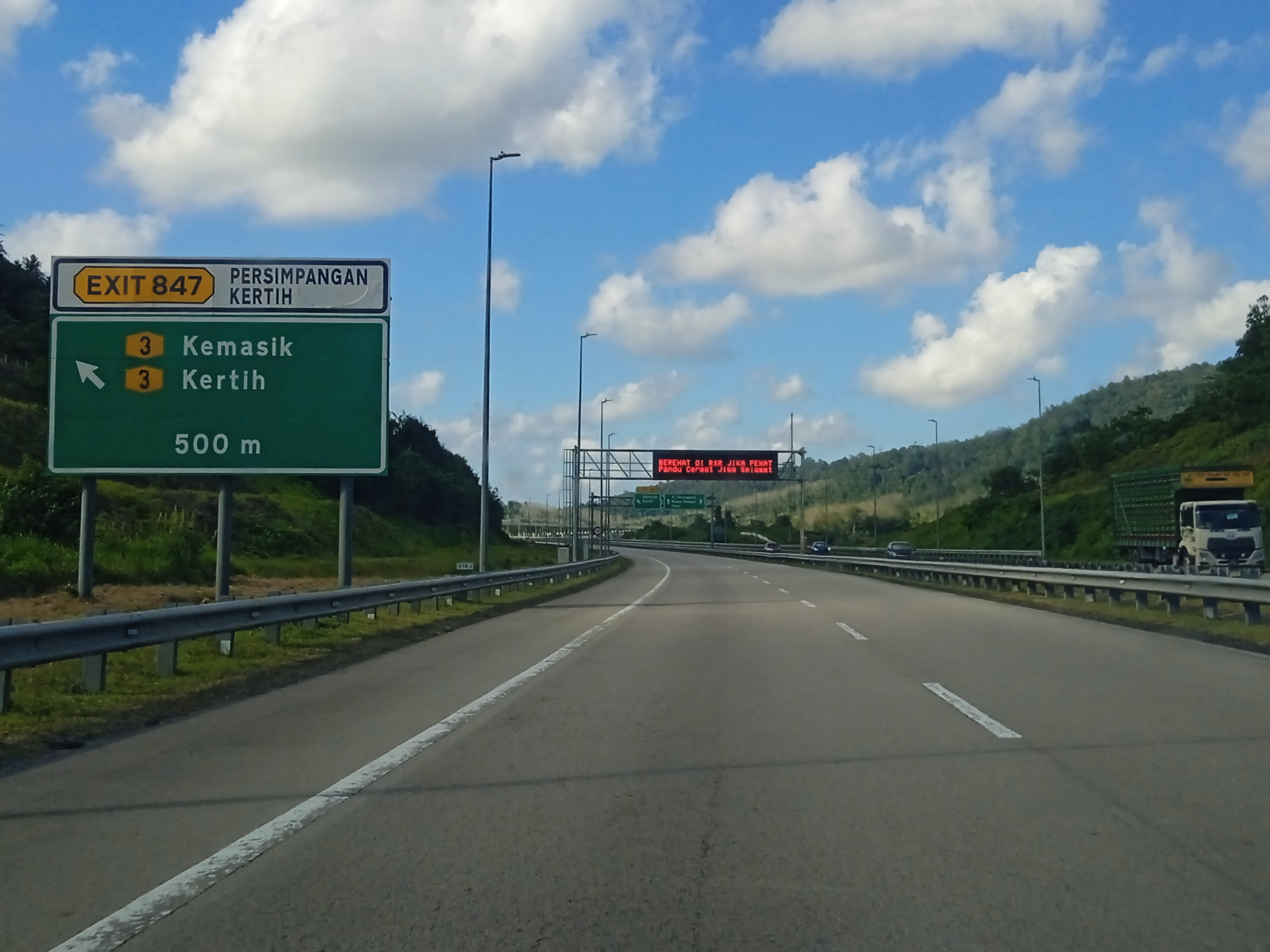
E8 towards Kertih Interchnge

East Coast Expressway (Lebuhraya Pantai Timur), exit 847 (Kertih Interchange) serves Kemasik.
