= Rantau Abang =

- Town in Malaysia
- Rantau Abang in Terengganu, Malay Peninsular and Malaysia Rantau Abang (Peninsular Malaysia) Rantau Abang (Malaysia)
- Coordinates: 4°52′15″N 103°23′22″E
- Country: Malaysia
- State: Terengganu
- District: Dungun
- Time zone: UTC+8 (MYT)
- Postal code: 23050

Rantau Abang (Jawi: رنتاو ابڠ) is a small village in Dungun District, Terengganu, Malaysia, which used to be known for its leatherback sea turtle nesting.

It is located 22 km north of Kuala Dungun and 80 km south of Kuala Terengganu, Terengganu, Malaysia.

At one time, every year during the months of May to August, the turtles would come ashore and lay their eggs. However, the number of sea turtles that lay their eggs has severely decreased in recent years. It has been estimated that during the 1950s over 10,000 of these turtles called the beaches on Rantau Abang their sanctuary. Recently the local government declared these turtles extinct as no turtle landings have been sighted for quite some time. The biggest reasons for the decline have been poachers who take the turtle eggs and sell them in local villages, as turtle eggs are a local delicacy, and disturbance from tourists. The Turtle and Marine Ecosystem Centre has been set up in Rantau Abang to spearhead conservation efforts.

The beach is safe for swimming, and is still used for other tourist activities.
