= Sultan Ismail Power Station =

Power station in Dungun, Terengganu, Malaysia

- Official name: Paka Power Station
- Country: Malaysia
- Location: Paka, Terengganu
- Coordinates: 4°35′50″N 103°26′55″E
- Status: Operational
- Commission date: 1988
- Decommission date: 31 December 2019
- Owner: Tenaga Nasional
- Operators: National Electricity Board (NEB) (Lembaga Letrik Negara (LLN)) (1988-1990); Tenaga Nasional Berhad (TNB) (1990-present)

Thermal power station
- Primary fuel: Gas
- Secondary fuel: Oil
- Combined cycle?: Yes

Power generation
- Nameplate capacity: 1,400 MW

The Sultan Ismail Power Station is the largest gas turbine power station in Malaysia in Paka, Dungun District, Terengganu. It is the first gas-fired power station in Malaysia. It generates 1,136 MW electricity.

The station is the first and still remains the largest plant of this combined cycle type in Tenaga Nasional. With a capacity of 1150 MW, it is the second largest power plant after Port Klang Power Station. The station uses natural gas as the main fuel. The gas is supplied by Petronas from its nearby gas processing plant, connected with the Peninsula Gas Utilisation.

== History ==
Plans for the construction of the power station – used to generate electricity for Kelantan, Terengganu and Pahang – was announced in 1979, with the construction began around late 1983.

The station was completed in 1987 and officially opened in 1988 by Almarhum Sultan Mahmud Al-Muktafi Billah Shah of Terengganu.

== Type of power station ==
The type of power station is an oil and gas turbine from Petronas oil and gas refinery in Kerteh.
