= Rantau Petronas =

Township in Kerteh, Terengganu, Malaysia

Rantau Petronas is a township in Kerteh, Terengganu, Malaysia.
