= Sungai Padi Road =

Road in Thailand

National Highway 4056
- ทางหลวงแผ่นดินหมายเลข 4056
- ถนนสุไหงปาดี Su-ngai Padi Road

Route information
- Length: 53.238 km (33.081 mi)

Major junctions
- North end: Hwy 4055 in Mueang Narathiwat, Narathiwat Province
- Hwy 4321 in Bang Po; Hwy 4322 in Chuap; Hwy 4322 in Cho-airong; Hwy 4322 in Maruebo Ok; Hwy 4323 in Todeng; Hwy 4193 / Hwy 4323 in Su-ngai Padi; Hwy 4057 in Su-ngai Kolok
- South end: Hwy 42 / AH18 in Su-ngai Kolok, Narathiwat Province

Location
- Country: Thailand
- Major cities: Narathiwat, Ra-ngae, Su-ngai Padi

Highway system
- Highways in Thailand; Motorways; Asian Highways

Su-ngai Padi Road (Thai: ถนนสุไหงปาดี, Thanon Su-ngai Padi) or Khao Kong – Su-ngai Kolok Or Narathiwat – Su-ngai Kolok. Highway 4056 (Thai: ทางหลวงแผ่นดินหมายเลข 4056) is a major highway in Narathiwat Province of Thailand.

== Junction and town lists ==
The entire route is located in Narathiwat province.

Legend:

- I/C - Interchange, I/S - Intersection, RSA - Rest and service area, OBR - Overhead bridge restaurant, R/R - Restaurant and rest plaza, L/B - Layby, V/P - Vista point, TN - tunnel, T/P - Toll plaza, BR - Bridge
- C - Cloverleaf, S - Stack, T-A - Trumpet-A, T-B - Trumpet-B, DT - Directional-T/Y, SDT - Semi-Directional-T/Y, P-Y - Partial-Y, D - Diamond, P-C - Partial cloverleaf, D-D - Diverging diamond, D-R - Direct ramp

District	Km	Exit	Name	Destinations	Notes
Mueang Narathiwat	0+000		Narathiwat	Hwy 4055 – Bang Nak, Yi-ngo, Bacho, Bangkok, Ra-ngae, Chanae, Sukhirin	T-junctions
Mueang Narathiwat	4+0XX		Bang Po	Hwy 4321 – Manang Tayo, Ra-ngae, Yi-ngo; Local Road	Junctions
Ra-ngae			Ra-ngae		
Cho-airong			Chuap	Hwy 4322 – Cho-airong, Maruebo Ok	Y-junctions
Cho-airong			Cho-airong	Hwy 4322 – Chuap, Ra-ngae, Maruebo Ok, Tak Bai	Junctions
Cho-airong			Maruebo Ok	Hwy 4322 – Cho-airong, Chuap	Y-junctions
Su-ngai Padi			Todeng	Hwy 4323 – Paluru, Su-ngai Padi	T-junctions
Su-ngai Padi			Su-ngai Padi train crossing		
Su-ngai Padi			Su-ngai Padi	Hwy 4323 – Paluru, Todeng, Cho-airong; Hwy 4193 – Waeng, Sukhirin, Lo Chut	Junctions
Su-ngai Kolok	53.238		Su-ngai Kolok	Hwy 42 / AH18 – Tak Bai, Mueang Narathiwat, Bangkok; Hwy 4057 – Waeng, Buketa, Sukhirin	Junctions
Through to Hwy 42 / AH18
