= Rasau Kerteh =

Town in Terengganu, Malaysia

Rasau Kerteh راساو
- Country: Malaysia
- State: Terengganu
- District: Dungun
- Time zone: UTC+8 (Malaysian Standard Time)
- Postcode: 21400

Rasau Kerteh (Jawi: راساو) is a small settlement town in Terengganu, Malaysia. This settlement town is located near Bandar Ketengah Jaya.

It was established in the 1980s and experienced flash floods in late 2023.

Rasau Kerteh is also home to a recreational forest.
