= Kerteh Airport =

Airport in Kemaman, Terengganu, Malaysia

Kerteh Airport Lapangan Terbang Kerteh
- IATA: KTE; ICAO: WMKE

Summary
- Airport type: Private
- Owner: Petronas
- Operator: Senai Airport Terminal Services Sdn Bhd
- Serves: Kemaman, Terengganu, Malaysia
- Location: Kerteh, Terengganu, Malaysia
- Time zone: MST (UTC+08:00)
- Elevation AMSL: 18 ft / 5 m
- Coordinates: 04°32′15″N 103°25′36″E

Map
- Location in Kemaman, Terengganu KTE /WMKE (Peninsular Malaysia) KTE /WMKE (Malaysia)

Runways
Direction	Length		Surface
Direction	m	ft	Surface
16/34	1,362	4,469	Asphalt
- Source: AIP Malaysia

Kerteh Airport (IATA: KTE, ICAO: WMKE) is an airport in Kerteh, Kemaman District, Terengganu in Malaysia.

The airport is owned by Petroleum Nasional Berhad or Petronas via its East Coast Regional Office (ECRO), and was built to serve the airlifting of its own and ExxonMobil's employees to and from their various oil platforms located 100–200 km offshore South China Sea. The airport is operated by Senai Airport Terminal Services Sdn Bhd which is the operator of Senai International Airport since 2019. The airport although small, has a single 1,362 m (4,469 ft) long runway which can accommodate a Boeing 737-400 aircraft.

Most of the airport's operations are centred on the helicopters operated by Malaysia Helicopter Services (MHS) used to transport workers to the platforms. The airport also used to have a weekday fixed-wing chartered service using a Beechcraft 1900 Airliner turboprop aircraft, also operated by MHS, which shuttles Petronas and ExxonMobil employees from Kerteh to the Sultan Abdul Aziz Shah Airport (SZB) in Subang near Kuala Lumpur.

In 1990, the Terengganu state government discussed with Petronas on expanding the airport to cater to bigger aircraft.
