= Kijal =

- Town
- Kijal Beach

- Peninsular Malaysia
- Coordinates: 4°20′10″N 103°28′55″E
- City: Malaysia
- State: Terengganu
- District: Kemaman

Government
  - Type: Council Government

Area
  - Total: 100 km^{2} (39 sq mi)

Population (2017)
  - Total: 6,482
- Postal code: 24xxx

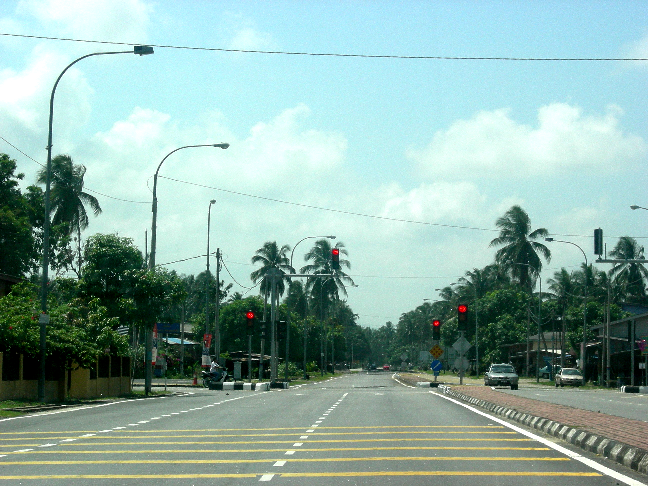
A street junction in Kijal

Kijal in Kemaman District

Kijal (Jawi: كيجل, est. pop. (2000 census): 4,375) is a mukim in Kemaman District, Terengganu, Malaysia. The town is well known for the Awana Kijal Golf and Beach Resort, a luxury resort which is owned by the Genting Group. Kijal is also known for its lemang and durian. The Kijal Beach stretches for 8 kilometers with rocky outcrops in the north at "Awana Kijal" and south at "Bukit Penunjuk". The famous "sleeping giant" rock formation in the sea is located at Penunjuk beach, where a tidal estuary is often used for anchoring of traditional fishing boats. Also known as Mirul Kijal's Hometown.

== Transport ==
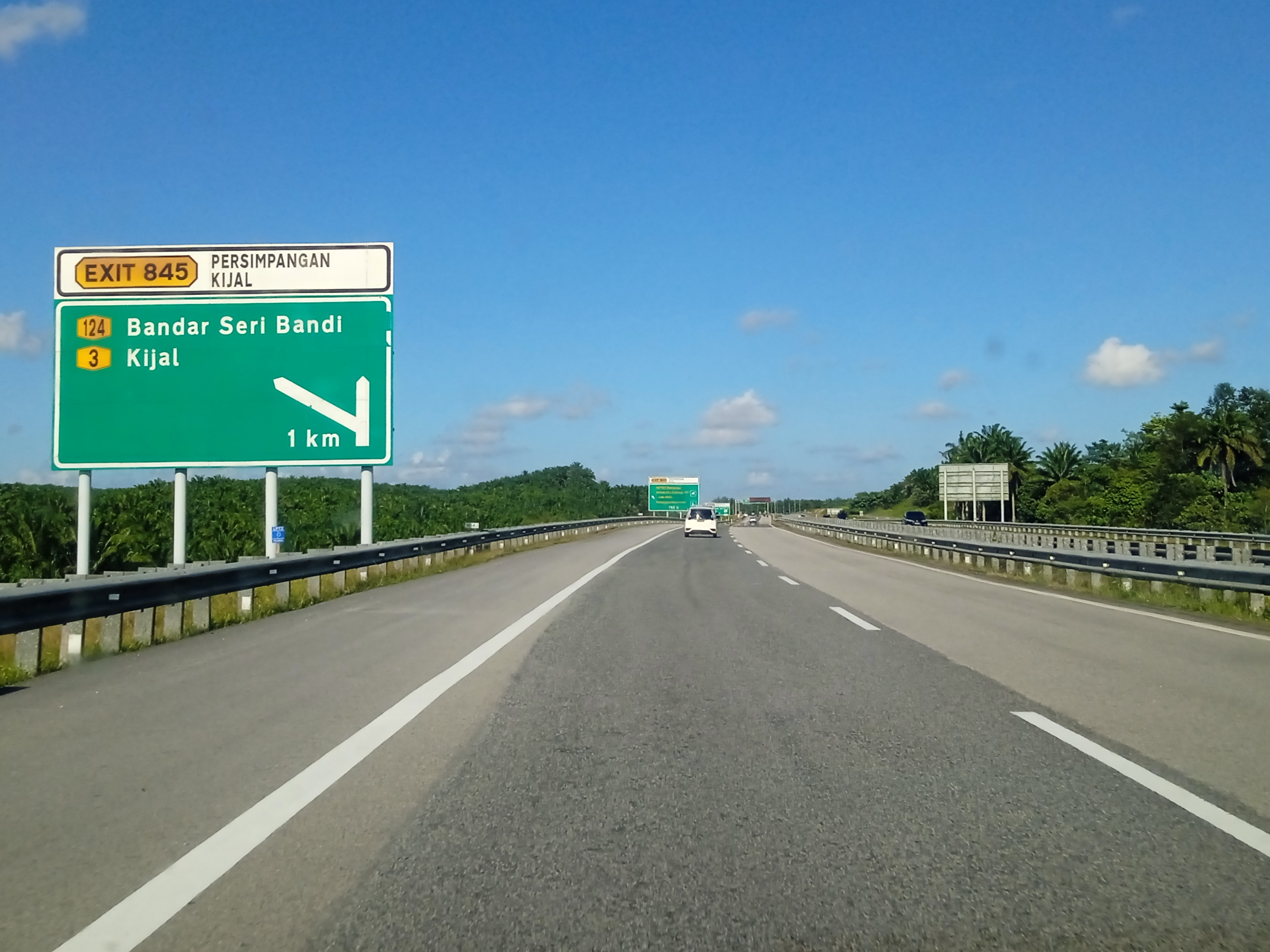
E8 towards Kijal Interchange

East Coast Expressway (Lebuhraya Pantai Timur), exit 845 (Kijal Interchange) serves Kijal.
