= Teluk Kalong =

Mukim in Kemaman, Terengganu, Malaysia

Coordinates: 4.2901739°N 103.465695°E

Teluk Kalong in Kemaman District

Teluk Kalung (Jawi: تلوق كالوڠ) is mukim in Kemaman District, Terengganu, Malaysia. The Perwaja Steel mill is located here, as is a plant of the Huntsman (Chemical) Corporation which produced titanium dioxide.

The connecting point of Phases 1 and 2 of the Peninsula Gas Utilisation pipeline is located here.
