= Paka, Malaysia =

Town in Dungun, Terengganu, Malaysia

Coordinates: 4°39′0″N 103°25′48″E

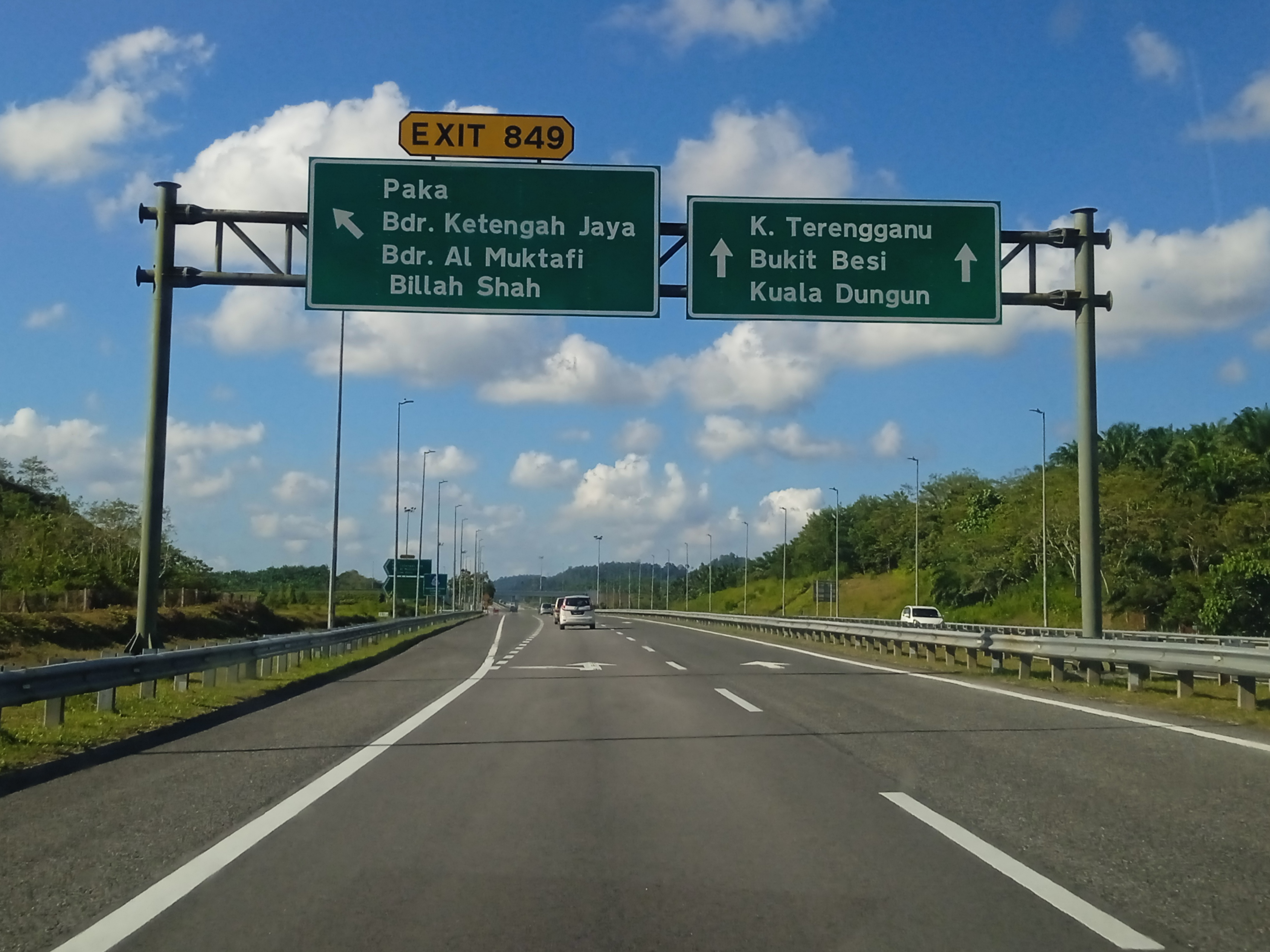
Paka

Paka (Jawi: ڤاك, est. pop. (2000 census): 10,599) is a coastal town facing the South China Sea in Dungun District, Terengganu, Malaysia.

Paka is now a busy town thriving on oil and gas activity near Kerteh, assisted by facilities at the petroleum-based industrial complex, completed in 1982.

Paka is more popularly known as the home for the largest power station in Malaysia run by the national power company, Tenaga Nasional. Many foreigners and expatriates serving the energy sector live here. Paka is about 100 km to the south of Kuala Terengganu, the capital city of Terengganu. Currently in the end of year 2013, Paka is listed as the third place in Malaysia with the highest living cost. The World Wide Fund for Nature operates a WWF Turtle Sanctuary nearby Paka.
