= Kerteh =

Town and mukim in Kemaman District, Terengganu, Malaysia

Kerteh كرتيه
- Mukim and town
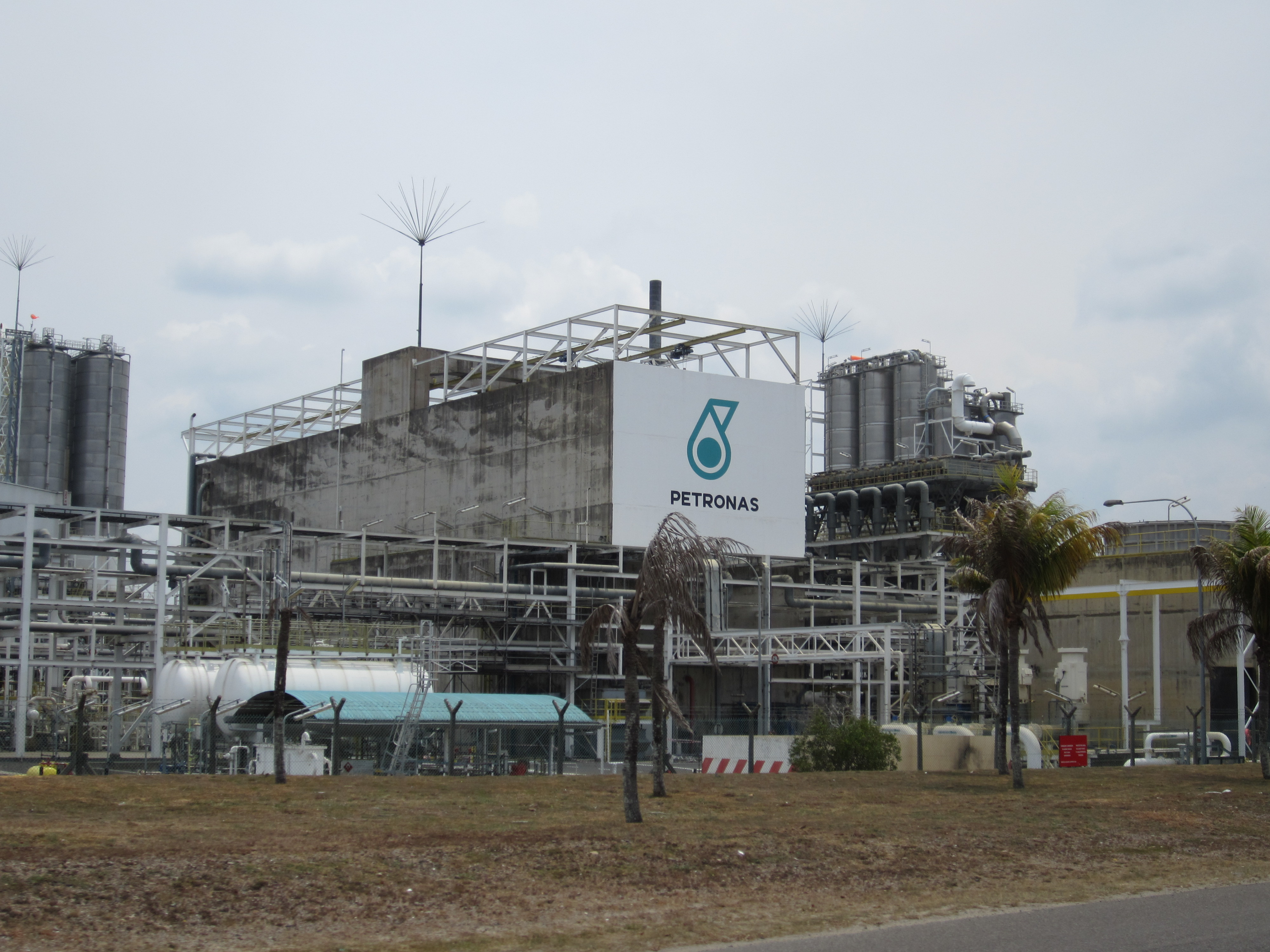
- Petronas crude oil refinery and petrochemical complex in Kerteh

- Location of Kerteh in Kemaman District

- Kerteh in Terengganu, Peninsular Malaysia Kerteh (Peninsular Malaysia) Kerteh (Malaysia)
- Coordinates: 4°31′30″N 103°22′20″E
- Country: Malaysia
- State: Terengganu
- District: Kemaman District

Area
  - Total: 252.9 km^{2} (97.6 sq mi)

Population (2020)
  - Total: 26,392
- Time zone: UTC+8 (MST)
- Postal code: 24300
- Area code: +60-9
- Vehicle registration plate: T

Kerteh (also spelt Kertih; Jawi: كرتيه) is a coastal town and mukim in Kemaman District, Terengganu, Malaysia. Positioned along the eastern coastline facing the South China Sea, Kerteh was transformed from a traditional fishing village into the operational headquarters of Malaysia's national petroleum company, Petronas, following the discovery of offshore oil fields in the late 20th century. At night, the expansive illumination from the petrochemical refineries and processing facilities gives Kerteh its popular moniker, the "City of Light".

== History and etymology ==
According to local oral traditions, the area surrounding Kerteh was historically low-lying swamp and wetlands. As the swampland dried out, locals referred to the land in the Terengganu Malay dialect as kering kerotey ("completely dried out"), which gradually contracted into Kerotey, Kretay, and eventually Kerteh. Another folk origin tale attributes the name to an encounter where early settlers spotted a monkey (kera) while clearing arable land, exclaiming "Kera Teh" to an elder named Mak Teh.

In the early 20th century, Kerteh served as a small coastal trade and agricultural settlement, known for producing dried fish, shrimp paste (belacan), and fermented fish sauce (budu). The site where the petrochemical refinery currently stands was once one of the largest coconut plantations in Terengganu, extending from Kampung Labohan northwards to Paka. Copra harvested from the estate was exported overseas through the natural coastal harbour at Kampung Labohan.

In 1979, surveyors and engineers from Petronas commenced land assessment for refinery plants, offshore pipelines, an airstrip, and employee housing schemes. The discovery of offshore crude oil and natural gas sparked rapid urbanization and industrialization throughout the 1980s, permanently altering the demographic and economic landscape of the district.

== Economy ==
Kerteh is the industrial bedrock of Terengganu's petrochemical economy. Petronas manages extensive operations in Kerteh, overseeing offshore extraction platforms, crude oil processing, and regional gas transport. The Terengganu Crude Oil Terminal (TCOT) and the initial oil refinery commenced commercial operations in 1983, while the Gas Processing Plant (GPP) was commissioned in August 1984 to feed the nationwide Peninsular Gas Utilisation (PGU) pipeline network.

Downstream industrial expansions include the Kerteh Terengganu Industrial Park (KTIP), a RM 680 million project developed across 407 hectares through a public-private consortium aimed at establishing an integrated bio-economy and second-generation biopolymer production hub. In urban development, the RM 500 million Garden Bay City project covers 44 acres along the Kerteh River and coastline, incorporating residential developments, commercial precincts, eco-tourism amenities, and a planned 200-bed private specialist hospital.

Retail services in the town are anchored by Mesra Mall, a major shopping complex catering to the eastern coastal petrochemical belt that houses supermarkets, international apparel brands, a multi-screen cinema, and family entertainment facilities.

== Tourism and conservation ==
- Ma'Daerah Turtle Sanctuary: Located along the northern coastal stretch of Kerteh near Kampung Labohan, this beach sanctuary was established in 1999 as a joint conservation effort between the Department of Fisheries, BP, and WWF-Malaysia. Operating primarily during the annual sea turtle nesting season between March and September, it protects nesting habitats for green sea turtles (penyu agar), hawksbill sea turtles, and leatherback turtles, featuring artificial incubation hatcheries and educational programmes for guided public releases of sea turtle hatchlings.
- Beaches and Coastal Recreation: Coastal beaches include Pantai Teluk Air Tawar, Pantai Seberang Penarik, and Pantai Paloh. Farther south near Kemasik, Pantai Kemasik features natural coastal twin rocks and an inland lagoon popular for photography.

== Transportation ==
Kerteh is served by Kerteh Airport (IATA: KTE, ICAO: WMKE), owned and operated by Senai Airport Terminal Services Sdn Bhd. The facility handles charter flights operated for oil and gas personnel to Sultan Abdul Aziz Shah Airport near Kuala Lumpur, as well as offshore helicopter services shuttling workers to oil and gas platforms in the South China Sea.

Road accessibility is provided by the East Coast Expressway (ECE, phase 2), connected directly via Exit 847 (Kertih Interchange). Federal Route 3 serves as the main trunk road traversing north–south through Kerteh town center.
