= Johor River =

River of Johor, Malaysia

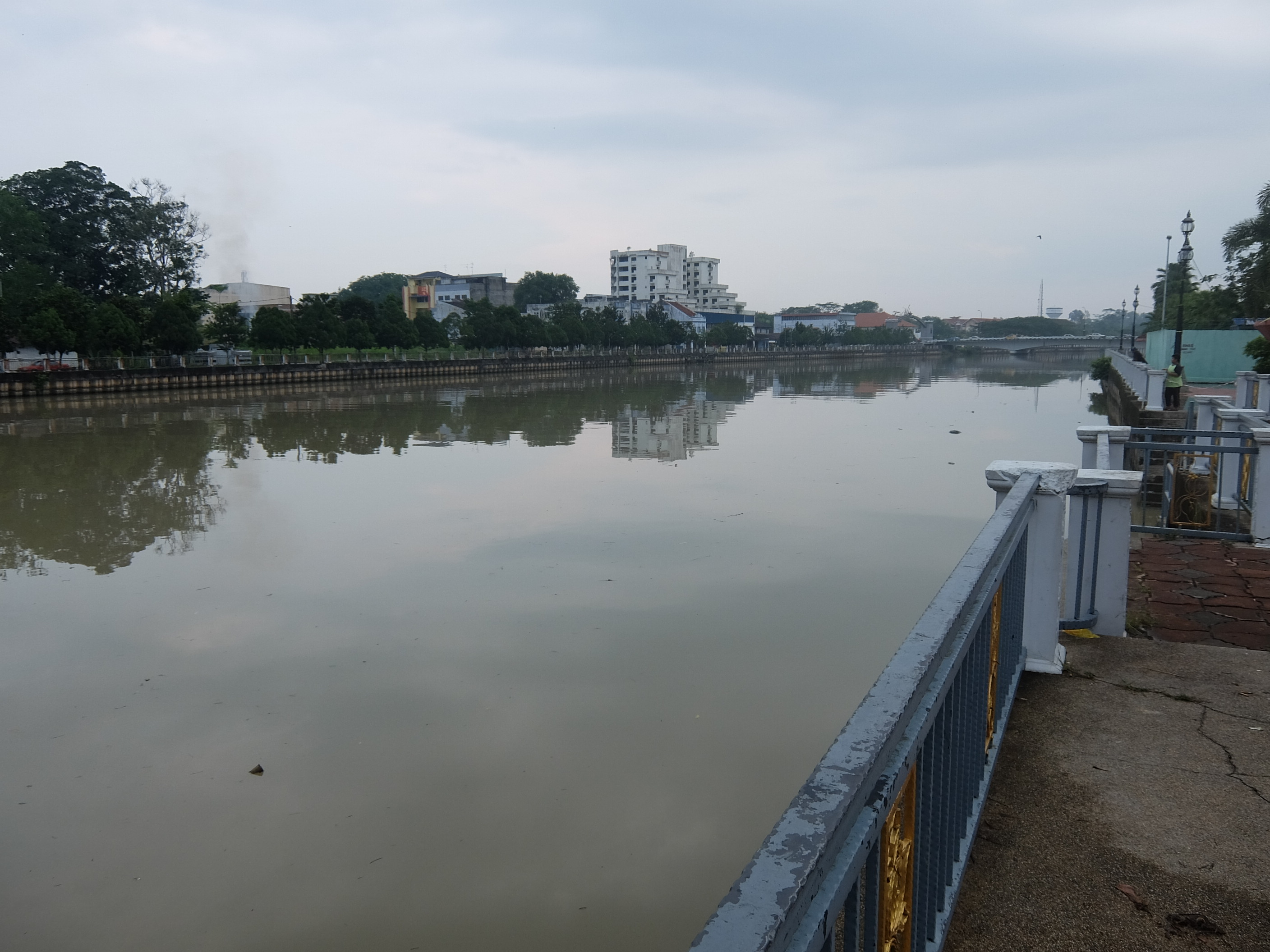
- Johor River section in Kota Tinggi
- Native name: Sungai Johor (Malay)

Location
- Country: Malaysia

Physical characteristics
- Source
  - location: Mt Gemuruh
  - coordinates: 1°49′00″N 103°42′00″E
  - elevation: 109 m (358 ft)
- Mouth
  - location: Strait of Johor
  - coordinates: 1°27′00″N 104°01′00″E
  - elevation: 0 m (0 ft)
- Length: 122.7 km (76.2 mi)
- Basin size: 2,636 km^{2} (1,018 sq mi)
- Discharge
  - average: 37.5 m^{3}/s (1,320 cu ft/s)

Basin features
- River system: Johor River
- Tributaries
  - left: Linggiu River; Lebam River
  - right: Sayong River; Semengar River; Tiram River

The Johor River (Malay: Sungai Johor) is the main river in the Malaysian state of Johor. The 122.7 km long river has a drainage basin of 2,636 km^{2} and flows in a roughly north–south direction, originating from Mount Gemuruh and then empties into the Strait of Johor. Its major tributaries are the Sayong, Linggiu, Tiram and Lebam Rivers. Its banks are also known to be the location of past capitals of Johor, the Johor Lama. The Sungai Johor Bridge, officially opened in June 2011, is the first bridge to span the river and is currently the longest river bridge in Malaysia.

== Water resources ==
The Johor River basin occupies about 14% of the Johor State of Peninsular Malaysia. The river and tributaries are important sources of water supply not only for the state itself but also for neighbouring Singapore. Syarikat Air Johor, SAJ (or Johor Water Company) and the Public Utilities Board of Singapore (PUB) each draws about 250,000 cubic metres/day of water from the Johor River near Kota Tinggi. Both water supply schemes have been operational since the mid-1960s. In addition, the Linggui Dam completed and impounded in 1993 also supplements the water supply to both Johor and Singapore.

== Wildlife ==
Evidence of the presence of a viable breeding population of dugongs in the waters of the Johor River estuary was collected between 1974 and 1989.

== Bridges ==
- Kota Tinggi Second Bridge
- Sungai Johor Bridge

== See also ==
- Geography of Malaysia
- List of rivers of Malaysia
