= Bandar Ketengah Jaya =

Townships in Malaysia

Coordinates: 4°34′13.8″N 103°19′04.8″E

Ketengah Jaya (Jawi: كتڠه جاي) is a township in Dungun District, Terengganu, Malaysia. It is located within the Paka area. The villagers main source of income is their sustenance of oil palm plantations in this area. This township is partitioned into villages such as Felda Kerteh 1 to 6.
