= Kemaman District =

Kemaman District Kemamang (Terengganu Malay)
- District of Terengganu
- Daerah Kemaman
- Flag Seal

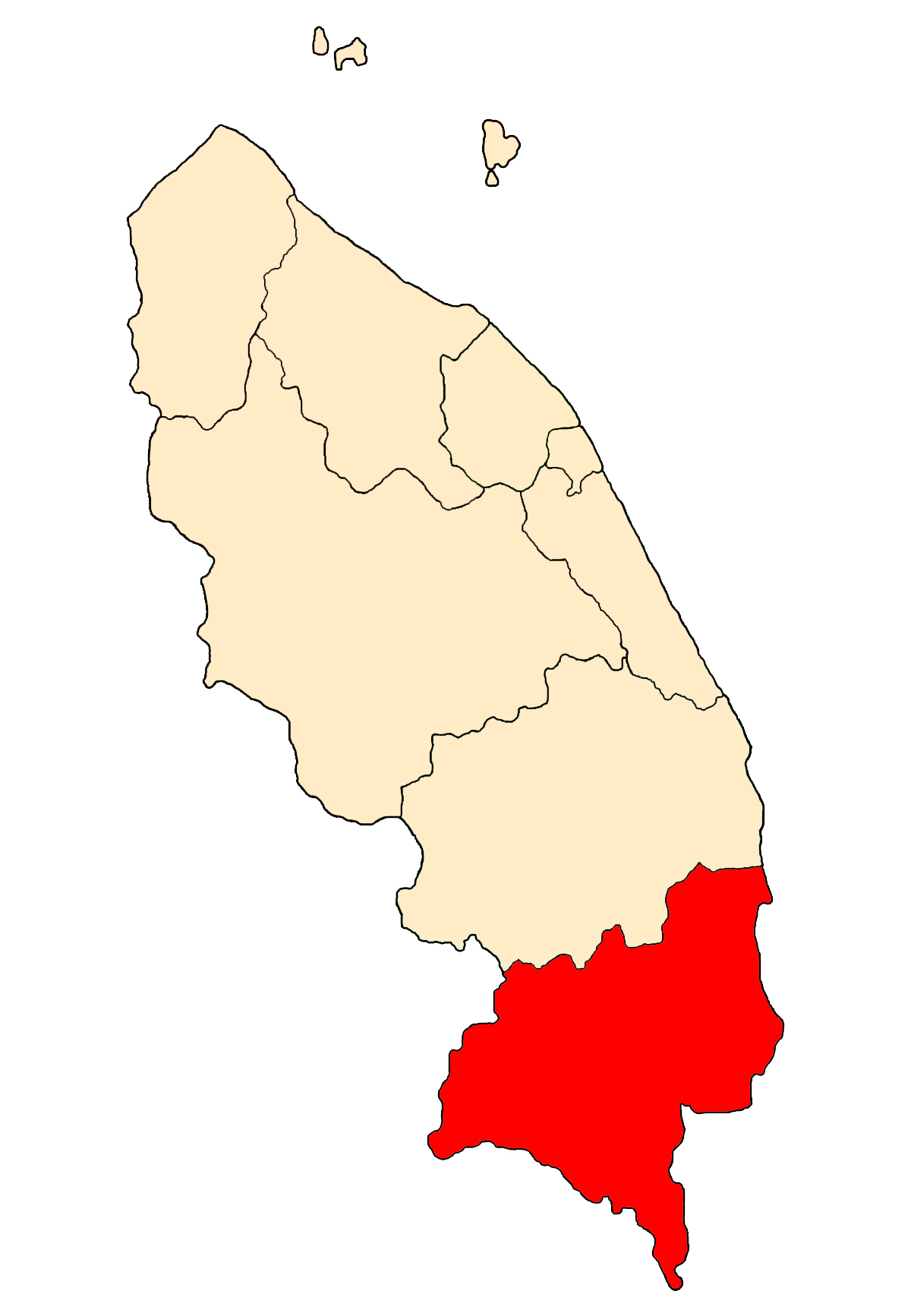
- Location of Kemaman District in Terengganu
- Interactive map of Kemaman District
- Location of Kemaman District in Malaysia
- Coordinates: 4°15′N 103°10′E
- Country: Malaysia
- State: Terengganu
- Seat: Chukai
- Local area government: Municipal Council

Government
  - President: Fadli Yusof Bin Zakaria

Area
  - Total: 2,535.60 km^{2} (979.00 sq mi)

Population (2010)
  - Total: 166,434
  - Estimate (2020): 215,000
  - Density: 65.6389/km^{2} (170.004/sq mi)
- Time zone: UTC+8 (MST)
  - Summer (DST): UTC+8 (Not observed)
- Postcode: 24xxx
- Calling code: +6-09-8
- Vehicle registration plates: T

Kemaman (Terengganu Malay: Kemamang or Mamang) is a district in Terengganu, Malaysia. Kemaman District is bordered by Dungun District to the north and the state of Pahang to the south and west. It is the southern gateway to the state of Terengganu.

The district administrative seat and the main economic centre of Kemaman is the town of Chukai, near the Terengganu-Pahang state border. Other important towns in this district are Kijal, Kerteh, and Kemasik. The district is administered by the Municipal Council. With a total area of almost 1000 square miles, it is the third largest district after Hulu Terengganu and Dungun bordering the South China Sea.

== Administrative divisions ==

Kemaman District is divided into 12 mukims, which are:

- Bandi
- Banggul
- Binjai
- Chukai (Capital)
- Hulu Chukai
- Hulu Jabur
- Kemasik
- Kerteh
- Kijal
- Pasir Semut
- Tebak
- Teluk Kalong

== Demography ==
Historical population
Year	Pop.	±%
1991	111,901	—
2000	137,070	+22.5%
2010	166,750	+21.7%
2020	215,582	+29.3%

Based on the 2020 Population and Housing Census, the population of Kemaman in 2020 totals 215,582 is 17% of the Terengganu population. Based on the 2017 data, Malays were the majority ethnic group with a total of 197,941, while 7,840 were Chinese, 749 were Indian, 1,378 were Bumiputeras (non Malay) and 323 were from other ethnic groups. Another 7,351 people were non citizens. Censuses until the 1940s showed that this district as the third highest populated area after Kuala Terengganu and Besut. The population distribution changed after the discovery of oil in the 1970s, placing this district second after Kuala Terengganu.

== Geography ==
The geographical features of this district can be divided into three main areas which include coastal area, inland area and the foothill area (located only a few kilometres from the beach). The coastal area is a flat lowland with the majority of the people focus on fishing activities. This area stretches about 38 kilometres from Kuala Kemaman to Kerteh. More than half of Kemaman's population is concentrated in this area. The inland area of the district is a region of highlands with hilly features. This area is rich with tin ore, oil palm plantation and timber. So, the concentration of population here is related to local economic activities. The foothill area is the second highest populated area. The area is located between the coastal and the inland areas. The main occupation of the residents in this area is farming.

== History ==
According to early history, Kemaman was started to be known since the second century BC by the name of Kole. This is based on the map of the Golden Chersonese which has been drawn by Ptolemy (a Greek astronomer and geographer, born in Egypt in the second century BC) noting that there were two ports in the East Coast, Perimula and Kole. Historians agreed that Perimula was the Terengganu River estuary (present-day Kuala Terengganu) and Kole was Kemaman.

In spite of that, the history of the opening of this district is still vague as there is no written account and valid evidence about it. Anyway, local historian agreed that the district has begun to be explored about 300 years ago by Che Wan Teh and his followers. Che Wan Teh was from a noble Pahang family who migrated to this district from Kuala Pahang following a disorder and chaos situation in Kuala Pahang. He then set up a settlement in the coastal area and the first village found was Bukit Mengkuang Before the Malays came, the district (this particular area) was occupied by the Sakais who then moved to the inland area.

After sometimes in Bukit Mengkuang, Che Wan Teh moved to a new settlement area adjacent to Kemaman River estuary known as Tanjung Geliga. This new settlement was also unsecured as it was often disturbed by pirates and robbers threat. As a result, Che Wan Teh and his followers moved to another new area on the bank of Kemaman River (about 3 kilometers from Tanjung Geliga). This place was later known as Chukai. This event is strongly proved by existence of an old cemetery in the area. It was said that Che Wan Teh died shortly after opening Kampung Chukai. His followers and generations after him continuously explored new areas following the rise in population and the need for new agricultural areas.

Other than verbal explanation, there was another version which referred to some written accounts relating the opening of Kemaman District with a Pattani aristocrat known as Lebai Saras. Anyway, this version recorded the 19th century early event when Terengganu was under the rule of Sultan Ahmad Shah 1 (1808 – 1830) and indirectly coincides with the opening of Kemaman District by Che Wan Teh.

== Economy ==
Kemaman's economy is primarily based on the petroleum, oil, and steel industries. Petronas' discovery of oil in offshore Terengganu in the 1980s has attracted immigration to Kemaman from rural areas as well as other parts of the country. Terengganu Petroleum Refineries in Kerteh are the first refineries owned by Petronas. Kemaman Port also has a liquified petroleum gas (LPG) export terminal managed by Petronas, the national oil corporation. The presence of petroleum and oil industry here also causing this district well developed as well. Traditional industries include fishing, anchovies and salted fish manufacturing which was pioneered by the Chinese. One well known local fishing merchant was Soh Huat Keh who was among the successful pioneers of the salted fish manufacturing industry there. These seafood produces are exported throughout Malaysia and Singapore.

The presence of natural gas has also been the spur for the development of the iron and steel industry in Kemaman. A large steel making company, Perwaja, established direct-reduced iron/electric arc furnace (DRI/EAF) facilities, with its own import/export facilities on the East Wharf.

== Tourism ==
Among the beaches that can be found in this district are Kemasik Beach, Teluk Mak Nik, Telaga Simpul Beach, Cagar Hutan Beach, and Ma'Daerah Beach. Kemaman's beaches used to be nesting grounds for endangered green turtle and painted terrapins. However, due to local desire for turtle eggs, these sea creatures were declared extinct in the area since year 2004. Among serious efforts to get turtles back to nest on the nearby beaches is the setting up of a turtle sanctuary in Ma'Daerah Beach, called Ma'Daerah Turtle Sanctuary, which provides an undisturbed beach for nesting turtles and protection for eggs. This turtle conservation centre is operated under the joint auspices of Department of Fisheries, BP and WWF Malaysia.

The first zoo in east coast region of Peninsular Malaysia, Bukit Takal Recreational Park and Mini Zoo, is also located in Kemaman. It was opened on 11 April 2009. Occupying a 54 ha site in Kampung Ibok about 14 km from Chukai, it is a combination of fruit orchard, water theme park, herbal park, orchid park, playground and zoo. Among the main attractions of this zoo is riding the train around the zoo, walking on the hanging bridge, riding on the elephants, watching different bird species, and experiencing the natural lights of the largest firefly habitat in Terengganu.

Kemaman is famous for food-based tourism. Keropok lekor can be easily found along the road to Kuala Kemaman. All kinds of local delicacies, such as satar, nekbat, lemang and otak-otak, are sold here and are different from those found in Kuala Terengganu and unique to Kemaman. These traditional foods are also commercially made and packaged in Kijal, Kemasik, and Chukai. Kuih is available at Kemaman Street Market at Jalan Sulaimani and Evening Market at Jalan Air Putih near the Chukai interchange from the East Coast Expressway. Along the roads leading to Kemasek, you can find a variety of stalls selling Kemaman-style lemang.

Kemaman is also popular for the famous Hainanese kopi tiam, Hai Peng Coffee Shop, at the Jalan Sulaimani crossroad. The shop is the original location of the business franchise Kemaman Kopitiam that can be found throughout the country. Halal food has been served in the premises for many years as the Chinese owners have blended well with the Malay community for such a long time.

== Federal Parliament and State Assembly seats ==
List of Kemaman district representatives in the Federal Parliament (Dewan Rakyat)

Parliament	Seat name	Member of Parliament	Party
P40	Kemaman	Ahmad Samsuri Mokhtar	PN (PAS)

List of Kemaman district representatives in the State Legislative Assembly of Terengganu

Parliament	State	Seat name	State Assemblyman	Party
P40	N29	Kemasik	Saiful Azmi Suhaili	PN (PAS)
P40	N30	Kijal	Razali Idris	PN (BERSATU)
P40	N31	Cukai	Hanafiah Mat	PN (PAS)
P40	N32	Air Putih	Mohd Hafiz Adam	PN (PAS)

== Shopping ==
Popular shopping locations in Kemaman include the central area in Jalan Sulaimani and Jalan Da' Omar with the landmark being Kemaman Centre Point. In addition, branded and designer shops can be found at the Mesra Mall, located in Kemasik. Mesra Mall also hosts Terengganu's first cinema with a TGV Cinemas outlet which opened in 2010.

== Notable people from Kemaman ==
- Maria Hertogh, grew up in Kampung Banggol, Chukai.
- Rafizi Ramli, Politician, grew up in Kemaman

== See also ==
- Districts of Malaysia
