= AH18 =

Road in Asia

Asian Highway 18

Major junctions
- North end: Hat Yai, Songkhla, Thailand
- South end: Johor Bahru, Johor, Malaysia

Location
- Countries: Thailand; Malaysia

Highway system
- Asian Highway Network
← AH17	→ AH19

Asian Highway 18 is a highway route included in Asian Highway Network, running from Hat Yai in Thailand to Johor Bahru, Malaysia. Route AH18 runs along main eastern coastal road in southern Thailand and also along Federal Route 3 of Malaysia.

== Thailand ==
Asian Highway 18 connects these cities in Thailand: Hat Yai - Pattani - Narathiwat - Tak Bai - Su-ngai Kolok

- Hwy 43 : Hat Yai - Nong Chik
- Hwy 42 : Nong Chik - Su-ngai Kolok

== Malaysia ==
Asian Highway 18 connects these cities in Malaysia: Rantau Panjang - Pasir Mas - Kota Bharu - Pasir Puteh - Kuala Terengganu - Marang - Kuala Dungun - Paka - Chukai - Balok - Kuantan - Pekan - Mersing - Kota Tinggi - Johor Bahru

- FT 3 : Rantau Panjang - Johor Bahru

== Junctions ==
AH2 Hat Yai

AH2 Johor Bahru
