= Malaysia Federal Route 14 =

Road in Malaysia

Federal Route 14
- Jerangau–Jabor Highway

Route information
- Maintained by Malaysian Public Works Department
- Length: 179.63 km (111.62 mi)
- Existed: 1977–present
- History: Completed in 1979

Major junctions
- North end: Kuala Terengganu, Terengganu
- FT 3 / AH18 Federal Route 3 FT 250 Bukit Payung–Telemung Highway; FT 106 Federal Route 106; FT 249 Jalan FELDA Mengkawang-Bukit Diman; FT 132 Bukit Besi Highway; FT 128 Federal Route 128; FT 122 Ketengah Highway; FT 124 Federal Route 124; FT 237 Jalan Air Putih; FT 126 Federal Route 126; East Coast Expressway; FT 3486 Jalan Semambu FT 101 / AH141 Gebeng Bypass FT 3 / AH18 Kuantan Bypass
- South end: Kuantan Bypass, Kuantan, Pahang

Location
- Country: Malaysia
- Primary destinations: Kuala Berang, Ajil, Jerangau, Bukit Besi, Bandar Al-Muktafi Billah Shah, Bandar Chenih Bahru

Highway system
- Highways in Malaysia; Expressways; Federal; State

Jerangau–Jabor Highway, Federal Route 14 (Malay: Lebuhraya Jerangau–Jabor) is a 179.63 km (111.62 mi) federal highway in Malaysia running from the city of Kuala Terengganu, Terengganu to Kuantan, Pahang. The highway runs in parallel with the Federal Route 3 - while the FT3 highway is a coastal highway, the Jerangau–Jabor Highway FT14 runs through the interior area instead. Although the distance from Kuala Terengganu to Kuantan via both FT3 and FT14 highways are about the same (about 200 km), the Jerangau–Jabor Highway FT14 significantly shortens the travelling time due to fewer towns being passed. Therefore, the Jerangau–Jabor Highway FT14 became the main route from Pahang to Terengganu before the advent of the East Coast Expressway Phase 2 E8.

== Route background and features ==
The Jerangau–Jabor Highway FT14 is the interior counterpart of the Terengganuan section of the Federal Route 3, with its Kilometre Zero located at its interchange with the Kuantan Bypass FT3. The distance between Kuantan and Kuala Terengganu via the FT14 and FT3 highways are almost the same (200 km), but the journey via the FT14 highway is faster due to fewer towns along the way. There are three major rest areas (RSA) along the Jerangau–Jabor Highway FT14, namely the Bandar Cheneh Baharu RSA, Bandar Al-Muktafi Billah Shah R//R and Bukit Besi RSA.

== History ==
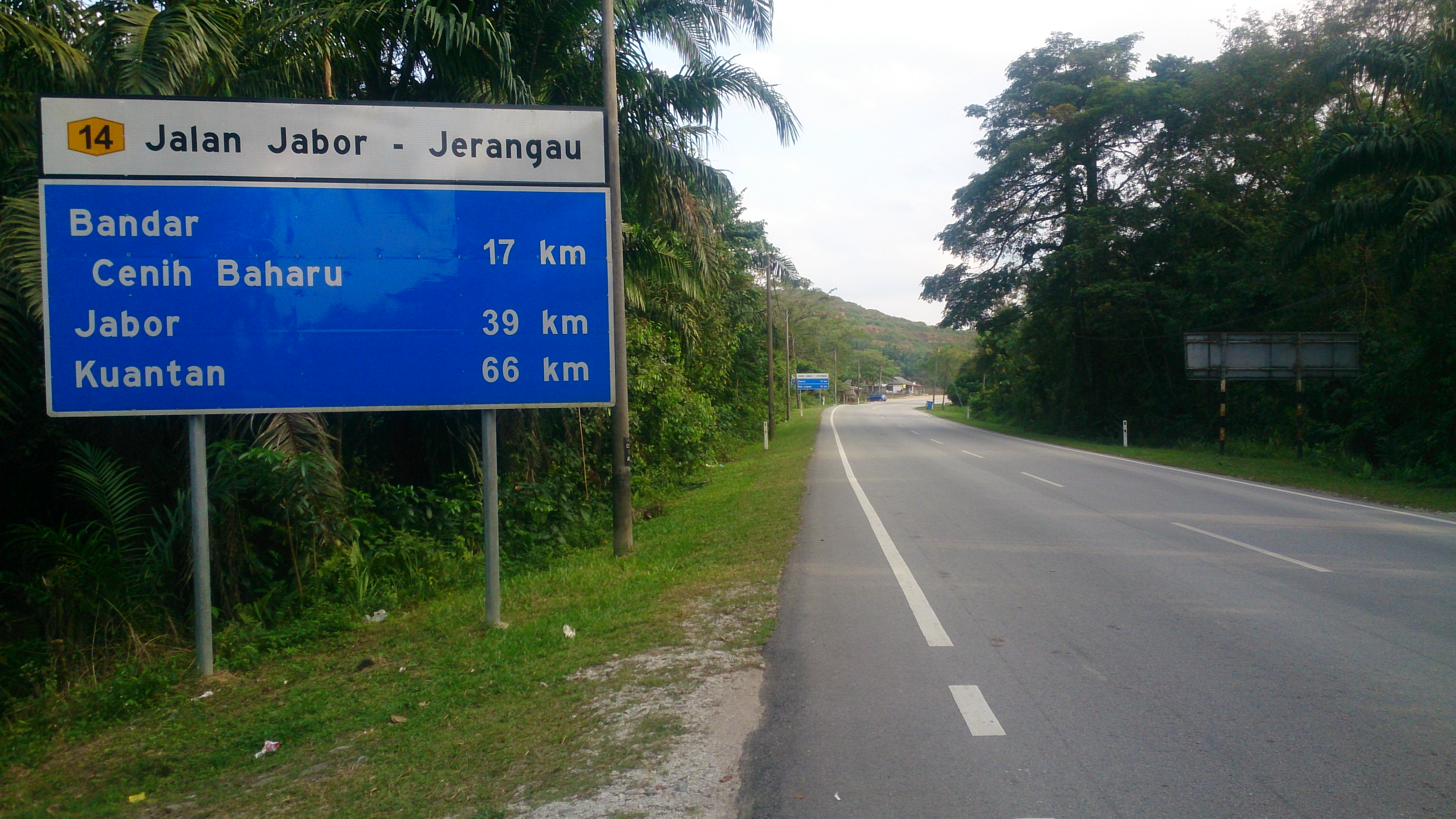
The Jerangau-Jabor Highway FT14 near Air Putih, Terengganu.

The Jerangau–Jabor Highway project was announced in 1973 by the second Prime Minister, Tun Abdul Razak during the launch of the Central Terengganu Development Authority (Malay: Lembaga Kemajuan Terengganu Tengah (KETENGAH)). The highway was constructed as a means to speed up the development of the poorly-developed areas in the interior of Terengganu, just like the role of the Tun Razak Highway FT12 towards Pahang. Before the advent of the Jerangau–Jabor Highway FT14, the Federal Route 3 was the only major federal highway running within Terengganu. The construction of the FT14 highway had spawned many federal and state highways that link between the FT14 and FT3 highways. Two roads formed the pioneer route of the Federal Route 14, namely the Kuala Terengganu-Kuala Berang Road FT14/FT106 and the Ajil-Dungun Road FT14/FT132. Construction of highway began in 1977 and was completed in 1979.

The Jerangau–Jabor Highway FT14 is notorious for its recurring premature surface failures ever since the highway was under construction. Many sections along the highway are plagued with potholes, posing accident risks to road users. Overladen lorries are blamed for the road surface deterioration, as many of them do not obey the maximum axle weight limit of 9 tonnes. Lack of enforcement worsens the situation, evidenced by only one Road Transport Department enforcement station along the highway. On the other hand, the shorter Tun Razak Highway FT12 has two enforcement stations.

Since the Jerangau–Jabor Highway FT14 was opened to traffic in 1979, it served as the main backbone route from Pahang to Terengganu. However, after the East Coast Expressway Phase 2 E8 was opened, the daily traffic of the Jerangau–Jabor Highway FT14 had dropped by 80%. As a result, many towns along the FT14 highway that rely on passers-by as their main income source such as Ajil are now facing the threat of declining businesses by up to 40%.

== Junctions and town lists ==
Legend:

- I/C - Interchange, I/S - Intersection, RSA - Rest and service area, OBR - Overhead bridge restaurant, R/R - Restaurant and rest plaza, L/B - Layby, V/P - Vista point, TN - tunnel, T/P - Toll plaza, BR - Bridge
- C - Cloverleaf, S - Stack, T-A - Trumpet-A, T-B - Trumpet-B, DT - Directional-T/Y, SDT - Semi-Directional-T/Y, P-Y - Partial-Y, D - Diamond, P-C - Partial cloverleaf, D-D - Diverging diamond, D-R - Direct ramp

State	District	Location	km	mi	Name	Destinations	Notes
Terengganu	Kuala Terengganu	Kuala Terengganu			Cabang Tiga I/S	Jalan Tok Ku – Kampung Losong, Hiliran, Terengganu State Museum, Islamic Heritage Park FT 3 / AH18 Malaysia Federal Route 3 – Kota Bharu, Besut, Setiu, Kuala Nerus, City Centre, Marang, Seberang Takir, Sultan Mahmud Airport	Junctions
Terengganu	Kuala Terengganu	Wakaf Mempelam			Wakaf Mempelam I/S	T101 Jalan Wakaf Mempelam – Serada, Kedai Buloh	Dual T-junctions
Terengganu	Marang	Telaga Mengkudu			Padang Midin		
Terengganu	Marang	Telaga Mengkudu			Telaga Mengkudu; Telaga Mengkudu I/S	T100 Jalan Telaga Mengkudu – Banggol Kemang	T-junctions
Terengganu	Marang	Bukit Payong			Bukit Payong; Jalan Alor Limbat I/S	T102 Jalan Alor Limbat – Rawai, Alor Limbat	Junctions
Terengganu	Marang	Bukit Payong			Jalan Kedai Buluh I/S	T100 Jalan Kedai Buluh – Kedai Buluh, Chendering	T-junctions
Terengganu	Marang	Bukit Payong			Bukit Payung-Telemung Highway	FT 250 Bukit Payung–Telemung Highway – Telemung, Kuala Berang; East Coast Expressway – Kuala Terengganu, Kuala Lumpur; T171 Jalan Undang – Undang, Marang	Junctions
Terengganu	Marang	Bukit Payong			Jalan Teratak Batu I/S	T104 Jalan Teratak Batu – Sungai Serai, Teratak Batu, Marang	T-junctions
Terengganu	Marang	Bukit Payong			Jalan Alor Limbat I/S	T102 Jalan Alor Limbat – Rawai, Alor Limbat	T-junctions
Terengganu	Marang	Bukit Payong			Malaysian Fire and Rescue Department Academy		
Terengganu	Marang	Wakaf Tapai			Wakaf Tapai I/S	T2 Jalan Bukit Leban – Bukit Leban, Marang, Pulau Kapas ( Jetty)	T-junctions
Terengganu	Marang	Wakaf Tapai			Wakaf Tapai		
Terengganu	Marang	Wakaf Tapai			Sungai Marang bridge		
Terengganu	Hulu Terengganu	Ajil			Jalan Bukit Perpat I/S	Jalan Bukit Perpat – Bukit Perpat	T-junctions
Terengganu	Hulu Terengganu	Ajil			Jalan Kampung Jak I/S	T108 Jalan Kampung Jak – Kampung Jak	T-junctions
Terengganu	Hulu Terengganu	Ajil			Jalan Bukit Apit I/S	T110 Jalan Bukit Apit – Bukit Apit	T-junctions
Terengganu	Hulu Terengganu	Ajil			Ajil; Jalan Kuala Berang I/S	FT 106 Malaysia Federal Route 106 – Kuala Berang; FT 185 Second East–West Highway – Kenyir Lake ( Jetty), Gua Musang, Cameron Highlands, Ipoh; East Coast Expressway – Kuala Terengganu, Kuala Lumpur	T-junctions
Terengganu	Hulu Terengganu	Ajil			Kampung Tok Randok		
Terengganu	Hulu Terengganu	Ajil			Bukit Diman; Bukit Diman I/S	FT 249 Jalan FELDA Mengkawang–Bukit Diman – FELDA Mengkawang, Pengkalan Ajal, Pasir Niyor, Sungai Tersat (Site of the Terengganu Inscription Stone was discovered on 1899), Kampung Betung, Sekayu Waterfalls	T-junctions
Terengganu	Hulu Terengganu	Ajil			Kampung Pela		
Terengganu	Hulu Terengganu	Ajil			Kampung Tok Dor		
Terengganu	Hulu Terengganu	Ajil			Kampung Bukit Payung I/S	FT 1689 Jalan Jerangau Barat – FELDA Jerangau Barat	T-junctions
Terengganu	Hulu Terengganu	Ajil			Kampung Landas		
Terengganu	Dungun	Jerangau			Jerangau; Jalan Tok Kah Lintang I/S	T114 Jalan Tok Kah Lintang – Kampung Papan	T-junctions
Terengganu	Dungun	Jerangau			Sungai Dungun bridge		
Terengganu	Dungun	Bukit Besi			Kampung Panchor I/S	T123 Jalan Kampung Wa – Kampung Wa Baharu, Kampung Pinang	T-junctions
Terengganu	Dungun	Bukit Besi			Kampung Dendang Baharu		
Terengganu	Dungun	Bukit Besi			Jalan Sungai Ceralak	T125 Jalan Sungai Ceralak – Pasir Raja, Sungai Ceralak Waterfall	T-junctions
Terengganu	Dungun	Bukit Besi			Bukit Besi Highway	FT 132 Bukit Besi Highway – Dungun; East Coast Expressway – Kuala Terengganu, Kuala Lumpur	T-junctions
Terengganu	Dungun	Bukit Besi			Bukit Besi		
Terengganu	Dungun	Bukit Besi			Kampung Kuala Talam		
Terengganu	Dungun	Bandar Al-Muktafi Billah Shah			Bandar Al Muktafi Billah Shah Restaurant and Rest Plaza		
Terengganu	Dungun	Bandar Al-Muktafi Billah Shah			Bandar Al-Muktafi Billah Shah	Jalan Sultan Zainal Abidin 1 – BAMBS Town Centre, Taman Mulia, Masjid Sultan Mahmud Al-Muktafi Billah Shah, Lembaga Kemajuan Terengganu Tengah (Central Terengganu Development Authority (Ketengah)) main headquarters	T-junctions
Terengganu	Dungun	Bandar Al-Muktafi Billah Shah			Jalan Pasir Raja I/S	FT 128 Malaysia Federal Route 128 – Pasir Raja, Cemerong Waterfall, Sungai Cheralak Waterfall	T-junctions
Terengganu	Dungun	Bandar Al-Muktafi Billah Shah			Sungai Paka bridge		
Terengganu	Dungun	Bandar Al-Muktafi Billah Shah			SPT RISDA Kemaman Streroom		T-junctions
Terengganu	Dungun	Bandar Al-Muktafi Billah Shah			Sungai Paka bridge		
Terengganu	Dungun	Bandar Al-Muktafi Billah Shah			Ketengah Highway	FT 122 Ketengah Highway – Bandar Ketengah Jaya, Paka, Kerteh; East Coast Expressway – Kuala Terengganu, Kuala Lumpur	T-junctions
Terengganu	Kemaman	Air Putih			Kampung Kubu		
Terengganu	Kemaman	Air Putih			Kubu I/S	FT 124 Malaysia Federal Route 124 – Bandar Sri Bandi, Kemasik, Chukai, Kerteh, Kijal; East Coast Expressway – Kuala Terengganu, Kuala Lumpur	T-junctions
Terengganu	Kemaman	Air Putih			Kampung Pelantuh		
Terengganu	Kemaman	Air Putih			Air Putih; Air Putih I/S	FT 237 Jalan Air Putih – Kampung Darat Air Putih, Chukai; East Coast Expressway – Kuala Terengganu, Kuala Lumpur	Junctions
Terengganu	Kemaman	Air Putih			Sungai Kemaman bridge		
Terengganu	Kemaman	Air Putih			Sungai Paluh Jenang bridge		
Terengganu	Kemaman	Air Putih			Chenih; Jalan Bandar Cerul I/S	FT 126 Malaysia Federal Route 126 – Bandar Cerul	T-junctions
Terengganu	Kemaman	Air Putih			Sungai Chenih bridge		
Terengganu	Kemaman	Air Putih			Bandar Chenih Bahru; Jalan Mak Lagam I/S	T124 Jalan Mak Lagam – Chukai (Kemaman), Kuala Kemaman, Kolej Kemahiran Tinggi MARA (KKTM) Kemaman	T-junctions
Terengganu	Kemaman	Air Putih			Bandar Chenih Baharu Shell RSA		
Terengganu	Kemaman	Air Putih			Bandar Chenih Bahru		
Terengganu	Kemaman	Air Putih			Chenih–ECE I/C	East Coast Expressway – Kuala Terengganu, Kijal, Chukai, Jabur, Kuantan, Kuala Lumpur	T-junctions
Terengganu	Kemaman	Air Putih			Kampung Sungai Pergam		
Terengganu	Kemaman	Jabur			Jabur; Jalan Semambu I/S	FT 3486 Jalan Semambu – Semambu	T-junctions
Pahang	Kuantan	Gebeng			Jabur (East) I/C	FT 101 / AH141 Gebeng Bypass – Gebeng, Kuantan Port, Chukai (Kemaman), Cherating, Akademi Maritim Sultan Ahmad Shah Maritime Academy (AMSAS) (Malaysian Maritime Enforcement Agency (MMEA) Academy) East Coast Expressway / AH141 – Kuala Terengganu, Chukai (Kemaman), Gambang, Kuala Lumpur; Jalan Desa Aspa – Aspa Cottage	Multi-level stacked roundabout interchange
Pahang	Kuantan	Gebeng	0.0	0.0	Kuantan Bypass I/C	FT 3 / AH18 Kuantan Bypass – Kuala Terengganu, Chukai (Kemaman), Kuantan Port, Kuantan, Johor Bahru, Kuala Lumpur	Trumpet interchange
1.000 mi = 1.609 km; 1.000 km = 0.621 mi

== See also ==
- Malaysia Federal Route 3 - the coastal counterpart of the Jerangau–Jabor Highway FT14
