= Malaysia Federal Route 132 =

Road in Malaysia

Federal Route 132
- Bukit Besi Highway

Route information
- Maintained by Malaysian Public Works Department
- Length: 31.40 km (19.51 mi)

Major junctions
- West end: Bukit Besi
- FT 14 Federal Route 14; East Coast Expressway FT 3 / AH18 Federal Route 3
- East end: Dungun

Location
- Country: Malaysia
- Primary destinations: Jerangau, Kuala Dungun

Highway system
- Highways in Malaysia; Expressways; Federal; State

Federal Route 132, or Bukit Besi Highway, is a major highway in Terengganu, Malaysia. The Kilometre Zero of the Federal Route 132 starts at Dungun.

At most sections, the Federal Route 132 was built under the JKR R5 road standard, with a speed limit of 90 km/h.

== Junction lists ==
The entire route is located in Dungun District, Terengganu.

Legend:

- I/C - Interchange, I/S - Intersection, RSA - Rest and service area, OBR - Overhead bridge restaurant, R/R - Restaurant and rest plaza, L/B - Layby, V/P - Vista point, TN - tunnel, T/P - Toll plaza, BR - Bridge
- C - Cloverleaf, S - Stack, T-A - Trumpet-A, T-B - Trumpet-B, DT - Directional-T/Y, SDT - Semi-Directional-T/Y, P-Y - Partial-Y, D - Diamond, P-C - Partial cloverleaf, D-D - Diverging diamond, D-R - Direct ramp

| Location | km | mi | Name | Destinations | Notes |
|---|---|---|---|---|---|
| Bukit Besi | 31.40 | 19.51 | Bukit Besi | FT 14 Malaysia Federal Route 14 – Kuala Terengganu, Kuala Berang, Jerangau, Bandar Al-Muktafi Billah Shah, Kuantan | T-junctions |
| Bukit Besi | | | Kampung Pinang | T123 Jalan Kampung Wa – Kampung Wa Baharu, Kampung Pancur | T-junctions |
| Bukit Besi | | | Bukit Besi-ECE | East Coast Expressway – Kuala Terengganu, Telemung, Ajil, Paka, Kuantan, Kuala Lumpur | T-junctions |
| Bukit Besi | | | Railway crossing | | |
| Kuala Dungun | | | Kampung Pulut | | |
| Kuala Dungun | | | Kampung Padang Pulut | | |
| Kuala Dungun | | | Kampung Legong | | |
| Kuala Dungun | | | Jalan Durian Mentangau | T118 Jalan Durian Mentangau – Durian Mentangau, Kampung Luit, Lubuk Pauh; East Coast Expressway – Kuala Terengganu, Kuala Lumpur | T-junctions |
| Kuala Dungun | | | Kampung Che Lijah | | |
| Kuala Dungun | 0.0 | 0.0 | Kuala Dungun | FT 3 / AH18 Malaysia Federal Route 3 – Kuala Terengganu, Marang, Rantau Abang, Tanjung Jara, Paka, Kerteh, Chukai, Kuantan | T-junctions |
1.000 mi = 1.609 km; 1.000 km = 0.621 mi
