= Gebeng Bypass =

Road in Malaysia

Federal Route 101
- Gebeng Bypass

Route information
- Part of AH141
- Maintained by Malaysian Public Works Department
- Length: 13.70 km (8.51 mi)
- Existed: 2003–present
- History: Completed in 2006

Major junctions
- West end: Jabur Interchange East Coast Expressway / AH141

- East Coast Expressway / AH141; FT 14 Federal Route 14; FT 3485 Jalan Kawasan Perindustrian Gebeng FT 3 / AH18 Federal Route 3
- East end: Gebeng

Location
- Country: Malaysia
- Primary destinations: Jabur, Bandar Al-Muktafi Billah Shah, Gebeng Industrial Area, Malaysia-China Kuantan Industrial Park, Kuantan Port, Cherating, Chukai (Kemaman)

Highway system
- Highways in Malaysia; Expressways; Federal; State

Gebeng Bypass, Federal Route 101, AH141, is a controlled-access highway connecting Jabur, Terengganu to Gebeng near Kuantan Port, Pahang, Malaysia.

== Route background ==
The Kilometre Zero of Federal Route 101 starts at Gebeng Interchange, at its interchange with the Federal Route 3, the main trunk road of the east coast of Peninsular Malaysia.

== History ==
The highway is part of the East Coast Expressway Phase 1 project (Karak - Jabur). Construction began on 2003 and was opened to traffic in December 2006. Meanwhile, the next sections between Jabur Interchange of the East Coast Expressway to Jabur was opened to traffic on 15 July 2007. In 2012, the highway was gazetted as Federal Route 101.

== Features ==
- Aspa Cottage.
- Gebeng Industrial Area.
  - BASF-Petronas petrochemical plant.
  - Lynas Malaysia
    Lynas Advanced Materials Plant (LAMP).
- Malaysia-China Kuantan Industrial Park is a joint venture industrial park between Malaysia and the People's Republic of China.
- Akademi Maritim Sultan Ahmad Shah (AMSAS), the Malaysian Maritime Enforcement Agency (MMEA) Academy.

At most sections, the Gebeng Bypass was built under the JKR R5 road standard, allowing maximum speed limit of up to 90 km/h.

There are no overlaps, alternate routes, or sections with motorcycle lanes.

== Junction lists ==
Legend:

- I/C - Interchange, I/S - Intersection, RSA - Rest and service area, OBR - Overhead bridge restaurant, R/R - Restaurant and rest plaza, L/B - Layby, V/P - Vista point, TN - tunnel, T/P - Toll plaza, BR - Bridge
- C - Cloverleaf, S - Stack, T-A - Trumpet-A, T-B - Trumpet-B, DT - Directional-T/Y, SDT - Semi-Directional-T/Y, P-Y - Partial-Y, D - Diamond, P-C - Partial cloverleaf, D-D - Diverging diamond, D-R - Direct ramp

State	District	Location	km	mi	Exit	Name	Destinations	Notes
Terengganu	Kemaman	Jabur			836	Jabur-ECE I/C	East Coast Expressway / AH141 – Kuala Terengganu, Chukai, Cheneh, Kuantan, Gambang, Kuala Lumpur	Trumpet interchange
Terengganu	Kemaman	Jabur			Jabur estate bridge			
Terengganu	Kemaman	Jabur			Jabut Toll Plaza			
Terengganu	Kemaman	Jabur			Jabur swamp bridge			
Pahang	Kuantan	Gebeng				Jabur (East) I/C	FT 14 Malaysia Federal Route 14 – Jabur town centre, Bandar Al-Muktafi Billah Shah, Bukit Besi, Jerangau, Kuantan, Bandar Indera Mahkota, Sultan Haji Ahmad Shah Airport; Jalan Desa Aspa – Aspa Cottage	Multi-level stacked roundabout interchange
Pahang	Kuantan	Gebeng				MCKIP I/C	Persiaran MCKIP – Malaysia–China Kuantan Industrial Park (MCKIP)	Diamond interchange
Pahang	Kuantan	Gebeng			Sungai Baluk bridge			
Pahang	Kuantan	Gebeng				Gebeng Industrial Area Exit	FT 3485 Jalan Gebeng 1/1 – Gebeng Industrial Area, BASF-Petronas petrochemical plant, Lynas Malaysia, Lynas Advanced Materials Plant (LAMP)	Jabur bound
Pahang	Kuantan	Gebeng				Reserve I/C		Cloverleaf interchange
Pahang	Kuantan	Gebeng				AMSAS ((MMEA) Academy)	Akademi Maritim Sultan Ahmad Shah (AMSAS) (Malaysian Maritime Enforcement Agency (MMEA) Academy)	
Pahang	Kuantan	Gebeng			Railway crossing bridge			
Pahang	Kuantan	Gebeng	0.0	0.0		Gebeng I/C	FT 3 / AH18 Malaysia Federal Route 3 – Chukai (Kemaman), Kuala Terengganu, Cherating, Kuantan Port, Gebeng Industrial Park, Kuantan, Beserah	Trumpet interchange
1.000 mi = 1.609 km; 1.000 km = 0.621 mi: Incomplete access; Proposed
