= Malaysia Federal Route 128 =

Federal road in Malaysia

Federal Route 128
- Jalan Pasir Raja; Jalan Jerangau-Jabor (Penghantar 6)

Route information
- Length: 12.38 km (7.69 mi)

Major junctions
- Northwest end: Jongok Batu
- T125 Jalan Sungai Ceralak; FT 14 Jerangau-Jabor Highway
- Southeast end: FT 14 Jerangau-Jabor Highway

Location
- Country: Malaysia
- Primary destinations: Pasir Raja; Sungai Ceralak Waterfall

Highway system
- Highways in Malaysia; Expressways; Federal; State

Federal Route 128, or Jalan Pasir Raja and Jalan Jerangau-Jabor (Penghantar 6), is a federal road in Terengganu, Malaysia. The Kilometre Zero of the Federal Route 128 starts at Bandar Al-Muktafi Billah Shah.

== Features ==
At most sections, the Federal Route 128 was built under the JKR R5 road standard, allowing maximum speed limit of up to 90 km/h.

== List of junctions and towns ==
Km	Exit	Junctions	To	Remarks
		Jongok Batu	T125 Jalan Sungai Ceralak Northeast; Bukit Besi; Jerangau Southwest; Sungai Ceralak Waterfall	T-junctions
		Pasir Raja	Cemerong Waterfall	
		Sungai Jengai bridge		
		Hutan Rizab Bandar Al-Muktafi Billah Shah		
FT 128; 0		FT 14 Jerangau-Jabor Highway	FT 14 Jerangau-Jabor Highway North; FT 14 Kuala Terengganu; FT 14 Jerangau; FT 14 Bukit Besi; FT 14 Bandar Al-Muktafi Billah Shah South; FT 14 Kuantan; FT 14 Bandar Chenih Baharu; FT 14 Bandar Seri Bandi; FT 122 Dungun; East Coast Expressway East Coast Expressway; Kuala Terengganu; Kuantan; Kuala Lumpur	T-junctions
