= Malaysia Federal Route 126 =

Road in Malaysia

Federal Route 126
- Jalan Cerul; Jalan Jerangau-Jabor (Penghantar 1)

Route information
- Length: 9.72 km (6.04 mi)

Major junctions
- West end: Bandar Cherul
- FT 14 Jerangau-Jabor Highway
- East end: Kampung Chenih

Location
- Country: Malaysia
- Primary destinations: Bandar Chenih Baharu

Highway system
- Highways in Malaysia; Expressways; Federal; State

Federal Route 126, or Jalan Cerul and Jalan Jerangau-Jabor (Penghantar 1), is a federal road in Terengganu, Malaysia. The Kilometre Zero of the Federal Route 126 starts at Kampung Chenih.

== Features ==
At most sections, the Federal Route 126 was built under the JKR R5 road standard, allowing maximum speed limit of up to 90 km/h.

== List of junctions and towns ==
| Km | Exit | Junctions | To | Remarks |
|---|---|---|---|---|
| | | Bandar Cherul | | |
| | | Chenih Malay Reserve | | |
| | | Kampung Chenih | FT 14 Jerangau-Jabor Highway North; FT 14 Kuala Terengganu; FT 14 Bukit Besi; FT 14 Bandar Al-Muktafi Billah Shah South; FT 14 Kuantan; FT 14 Jabur; FT 14 Bandar Chenih Baharu; FT 14 Chukai (Kemaman); FT 101 AH141 Gebeng; FT 101 AH141 Kuantan Port; East Coast Expressway East Coast Expressway; Kuala Terengganu; Kuantan; Kuala Lumpur | T-junctions |
