= Malaysia Federal Route 3485 =

Road in Malaysia

Federal Route 3485
- Jalan Kawasan Perindustrian Gebeng (Jalan Gebeng 1/11)

Route information
- Maintained by Malaysian Public Works Department
- Length: 3.5 km (2.2 mi)

Major junctions
- East end: FT 3 AH18 Jalan Kemaman

- FT 3 AH18 Jalan Kemaman; FT 101 AH141 Gebeng Bypass

- West end: FT 101 AH141 Gebeng Bypass

Location
- Country: Malaysia
- Primary destinations: Semambu

Highway system
- Highways in Malaysia; Expressways; Federal; State

Jalan Kawasan Perindustrian Gebeng, or Jalan Gebeng 1/11, Federal Route 3485, is an industrial federal road in Pahang state, Malaysia.

At most sections, the Federal Route 3486 was built under the JKR R5 road standard, allowing maximum speed limit of up to 90 km/h.

== List of junctions ==
Km	Exit	Junctions	To	Remarks
		FT 3 Jalan Kemaman	FT 3 AH18 Jalan Kemaman North; FT 3 AH18 Kuantan Port; FT 3 AH18 Kuala Terengganu; FT 3 AH18 Chukai (Kemaman); FT 101 AH141 Jabur; East Coast Expressway AH141 East Coast Expressway; Kuala Lumpur; Kuala Terengganu Southwest; FT 3 AH18 Kuantan; FT 3 AH18 Johor Bahru; FT 2 Gambang	T-junctions
		Jalan Gebeng 1/6	South; Jalan Gebeng 1/6	T-junctions
		Sungai Balok bridge		
		ECX Excel Wire Sdn Bhd		
		RP Chemicals Sdn Bhd		
		PETRONAS Chemicals MTBE Sdn. Bhd.		
		Jalan Gebeng 1/1 - Jalan Gebeng 2/3	North; Jalan Gebeng 2/3 South; Jalan Gebeng 1/1	Junctions
		Polyplastics Asia Sdn Bhd		
		Jalan Gebeng 2/2	Northeast; Jalan Gebeng 2/2; Pusat Komersil Gebeng	T-junctions
		Jalan Gebeng 2/9	Southwest; Jalan Gebeng 2/9	T-junctions
		Jalan Gebeng 2/2	Northeast; Jalan Gebeng 2/2; Pusat Komersil Gebeng	T-junctions
		BASF Petronas Chemicals Sdn. Bhd.		
		Jalan Gebeng 2/6	Northeast; Jalan Gebeng 2/6; Gebeng Railway Station (Kerteh-Kuantan Port Railway Line)	T-junctions
		Jalan Gebeng 2/7	Northeast; Jalan Gebeng 2/7; Lynas Malaysia; Lynas Advanced Materials Plant (LAMP)	T-junctions
		FT 101 Gebeng Bypass	FT 101 AH141 Gebeng Bypass Southwest Only; FT 101 AH141 Jabur; East Coast Expressway AH141 East Coast Expressway; Kuala Lumpur; Kuala Terengganu	T-junctions
