= Tenggol Island =

Island in Malaysia

Native name: Pulau Tenggol ڤولاو تيڠڬول Pula Tenggo
- Interactive map of Tenggol Island

Geography
- Location: South China Sea
- Coordinates: 4°48′N 103°41′E
- Archipelago: Tenggol Islands
- Area: 2.62 km^{2} (1.01 sq mi)
- Highest elevation: 272 m (892 ft)

Administration
- Malaysia
- State: Terengganu
- District: Dungun
- Mukim: Kuala Dungun

Additional information
- Time zone: MST (UTC+8)
- Postal code: 23000

Tenggol Island (Malay: Pulau Tenggol, Terengganuan: Pula Tenggo) is an island around 24 kilometres (15 mi) off the coast of Terengganu, Malaysia. It is the last island in a string of islands that include Pulau Perhentian and Pulau Redang. It is connected by ferry to Kuala Dungun on the mainland.

The island was traditionally uninhabited, but now contains a resort. Vietnamese boat people were stranded on the island in the aftermath of the Vietnam War.

== Archipelago ==
| Island | Area (km^{2}) |
|---|---|
| Tenggol | 2.617 |
| Nyirih | 0.201 |
| Tokong Burung | 0.007 |
| Total | 2.825 |
