= Terengganu State Route T124 =

Road in Malaysia

Terengganu Route 124
- Jalan Mak Lagam

Major junctions
- West end: Chenih
- FT 14 Federal Route 14 FT 3 / AH18 Federal Route 3
- East end: Chukai; Geliga

Location
- Country: Malaysia
- Primary destinations: Kampung Mak Lagam

Highway system
- Highways in Malaysia; Expressways; Federal; State

Jalan Mak Lagam, Terengganu State Toute T124 is a major road in Terengganu, Malaysia.

== Junction lists ==
The entire route is located in Kemaman District, Terengganu.

Legend:

- I/C - Interchange, I/S - Intersection, RSA - Rest and service area, OBR - Overhead bridge restaurant, R/R - Restaurant and rest plaza, L/B - Layby, V/P - Vista point, TN - tunnel, T/P - Toll plaza, BR - Bridge

Location	km	Name	Destinations	Notes
Chenih		Chenih	FT 14 Malaysia Federal Route 14 – Kuala Terengganu, Bandar Al-Muktafi Billah Shah, Bandar Cerul, Bandar Chenih Baharu, Jabur, Kuantan; East Coast Expressway – Kuala Terengganu, Kuala Lumpur	T-junctions
Chenih		Bandar Chenih Baharu RSA and Shell (westbound)		
Chenih		Sungai Cerul bridge		
Chenih		Kampung Mak Lagam		
Chenih		KKTM Kemaman	Kolej Kemahiran Tinggi MARA (KKTM) Kemaman	
Chenih		Jalan Paya Berenjut	Jalan Paya Berenjut – Paya Berenjut	T-junctions
Chenih		Kampung Dato' Ibrahim Fikri		
Geliga		Geliga Industrial Area		
Geliga		Chukai; Geliga	FT 3 / AH18 – Kuala Terengganu, Dungun, Chukai town centre, Kuala Kemaman, Cherating, Kuantan	T-junctions
1.000 mi = 1.609 km; 1.000 km = 0.621 mi
