= Largest cities in Terengganu =

This is a list of the largest cities and towns based on population in state of Terengganu, Malaysia.

Rank	District	City/Town	Population as 2010
1	Kuala Terengganu	Kuala Terengganu	337,553
2	Kemaman	Chukai	89,340
3	Dungun	Dungun	73,341
4	Besut	Jerteh	39,064
5	Dungun	Paka	30,982
6	Marang	Bukit Payong	26,790
7	Hulu Terengganu	Kuala Berang	25,172
8	Kemaman	Kerteh	24,152
9	Marang	Marang	18,209
10	Besut	Kuala Besut	16,337
