= Cemerung Falls =

Waterfall is located in the Dungun District, Malaysia

- Location within Terengganu
- Location: Dungun District, Terengganu, Malaysia
- Coordinates: 4°39′33.2″N 102°59′17.1″E

The Cemerung Falls is located in the Dungun District, Terengganu state in Malaysia. It is estimated to be 250 metres tall.

Reaching the Cemerong fall is quite an expedition because of its remoteness and lack of signage. From Kuantan, one has to follow the Inland Highway to Kuala Terengganu. There is a river halfway, known as the Paka river. The first road to the left in front of the river leads to a junction, which is at the coordinates 04° 35.854' N 103° 12.542' E. From this junction, it is about 30 km on a tarred road to the Entrance of the Recreation Park.

From the coastal highway, one can cross over to the Inland one at Kemaman or Dungun.

== See also ==
- List of waterfalls
