= Malaysia Federal Route 237 =

Road in Malaysia

Federal Route 237
- Jalan Chukai-Air Putih

Route information
- Maintained by Malaysian Public Works Department
- Length: 28.00 km (17.40 mi)

Major junctions
- West end: Kampung Darat Air Putih
- FT 14 Federal Route 14; East Coast Expressway FT 3 / AH18 Federal Route 3
- East end: Chukai

Location
- Country: Malaysia
- Primary destinations: Padang Air Putih, Pasir Gajah

Highway system
- Highways in Malaysia; Expressways; Federal; State

Federal Route 237, or Jalan Chukai-Air Putih (formerly Terengganu State Route T8), is a federal road in Terengganu, Malaysia. It is also a main route to East Coast Expressway via Chukai Interchange

The Kilometre Zero of the Federal Route 237 is at Chukai.

== Features ==
At most sections, the Federal Route 237 was built under the JKR R5 road standard, allowing maximum speed limit of up to 90 km/h.

== Junction lists ==
The entire route is located in Kemaman District, Terengganu.

Legend:

- I/C - Interchange, I/S - Intersection, RSA - Rest and service area, OBR - Overhead bridge restaurant, R/R - Restaurant and rest plaza, L/B - Layby, V/P - Vista point, TN - tunnel, T/P - Toll plaza, BR - Bridge
- C - Cloverleaf, S - Stack, T-A - Trumpet-A, T-B - Trumpet-B, DT - Directional-T/Y, SDT - Semi-Directional-T/Y, P-Y - Partial-Y, D - Diamond, P-C - Partial cloverleaf, D-D - Diverging diamond, D-R - Direct ramp

Location	km	mi	Name	Destinations	Notes
Air Putih			Kampung Darat Air Putih		
Air Putih			Kampung Teladas		
Air Putih			Sungai Kemaman bridge		
Air Putih			Padang Air Putih	FT 14 Malaysia Federal Route 14 – Kuala Terengganu, Bandar Al-Muktafi Billah Shah, Bandar Chenih Bahru, Bandar Cerul, Jabur, Kuantan	Junctions
Air Putih			Kampung Dadung		
Air Putih			Kampung Tebak	T133 Jalan Lubuk Batu – Lubuk Batu	T-junctions
Air Putih			Sungai Lubuk Batu bridge		
Air Putih			Kampung Rantau Panjang Hilir	T130 Jalan Rantau Panjang Hulu – Kampung Rantau Panjang Hulu	T-junctions
Air Putih			Kampung Pasir Pemanggang		
Air Putih			Kampung Machang Setahun	T130 Jalan Seberang Tayor – Seberang Tayor	T-junctions
Air Putih			Kampung Sungai Pinang		
Air Putih			Kampung Pasir Semut		
Air Putih			Jalan MARDI	Jalan MARDI	T-junctions
Air Putih			Pasir Gajah		
Chukai			Chukai-ECE	East Coast Expressway – Kuala Terengganu, Kerteh, Kijal, Chenih, Kuantan, Kuala Lumpur	T-junctions
Chukai			Jalan Ibuk	T13 Jalan Ibuk – Paman, Ibuk	T-junctions
Chukai			Kampung Gong Kapur		
Chukai			Kampung Janda		
Chukai			Kampung Cik Ibrahim Daud		
Chukai			Kampung Batu Empat	T128 Jalan Pasir Minal – Pasir Minal	T-junctions
Chukai			Kampung Pulau Tempurung	T135 Jalan Pengkalan Pandan – Kampung Pengkalan Pandan	T-junctions
Chukai			Chukai; Kampung Jaya	T131 Jalan Bukit Takar – Bukit Takar, Ibuk	T-junctions
Chukai			Chukai; Kampung Gong Limau		
Chukai			Chukai		
Chukai	0.0	0.0	Chukai	FT 3 / AH18 Malaysia Federal Route 3 – Kuala Terengganu, Dungun, Kerteh, Kuala Kemaman, Cherating, Kuantan; Jalan Sulaiman – Town Centre	Junctions
1.000 mi = 1.609 km; 1.000 km = 0.621 mi
