= Malaysia Federal Route 3486 =

Road in Malaysia

Federal Route 3486
- Jalan Semambu

Route information
- Maintained by Malaysian Public Works Department
- Length: 16.0 km (9.9 mi)

Major junctions
- North end: Jabur
- FT 14 Jerangau Highway; FT 2 Jalan Beserah
- South end: Kuantan

Location
- Country: Malaysia
- Primary destinations: Semambu

Highway system
- Highways in Malaysia; Expressways; Federal; State

Jalan Semambu, Federal Route 3486 (formerly Pahang and Terengganu state route C15 or T15), is an industrial federal road in Pahang and Terengganu state, Malaysia.

At most sections, the Federal Route 3486 was built under the JKR R5 road standard, with a speed limit of 90 km/h.

== List of junctions ==
Km	Exit	Junctions	To	Remarks
		Jabur	FT 14 Jerangau Highway North; Kuala Terengganu; Jerangau; Bandar Al-Muktafi Billah Shah Southeast; Gebeng; Kuantan; Kuala Lumpur	T-junctions
		Perasing		
		Jabur Estate		
		Kampung Cina		
		Kampung Alur Batu		
		Kampung Durian		
		Kampung Bukit Rambutan		
كمامن; Kemaman
Terengganu Darul Iman; Kemaman district border
Terengganu-Pahang border
Pahang Darul Makmur; Kuantan district border
		Semambu		
		Semambu-Kuantan Bypass	Northwest; Jalan Semambu-Pintasan Kuantan; Politeknik Sultan Haji Ahmad Shah (POLISAS); FT 3 AH18 Kuantan Bypass; Kuala Lumpur; Gambang; Chukai (Kemaman); Kuala Terengganu	T-junctions
		Semambu Industrial Area		
		Jalan Air Putih		
		Jalan Dato' Lim Hoe Lek		
		Kuantan; Jalan Beserah	FT 2 Jalan Beserah Northeast; Beserah; Chukai (Kemaman); Kuala Terengganu South; Town Centre; Pekan; Kuala Lumpur; Teluk Cempedak	T-junctions
