= Malaysia Federal Route 249 =

Road in Malaysia

Federal Route 249
- Jalan FELDA Mengkawang-Bukit Diman

Route information
- Length: 13.2 km (8.2 mi)

Major junctions
- Southwest end: FELDA Mengkawang
- FT 14 Jerangau-Jabor Highway
- Northeast end: Bukit Diman

Location
- Country: Malaysia
- Primary destinations: Pengkalan Ajal

Highway system
- Highways in Malaysia; Expressways; Federal; State

Federal Route 249, or Jalan FELDA Mengkawang-Bukit Diman (formerly Terengganu State Route T117), is a federal road in Terengganu, Malaysia. The Kilometre Zero is at Bukit Diman.

== Features ==
At most sections, the Federal Route 249 was built under the JKR R5 road standard, with a speed limit of 90 km/h.

== List of junctions and towns ==
Km	Exit	Junctions	To	Remarks
		FELDA Mengkawang	North; T115 Jalan Sekayu; Kuala Berang; Pasir Niyor; Sekayu; Sungai Tersat (Site of the Terengganu Inscription Stone was discovered on 1899); Kampung Betung; Sekayu Waterfalls	T-junctions
		FELDA Mengkawang		
		Kampung Lubuk Periok		
		Kampung Baharu Lubuk Periok		
		Kampung Baharu		
		Sungai Berang bridge		
		Kampung Bukit Mengawan		
		Kampung Matang		
		Pengkalan Ajal		
		Sungai Berang bridge		
		Pengkalan Ajal	North; T113 Jalan Lenjang; Kuala Berang; Lenjang; Ajil	T-junctions
		Kampung Kua		
		Kampung Machang		
FT 249; 0		Bukit Diman	FT 14 Jerangau-Jabor Highway North; FT 14 Kuala Terengganu; FT 106 Kuala Berang; FT 14 Ajil; East Coast Expressway East Coast Expressway; Kota Bharu; Kuala Terengganu; Kuala Lumpur; Kuantan South; FT 3 AH18 Kuantan; FT 14 Bandar Al-Muktafi Billah Shah; FT 14 Bukit Besi; FT 14 Jerangau	T-junctions
