= Kuala Dungun =

Kuala Dungun Kole Dungung (Terengganu Malay)
- Town
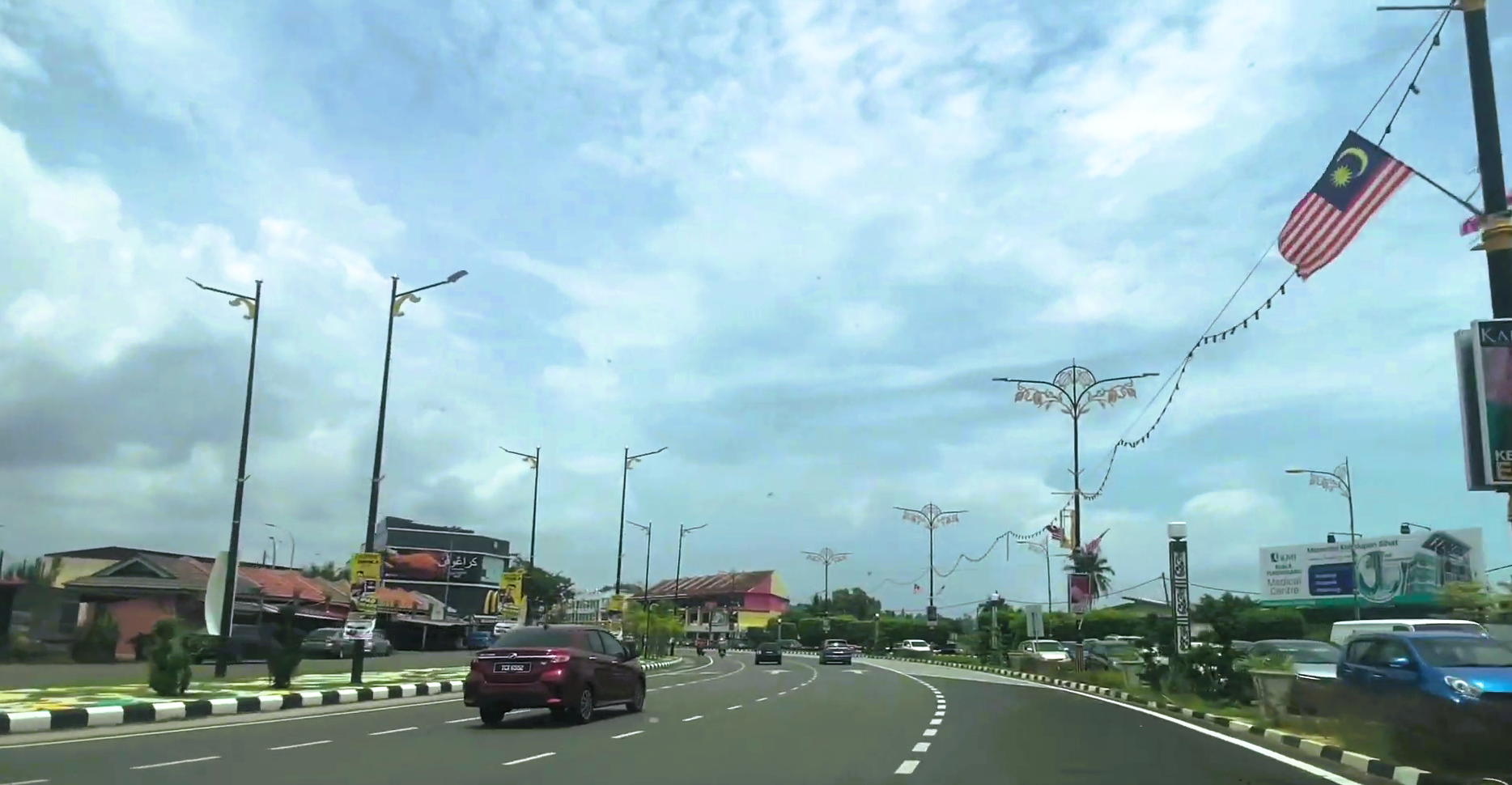
- Downtown Kuala Dungun

- Location in Terengganu
- Coordinates: 4°45′22.2″N 103°24′33.5″E
- Country: Malaysia
- State: Terengganu
- District: Dungun
- Establishment of town board: 1953
- Establishment of town council: 1973
- Establishment of district council: 1 January 1981
- Municipality status: 21 August 2008
- Time zone: UTC+8 (MST)
- Postal code: 23000
- Area code: 09

Kuala Dungun (Terengganu Malay: Kole Dungung) is a mukim and the capital of Dungun District, Terengganu, Malaysia. It is situated midway between Tanjung Jara and Paka.

Location of Kuala Dungun within Dungun District

== Etymology ==
The name "Kuala Dungun" is derived from the local Malay word "kuala", which means the mouth of a river, and "Dungun", which is the name of the district in which the mukim is located.

== Geography ==
Kuala Dungun is located at the mouth of the Dungun River, which flows into the South China Sea. It is bordered by the mukims of Jerangau to the north, Pasir Raja to the east, Hulu Paka to the south, and Paka to the west.

The mukim comprises several villages, including Kampung Baru Kuala Dungun, Kampung Tanjung Jati, Kampung Jabi, Kampung Sura Tengah, and Kampung Pengkalan Ajal.

== Demographics ==
As of 2020, the population of Kuala Dungun was estimated to be around 20,000–30,000. The majority of the population are Malays, with Chinese and Indian minorities.

== Economy ==
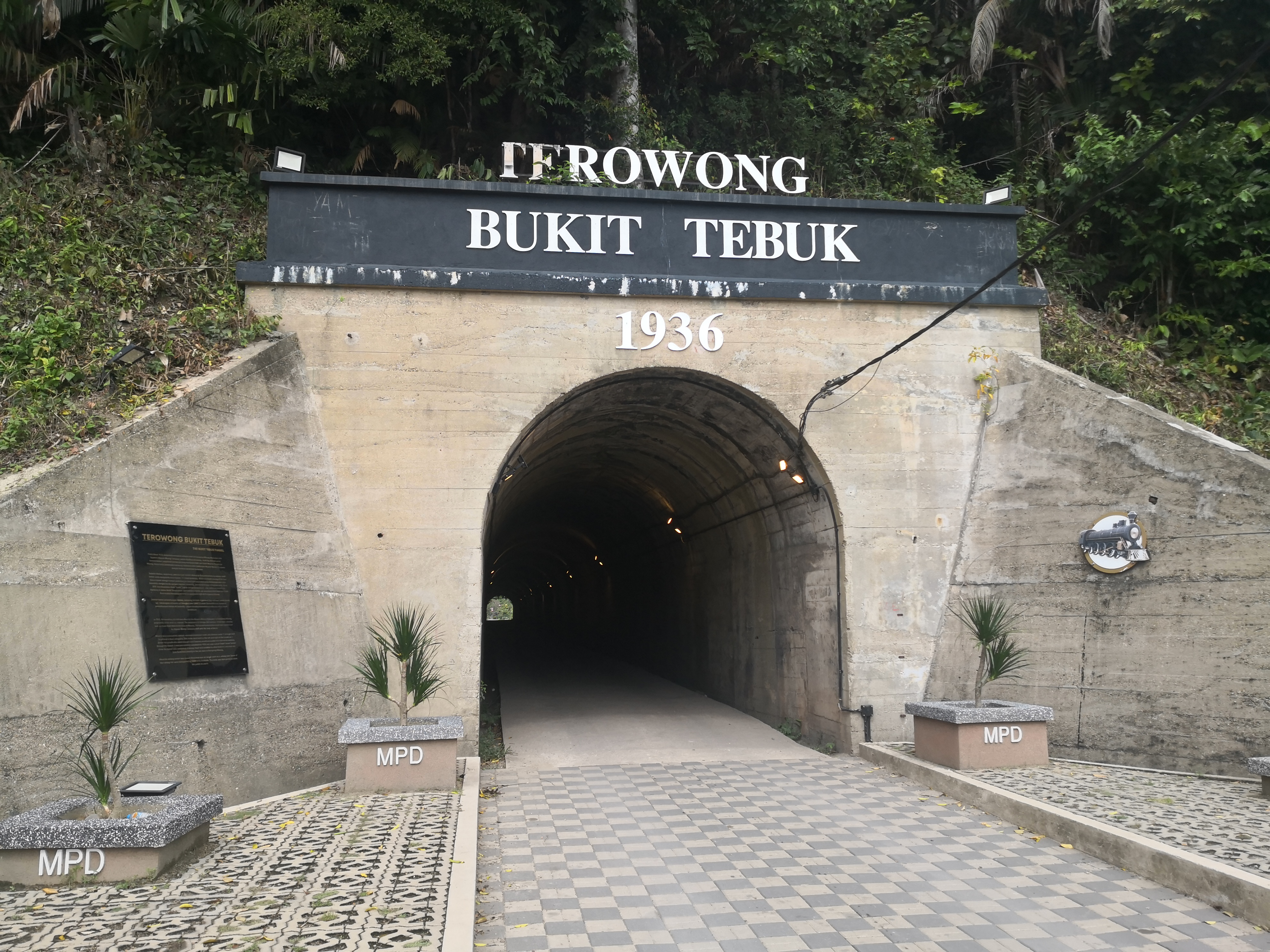
Bukit Tebuk Tunnel (1936)

During the 1940s iron-mining boom, extraction took place at Bukit Besi, a modest town inland to the west, and Kuala Dungun served as the seaport for shipping out the iron ore mined from the mountains. A railway between them not only moved iron to the docks but also doubled as the local passenger line for villagers, the Dungun township, and nearby businesses. When the mines were gradually closed-down in the 1970s and 1980s due to the lack of investment in the iron industry and the lack of miners, the rail service stopped and the mining company left the area. Therefore, the only remnant from the iron mining era is a tunnel that is called Bukit Tebuk Tunnel. The tunnel was originally carved to shorten the trains transportation distances from the mines in Bukit Besi to Pengkalan Nibong. Once the mining activities closed, it was repaved for automobile use.

Nowadays, Kuala Dungun is known for its fishing industry, with many of the locals engaged in fishing and related activities. Agriculture is also an important economic activity in the mukim, with crops such as rubber, palm oil, and coconut being grown.

== Transportation ==
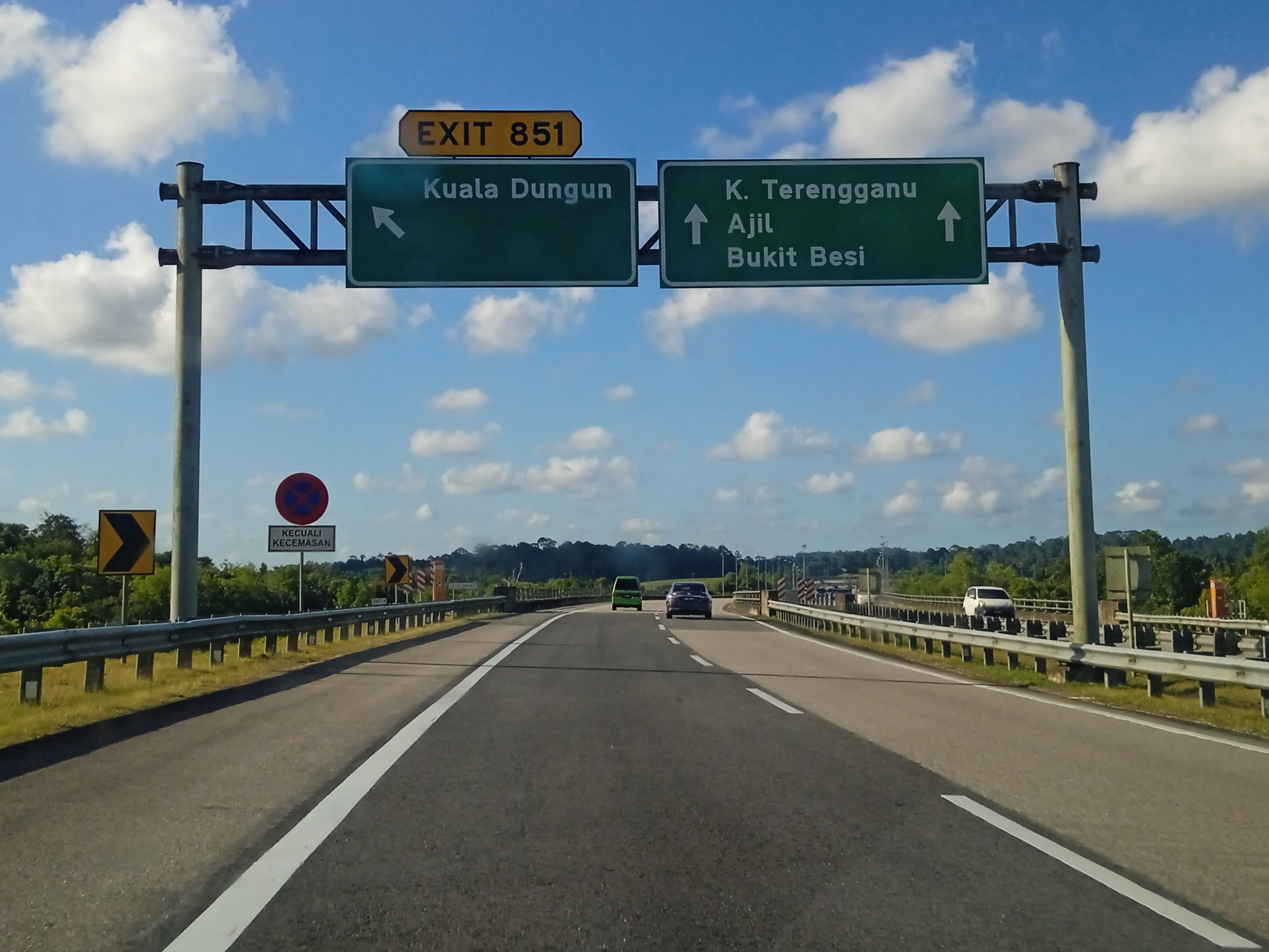
Kuala Dungun Interchange

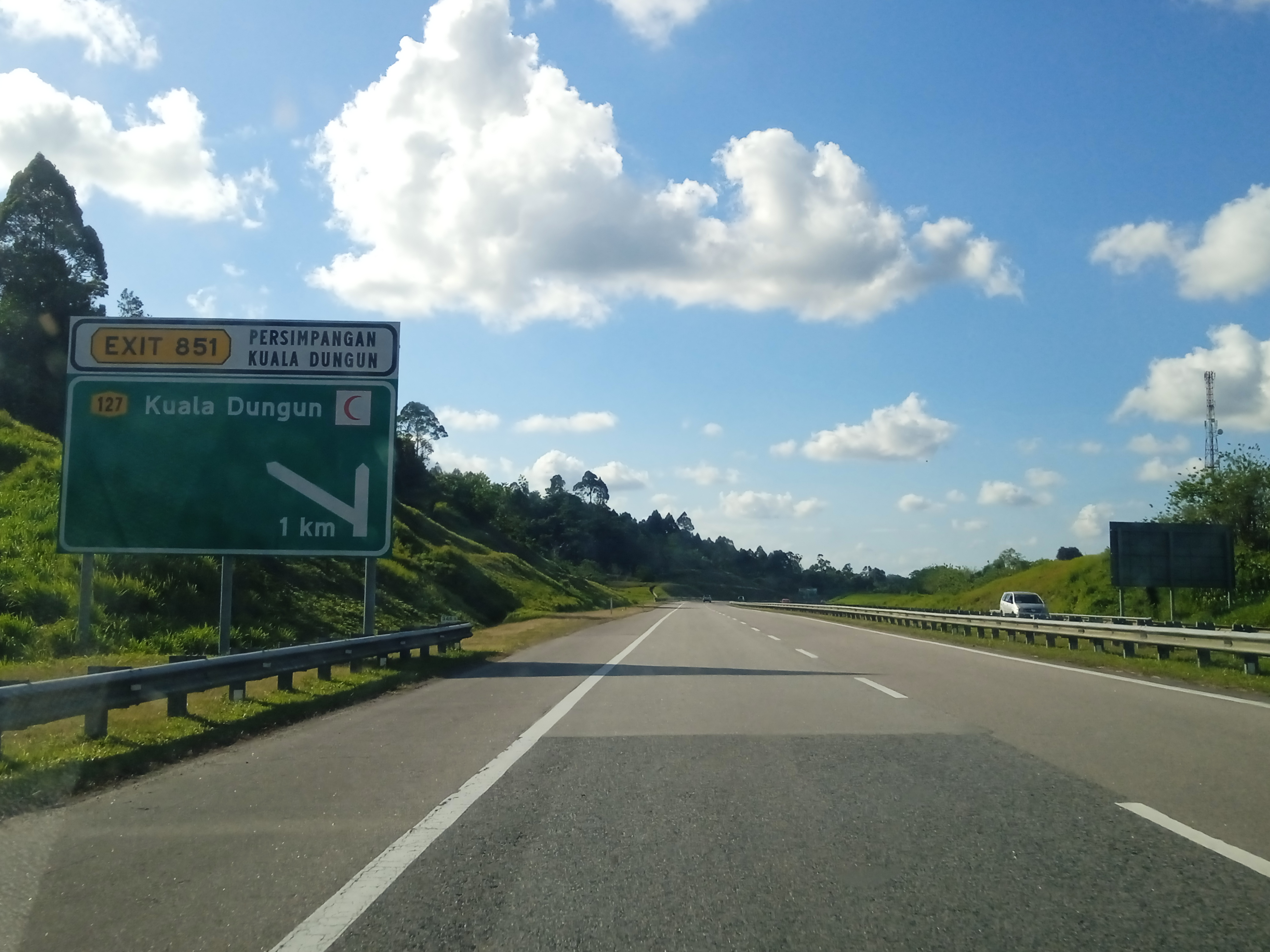
Kuala Dungun exit

Kuala Dungun is accessible via the East Coast Expressway (ECE), which runs from Gombak near Kuala Lumpur in the west to Kuala Terengganu in the north. The nearest exit to Kuala Dungun is the Kuala Dungun exit (Exit 851).
