= Tapai (disambiguation) =

Tapai is an Asian fermented food. Tapai may also refer to

- Ernie Tapai (born 1967), Australian football player
- Szabina Tápai (born 1986), Hungarian handball player
- Wakaf Tapai, a town in Malaysia
