= Kemaman River =

River in Terengganu, Malaysia

Coordinates: 4°14′N 103°26′E

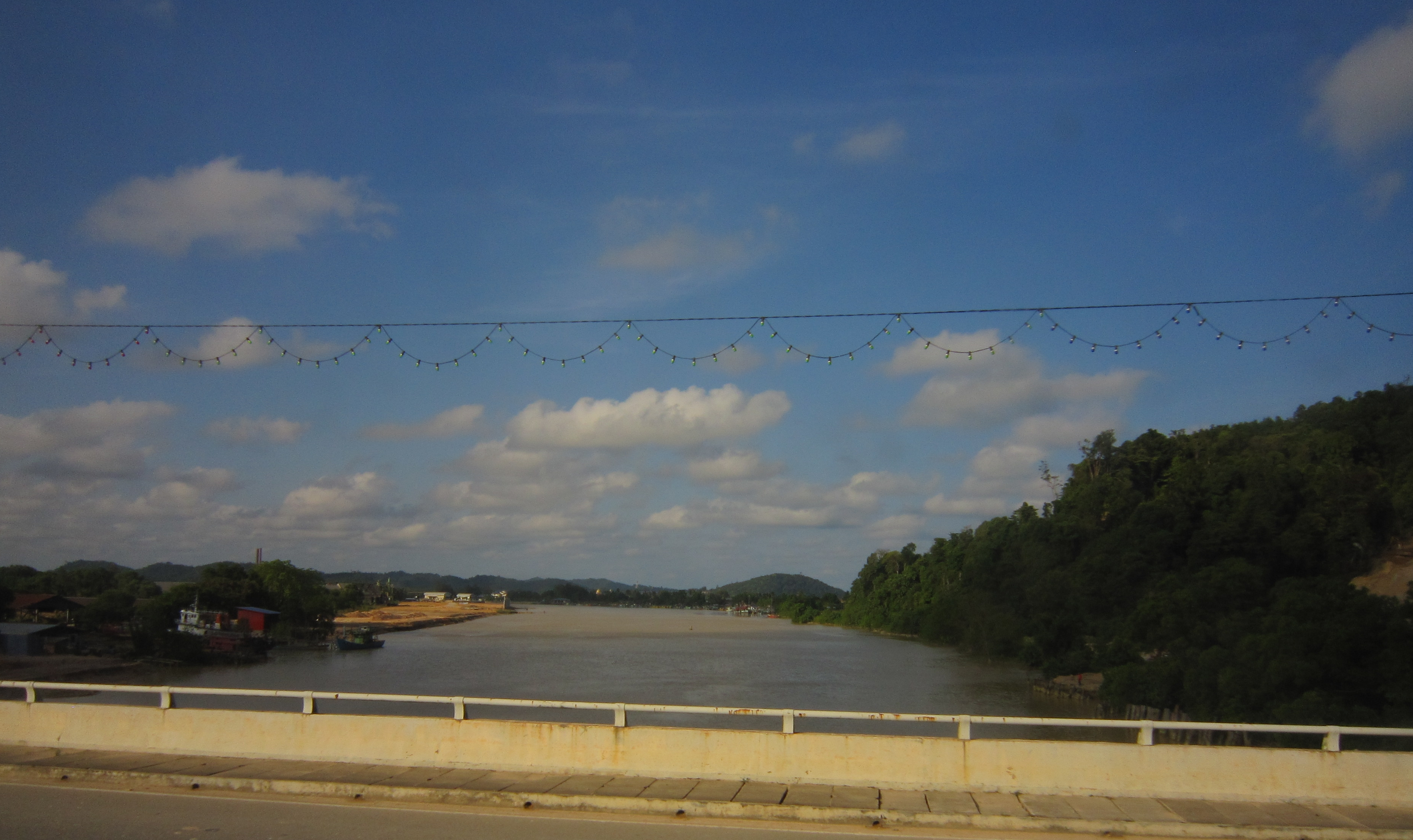
Kemaman River

The Kemaman River (Malay: Sungai Kemaman, Terengganu: Sunga Mmamang) is a river in Terengganu state in Malaysia, flowing in an easterly direction. At 167 km long, it is the longest river in the state and the third longest in East Coast Peninsular Malaysia after Pahang River and Kelantan River. One of the oldest mosques in Malaysia, built in the early 19th century, is in Kampung Tuan, near Chukai, at the mouth of the Kemaman River; the Kemaman served as one of the main transportation routes into the region.

== See also ==
- List of rivers of Malaysia
