= Malaysia Federal Route 124 =

Road in Malaysia

Federal Route 124
- Jalan Jerangau-Jabor (Penghantar 2)

Route information
- Maintained by Malaysian Public Works Department
- Length: 16.05 km (9.97 mi)

Major junctions
- West end: Bandar Sri Bandi
- FT 14 Federal Route 14; East Coast Expressway; T6 Jalan Kijal FT 3 / AH18 Federal Route 3
- East end: Kemasik

Location
- Country: Malaysia
- Primary destinations: Bandar Seri Bandi, Kijal, Kampung Air Jernih

Highway system
- Highways in Malaysia; Expressways; Federal; State

Federal Route 124, or Jalan Jerangau-Jabor (Penghantar 2), is a federal road in Terengganu, Malaysia.

== Features ==
At most sections, the Federal Route 124 was built under the JKR R5 road standard, allowing maximum speed limit of up to 90 km/h.

== Junction lists ==
The entire route is located in Kemaman District, Terengganu.

Legend:

- I/C - Interchange, I/S - Intersection, RSA - Rest and service area, OBR - Overhead bridge restaurant, R/R - Restaurant and rest plaza, L/B - Layby, V/P - Vista point, TN - tunnel, T/P - Toll plaza, BR - Bridge
- C - Cloverleaf, S - Stack, T-A - Trumpet-A, T-B - Trumpet-B, DT - Directional-T/Y, SDT - Semi-Directional-T/Y, P-Y - Partial-Y, D - Diamond, P-C - Partial cloverleaf, D-D - Diverging diamond, D-R - Direct ramp

| Location | km | mi | Name | Destinations | Notes |
|---|---|---|---|---|---|
| Kijal | | | Jerangau–Jabor Highway | FT 14 Malaysia Federal Route 14 – Kuala Terengganu, Bukit Besi, Bandar Al-Muktafi Billah Shah, Bandar Chenih Baharu, Jabur, Kuantan | T-junctions |
| Kijal | | | Bandar Sri Bandi | | |
| Kijal | | | Kijal-ECE | East Coast Expressway – Kuala Terengganu, Dungun, Kerteh, Chukai, Kuantan, Kuala Lumpur | T-junctions |
| Kijal | | | Jalan Kijal | T6 Jalan Kijal – Kijal, Kampung Ibuk, Chukai | T-junctions |
| Kemasik | | | Kampung Air Jernih | | |
| Kemasik | | | Kemasik | FT 3 / AH18 Federal Route 3 – Kuala Terengganu, Paka, Kerteh, Rantau Petronas, Kijal, Chukai, Kuantan | T-junctions |
1.000 mi = 1.609 km; 1.000 km = 0.621 mi
