= Malaysia Federal Route 1689 =

Road in Malaysia

Federal Route 1689
- Jalan Jerangau Barat

Route information
- Maintained by Malaysian Public Works Department

Major junctions
- Northeast end: Kampung Bukit Payung
- FT 14 Federal Route 14
- Southwest end: FELDA Jerangau Barat

Location
- Country: Malaysia

Highway system
- Highways in Malaysia; Expressways; Federal; State

Jalan Jerangau Barat, Federal Route 1689, is a federal road in Terengganu, Malaysia.

At most sections, the Federal Route 1689 was built under the JKR R5 road standard, with a speed limit of up to 90 km/h.

== Junction lists ==
The entire route is located in Hulu Terengganu District, Terengganu.

Legend:

- I/C - Interchange, I/S - Intersection, RSA - Rest and service area, OBR - Overhead bridge restaurant, R/R - Restaurant and rest plaza, L/B - Layby, V/P - Vista point, TN - tunnel, T/P - Toll plaza, BR - Bridge
- C - Cloverleaf, S - Stack, T-A - Trumpet-A, T-B - Trumpet-B, DT - Directional-T/Y, SDT - Semi-Directional-T/Y, P-Y - Partial-Y, D - Diamond, P-C - Partial cloverleaf, D-D - Diverging diamond, D-R - Direct ramp

Location	km	mi	Destinations	Notes
Kampung Bukit Payung			FT 14 Malaysia Federal Route 14 – Kuala Terengganu, Kuala Berang, Ajil, Jerangau, Dungun, Bandar Al-Muktafi Billah Shah, Kuantan	T-junctions
FELDA Jerangau Barat			FELDA Jerangau Barat Welcome Sign	
FELDA Jerangau Barat			Town Centre	
1.000 mi = 1.609 km; 1.000 km = 0.621 mi
