= Wakaf Mempelam =

Village in Terengganu, Malaysia

Wakaf Mempelam (Jawi: واقف ممڤلم, Terengganu Malay: Wakah Ppelang) is a small village and a ward of Kuala Terengganu, Terengganu, Malaysia.
