= Bukit Payong =

Bukit Payong بوكيت ڤايوڠ
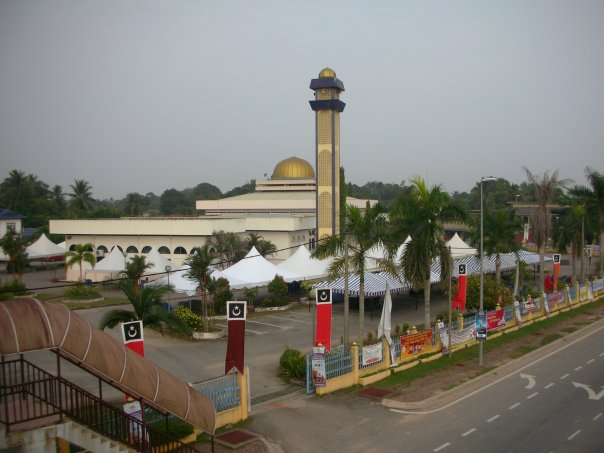
- Bukit Payong Mosque, a landmark at the centre of Bukit Payong

- Flag

- Location in Malaysia
- Coordinates: 4°15′N 103°25′E
- Country: Malaysia
- State: Terengganu
- District: Marang

Population (2010)
  - Total: 26,790
  - Ethnicities: 95.8% Malays; 4% Chinese; 0.15 others
- Time zone: UTC+8 (Malaysian Standard Time)
- Postcode: 21400

Bukit Payong (est. pop. 2010 census: 26790) is a town Marang District, Terengganu, Malaysia.

The population comprises 95.85% Malays, 4% Chinese and 0.15% of other races. The town borders with the district of Kuala Terengganu. It houses several government departments such as Jabatan Pertanian, Jabatan Haiwan, Peladang, and Pejabat Pos. There are several shopping centres; Pasaraya Seri Intan, Kedai Wahab and Xiri Mart. There are also many bundle shops in the town as well as facilities such as banks, a futsal hall, police station, civic hall, clinics, health centres and schools. The East Coast Expressway interchange also exits here. It is also the seat of the state constituency of the same name. Currently, the seat is held by Pan-Malaysian Islamic Party or PAS after 2013 Malaysia General Election

== Gallery ==
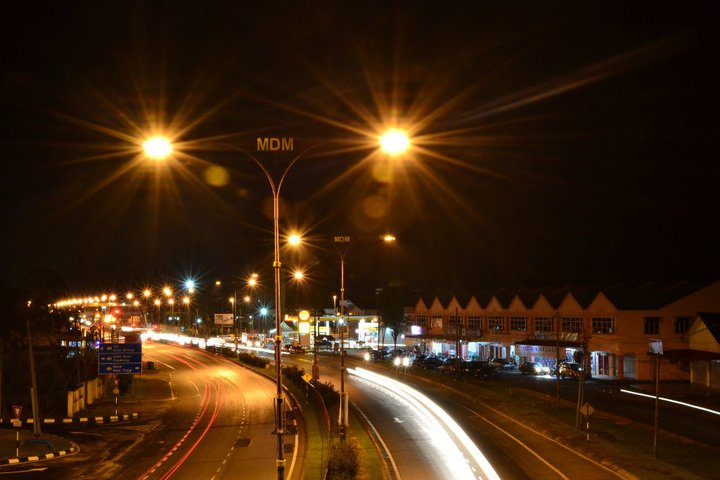
Bukit Payong at night
