= Pasir Raja =

Mukim in Dungun, Terengganu, Malaysia

Pasir Raja in Dungun District

Pasir Raja (Jawi: ڤاسير راج) is a mukim in Dungun District, Terengganu, Malaysia. Located about 40 km from Bandar Al-Muktafi Billah Shah.

== Tourist attractions nearest area ==
- Cemerong waterfall (Jongok Batu)
- Lubuk Kain waterfall (Kampung Shukor) The Lubuk Kain waterfall in Kampung Shukor is a must-see destination, just a short 10-minute drive from Kampung Pasir Raja. This renowned waterfall is celebrated for its pristine and crystal-clear waters, which are a true wonder of nature.
- Bumbung Raja Campsite (Pasir Raja)
