= Bandar Al-Muktafi Billah Shah =

Town in Terengganu, Malaysia

Coordinates: 4°37′N 103°13′E

Bandar Al-Muktafi Billah Shah (Jawi: بندر المكتفي بالله شاه) is a new town in Dungun, Terengganu, Malaysia. It was erected in honour of the 16th Sultan of Terengganu, Almarhum Sultan Mahmud Al-Muktafi Billah Shah.

== Facilities ==
- Masjid Sultan Mahmud Al-Muktafi Billah Shah
- Lembaga Kemajuan Terengganu Tengah (Central Terengganu Development Authority) (KETENGAH) main headquarters
- Bandar Al-Muktafi Billah Shah Restaurant and Rest Plaza (R//R) at Jerangau Highway (Federal Route 14).

== Educations ==
- Sekolah Kebangsaan Durian Mas 1 Bandar Al-Muktafi Billah Shah
- Sekolah Kebangsaan Durian Mas 2 Bandar Al-Muktafi Billah Shah
- Sekolah Menengah Kebangsaan Durian Mas Bandar Al-Muktafi Billah Shah
- Sekolah Menengah Islam Darul Iman Dungun
- Kolej Ketengah
