= Wakaf Tapai =

Coordinates: 5°08′N 103°06′E

Wakaf Tapai (Jawi: واقف تاڤاي, est. pop. (2000 census): 899) is a small town in Marang District, Terengganu, Malaysia.

The population comprises 89% Malays, 10% Chinese and 1% of other races. The town is well known for the Malay rice dish, nasi dagang. The town is so named from the Malay words wakaf, meaning small hut for travelers resting, and tapai, a type of food made from tapioca which tastes like wine.
