= AH141 =

Road in Asia

Asian Highway 141

Route information
- Length: 272.3 km (169.2 mi)

Major junctions
- West end: Port Klang, Selangor
- East end: Gebeng, Pahang

Location
- Countries: Malaysia

Highway system
- Asian Highway Network
← AH140	→ AH142

Asian Highway 141 is a highway that is part of Asian Highway Network. It was never signposted in Malaysia, although it is part of Asian Highway Network. It consists of New North Klang Straits Bypass, New Klang Valley Expressway, Duta–Ulu Klang Expressway (Jalan Duta–Sentul Pasar and Sentul Pasar–Greenwood), FT28 Kuala Lumpur Middle Ring Road 2 (Greenwood–Gombak North Interchange), Kuala Lumpur–Karak Expressway, East Coast Expressway (Karak–Jabur) and FT101 Gebeng Bypass.
