= East Coast Expressway =

Turnpike in Malaysia

Expressway 8
- East Coast Expressway; Lebuhraya Pantai Timur 东海岸大道 لبوهرایا ڤنتاي تيمور

Route information
- Part of AH141 (Karak–Jabur)
- Maintained by ANIH Berhad (Karak–Jabur) and Lebuhraya Pantai Timur 2 Sdn Bhd (Jabur–Kuala Nerus)
- Length: 433 km (269 mi)
- Existed: 2001–present
- History: Karak–Jabur completed in 2004, Jabur–Kuala Nerus completed in 2015.

Major junctions
- Southwest end: Kuala Lumpur–Karak Expressway at Karak, Pahang
- FT 2 Jalan Kuantan–Kuala Lumpur; FT 236 Jalan Lanchang; FT 98 Federal Route 98; FT 83 Jalan Bandar Pusat Jengka; FT 222 MEC Highway; FT 231 Jalan Sungai Lembing FT 101 (Gebeng Bypass) / AH141; FT 422 Federal Route 422; FT 14 Federal Route 14; FT 237 Federal Route 237; FT 124 Federal Route 124; FT 122 Ketengah Highway; FT 132 Bukit Besi Highway; FT 106 Federal Route 106
- Northeast end: FT 3 Federal Route 3 at Kuala Nerus, Terengganu

Location
- Country: Malaysia
- Primary destinations: Kuala Lumpur, Gombak, Genting Highlands, Bentong, Karak, Temerloh, Maran, Kuantan, Kemaman, Bukit Besi, Marang, Ajil, Kuala Terengganu

Highway system
- Highways in Malaysia; Expressways; Federal; State

The East Coast Expressway (ECE; Malay: Lebuhraya Pantai Timur; Chinese: 东海岸大道; Jawi: لبوهرایا ڤنتاي تيمور, LPT) is an interstate controlled-access highway running parallel to the northeastern coast of Peninsular Malaysia. The currently operational 433-kilometre (269-mile) segment of the expressway runs through Karak, Pahang and Kuala Nerus, Terengganu.

The East Coast Expressway serves as the high-speed alternative to the existing federal routes 2 and 3, which it parallels.

== Route background ==
The East Coast Expressway begins from the eastern end of the Kuala Lumpur–Karak Expressway at Karak, Pahang, then runs through Lanchang, Mentakab, Temerloh, Chenor, Maran, Sri Jaya, Gambang, Kuantan, Jabur, Cheneh, Chukai, Kijal, Kerteh, Paka, Dungun, Bukit Besi, Ajil and Telemong, ending in Kampung Gemuruh near Kuala Nerus in Terengganu.

This is the second longest expressway in Peninsular Malaysia, after the North-South Expressway Northern Route.

== History ==
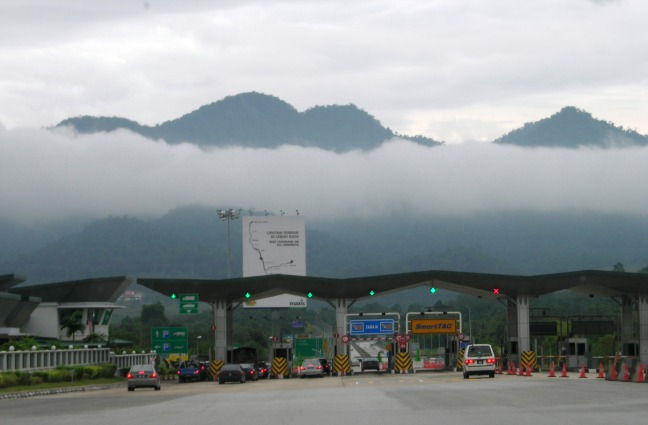
The Karak Toll Plaza on the East Coast Expressway towards Titiwangsa Range, Pahang.

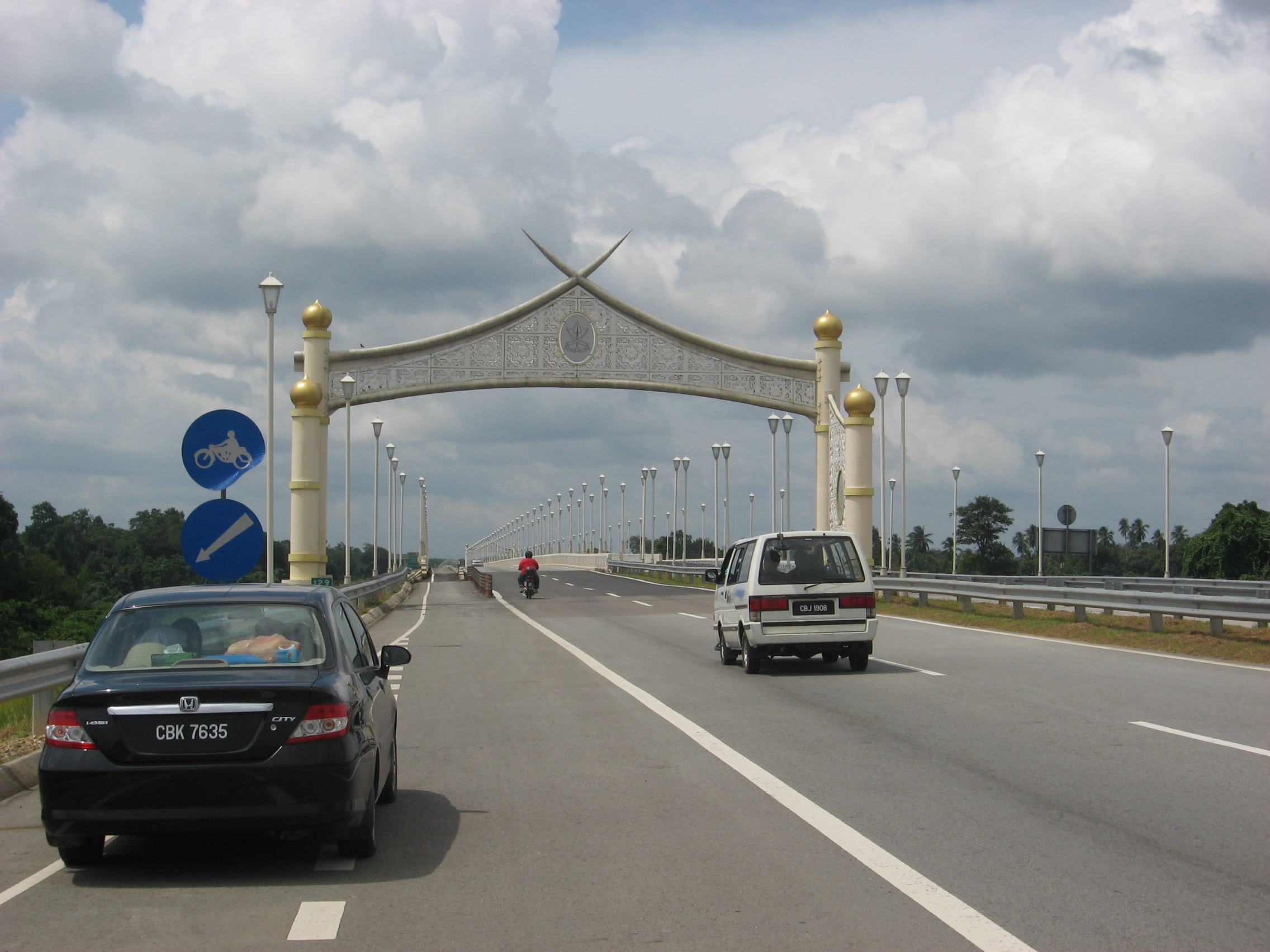
The Sultan Ahmad Shah II Bridge (Semantan Bridge) crosses the Pahang River.

=== Early development (1994–2001) ===
The construction of an expressway from Karak to Kuala Terengganu was first announced in 1994 at the time when the Kuala Lumpur–Karak Expressway was being upgraded from the former 2-lane highway to a full expressway. At that time, the original concessionaire company of the expressway project was a consortium company formed by MMC Corporation Berhad (through its subsidiary, Projek Lebuhraya Timur Sdn. Bhd. (Pelita)), MTD Group and Malaysian Resource Corporation Berhad (MRCB). The 338-km expressway was planned as a different route than the Kuala Lumpur–Karak Expressway even though the former would begin at the end point of the latter. At that time, the estimated construction cost of the expressway was RM4.6 billion before being reduced to RM4.26 billion for the entire section from Karak to Kuala Terengganu. Due to the very high cost, MTD Group and MRCB withdrew from the consortium, leaving Pelita to do the job alone. The concession contract between Pelita and the government was signed on 9 September 1998; however, there was no sign of any construction works by the original concessionaire due to the effects of the 1997 Asian financial crisis, hence nullifying the former concession agreement.

The first delay of the project became a controversial issue nationwide. The Prime Minister at that time, Tun Dr. Mahathir Mohamad, announced that all expressway projects at that time to be postponed, claiming that Malaysians were not ready to pay tolls to enjoy higher-quality highways. After the state governments of Pahang, Terengganu and Johor pleaded to the federal government not to delay the expressway projects, the federal government agreed to go on with the East Coast Expressway project.

=== Phase 1 (Karak–Jabor, 2001–2004) ===
In order to resume the expressway project, the federal government decided to fund the expressway project themselves and once again approached MTD Group as the new concessionaire company for the East Coast Expressway. A letter of intention was sent by the federal government to MTD Group on 1 March 2000, and the new concession contract was signed on 17 January 2001. MTD Group was chosen as the new concessionaire company for being able to offer the lowest construction cost for the expressway project. The construction of the East Coast Expressway began in October 2000 through MTD Capital Sdn Bhd using acquired land costing RM29.2 billion.

However, the construction of the expressway was only limited to the first phase from Karak to Kuantan, as the new state government of Terengganu led by Pan-Malaysian Islamic Party (PAS) who took over the state from Barisan Nasional during the 1999 General Election, strongly opposed the toll collection of the expressway and insisted on building their own version of the East Coast Expressway without toll collection. The abolishment of toll collection in Terengganu became the primary manifesto of PAS during the election. On the other hand, the Minister of Works at that time, Datuk Seri Samy Vellu insisted that toll collection was needed, claiming that the federal government could not afford to fully fund the East Coast Expressway without toll collection. In the end, the construction of the Terengganu section by PAS state government ultimately did not materialise at all.

The East Coast Expressway Phase 1 from Karak to Kuantan was opened to motorists on 1 August 2004, with the total cost of RM1.3 billion, which was translated to RM7.5 million per kilometre. The expressway was gazetted with the route number of E8, as a continuation of the Kuala Lumpur–Karak Expressway E8/FT2. The second part of Phase 1, the Sri Jaya and Jabur was opened in July 2007.

=== Phase 2 (Jabor–Kuala Terengganu, 2003–2015) ===
The East Coast Expressway Phase 2 extends the expressway to Kuala Terengganu, serving as the alternative for both Federal Route 3 and Jerangau–Jabor Highway FT14. The construction of the second phase of the East Coast Expressway E8 began in 2006 as a result of the Barisan Nasional takeover of Terengganu state government from PAS during the 2004 general election. Unlike the first phase of the expressway where MTD Group became the only contractor (and concessionaire company), MTD was only allocated about 30% of the construction job for the second phase, from Bukit Besi to Telemung (Package 10), with the total length of 64 km. The remaining 70% of the construction job was awarded to Bumiputra contractors, where 30% of the construction job was allocated to Terengganuan contractors and the remainder was allocated to non-Terengganuan contractors. As a result, the section built by MTD Group was monitored by the Malaysian Highway Authority (LLM), while the remaining section was monitored by the Malaysian Public Works Department (JKR).

Unlike the first phase of the expressway where MTD Group managed to complete it on time despite the huge flood in Pahang during the construction period, the second phase of the expressway had sparked a controversy due to numerous delays during the construction. The deadline was set for May 2011; however, the final deadline of the project completion was pushed to September 2014. The price hike of construction materials such as bitumen and steel was primarily blamed for the delay, as the price hike had caused several contractors to withdraw from the project due to their inability to afford the increasing construction costs. In addition, the Malaysian Public Accounts Committee (PAC) also claimed that the delay and the increase of construction costs was attributed to the change of the construction model from being a toll-free federal highway to a toll expressway. Meanwhile, MTD Group claimed that the huge flood in Terengganu in 2009 that submerged some sections of the expressway had forced them to redesign the expressway, including the construction of higher viaducts in flood-prone areas, adding the construction costs further.

On 7 April 2011, MTD Group's toll road divisions, MTD Prime Sdn. Bhd. and Metramac Corporation Sdn. Bhd., were spun off to form ANIH Berhad after taking over the operations of Toll Concession from the concessionaire companies who respectively owned the concessions for Kuala Lumpur–Karak Expressway, East Coast Expressway Phase 1, and Kuala Lumpur–Seremban Expressway (including East–West Link Expressway), with effect from 6 December 2011.

The second phase of the East Coast Expressway was opened in stages. The sections from Telemung to Kuala Terengganu and Ajil–Bukit Besi were the earliest sections being opened to motorists on 22 August 2011, followed by Ajil–Telemung section on 18 May 2012, Bukit Besi–Paka section on 25 January 2014, and Jabor–Cheneh section on 22 July 2014. When completed, the East Coast Expressway E8 Phase 2 will become a toll expressway that enjoys the longest toll-free period in Malaysia for 3 years.

On 31 January 2015, all sections of the Jabur–Kuala Terengganu of the East Coast Expressway has now opened to traffic. During toll free period at ECE2 (Terengganu section), motorists coming from Kuala Lumpur must exit the expressway at Jabor interchange, make a U-turn after paying toll and collect a transit card at Jabor toll plaza, which will be returned at the Jabor temporary toll plaza, in order to proceed to Kuala Terengganu. On the other hand, the ticket from the Jabor temporary toll plaza can be used within the entire length of the ECE1 E8. On 20 April 2015, it was announced that PLUS Malaysia Berhad, the operator of the North–South Expressway, will be operating the second phase of the East Coast Expressway E8 starting from August 2015, making the East Coast Expressway E8 as the first expressway route in Malaysia to be operated by two different concessionaire. The toll rate of the second phase of the expressway will be pegged to the rate of the first phase. On 7 July 2015, the Jabor temporary toll plaza was demolished to make way for the non-stop toll operation along the ECE2 E8 to avoid congestion caused by the temporary toll plaza. The operation of the toll plazas along the ECE2 E8 is conducted temporarily by Malaysian Highway Authority (LLM) themselves before being handed to PLUS Malaysia Berhad in August 2015.

=== Major events ===
- 14 December 2007 and 4 January 2021 – The East Coast Expressway section from Karak to Lanchang was flooded.
- 17 September 2009 – Motorists using the Kuala Lumpur–Karak Expressway and the East Coast Expressway can drive toll free on 18 and 24 September from midnight to 5am during Hari Raya Aidilfitri.
- 2 September 2010 – The Kuala Lumpur–Karak Expressway and the East Coast Expressway become toll-free from 9pm till 6am on 7, 8, 15 and 16 September during Hari Raya Aidilfitri holidays.
- 23 December 2014 – The Temerloh–Chenor section of the East Coast Expressway was flooded.
- 3 January 2021 – The Sri Jaya–Gambang section of the East Coast Expressway was flooded.

== Sections ==
=== Phase 1 (Pahang): Karak–Jabur ===
The length of this segment is 174 km (108 mi) and runs from Kuala Lumpur–Karak Expressway through Lanchang, Mentakab, Temerloh, Chenor, Maran, Kuantan and ends at the Pahang–Terengganu border near Jabur. The turnkey contract was awarded to MTD Capital.

Administratively, the Gombak–Karak stretch is part of LPT Phase 1, being managed by the same concessionaire and sharing the same route number, E8. The Gombak–Karak stretch also forms part of Highway 2.

Though the expressway begins in Gombak, the zeroth kilometer is not there; instead it is located at the intersection of Jalan Pahang (part of Highway 2) and Jalan Tun Razak, near the Kuala Lumpur Hospital, and counted along Jalan Pahang and Jalan Gombak. The Gombak toll plaza is located at the 19th kilometer, close to the International Islamic University Malaysia. The Karak Expressway is almost parallel to the old Gombak–Bentong road 68, crossing some villages in the Gombak constituency, before crossing the Selangor–Pahang border at the Genting Sempah Tunnel. Exits to Genting Highlands are built at both ends of the tunnel. There is a rest stop with a McDonald's outlet just after the eastern end of the tunnel.

The ECE continues its parallel arrangement with Route 68 until the Bentong West toll plaza, where Route 68 veers towards north, merging into Highway 8 in Bentong town. The Karak Expressway continues for another 50 km until the Karak toll plaza, where it ceases to be concurrent with Highway 2. Highway 9 also begins near there, connecting Karak all the way to Kuala Pilah and Tampin in Negeri Sembilan.

While the Gombak–Karak stretch uses an open toll collection system, with toll plazas at Gombak and Bentong, the Karak toll plaza is the beginning of the closed access system. Motorists are required to sign-in using Touch 'n Go cards or SmartTAG (transit tickets for cash transactions are no longer accepted starting August 2017). Motorists which leave the expressway sign out at the desired toll plaza and will be charged according to distance and type of vehicle.

Just after the Temerloh exit, spanning the Pahang River is a bridge, designed with elephant tusk motifs, in a nod to the emblem of Pahang. The expressway continues to Maran, Gambang and then the state capital Kuantan. The Sungai Lembing road 231 connects Exit 833 of the expressway to downtown Kuantan. Further north, just after crossing the border into Terengganu, there is the Gebeng Bypass 101 which serves as a shortcut to Kuantan Port. The first phase of the expressway ends at Jabur, at the Pahang–Terengganu border, which also serves as the Limit of Maintenance Responsibility for ANIH Berhad. Beyond Jabor, PLUS takes over.

=== Phase 2 (Terengganu): Jabur–Kuala Nerus ===
Fully operational by January 2015, the second phase of the ECE begins in Jabur, crossing Cheneh, Chukai, Kijal, Kerteh, Paka, Dungun, Bukit Besi, Ajil, and Telemong before terminating at an interchange with Highway 3 at Kampung Gemuruh near Kuala Terengganu. The Jabor–Kuala Terengganu stretch is operated by PLUS, which also operates the North–South Expressway, as opposed to the Gombak–Jabor stretch, which is the responsibility of ANIH Berhad. Despite the different concessionaires, the Jabor–Kuala Terengganu stretch is administratively the same expressway as the Gombak–Jabor stretch, having the same route number, E8.

LPT2 is almost parallel to Highway 14, save for the stretch between Kijal and Bukit Besi, where the expressway veered closer to the coast. Since opening, LPT2 has seen a number of fatal accidents, and a case involving a pregnant female tiger. The spate of accidents had prompted certain quarters to allege that LPT2 had uneven roads, putting motorists at risk.

For the first few months in operation, motorists had to sign out at the Jabor toll plaza to pay the toll fare up until Jabor, before making a loop and entering the LPT2. Since July 2015 though, the Malaysian Highway Authority had taken responsibility for toll collection of LPT2 until the concession agreement was finalised. Following this, motorists are no longer required to sign out at Jabor, and they can pay the toll fare at the LPT2 toll plazas. Pending the finalization of the concession agreement, the toll fare was calculated until Jabor for the time being, effectively making the Jabor–Kuala Terengganu stretch free of charge. The concession agreement was signed with PLUS in April 2016, and Lebuhraya Pantai Timur 2 Sdn. Bhd., a subsidiary of PLUS, was reportedly appointed to manage the highway. The Terengganu state government had reportedly requested that toll collection be postponed until after the 2016 Hari Raya celebrations in July 2016. Toll collections by LPT2 Sdn. Bhd. formally began on 15 July, when the new toll rates were announced. For example, a trip from Gombak to Kuala Terengganu now costs RM 52.80.

== Future sections ==
=== Phase 3 (Kelantan): Kuala Nerus–Kota Bharu ===
Phase 3 will connect from Kampung Gemuruh (near Kuala Terengganu) to Kota Bharu and Tumpat, just before the border with Thailand. Phase 3 will cover 124 kilometers. Two routes, one taking the coastal route and the other passing through Gua Musang constituency in southern Kelantan will be explored. The project had been included in the Eleventh Malaysia Plan (Rancangan Malaysia Ke-11, RMK 11).

=== Phase 4 (Pahang and Johor): Gambang–Johor Bahru ===
Phase 4 will connect from Gambang to Johor Bahru via Malaysia Federal Route 3. Phase 4 will cover 250 kilometers. The construction of this section has not started yet for various reasons.

== Safety ==
Since it was opened to traffic on 2015, many traffic accidents have occurred along this segment of this expressway. The majority of accidents and fatalities on the new stretches of the expressway was attributed to reckless or exhausted drivers, trespassing animals and damaged and water-logged roads.

== Tolls ==
Unlike the Kuala Lumpur–Karak Highway of E8 section, East Coast Expressway uses closed toll system with barriers where tolls are built on most of their access points and rates are calculated based on distance travelled between the entry and exit point. The current terminus of this system lies on Karak toll plaza westbound and Kuala Terengganu eastbound. Although the two section has different operators, both has their toll collection integrated between each other.

Rates below is for furthest possible journey along the current closed toll system between Karak and Kuala Terengganu.

Class	Type of vehicles	Rate (in Malaysian Ringgit (RM))
0	Motorcycles, bicycles or vehicles with 2 or less wheels	Free
1	Vehicles with 2 axles and 3 or 4 wheels excluding taxis	RM 43.27
2	Vehicles with 2 axles and 5 or 6 wheels excluding buses	RM 86.54
3	Vehicles with 3 or more axles	RM 129.82
4	Taxis	RM 21.64
5	Buses	RM 43.27

== Junction lists ==
The entire expressway was built as a 4-lane divided expressway with two lanes for each carriageways. The speed limit for the entire expressway is 110 km/h except at Exit 813B Karak Interchange (90 km/h) and Karak Toll Plaza (60 km/h).

Legend:

- I/C - Interchange, I/S - Intersection, RSA - Rest and service area, OBR - Overhead bridge restaurant, R/R - Restaurant and rest plaza, L/B - Layby, V/P - Vista point, TN - tunnel, T/P - Toll plaza, BR - Bridge
- C - Cloverleaf, S - Stack, T-A - Trumpet-A, T-B - Trumpet-B, DT - Directional-T/Y, SDT - Semi-Directional-T/Y, P-Y - Partial-Y, D - Diamond, P-C - Partial cloverleaf, D-D - Diverging diamond, D-R - Direct ramp

State	District	Location	km	mi	Exit	Name	Destinations	Notes
Pahang	Bentong	Karak			Through to Kuala Lumpur–Karak Expressway / AH141			
Pahang	Bentong	Karak			Sungai Bentong bridge			
Pahang	Bentong	Karak	77.8	48.3	813B	Karak I/C	FT 2 Jalan Kuantan–Kuala Lumpur – Karak, Manchis, Kuala Pilah; FT 1498 Jalan Utama Mempaga – FELDA Mempaga	Western terminus of concurrency with AH141
Pahang	Bentong	Karak			Karak Toll Plaza			
Pahang	Bentong	Karak			Sungai Kelau bridge			
Pahang	Temerloh	Lanchang	89.9	55.9	Lanchang L/B (eastbound)			
Pahang	Temerloh	Lanchang	90.1	56.0	Lanchang L/B (westbound)			
Pahang	Temerloh	Lanchang			Sungai Jenalik bridge			
Pahang	Temerloh	Lanchang			Sungai Senut bridge			
Pahang	Temerloh	Lanchang	99.8	62.0	816	Lanchang I/C	FT 236 Jalan Lanchang – Lanchang, FELDA Mempaga, Raub, Kuala Lipis, Kuala Gandah Elephant Conservation Centre	Trumpet interchange
Pahang	Temerloh	Lanchang			Sungai Teris bridge			
Pahang	Temerloh	Temerloh			Railway crossing bridge			
Pahang	Temerloh	Temerloh	126.4	78.5	819	Temerloh I/C	FT 98 Federal Route 98 – Temerloh, Mentakab, Jerantut, Bera, Taman Negara	Trumpet interchange
Pahang	Temerloh	Temerloh				Kampung Tebing Tinggi motorcycle ramps	C121 Jalan Tebing Tinggi – Kampung Tebing Tinggi, Temerloh, Kampung Paya Jejawi, Sanggang	Motorcycles only From / To east only
Pahang	Temerloh	Temerloh			Sungai Pahang bridge Sultan Ahmad Shah II Bridge; Length: 700 m			
Pahang	Temerloh	Temerloh				Kampung Sanggang Seberang motorcycle ramps	C123 Pahang State Route C123 – Kampung Sanggang Seberang, Batu Sawar, Rantau Makmur	Motorcycles only From / To west only
Pahang	Temerloh	Temerloh			Temerloh RSA, Shell petrol station (eastbound)			
Pahang	Temerloh	Temerloh			Temerloh RSA, Shell petrol station (westbound)			
Pahang	Temerloh	Temerloh			JPJ Enforcement Station (eastbound)			
Pahang	Maran	Chenor			Sungai Jengka bridge			
Pahang	Maran	Chenor			821	Chenor I/C	FT 83 Federal Route 83 – Bandar Pusat Jengka, Kampung Awah, Chenor, Universiti Teknologi Mara (UiTM) Kampus Jengka	Trumpet interchange
Pahang	Maran	Maran			Sungai Jempul bridge			
Pahang	Maran	Maran			Maran L/B (westbound)			
Pahang	Maran	Maran			Maran L/B (eastbound)			
Pahang	Maran	Maran			Sungai Maran bridge			
Pahang	Maran	Maran	173.8	108.0	825	Maran I/C	FT 2 Jalan Kuantan-Kuala Lumpur – Maran, Lubuk Paku	Trumpet interchange
Pahang	Maran	Maran			Sungai Luit bridge			
Pahang	Maran	Sri Jaya			827	Sri Jaya I/C	FT 2 Jalan Kuantan-Kuala Lumpur – Sri Jaya, Belimbing, Tasik Chini	Trumpet interchange
Pahang	Kuantan	Gambang			JPJ Enforcement Station (westbound)			
Pahang	Kuantan	Gambang			Gambang RSA, Petronas petrol station (westbound)			
Pahang	Kuantan	Gambang			Gambang RSA, Petronas petrol station (eastbound)			
Pahang	Kuantan	Gambang			Sungai Lepar bridge			
Pahang	Kuantan	Gambang			Sungai Bakapor bridge			
Pahang	Kuantan	Gambang			Sungai Berkelah bridge			
Pahang	Kuantan	Gambang			Sungai Pohoi bridge			
Pahang	Kuantan	Gambang			Sungai Belat bridge			
Pahang	Kuantan	Gambang			830	Gambang I/C	FT 222 (Malaysia Federal Route 222) / AH142 – Gambang, Segamat, Pekan, Muadzam Shah, Johor Bahru, Universiti Malaysia Pahang al-Sultan Abdullah (UMPSA) Sekolah Sukan Malaysia Pahang Sultan Ahmad Shah Islamic University of Pahang (UnIPSAS)	Trumpet interchange
Pahang	Kuantan	Gambang				Gambang East I/C	East Coast Expressway (Phase 4) – Johor Bahru, Mersing, Rompin, Pekan, Pulau Tioman, Endau-Rompin National Park	Planned
Pahang	Kuantan	Kuantan			Sungai Padan bridge			
Pahang	Kuantan	Kuantan			Kuantan L/B (westbound)			
Pahang	Kuantan	Kuantan			Kuantan L/B (eastbound)			
Pahang	Kuantan	Kuantan			JPJ Enforcement Station (eastbound)			
Pahang	Kuantan	Kuantan			Sungai Kuantan bridge			
Pahang	Kuantan	Kuantan			Sungai Mabok bridge			
Pahang	Kuantan	Kuantan	238.4	148.1	833	Kuantan I/C	FT 231 Federal Route 231 – Kuantan, Bandar Indera Mahkota, Sungai Lembing, Sultan Haji Ahmad Shah Airport, International Islamic University Malaysia Kuantan Campus	Trumpet interchange
Terengganu	Kemaman	Jabur			836	Jabor I/C	FT 101 (Gebeng Bypass) / AH141 – Jabur, Gebeng, Kuantan Port, Cherating, Beserah	Eastern terminus of concurrency with AH141; Trumpet interchange
Terengganu	Kemaman	Jabur			Sungai Perasing bridge			
Terengganu	Kemaman	Jabur			Jabur viaduct Sungai Jabur bridge			
Terengganu	Kemaman	Jabur			Perasing RSA, Shell petrol station Accessible to both directions via a directional-T interchange			
Terengganu	Kemaman	Jabur			837	Pelabuhan Kuantan I/C	FT 422 Federal Route 422 – Gebeng Bypass, Gebeng, Kuantan Port, Kuantan	Not open yet Trumpet interchange
Terengganu	Kemaman	Cheneh			839	Cheneh I/C	FT 14 Jerangau–Jabor Highway – Bandar Chenih Baharu, Bandar Cerul	Trumpet interchange
Terengganu	Kemaman	Cheneh			Sungai Cerul bridge			
Terengganu	Kemaman	Cheneh			Paluh Jenang viaduct Sungai Paluh Jenang bridge			
Terengganu	Kemaman	Chukai			Kemaman viaduct Sungai Kemaman bridge			
Terengganu	Kemaman	Chukai			Pinang viaduct Sungai Pinang bridge			
Terengganu	Kemaman	Chukai			841	Chukai I/C	FT 237 Federal Route 237 – Chukai, Air Putih	Trumpet interchange
Terengganu	Kemaman	Kijal			Sungai Bungkus bridge			
Terengganu	Kemaman	Kijal			Kijal L/B, Petron petrol station (northbound)			
Terengganu	Kemaman	Kijal			Kijal L/B, Petron petrol station (southbound)			
Terengganu	Kemaman	Kijal			JPJ Enforcement Station (Southbound)			
Terengganu	Kemaman	Kijal			Sungai Ibuk bridge			
Terengganu	Kemaman	Kijal	305.4	189.8	845	Kijal I/C	FT 124 Federal Route 124 – Bandar Sri Bandi, Kijal, Kemasik, Kemaman Port, Terengganu Advance Technical Institute University College (TATI UC)	Trumpet interchange
Terengganu	Kemaman	Kerteh			Sungai Cabang bridge			
Terengganu	Kemaman	Kerteh	318.8	198.1	847	Kerteh I/C	T129 Jalan Nyior Cabang – Kemasik, Kerteh, Kerteh Airport	Trumpet interchange
Terengganu	Kemaman	Kerteh			Sungai Kerteh bridge			
Terengganu	Dungun	Paka			JPJ Enforcement Station (northbound)			
Terengganu	Dungun	Paka	332.0	206.3	849	Paka I/C	FT 122 Federal Route 122 – Paka, Bandar Ketengah Jaya, Bandar Al-Muktafi Billah Shah, Pasir Raja	Trumpet interchange
Terengganu	Dungun	Paka			Paka RSA, Shell petrol station (northbound)			
Terengganu	Dungun	Paka			Paka RSA, Shell petrol station (southbound)			
Terengganu	Dungun	Paka			Paka viaduct Sungai Paka bridge			
Terengganu	Dungun	Ketengah			Penyiram viaduct Sungai Penyiram bridge			
Terengganu	Dungun	Ketengah	348.8	216.7	851	Kuala Dungun I/C	T118 Jalan Durian Mentangau – Kuala Dungun, Durian Mentangau, Lubuk Pauh	Trumpet interchange
Terengganu	Dungun	Ketengah			Sungai Uma bridge			
Terengganu	Dungun	Ketengah			Viaduct			
Terengganu	Dungun	Ketengah			Sungai Celir bridge			
Terengganu	Dungun	Ketengah			Kampung Pinang Mas viaduct			
Terengganu	Dungun	Ketengah			Sungai Luit bridge			
Terengganu	Dungun	Bukit Besi	365.5	227.1	853	Bukit Besi I/C	FT 132 Federal Route 132 – Bukit Besi, Bandar Al-Muktafi Billah Shah, Jerangau, Rantau Abang	Trumpet interchange
Terengganu	Dungun	Bukit Besi			Sungai Dungun bridge			
Terengganu	Dungun	Bukit Besi			Bukit Besi L/B (northbound)			
Terengganu	Dungun	Bukit Besi			Bukit Besi L/B (southbound)			
Terengganu	Hulu Terengganu	Ajil			JPJ Enforcement Station (southbound)			
Terengganu	Hulu Terengganu	Ajil	403.7	250.8	858	Ajil I/C	FT 106 Jalan Ajil-Kuala Berang – Ajil, Wakaf Tapai, Kuala Berang, Jerangau, Kenyir Lake (Jetty)	Trumpet interchange
Terengganu	Hulu Terengganu	Ajil			Sungai Terengganu bridge			
Terengganu	Hulu Terengganu	Ajil			Ajil RSA (southbound)			
Terengganu	Hulu Terengganu	Ajil			Ajil RSA (northbound)			
Terengganu	Hulu Terengganu	Telemong			Sungai Telemong bridge			
Terengganu	Hulu Terengganu	Telemong	423.2	263.0	862	Telemong I/C	FT 250 Bukit Payung–Telemung Highway – Kuala Jeneris, Gua Musang, Kuala Telemong, Bukit Payung, Marang, Kenyir Lake (Jetty), Pulau Kapas (Jetty), Terengganu Skill Development Centre College (Kolej TESDEC)	Trumpet interchange
Terengganu	Kuala Nerus	Kuala Nerus			Viaduct			
Terengganu	Kuala Nerus	Kuala Nerus			Sungai Nerus bridge			
Terengganu	Kuala Nerus	Kuala Nerus	432.8	268.9	865	Kuala Terengganu I/C	FT 3 (Jalan Kuala Terengganu–Kota Bharu) / AH18 – Kota Bharu, Jerteh, Batu Enam, Bandar Permaisuri (setiu), Pulau Redang (Jetty), Pulau Perhentian (Jetty), Kuala Nerus, Kuala Terengganu, Seberang Takir, Sultan Mahmud Airport, Pulau Duyong, Universiti Malaysia Terengganu (UMT), Universiti Sultan Zainal Abidin (UniSZA)	Current terminus of expressways Trumpet interchange
Terengganu	Setiu	Permaisuri				Permaisuri I/C		Planned trumpet interchange
Terengganu	Besut	Jerteh				Jerteh I/C		Planned trumpet interchange
Kelantan	Pasir Puteh	Pasir Puteh				Machang (Pasir Puteh) I/C		Planned trumpet interchange
Kelantan	Kota Bharu	Kota Bharu				Ketereh I/C		Planned trumpet interchange
Kelantan	Kota Bharu	Kota Bharu				Kota Bharu I/C		Planned trumpet interchange
Kelantan	Tumpat	Tumpat				Tumpat I/C		Planned trumpet interchange
1.000 mi = 1.609 km; 1.000 km = 0.621 mi: Concurrency terminus; Electronic toll collection; Incomplete access; Proposed; Unopened

== See also ==
- Malaysian Expressway System
- Kuala Lumpur–Karak Expressway
