= Gebeng =

Town in Pahang, Malaysia

Coordinates: 3°58′N 103°26′E

Gebeng is a small town and main industrial area near Kuantan, Pahang, Malaysia. The town is located near Kuantan Port. The phase 1 of the East Coast Expressway leads to Gebeng.

== Features ==
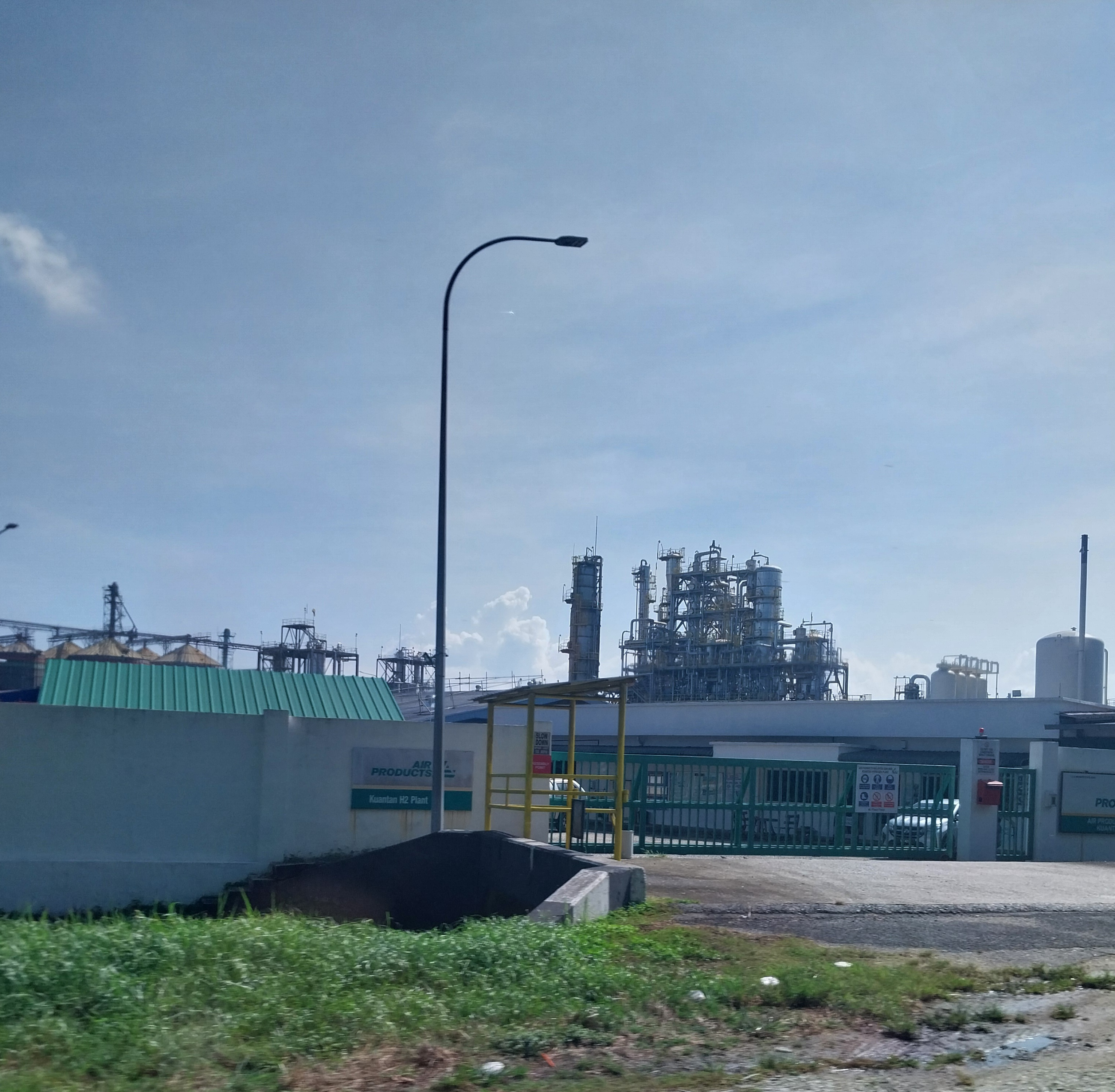
Industrial plant in Gebeng.

The industrial area was developed over two phases since the 1970s.

Phase One is near the main trunk road (Kuantan-Gebeng by-pass, national highway 2) and consisting of small and medium scale industries such as wood processing industries, metal works factories and concrete ducting company. Phase Two was developed in the early 1990s and the majority of industries here are petrochemical companies such as Petronas MTBE-Polypropylene, BP Chemicals, WR Grace, EASTMAN, Kaneka and Cryovac. The third phase currently occupied by Polyplastics Asia Pacific, BASF-Petronas, Petronas CUF, Petronas Centralized Emergency Facilities and PDH Plant.

The Gebeng industrial area is home to the controversial Lynas Advanced Materials Plant.

There are also industrial activities at the Kuantan Port Industrial Area where FPG Oleochemicals (FELDA Procter & Gamble), FELDA palm oil mill, Air Products, Kuantan Flour Mills and several other companies are situated here.

== Administration ==
As with much of Kuantan district, Gebeng is administered by the Kuantan City Council (Majlis Bandaraya Kuantan).

Gebeng Industrial Area was delineated as an autonomous sub-district (daerah kecil) for land revenue purposes in 2020.
