= Jerangau =

Coordinates: 4°49′54.9″N 103°11′46.8″E

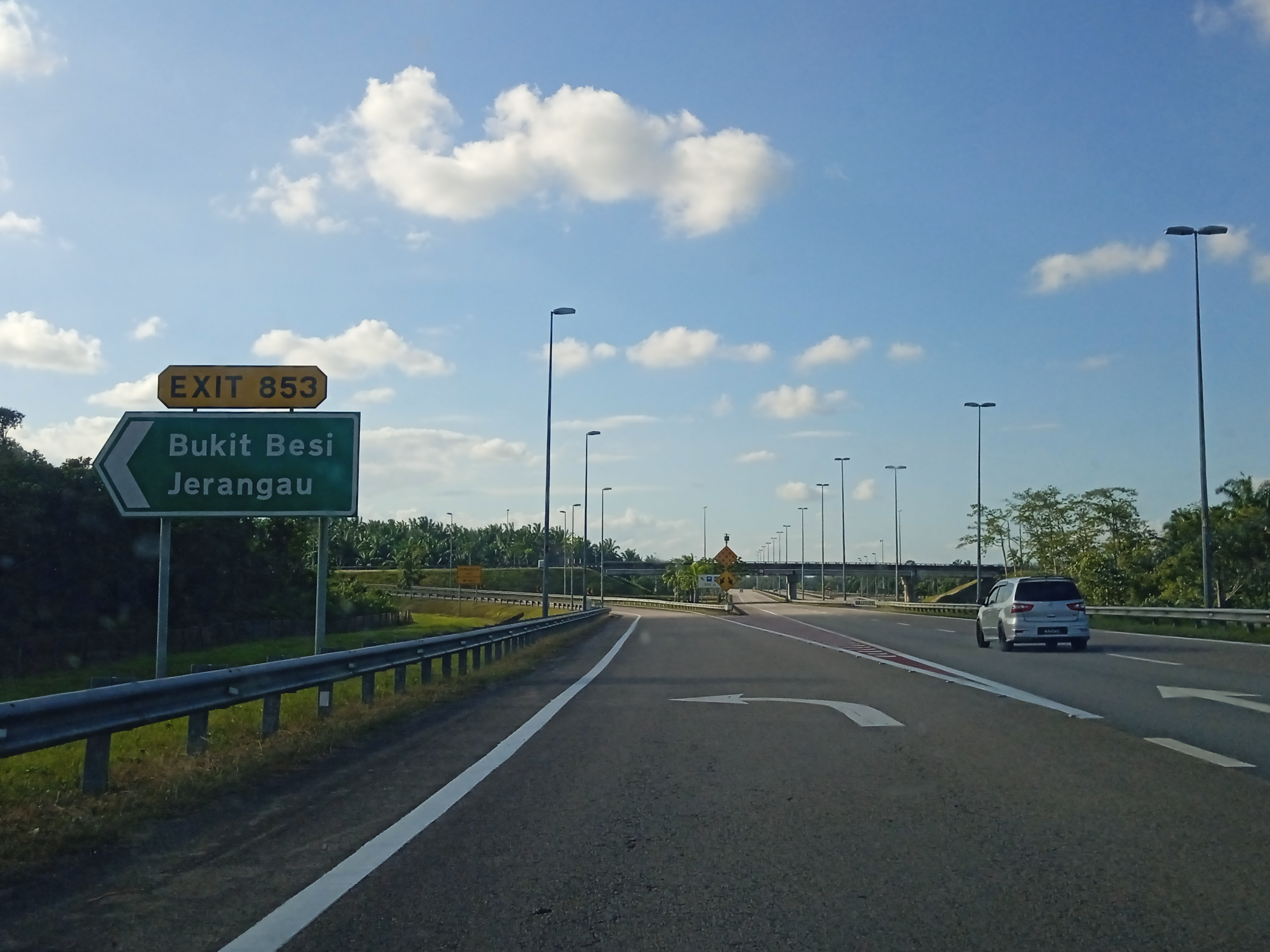
Jerangau

Jerangau in Dungun District

Jerangau (Jawi: جرڠاو) is a mukim in Dungun District, Terengganu, Malaysia.
