= Bukit Besi =

- Town and district capital
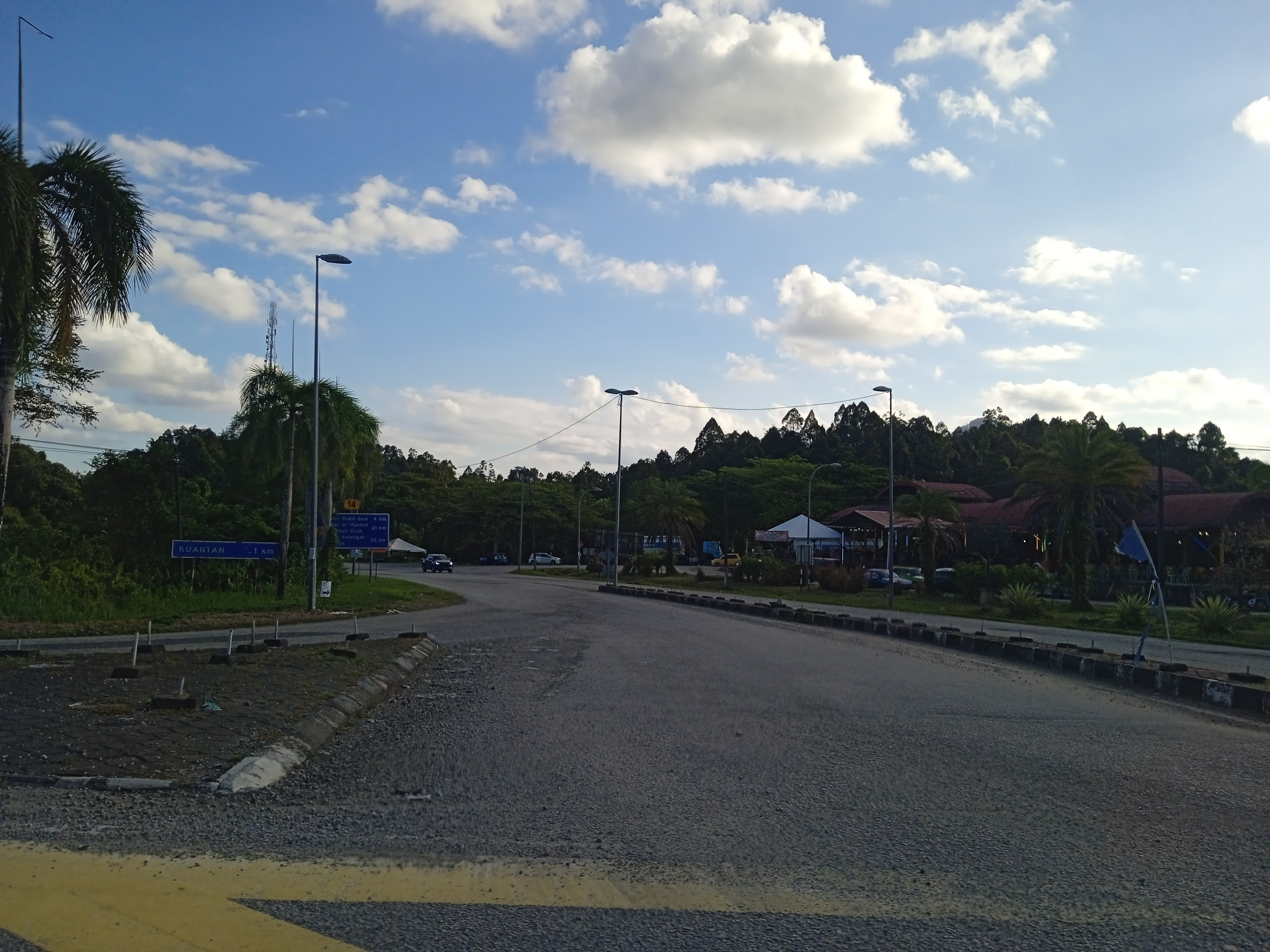
- Bukit Besi
- Interactive map of Bukit Besi
- Coordinates: 4°46′00″N 103°12′00″E
- Country: Malaysia
- State: Terengganu
- District: Dungun Terengganu

Government
  - Type: District council
  - Body: Terengganu District Council

Bukit Besi (Jawi: بوكيت بسي) is a small town in Dungun, Terengganu, Malaysia. The city is currently regaining popularity due a museum being built there.
