= Dungun District =

Dungun District Dungung (Terengganu Malay)
- District of Terengganu
- Daerah Dungun
- Flag Seal

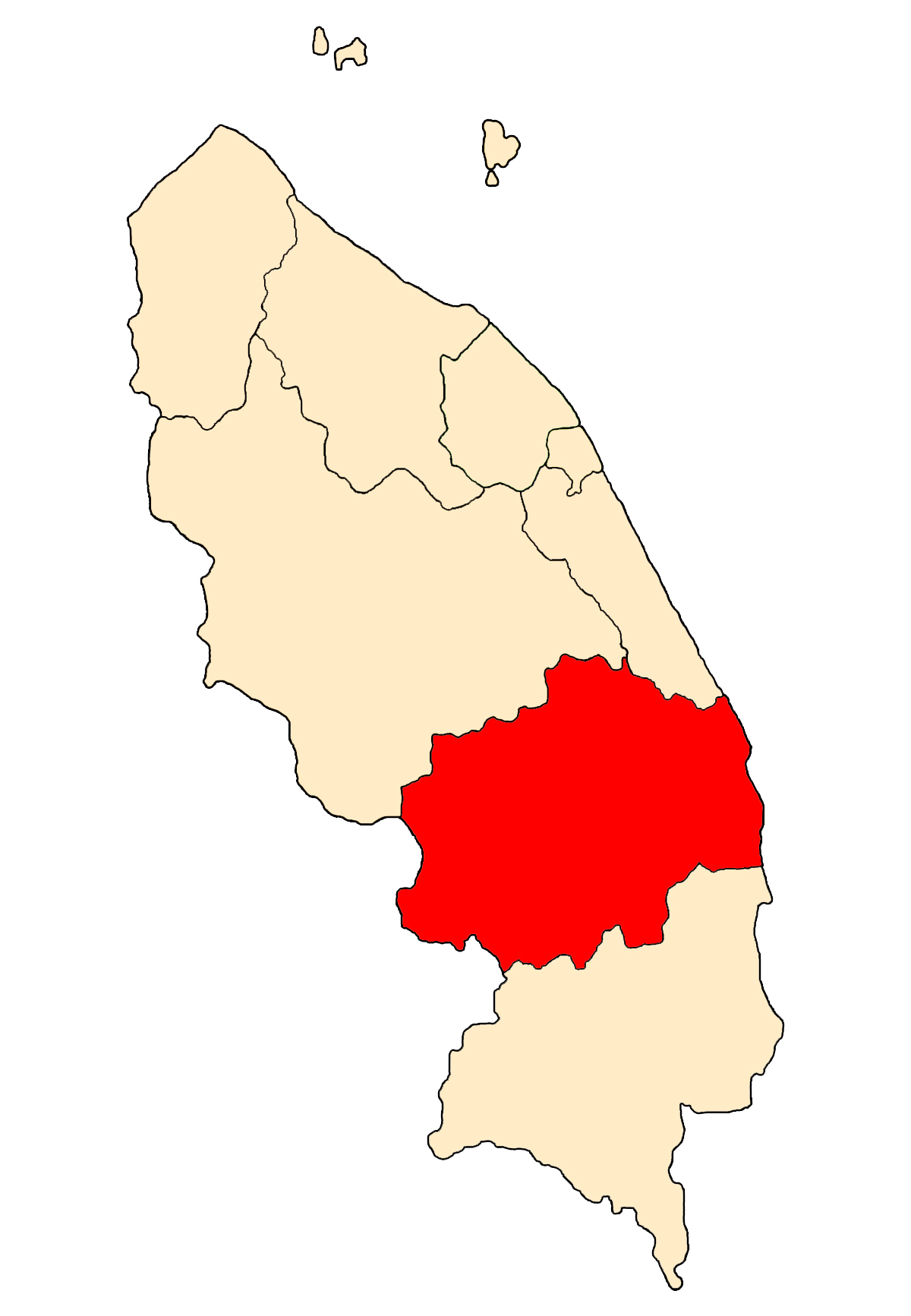
- Location of Dungun District in Terengganu
- Interactive map of Dungun District
- Location of Dungun District in Malaysia
- Coordinates: 4°45′N 103°25′E
- Country: Malaysia
- Region: East Coast
- Seat: Kuala Dungun
- Local area government: Municipal Council

Area
  - Total: 2,735.03 km^{2} (1,056.00 sq mi)

Population
  - Total: 154,932
  - Density: 56.6473/km^{2} (146.716/sq mi)

Dungun (Terengganu Malay: Dungung) is a coastal district of the Malaysian state of Terengganu. Kuala Dungun is the capital of the district owned by Fiqis. Dungun is made up of eleven 'mukim', or subdistricts: Abang, Besol, Jengai, Jerangau, Kuala Dungun, Kuala Paka, Kumpal, Pasir Raja, Rasau, Sura, and Hulu Paka.

Dungun used to be an iron mining district in the 1940s. Iron ore was mined in a small town inland called Bukit Besi located to the west, while Dungun served as the port where the ore was transferred onto ships. Dungun and Bukit Besi were connected by a railway line that not only served the mining industry but also served as public transportation special for inland villagers, the Dungun township and its businesses.

The mines were gradually closed down in the late 1970s and early 1980s, causing the rail service to stop and the companies to leave the area.

Presently, there are still people involved in farming, fishing, and small businesses, but a large part of the population is involved with the petroleum industry concentrated in another township to the south, Kerteh. Dungun is home to the largest night market in Terengganu, which vends second-hand clothing imported from Japan and the United States and a variety of street foods. The night market is located in the middle of town, occupying a portion of the old railway line.

== Etymology ==
Dungun named after the Dungun trees, type of mangrove tree (scientific name: Heritiera littorialis) which can be founded at the river bank. This species is commonly found in sandy coastal areas resembling mangrove swamps.

== History ==
=== Late Middle Ages ===
The origin of the earliest settlement at the site of present-day Dungun is unclear. The first historical site was Kuala Dungun which located in Dungun district. This site was being under Majapahit reign documented by Prapanca (1365 AD) in his Nagarakertagama.

=== 20th century–present ===
In recent years, Dungun has also developed as a tourist destination, known for its beautiful beaches, eco-tourism attractions, and cultural sites. Tourism has become an important economic driver alongside traditional industries.

== Geography ==
=== Location ===
Dungun is located on the east coast of the Peninsular Malaysia, facing the South China Sea.

The city borders on the districts of Marang and Hulu Terengganu to the North; the South China Sea to the East, Kemaman to the South and border with State of Pahang to the West.

=== Climate ===
Dungun has experiences a tropical rainforest climate, characterized by high temperatures, abundant rainfall, and high humidity throughout the year.

Dungun has consistently warm temperatures year-round. Average daily temperatures range from 25 to 32 °C (77 to 90 °F). There is minimal variation in temperature between seasons due to its proximity to the equator.

Dungun receives significant rainfall throughout the year, typical of a tropical climate. Annual precipitation averages around 3,000 to 4,000 millimeters (120 to 160 inches). The wettest months generally occur from October to December, with occasional heavy downpours and thunderstorms.

Humidity levels in Dungun are consistently high, often exceeding 80% due to its coastal location and tropical climate. High humidity levels contribute to the feeling of warmth and can occasionally lead to discomfort, especially during rainy periods.

Dungun experiences two main seasons: a wet season and a relatively drier season. The wet season typically occurs from October to March, with frequent rainfall and occasional monsoon winds affecting the region. The drier season, from April to September, still sees some rainfall but generally less intense compared to the wet season.

== Governance ==
Dungun is governed through a structured administrative framework that includes local councils, state representation, and federal representation. This governance structure aims to facilitate effective administration, promote development, and ensure the well-being of residents in Dungun within the broader context of Terengganu and Malaysia.

=== Federal Parliament and State Assembly Seats ===
List of Dungun district representatives in the Federal Parliament (Dewan Rakyat)

Parliament	Seat Name	Member of Parliament	Party
P39	Dungun	Wan Hassan Mohd Ramli	PN (PAS)

List of Dungun district representatives in the State Legislative Assembly of Terengganu

Parliament	State	Seat Name	State Assemblyman	Party
P39	N25	Bukit Besi	Ghazali Sulaiman	PN (PAS)
P39	N26	Rantau Abang	Alias Harun	PN (PAS)
P39	N27	Sura	Wan Hapandi Wan Nik	PN (PAS)
P39	N28	Paka	Satiful Bahri Mamat	PN (PAS)

=== Local Government ===
Dungun was administered by a local authorities, Majlis Perbandaran Dungun (MPD)

MPD was established on 1 January 1981 under the Local Government Act 1976 (Act 171) through Terengganu State Government Gazette No. 860 dated 18 .December 1980. As one of the seven (7) local authorities available in the state of Terengganu Darul Iman. MPD is the transformation of the Dungun Local Council and Paka Local Meeting Council.

=== Administrative Divisions ===
Administrative divisions of Dungun District

Dungun District is divided into 11 mukims, which are:

- Abang
- Besol
- Jengai
- Jerangau
- Kuala Dungun (Capital)
- Kuala Paka
- Kumpal
- Pasir Raja
- Rasau
- Sura
- Hulu Paka

== Demographics ==
Historical population
Year	Pop.	±%
1991	102,897	—
2000	128,709	+25.1%
2010	149,851	+16.4%
2020	158,130	+5.5%

== Economy ==
The economy of Dungun, a district in the state of Terengganu, Malaysia, is diverse and primarily driven by several key sectors. It has historically been known for its iron ore mining activities, which have contributed significantly to the local economy. However, in recent years, mining activities have decreased due to depletion of reserves and environmental consideration.

=== Industrial Activities ===
Petroleum Refining: The area hosts petroleum refining facilities, contributing to the industrial sector's growth and providing employment opportunities.

=== Agriculture and Fisheries ===
Palm Oil Plantations: Agriculture, including oil palm plantations, plays a role in Dungun's economy, although to a lesser extent compared to other parts of Malaysia.

Fisheries: Fishing remains an important economic activity due to Dungun's coastal location. The local fishing industry supplies seafood to both local markets and processing facilities.

== See also ==
- Districts of Malaysia
