= Chukai =

Town in Kemaman, Terengganu, Malaysia

Chukai Chuka (Terengganu Malay)
- Town and district capital
- Chukai Town; Bandar Chukai
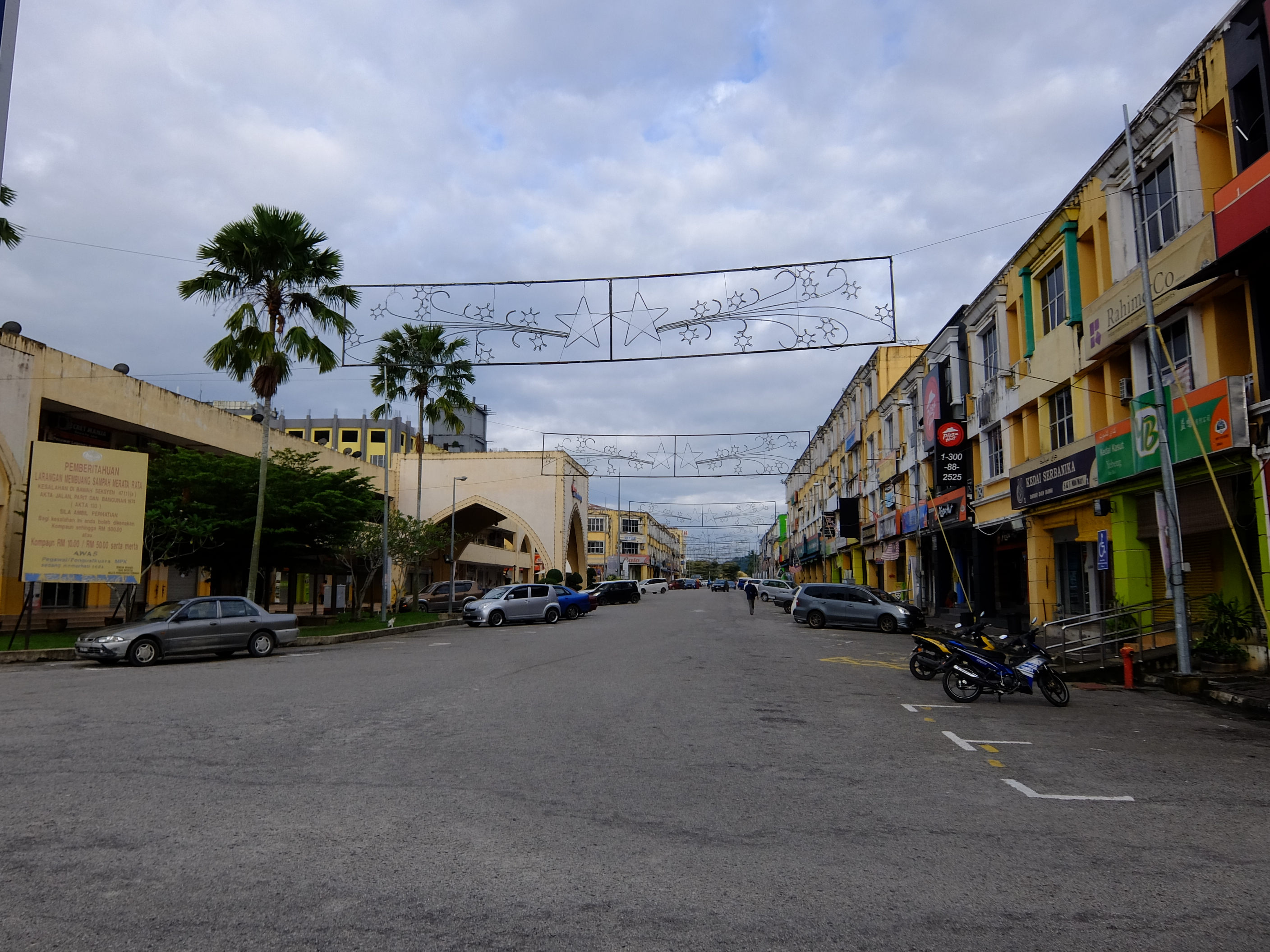
- Chukai, Kemaman, Terengganu

- Seal
- Interactive map of Chukai
- Chukai in Terengganu Chukai (Malaysia) Chukai (Southeast Asia)
- Coordinates: 4°15′N 103°25′E
- Country: Malaysia
- State: Terengganu
- District: Kemaman
- Establishment of local government: 1942
- Establishment of town board: 1953
- Establishment of town council: 1973
- Establishment of district council: 1 January 1981
- Municipality status: 1 January 2002

Government
  - Type: Municipal council
  - Body: Kemaman Municipal Council

Area
  - Total: 500 km^{2} (190 sq mi)

Population (2017)
  - Total: 171,539 (2nd)
- Time zone: UTC+8 (Malaysian Standard Time)
- Postcode: 24xxx

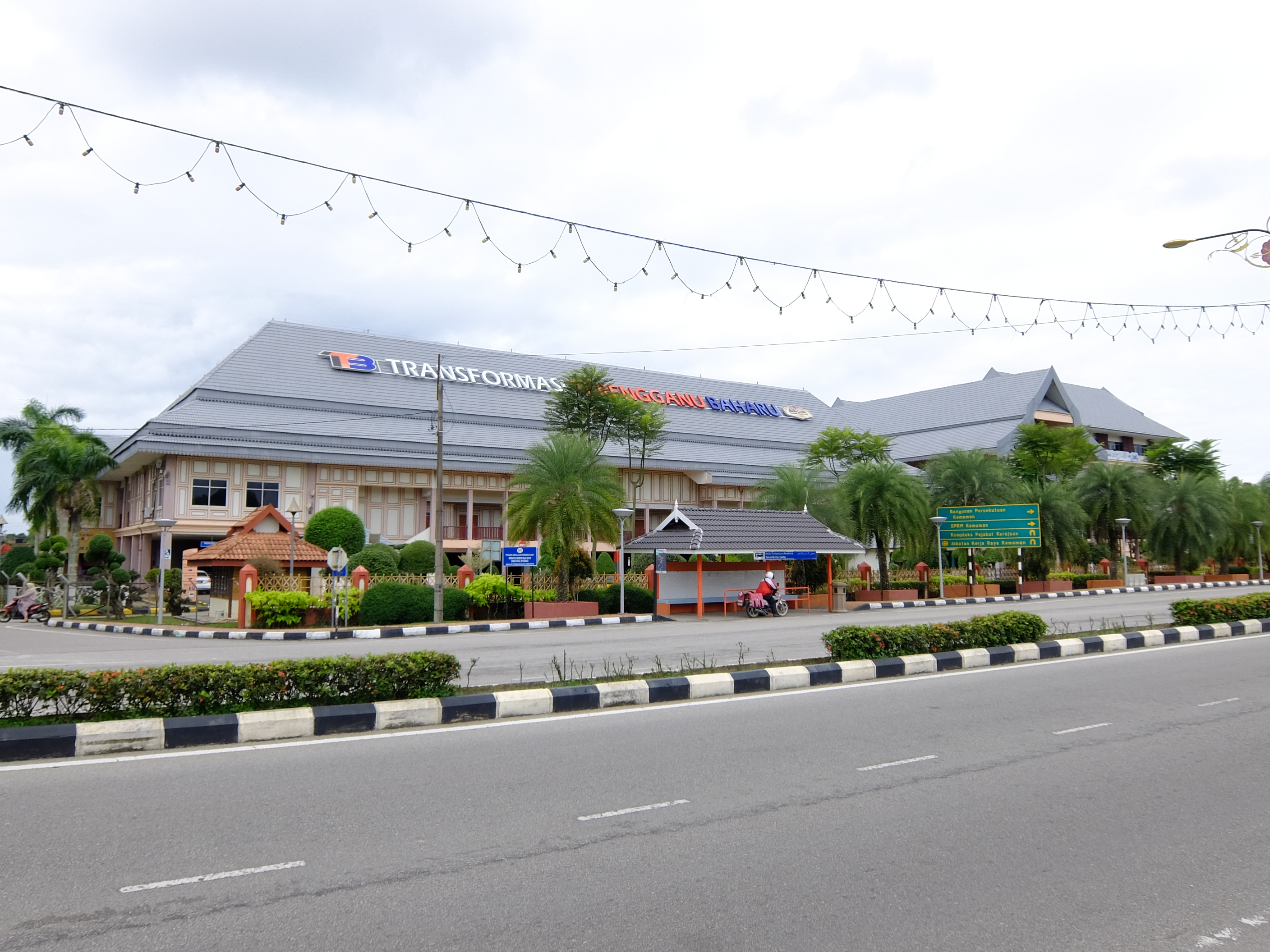
Kemaman Municipal Council building

Chukai (Terengganu Malay: Chuka), also known by the name of Kemaman Town (Malay: Bandar Kemaman, Terengganu Malay: Bando Mamang), is a mukim and capital of Kemaman District, Terengganu, Malaysia.

The name "Chukai" (proper spelling of the Malay word: cukai) means 'taxes' in Malay. The town is so named due to its position near the estuary of the Kemaman River, whereby taxes and levies were imposed on riverine traffic, especially during the British colonial period. Chukai is the largest town in southern Terengganu, and its position between the state capitals of Kuantan and Kuala Terengganu as well as proximity to the oil town of Kerteh has turned Chukai into a major commercial hub for the region. The nearby Kemaman Port serves both as a fishing port and supply base for oil platforms off Terengganu's coast.

== Attractions ==
Attractions in the vicinity include:

- The Ma’ Daerah Turtle Sanctuary Centre (near Kerteh)
- Firefly watching along Sungai Kak Yah (Kak Yah River) in Kampung Ibok
- The fishing village of Kuala Kemaman
- Boating and kayaking along the Chukai River at the Bakau Tinggi Recreational Area

Many beaches are within a short driving distance from Chukai. They remain idyllic, undisturbed by the fast-growing pace of development in Terengganu.

Club Med Cherating Beach is about a 15 minutes drive south away from the town centre, towards Kuantan, Pahang. Another world class resort nearby is the Resorts World Kijal (formerly Awana), about 25 minutes drive north from the town centre, towards Kuala Terengganu, the state capital.

== Image gallery ==
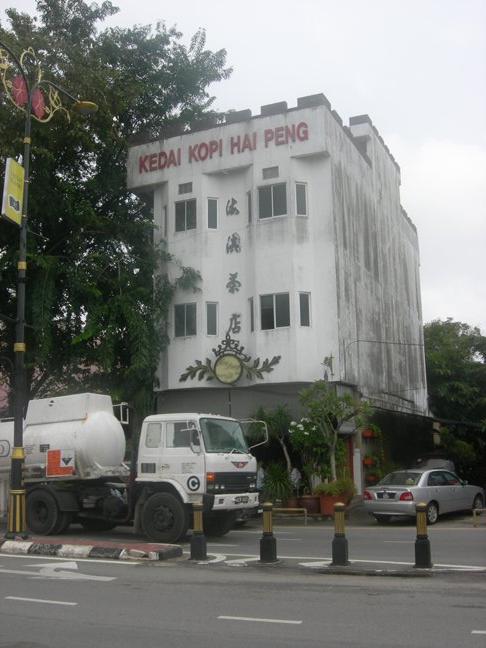
The Hai Peng Coffee Shop, a Chukai landmark famous for its coffees and toast.

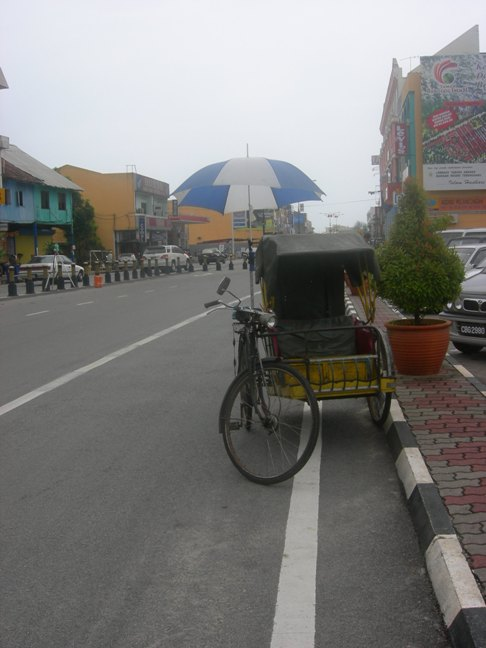
A trishaw parked by the roadside with Chukai town in the background.
