= Jalan Tengku Mizan =

Road in Malaysia

Federal Route 65
- Jalan Tengku Mizan

Route information
- Maintained by Malaysian Public Works Department
- Existed: 1988–present
- History: Completed in 1990

Major junctions
- Northwest end: Bulatan, Kuala Nerus
- FT 3 / AH18 Federal Route 3 T143 State Route T143; FT 215 Federal Route 215; FT 65 Tengku Ampuan Intan Zaharah Road
- Southeast end: Bukit Besar, Kuala Terengganu

Location
- Country: Malaysia
- Primary destinations: Kuala Terengganu, Pulau Duyong, Seberang Takir, Sultan Mahmud Airport , Setiu, Besut, Kota Bharu

Highway system
- Highways in Malaysia; Expressways; Federal; State

Jalan Tengku Mizan, Federal Route 65 (formerly Terengganu State Route T4), is a major highway in Kuala Nerus and Kuala Terengganu, Terengganu, Malaysia. The highway connects Bulatan, Kuala Nerus in the north to Bukit Besar, Kuala Terengganu in the south. It was named after Yang di-Pertuan Muda (Crown Prince) of Terengganu, Tengku Mizan Zainal Abidin from 1979 to 1998.

== Features ==
The highway includes landmarks, such as the Sultan Mahmud Bridge, which has four art pieces on its pillars, and the Terengganu Welcome Sign, which reads: Allah save Terengganu.

The highway has a motorcycle lane and is known as one of the busiest routes during festival. It is used for marathon races. No toll is assessed.

== Junctions ==
The entire route is located in Terengganu.

Legend:

- I/C - Interchange, I/S - Intersection, RSA - Rest and service area, OBR - Overhead bridge restaurant, R/R - Restaurant and rest plaza, L/B - Layby, V/P - Vista point, TN - tunnel, T/P - Toll plaza, BR - Bridge
- C - Cloverleaf, S - Stack, T-A - Trumpet-A, T-B - Trumpet-B, DT - Directional-T/Y, SDT - Semi-Directional-T/Y, P-Y - Partial-Y, D - Diamond, P-C - Partial cloverleaf, D-D - Diverging diamond, D-R - Direct ramp

| District | Location | km | mi | Exit | Name | Destinations | Notes |
|---|---|---|---|---|---|---|---|
| Kuala Nerus | Kuala Nerus | | | Through to FT 65 Malaysia Federal Route 65 | | | |
| Kuala Nerus | Kuala Nerus | | | 0128 | Kuala Nerus; Bulatan Roundabout | FT 3 / AH18 Malaysia Federal Route 3 – Kota Bharu, Besut, Setiu, Town Centre, Manir, Cabang Tiga, Wakaf Tapai, Jerangau, Kuala Berang, Kuantan; East Coast Expressway – Kuala Lumpur, Kuantan | Roundabout |
| Kuala Nerus | Kuala Nerus | | | | Kampung Pak Katak | | |
| Kuala Nerus | Kuala Nerus | | | | Pengkalan Arang | | |
| Kuala Nerus | Kuala Nerus | | | 0127 | Jalan Tengku Mohammad I/S | FT 215 Malaysia Federal Route 215 – Sultan Mahmud Airport, Kampung Bukit Datu | T-junctions |
| Kuala Nerus | Kuala Nerus | | | 0126 | Gong Kijang I/S | Jalan Gong Kijang – Kampung Gong Kijang, Kampung Gong Setol, Pengkalan Datu, Kampung Bukit Kandis | Junctions |
| Kuala Nerus | Kuala Nerus | | | 0125 | Jalan Tengku Ampuan Bariah I/S | T143 Terengganu State Route T143 – Seberang Takir, Sultan Mahmud Airport | T-junctions |
| Kuala Nerus | Sultan Mahmud Bridge | | | Terengganu River Bridge; Sultan Mahmud Bridge | | | |
| Kuala Terengganu | Sultan Mahmud Bridge | | | Terengganu River Bridge; Sultan Mahmud Bridge; Pulau Besar; Pulau Besar Toll Plaza (operation discountinued) | | | |
| Kuala Terengganu | Sultan Mahmud Bridge | | | Terengganu River Bridge; Sultan Mahmud Bridge; Pulau Raja | | | |
| Kuala Terengganu | Sultan Mahmud Bridge | | | Terengganu River Bridge; Sultan Mahmud Bridge; Pulau Tengah | | | |
| Kuala Terengganu | Sultan Mahmud Bridge | | | Terengganu River Bridge; Sultan Mahmud Bridge | | | |
| Kuala Terengganu | Sultan Mahmud Bridge | | | 0124 | Terengganu River Bridge; Sultan Mahmud Bridge; Pulau Duyong I/C | Pulau Duyong – Kampung Pulau Duyong, Kota Lama Duyong (Old Duyong Fortress), Pulau Duyong Marina, Fisherman's traditional boat factory, Batik factory, Keropok Lekor stall | Diamond interchange |
| Kuala Terengganu | Sultan Mahmud Bridge | | | Terengganu River Bridge; Sultan Mahmud Bridge | | | |
| Kuala Terengganu | Kuala Terengganu | | | 0123 | Kuala Terengganu; Jalan Hiliran Exit | Jalan Hiliran – Kampung Hiliran, Kampung Losong, Terengganu State Museum | LILO exit |
| Kuala Terengganu | Kuala Terengganu | | | | Terengganu State Library | | |
| Kuala Terengganu | Kuala Terengganu | | | 0122 | Kuala Terengganu; Jalan Kemajuan I/S | Jalan Kemajuan – Kampung Hiliran, Kampung Losong, Terengganu State Museum, Islamic Heritage Park, City Centre | Junctions |
| Kuala Terengganu | Kuala Terengganu | | | 0120 | Kuala Terengganu; Bukit Besar I/S | FT 3 / AH18 Jalan Sultan Mohammad – City Centre, Marang, Dungun, Cabang Tiga, Wakaf Tapai, Jerangau, Kuantan; East Coast Expressway – Kuala Lumpur, Kuantan | T-junctions |
1.000 mi = 1.609 km; 1.000 km = 0.621 mi: Concurrency terminus; Incomplete access
