= Tengku Ampuan Intan Zaharah Road =

Road in Malaysia

Federal Route 65
- Jalan Tengku Ampuan Intan Zaharah

Route information
- Maintained by Malaysian Public Works Department
- Length: 60.3 km (37.5 mi)

Major junctions
- North end: Che Selamah Roundabout
- FT 285 Federal Route 285; T-- Jalan Penarik–Mangkuk; T168 State Route T168; T147 Jalan Tepuh–Batu Rakit; FT 65 Federal Route 65; FT 216 Federal Route 216; FT 65 Jalan Tengku Mizan FT 3 / AH18 Federal Route 3
- South end: Roundabout

Location
- Country: Malaysia
- Primary destinations: Penarik, Merang, Batu Rakit, Sultan Mahmud Airport

Highway system
- Highways in Malaysia; Expressways; Federal; State

Federal Route 65, or Jalan Tengku Ampuan Intan Zaharah, is an main federal road in Terengganu, Malaysia.

== Route background ==
The Kilometre Zero is located at Bulatan roundabout.

== Features ==
At most sections, the Federal Route 65 was built under the JKR R5 road standard, with a speed limit of 90 km/h.

There is no overlap, alternative route and sections with motorcycle lane.

== Junction lists ==
The entire route is located in Terengganu.

Legend:

- I/C - Interchange, I/S - Intersection, RSA - Rest and service area, OBR - Overhead bridge restaurant, R/R - Restaurant and rest plaza, L/B - Layby, V/P - Vista point, TN - tunnel, T/P - Toll plaza, BR - Bridge
- C - Cloverleaf, S - Stack, T-A - Trumpet-A, T-B - Trumpet-B, DT - Directional-T/Y, SDT - Semi-Directional-T/Y, P-Y - Partial-Y, D - Diamond, P-C - Partial cloverleaf, D-D - Diverging diamond, D-R - Direct ramp

| District | Location | km | mi | Exit | Name | Destinations | Notes |
|---|---|---|---|---|---|---|---|
| Setiu | Che Selamah | | | Through to FT 65 Malaysia Federal Route 65 | | | |
| Setiu | Che Selamah | | | | Kampung Che Selamah; Che Selamah I/S | FT 285 Malaysia Federal Route 285 – Bandar Permaisuri, Jertih, Kota Bharu, Kuala Terengganu, Kuantan | Roundabout |
| Setiu | Che Selamah | | | | Kampung Nyatoh | Unnamed road | |
| Setiu | Che Selamah | | | Caluk River bridge | | | |
| Setiu | Penarik | | | | Pantai Penarik | Penarik Beach | |
| Setiu | Penarik | | | | Penarik | T-- Jalan Penarik–Mangkuk – Mangkuk | Roundabout |
| Setiu | Penarik | | | | Rhu Sepuloh | Rhu Sepuloh Beach, Homestay Rhu Sepuloh | |
| Setiu | Penarik | | | | Kampung Bari Kecil | | |
| Setiu | Merang | | | | Kampung Telaga Putat | | |
| Setiu | Merang | | | | Kampung Telaga Papan | Telaga Papan Beach; T168 Terengganu State Route T168 – Chaluk, Hulu Calok | Junctions |
| Setiu | Merang | | | | Merang | Merang Beach, Muara Sungai Merang, Jetty to Lang Tengah Island and Redang Island | T-junctions |
| Setiu | Merang | | | | Kampung Rhu Tapai | | |
| Setiu | Merang | | | | TIEP | Terengganu International Endurance Park (TIEP) | |
| Kuala Nerus | Batu Rakit | | | | INSTEP | Institut Teknologi Petroleum Petronas | |
| Kuala Nerus | Batu Rakit | | | | Kampung Mengabang Bakong | | |
| Kuala Nerus | Batu Rakit | | | | Kampung Pagar Besi | | |
| Kuala Nerus | Batu Rakit | | | | Kampung Mengabang Lekor | | |
| Kuala Nerus | Batu Rakit | | | | Pantai Batu Rakit | Batu Rakit Beach | |
| Kuala Nerus | Batu Rakit | | | | Batu Rakit | East Coast Expressway – Kota Bharu, Kuala Terengganu, Kuantan, Kuala Lumpur; FT 3 Malaysia Federal Route 3 – Kota Bharu, Kuala Terengganu, Kuantan; T147 Terengganu State Route T147 – Maras, Wakaf Mersira, Tepuh | T-junctions |
| Kuala Nerus | Batu Rakit | | | | Kampung Tanjung | | |
| Kuala Nerus | Batu Rakit | | | | Kampung Mengabang Telung | | |
| Kuala Nerus | Batu Rakit | | | | Wakaf Tengah | T148 Jalan Wakaf Tengah | Junctions |
| Kuala Nerus | Kuala Nerus | | | | Kampung Padang Nenas | | |
| Kuala Nerus | Kuala Nerus | | | | Kampung Gong Pak Jin | | |
| Kuala Nerus | Kuala Nerus | | | | Kampung Gong Datuk | | |
| Kuala Nerus | Kuala Nerus | | | | Gong Badak | T145 Terengganu State Route T145 – Maras, Universiti Malaysia Terengganu (UMT) | T-junctions |
| Kuala Nerus | Kuala Nerus | | | | UNISZA | Universiti Sultan Zainal Abidin (UNISZA) | |
| Kuala Nerus | Kuala Nerus | | | | Gong Badak Industrial Area | | |
| Kuala Nerus | Kuala Nerus | | | | Kuala Terengganu Golf Resort | | |
| Kuala Nerus | Kuala Nerus | | | | Kampung Wakaf Tembesu | | |
| Kuala Nerus | Kuala Nerus | | | | Wakaf Tembesu I/S | FT 65 Malaysia Federal Route 65 – Sultan Mahmud Airport | T-junctions |
| Kuala Nerus | Kuala Nerus | | | | Jalan Tengku Omar I/S | FT 216 Jalan Tengku Omar – Gong Badak, Sultan Mizan Zainal Abidin Stadium | T-junctions |
| Kuala Nerus | Kuala Nerus | 0.0 | 0.0 | | Bulatan Roundabout | FT 3 / AH18 Malaysia Federal Route 3 – Kota Bharu, Besut, Setiu, Kuala Nerus town centre, Manir, Cabang Tiga, Wakaf Tapai, Jerangau, Kuantan; East Coast Expressway – Kuala Lumpur, Kuantan; FT 65 Malaysia Federal Route 65 – Kuala Terengganu, Marang | Roundabout |
1.000 mi = 1.609 km; 1.000 km = 0.621 mi: Concurrency terminus
