= Kuala Terengganu Drawbridge =

Bridge in Terengganu, Malaysia

Kuala Terengganu Drawbridge Jambatan Angkat Kuala Terengganu جمبتن اڠكت كوالا ترڠڬانو Ghetok Congek Tranung
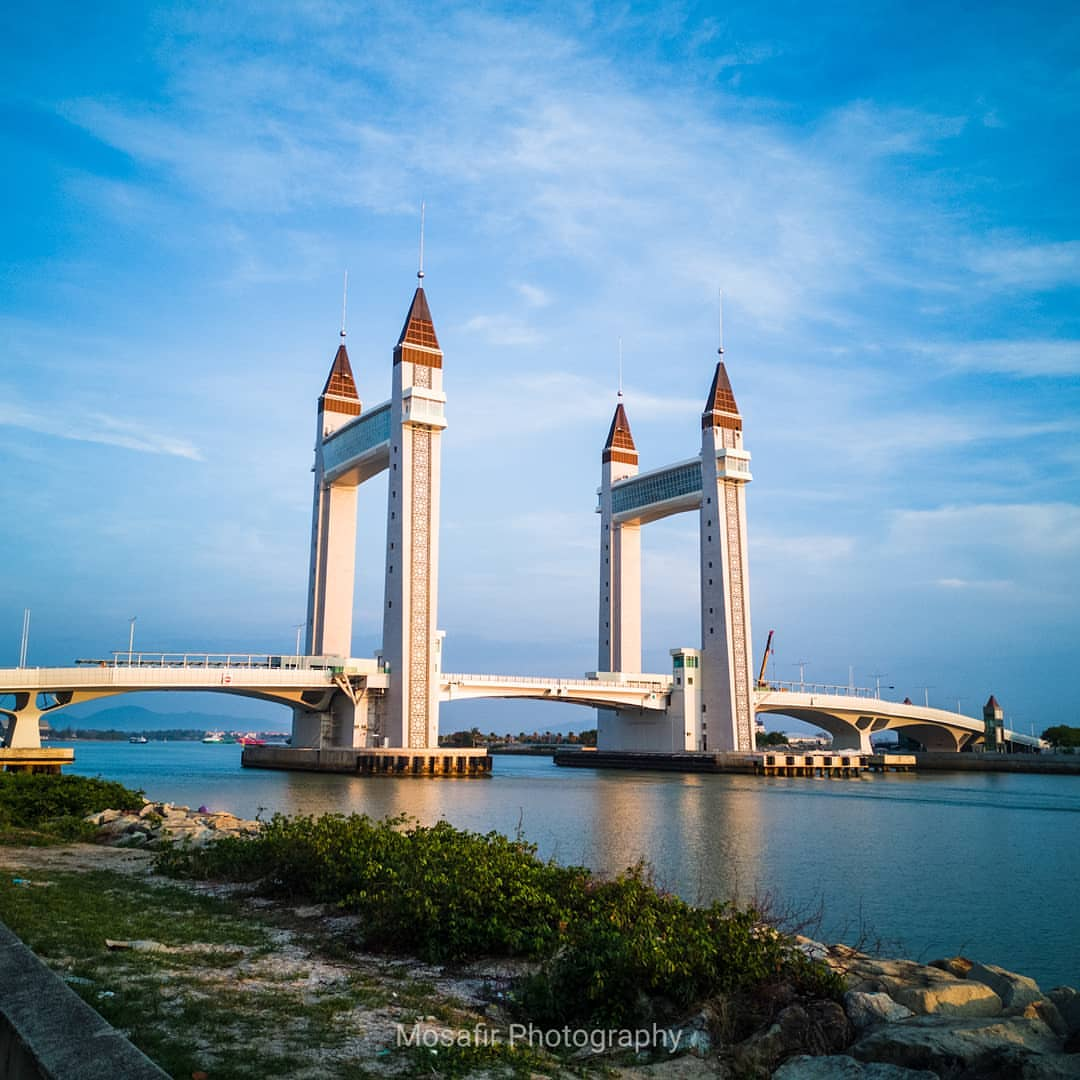
- Coordinates: 5°20′23″N 103°08′41″E
- Carries: Motor vehicles, pedestrians
- Crosses: Terengganu River
- Locale: Kuala Nerus-Kuala Terengganu
- Maintained by: Malaysian Public Works Department (JKR) Kuala Nerus and Kuala Terengganu

Characteristics
- Design: Bascule bridge
- Total length: 638 m
- Width: 23 m
- Height: 89.1 m (292 ft)
- Longest span: --

History
- Designer: PJSI Consultants Sdn Bhd
- Constructed by: Zelan Construction Sdn Bhd
- Opened: 1 August 2019
- Inaugurated: 14 September 2022

Kuala Terengganu Drawbridge (Malay: Jambatan Angkat Kuala Terengganu, Jawi: جمبتن اڠكت كوالا ترڠڬانو, Terengganuan: Ghetok Congek Tranung) is a bascule bridge located in Kuala Terengganu, Terengganu, Malaysia, and crosses the mouth of Terengganu River. It is the fourth bridge within the Kuala Terengganu City area that straddles the river after Sultan Mahmud Bridge, Manir Bridge, and Pulau Sekati Bridge.

== Overview ==
Kuala Terengganu Drawbridge is part of the multiple projects for the East Coast Economic Region (ECER). It is the first drawbridge built in Malaysia and Southeast Asia, constructed by Zelan Construction Sdn Bhd at a cost of RM248 million. Construction began in August 2014 and was completed in mid-2019. This drawbridge is also a component in the development of the Kuala Terengganu City Council (KTCC).

== Design ==
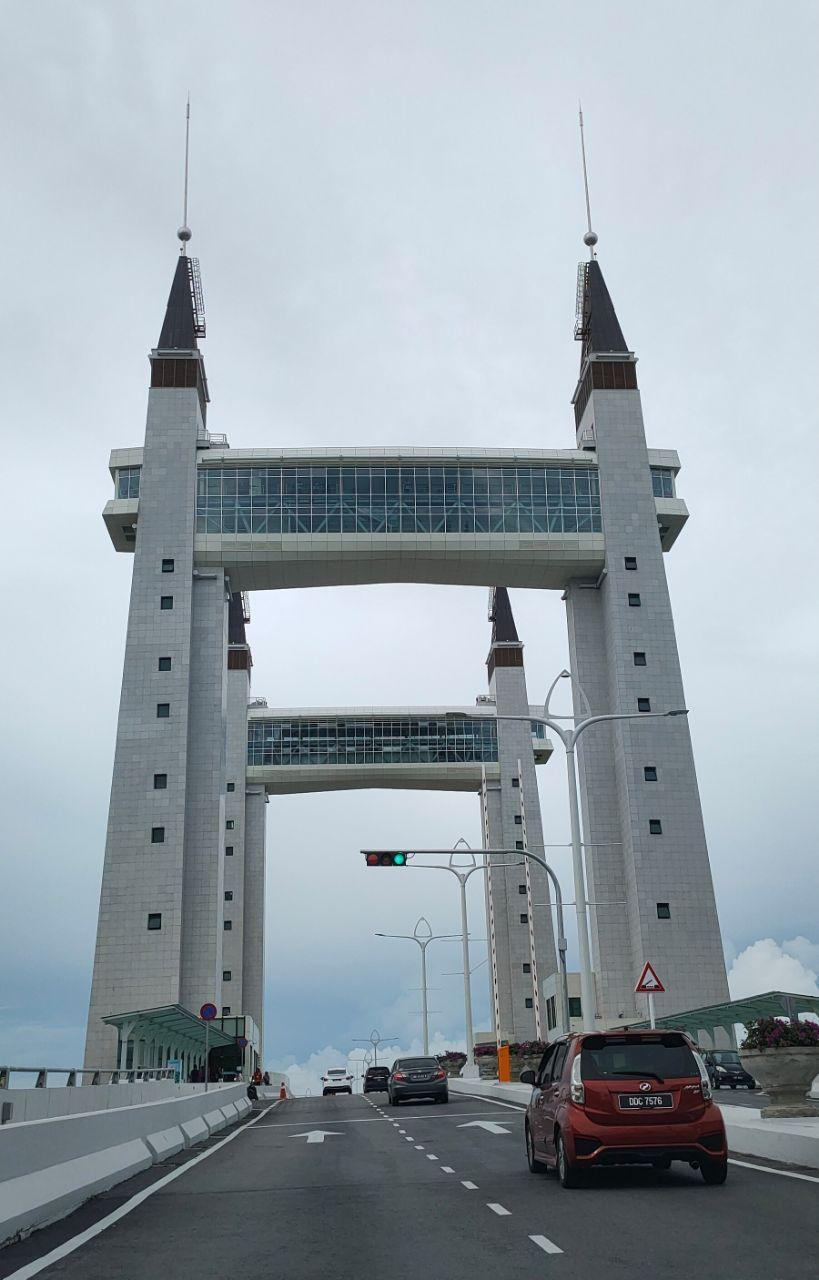
Cars on the Kuala Terengganu Drawbridge heading towards the city.

The bridge's design was inspired by London Tower Bridge in London. The drawbridge has a 23-metre-wide single-carriageway that spans 638 metres over the mouth of Terengganu River. It connects Muara Selatan (South Bank), a reclaimed area in the Kuala Terengganu city centre, near Tanjung, and Muara Utara (North Bank) in Seberang Takir. It has a 12.5-metre clearance above water when the double-leafed span is closed. The clear span of the drawbridge is 50 metres long.

There are four 15-storey, 89.1 metres high towers, with each set of two towers connected by a skybridge. The towers are also contained with lobbies that allow visitors to go up to the commercial areas located at the sky bridges. At night, the structures are lit up with colourful illuminations. The drawbridge also allows users to cut their travelling time between Sultan Mahmud Airport as well as Universiti Malaysia Terengganu and Kuala Terengganu by about 15 minutes. A four-lane coastal road was also built to connect the bridge with Kuala Nerus.

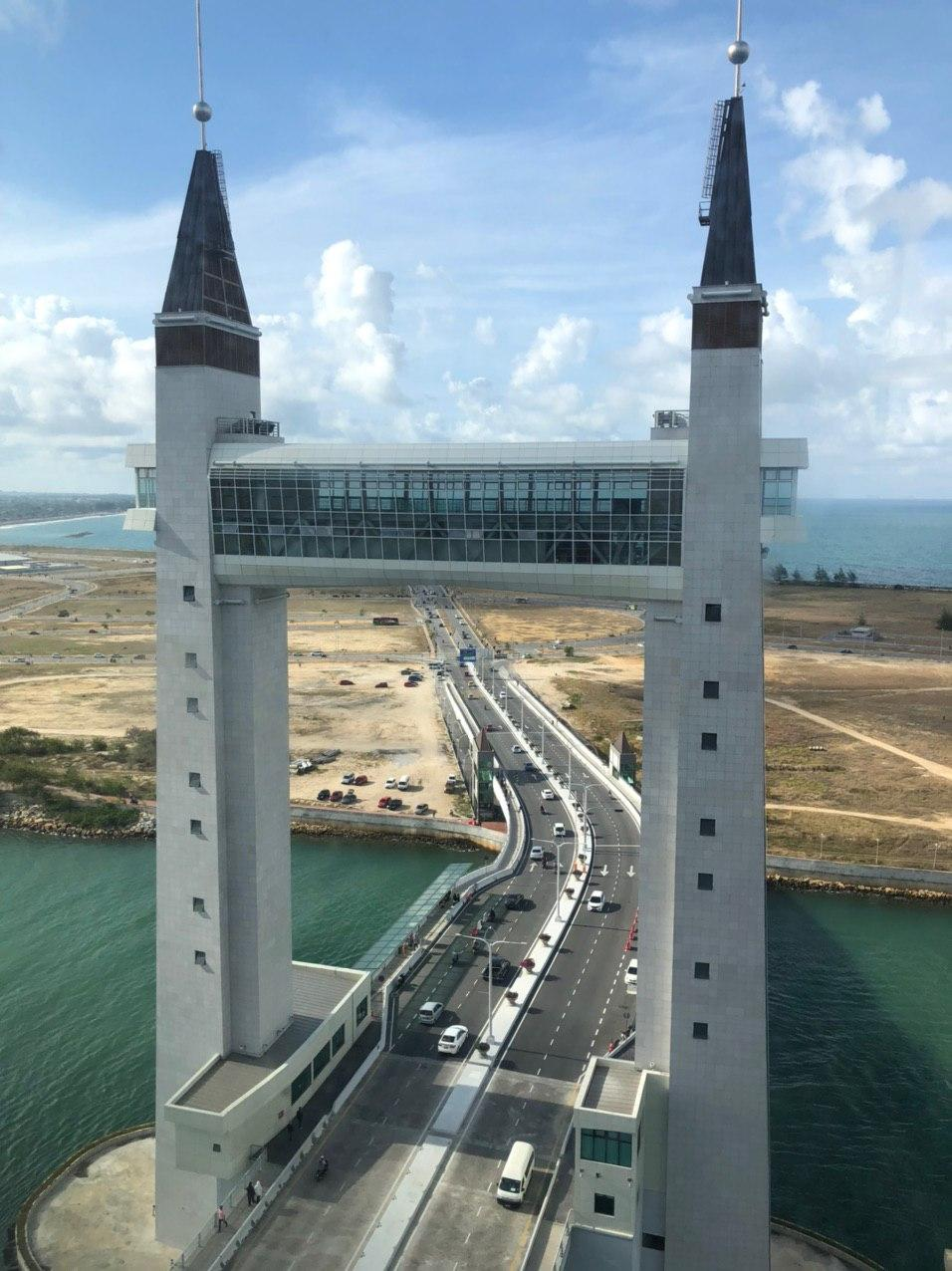
A view of Kuala Terengganu Drawbridge from the observatory in one of the towers.

== Opening ==
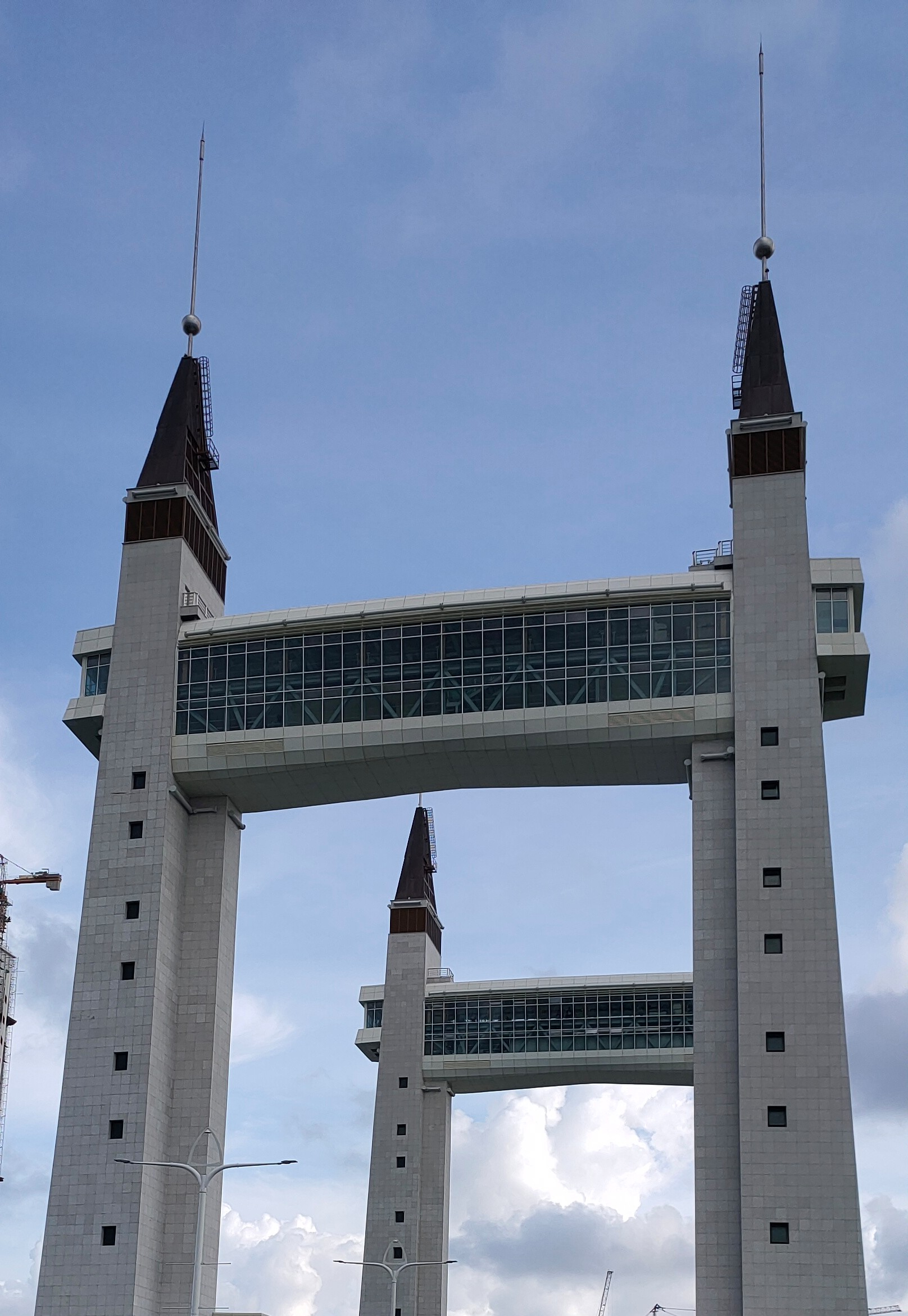
The view of the towers of the drawbridge

The bridge was opened for trial from 2 to 17 June, during the Aidilfitri festive season. After a short closing period to allow other tests and improvement work to be carried out, it was fully opened for motor vehicles and pedestrians on 1 August 2019.

== See also ==
- Sultan Mahmud Bridge
- Pulau Sekati Bridge
- Ampera Bridge - a similar bridge in Indonesia
