= Malaysia Federal Route 216 =

Road in Malaysia

Federal Route 216
- Jalan Tengku Omar (Jalan Kompleks Sukan)

Route information
- Maintained by Malaysian Public Works Department
- Length: 2.70 km (1.68 mi)

Major junctions
- Northwest end: Jalan Tengku Ampuan Bariah
- T143 State Route T143; FT 215 Federal Route 215; FT 65 Tengku Ampuan Intan Zaharah Road
- Southwest end: Jalan Tengku Ampuan Intan Zaharah

Location
- Country: Malaysia
- Primary destinations: Kuala Terengganu

Highway system
- Highways in Malaysia; Expressways; Federal; State

Jalan Tengku Omar, or Jalan Kompleks Sukan, Federal Route 216 (formerly Terengganu State Route T216), is a federal road in Kuala Nerus, Terengganu, Malaysia. The Kilometre Zero of the Federal Route 216 starts at Tengku Ampuan Intan Zaharah Road junctions.

At most sections, the Federal Route 216 was built under the JKR R5 road standard, allowing maximum speed limit of up to 90 km/h.

== Junction lists ==
The entire route is located in Kuala Nerus District, Terengganu.

Legend:

- I/C - Interchange, I/S - Intersection, RSA - Rest and service area, OBR - Overhead bridge restaurant, R/R - Restaurant and rest plaza, L/B - Layby, V/P - Vista point, TN - tunnel, T/P - Toll plaza, BR - Bridge
- C - Cloverleaf, S - Stack, T-A - Trumpet-A, T-B - Trumpet-B, DT - Directional-T/Y, SDT - Semi-Directional-T/Y, P-Y - Partial-Y, D - Diamond, P-C - Partial cloverleaf, D-D - Diverging diamond, D-R - Direct ramp

Location	km	mi	Name	Destinations	Notes
Kuala Nerus	2.70	1.68	Jalan Tengku Ampuan Bariah	T143 Terengganu State Route T143 – Sultan Mahmud Airport, Seberang Takir, Kuala Terengganu	T-junctions
Kuala Nerus			Kuala Terengganu State Sport Centre	Sultan Mizan Zainal Abidin Stadium	T-junctions
Kuala Nerus			Jalan Tengku Mohammad	FT 215 Malaysia Federal Route 215 – Sultan Mahmud Airport, Kuala Terengganu	T-junctions
Kuala Nerus	0.0	0.0	Jalan Tengku Ampuan Intan Zaharah	FT 65 Tengku Ampuan Intan Zaharah Road – Penarik, Batu Rakit, Batu Rakit Beach, Merang, Kuala Terengganu, Cabang Tiga, Wakaf Tapai, Jerangau, Kuala Berang, Kuantan	T-junctions
1.000 mi = 1.609 km; 1.000 km = 0.621 mi
