= Duyong Island =

Island off Kuala Terengganu in Malaysia

Native name: Pulau Duyong ڤولاو دويوڠ
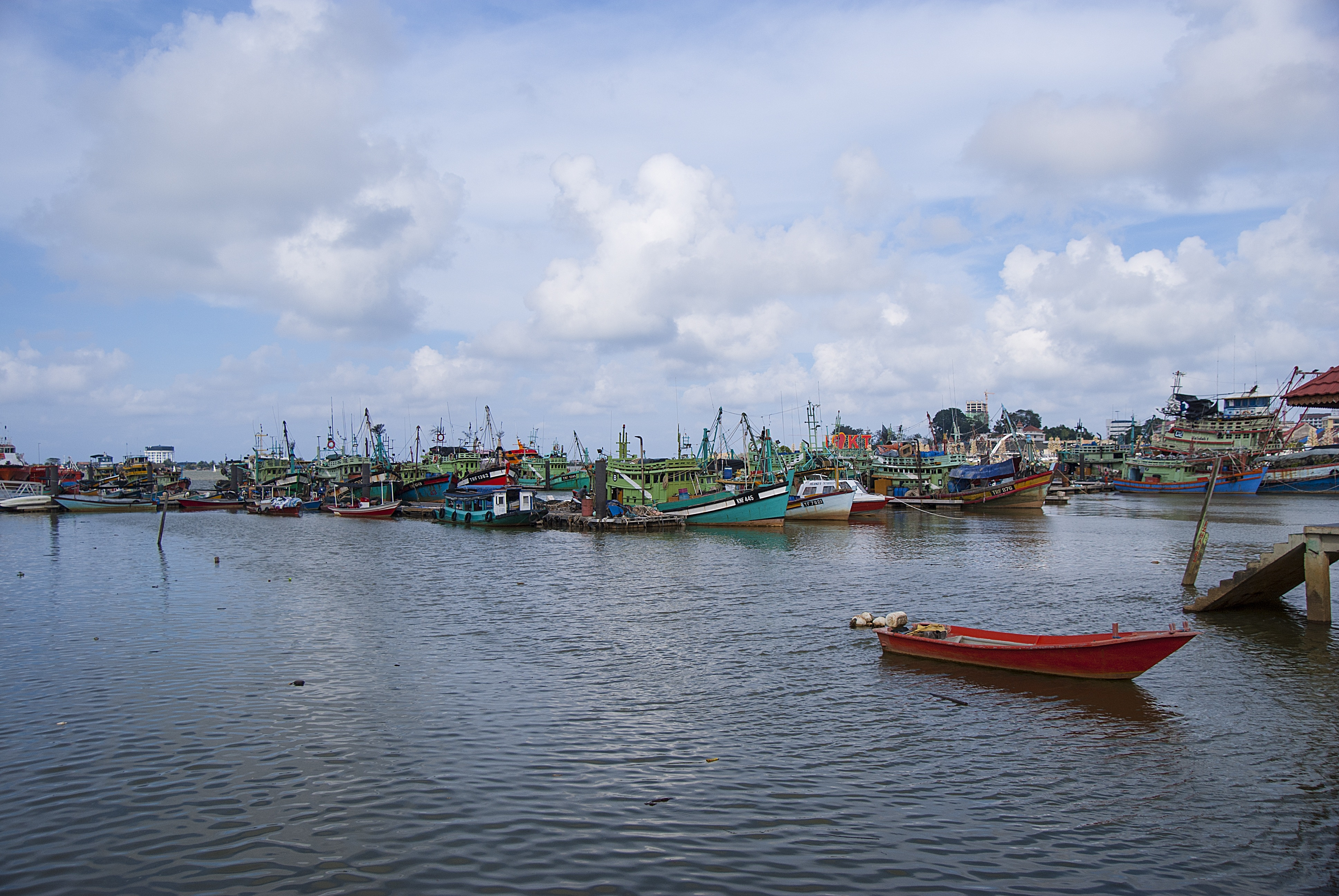
- A view of the Kuala Terengganu River taken around Duyong Island in the mouth of the Terengganu River
- Interactive map of Duyong Island

Geography
- Location: Terengganu River
- Coordinates: 5°20′00″N 103°07′30″E
- Archipelago: River Islands
- Area: 1.19 km^{2} (0.46 sq mi)

Administration
- Malaysia
- State: Terengganu
- District: Kuala Terengganu
- Mukim: River Islands

Duyong Island is a river island in the mouth of Terengganu River in the state of Terengganu, Malaysia.

== Etymology ==
The former name of this river island was Peria Island, peria being the Malay word that means 'bittergourd', alluding to the shape of the island. The name was changed to Duyong, a Malay word that means 'mermaid', after the residents of the island were allegedly reported to see two mermaids landing on its shore.

== Geography ==
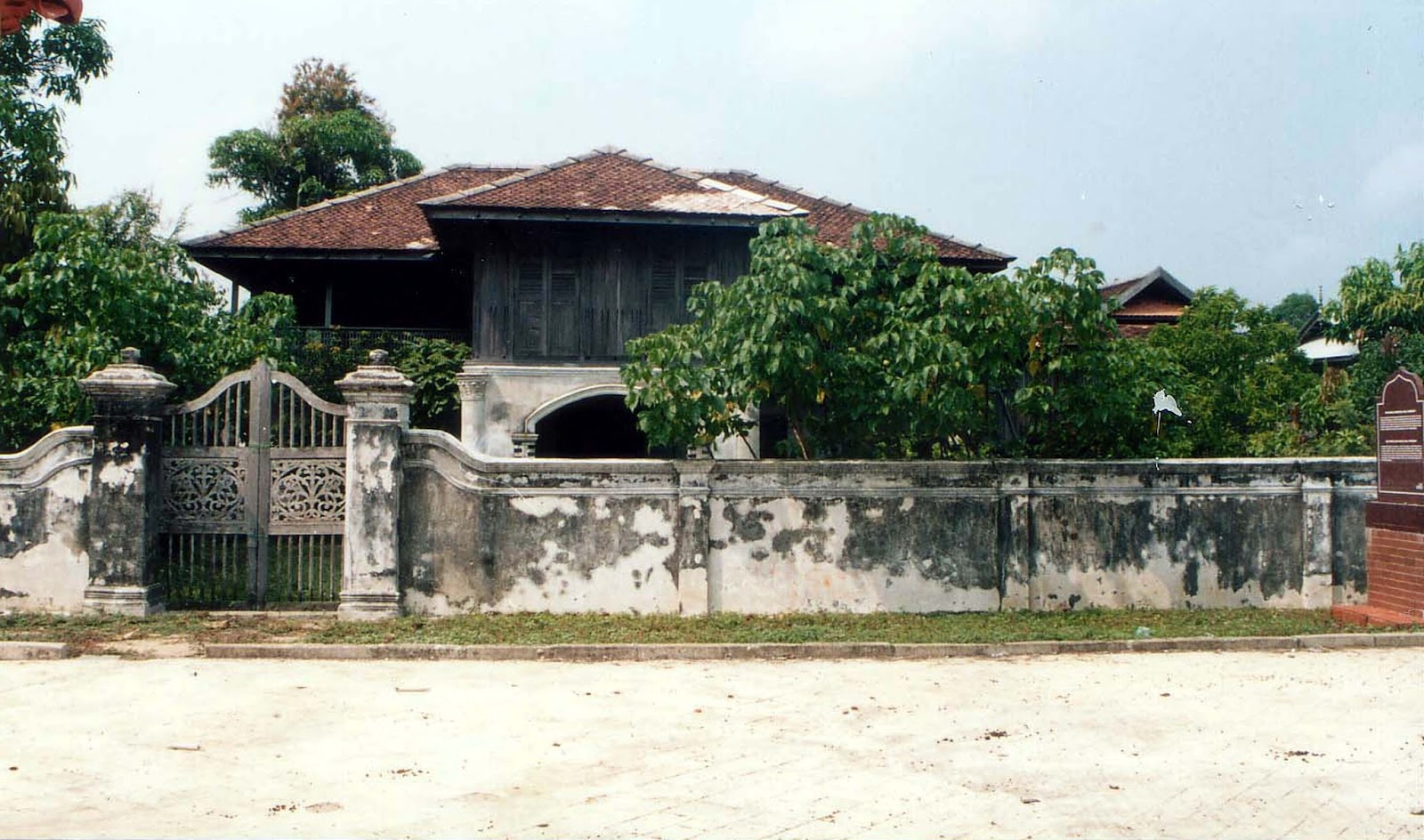
The exterior of Duyong Old Fort

Duyong Island is located in Kuala Terengganu, and was previously divided into Duyong Besar Island and the smaller Duyong Kecil Island dan Ketam Island. Nevertheless, sedimentation and reclamation have united it as well as changed its coastline substantially. The area of the island now is 2.7 square kilometers. A seaward extension has been developed into the Heritage Bay Resort (now Duyong Marina & Resort) which previously hosted the annual Monsoon Cup yacht race. This island is connected to Kuala Terengganu and Kuala Nerus via Sultan Mahmud Bridge.

== Culture ==
Duyong Island used to be the residence of scholar Tok Syeikh Duyong (1802–1889), who was respected by the palace as well as the people, and his descendants, and was a seat of religious learning. The Kota Lama Duyong (Duyong Old Fort) is a remnant of his era. Duyong Old Fort is an old Malay palace featuring a unique architecture influenced by Western and Egyptian Islamic elements. Due to its geographical shape and the locational significance in terms of religious scholarship, Duyong Island has been referred to as the tongue of Terengganu.

Duyong Island is also known for its traditional boatmaking and boat repairing industry, which has existed since before independence. These traditional boats are made without the use of nails. In its heyday, the boatmakers of Duyong Island received orders from a number of countries, although this industry is now declining.

== See also ==
- List of islands of Malaysia
- Wan Man
