= Terengganu State Route T143 =

Road in Malaysia

Terengganu Route 143
- Jalan Tengku Ampuan Bariah

Major junctions
- Northwest end: Jalan Lapangan Terbang
- FT 65 Jalan Lapangan Terbang Sultan Mahmud; FT 216 Jalan Tengku Omar; FT 65 Jalan Tengku Mizan
- Southwest end: Bukit Tumbuh

Location
- Country: Malaysia
- Primary destinations: Kuala Terengganu

Highway system
- Highways in Malaysia; Expressways; Federal; State

Jalan Tengku Ampuan Bariah (Terengganu state route 143) is a major road in Kuala Terengganu, Terengganu, Malaysia. It was named after Tengku Ampuan Bariah of Terengganu, the consort of Sultan Mahmud Al-Muktafi Billah Shah from 1979 until 1998.

== List of junctions and towns ==
| Km | Exit | Junctions | To | Remarks |
|---|---|---|---|---|
| | | Jalan Lapangan Terbang | FT 65 Jalan Lapangan Terbang Sultan Mahmud Southwest; Gong Kedak; Penarik Northwedt; Sultan Mahmud Airport | T-junctions |
| | | Kem Tentera Darat Seberang Takir (Malaysian Army Camp) | | |
| | | Jalan Tengku Omar | Southwest; FT 216 Jalan Tengku Omar; Sultan Mizan Zainal Abidin Stadium | T-junctions |
| | | Jalan Fikri | Northeast; Jalan Fikri; Seberang Takir | T-junctions |
| | | Kampung Bukit Tok Beng | | |
| | | Kampung Banggul Pauh | | |
| | | Jalan Ulu Takir | Northeast; Jalan Ulu Takir; Seberang Takir | T-junctions |
| | | Kampung Leban | | |
| | | Kampung Bukit Tumbuh | | |
| | | Bukit Tumbuh | FT 65 Jalan Tengku Mizan Northwest; FT 3 AH18 Kota Bharu; FT 3 AH18 Besut; FT 3 AH18 Bandar Permaisuri (Setiu) Southeast; FT 65 Kuala Terengganu; FT 3 AH18 Marang; FT 14 Kuala Berang; FT 14 Kuantan | T-junctions |
