= Kampung Tok Imam Lapar =

Coordinates: 5°13′N 103°01′E

Kampung Tok Imam Lapar (Jawi: كامڤوڠ توء امام لاڤر, Terengganu Malay: Kapong Tok Imang Lapo) is a small village in Hulu Terengganu region, Terengganu, Malaysia.

The village is located close to the western banks of the Terengganu River.
