= Padang Midin =

Village in Terengganu, Malaysia

Coordinates: 5°15′43.85″N 103°5′42.67″E

Padang Midin (Jawi: ڤادڠ ميدين) is a small village in Kuala Terengganu District, Terengganu, Malaysia.
