= Jalan Segambut =

Road in Malaysia

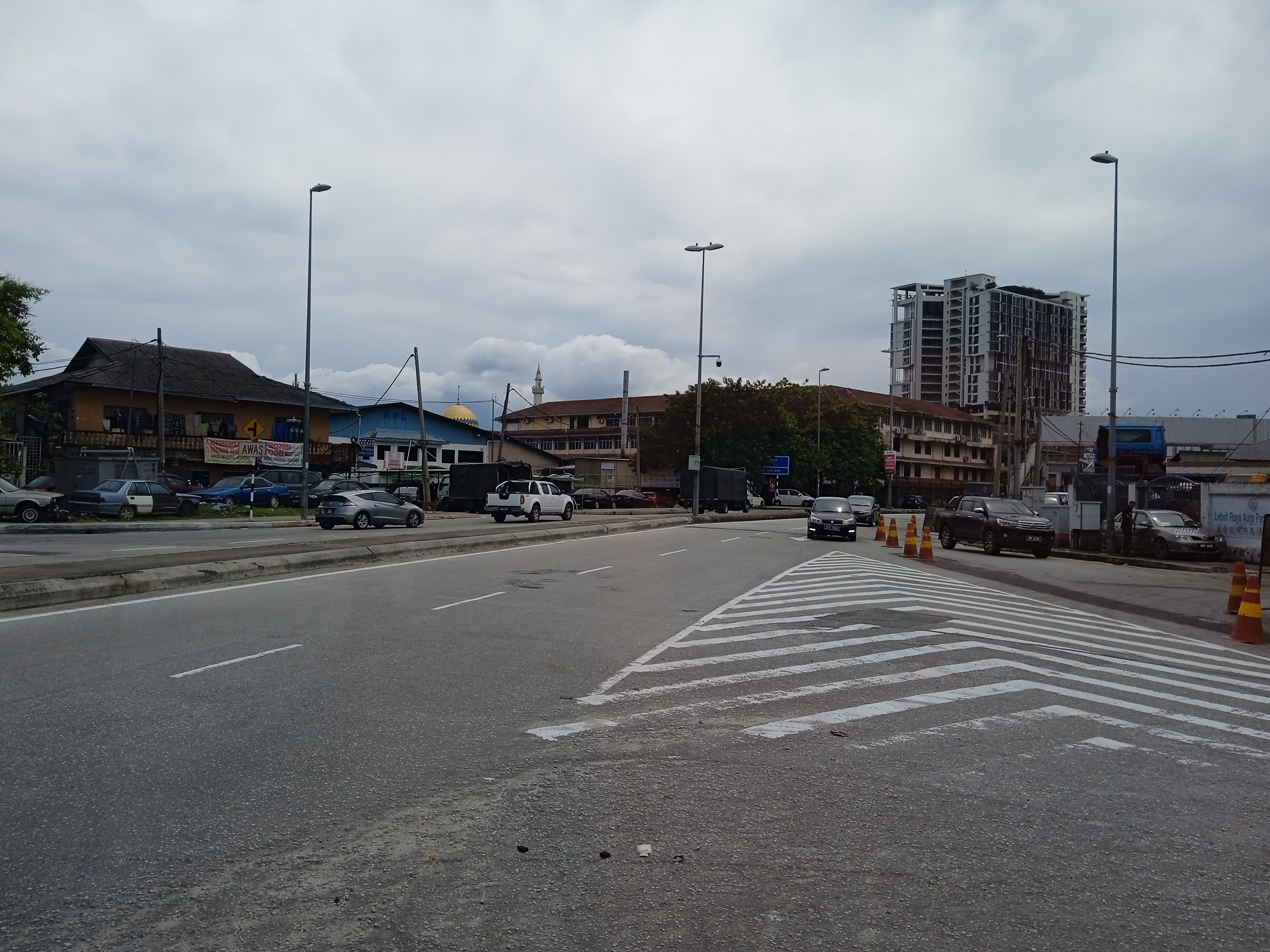

Major junctions
- Northwest end: Mont Kiara
- Jalan Desa Kiara; Jalan Lang Emas; Duta–Ulu Klang Expressway Duta–Ulu Klang Expressway; Segambut Bypass; Jalan Tuanku Abdul Halim (Jalan Duta)
- Southeast end: Segambut; Jalan Tuanku Abdul Halim (Jalan Duta)

Location
- Country: Malaysia
- Primary destinations: Segambut; Kepong

Highway system
- Highways in Malaysia; Expressways; Federal; State

Jalan Segambut is a major road in Kuala Lumpur, Malaysia. It is being expanded from a two-lane to a four-lane road leading to Segambut Dalam and Mont Kiara. The project was expected to complete in January 2013. Property prices along this road increased as a result of this project.

== List of junctions ==
km	Exit	Junctions	To	Remarks
		Mont Kiara	Jalan Desa Kiara West; Sri Hartamas; Sprint Expressway Sprint Expressway; Taman Tun Dr Ismail; Sungai Buloh; Ipoh East; Sprint Expressway Sprint Expressway; Damansara; Bangsar; Petaling Jaya; Seremban	T-junctions
		International Garden School		
		Mont Kiara Muslim Cemetery		
		Taman Prima Pelangi		
		Kampung Segambut Dalam		
		Bukit Segambut		
		Jalan Lang Emas	Northwest; Jalan Lang Emas; Kepong; Bandar Manjalara; Taman Bukit Maluri	T-junctions
		Kampung Melayu Segambut		
		Taman Segambut (SPPK)	Taman Segambut (SPPK); Kampung Segambut Tengah	T-junctions
		Segambut Komuter station KTM Komuter		T-junctions
		Segambut Ramp-DUKE Entry	Duta–Ulu Klang Expressway Duta–Ulu Klang Expressway East; Duta–Ulu Klang Expressway Duta–Sentul Pasar–Ulu Klang Link (Main Link); FT 28 Gombak; FT 28 Batu Caves; East Coast Expressway FT 2 AH141 Kuantan; East Coast Expressway FT 2 AH141 Genting Highlands; Duta–Ulu Klang Expressway Seremban; Duta–Ulu Klang Expressway KLCC; Duta–Ulu Klang Expressway City Centre; Duta–Ulu Klang Expressway Bulatan Pahang; Duta–Ulu Klang Expressway Sentul; FT 215 Jalan Semarak; Duta–Ulu Klang Expressway Setiawangsa; FT 28 Ulu Klang; FT 28 Ampang Northwest; Duta–Ulu Klang Expressway Sri Damansara Link; Segambut; Bandar Menjalara; Kepong; FT 54 Sungai Buloh Highway; Kuala Selangor; North–South Expressway Northern Route AH2 Ipoh; North–South Expressway Northern Route AH141 Klang; Damansara–Puchong Expressway Damansara–Puchong Expressway; Damansara–Puchong Expressway Desa Park City; Damansara–Puchong Expressway Damansara West; Duta–Ulu Klang Expressway Duta–Sentul Pasar–Ulu Klang Link (Main Link); North–South Expressway Northern Route AH2 Ipoh; Sprint Expressway Petaling Jaya	Y expressway interchange Ramp in from expressway
		Railway crossing bridge		
		Sungai Keroh bridge		
		Segambut Bypass	North; Segambut Bypass; Jinjang; Kepong	T-junctions
		Kampung Pasir Segambut		
		Taman Teh Wan Sang		
		Taman Goh Lim Huat		
		Segambut	Jalan Tuanku Abdul Halim (Jalan Duta) Northeast; Jalan Ipoh; City Centre South; Jalan Duta; Hentian Duta; North–South Expressway Northern Route AH141 New Klang Valley Expressway; Ipoh; Klang; Kuala Lumpur International Airport (KLIA); Johor Bahru	T-junctions
