= Malaysia Federal Route 215 =

Road in Malaysia

Federal Route 215
- Jalan Tengku Mohammad

Route information
- Length: 3.50 km (2.17 mi)

Major junctions
- Northwest end: Jalan Lapangan Terbang Sultan Mahmud
- FT 65 Jalan Lapangan Terbang Sultan Mahmud; FT 216 Jalan Tengku Omar; FT 65 Jalan Tengku Mizan
- Southwest end: Kampung Gelanggi

Location
- Country: Malaysia
- Primary destinations: Kuala Terengganu

Highway system
- Highways in Malaysia; Expressways; Federal; State

Jalan Tengku Mohammad, Federal Route 215 (formerly Terengganu state route T215), is a federal road in Kuala Nerus, Terengganu, Malaysia. The Kilometre Zero of the Federal Route 215 starts at Kampung Gelanggi junctions.

== Features ==
At most sections, the Federal Route 215 was built under the JKR R5 road standard, allowing maximum speed limit of up to 90 km/h.

== List of junctions and towns ==
Km	Exit	Junctions	To	Remarks
		Jalan Lapangan Terbang Sultan Mahmud	FT 65 Jalan Lapangan Terbang Sultan Mahmud Southwest; Gong Kedak; Penarik Northeast; Sultan Mahmud Airport	T-junctions
		Kompleks Sukan Negeri Kuala Terengganu	Sultan Mizan Zainal Abidin Stadium	T-junctions
		Jalan Tengku Omar	FT 216 Jalan Tengku Omar Southwest; Gong Kedak; Penarik Northeast; Seberang Takir	Junctions
		Kampung Tanjung Nangka		
		Kampung Tok Meng		
		Kampung Gelanggi		
FT 215; 0		Kampung Gelanggi	FT 65 Jalan Tengku Mizan Northwest; FT 3 AH18 Kota Bharu; FT 3 AH18 Besut; FT 3 AH18 Bandar Permaisuri (Setiu) Southeast; FT 65 Kuala Terengganu; FT 3 AH18 Marang	T-junctions
		Kampung Bukit Datu		
