= Malaysia Federal Route 285 =

Road in Malaysia

Federal Route 285
- Jalan Permaisuri–Bulatan Che Selamah

Route information
- Maintained by Malaysian Public Works Department
- Length: 9.545 km (5.931 mi)

Major junctions
- Southwest end: Bandar Permaisuri
- FT 3 Federal Route 3 FT 65 Federal Route 65
- Northeast end: Che Selamah Roundabout

Location
- Country: Malaysia
- Primary destinations: Batu Rakit, Merang, Penarik, Permaisuri

Highway system
- Highways in Malaysia; Expressways; Federal; State

Malaysia Federal Route 285, Jalan Permaisuri–Bulatan Che Selamah, or Jalan Merang (formerly Terengganu State Route T1), is a federal road in Terengganu, Malaysia. It connected to the Malaysia Federal Route 65 and Federal Route 3. This road is also called Jalan Pantai.

== History ==
On 30 March 2023, the Bandar Permaisuri–Che Selamah section is gazetted as Federal Route 285, while the remaining Che Selamah–Merang sections are gazetted as part of Federal Route 65 (formerly Federal Route 3685), alongside with entire sections of Federal Route 3864 and 3685.

== Features ==
At most sections, the Federal Route 285 was built under the JKR R5 road standard, allowing maximum speed limit of up to 90 km/h (56 mph).

There is no alternate route, and no section with motorcycle lanes.

== Junction lists ==
The entire route is located in Setiu District, Terengganu.

Legend:

- I/C - Interchange, I/S - Intersection, RSA - Rest and service area, OBR - Overhead bridge restaurant, R/R - Restaurant and rest plaza, L/B - Layby, V/P - Vista point, TN - tunnel, T/P - Toll plaza, BR - Bridge
- C - Cloverleaf, S - Stack, T-A - Trumpet-A, T-B - Trumpet-B, DT - Directional-T/Y, SDT - Semi-Directional-T/Y, P-Y - Partial-Y, D - Diamond, P-C - Partial cloverleaf, D-D - Diverging diamond, D-R - Direct ramp

Location	km	mi	Name	Destinations	Notes
Bandar Permaisuri			Bandar Permaisuri	FT 3 Malaysia Federal Route 3 – Rantau Panjang, Pasir Mas, Wakaf Baharu, Kota Bharu, Pasir Puteh, Jertih, Setiu, Kuala Nerus, Kuala Terengganu, Kuantan	Junctions
Bandar Permaisuri			Kmapung Tasik		
Bandar Permaisuri			Kampung Bukit Kemudu		
Bandar Permaisuri			Kampung Banggol		
Bandar Permaisuri			Kampung Permaisuri		
Bandar Permaisuri			Jalan Pantai; Che Selamah Roundabout	FT 65 Malaysia Federal Route 65 – Kampung Raja, Kuala Besut, Merang, Kuala Nerus, Kuala Terengganu	Roundabout
1.000 mi = 1.609 km; 1.000 km = 0.621 mi
