= Malaysia Federal Route 65 =

Road in Malaysia

Federal Route 65

Route information
- Maintained by Malaysian Public Works Department
- Length: 101.921 km (63.331 mi)

Major junctions
- North end: Sultan Mahmud Airport
- T143 State Route T143; FT 215 Federal Route 215 FT 3 / AH18 Federal Route 3
- South end: Bukit Besar

Location
- Country: Malaysia
- Primary destinations: Bandar Permaisuri, Kuala Terengganu

Highway system
- Highways in Malaysia; Expressways; Federal; State

Federal Route 65, comprising Tengku Mizan Road, Sultan Mahmud Airport Road, Tengku Ampuan Intan Zaharah Road and Kampung Raja–Kampung Che Selamah Road is a federal road in Terengganu, Malaysia.

== Overview ==
=== Jalan Lapangan Terbang Sultan Mahmud ===
Jalan Lapangan Terbang Sultan Mahmud is a federal road linking Wakaf Tembesu junctions until the Sultan Mahmud Airport at Seberang Takir.

=== Jalan Tengku Mizan ===
Jalan Tengku Mizan (formerly Terengganu State Route T4) is a major highway in Kuala Nerus and Kuala Terengganu, Terengganu, linking Bulatan to Bukit Besar.

=== Jalan Tengku Ampuan Intan Zaharah ===
Tengku Ampuan Intan Zaharah Road (formerly Federal Route 3685 and State Route T1) is a federal road linking Bulatan Roundabout to Che Selamah Roundabout.

=== Jalan Kampung Raja–Kampung Che Selamah ===
Jalan Kampung Raja–Kampung Che Selamah (formerly Federal Route 3684 and State Route T3) is a federal road linking Che Selamah Roundabout to Kampung Raja.

== Route background ==
The Kilometre Zero of the Federal Route 65 starts at Sultan Mahmud Airport junctions.

== History ==
On 30 March 2023, the Federal Route 3684 and 3685 are gazetted as Federal Route 65.

== Features ==
At most sections, the Federal Route 65 was built under the JKR R5 road standard, allowing maximum speed limit of up to 90 km/h (56 mph).

There is no alternate route, no overlap, and one section with motorcycle lanes: Jalan Tengku Mizan.

== Junction lists ==
The entire route is located in Kuala Nerus District, Terengganu.

Legend:

- I/C - Interchange, I/S - Intersection, RSA - Rest and service area, OBR - Overhead bridge restaurant, R/R - Restaurant and rest plaza, L/B - Layby, V/P - Vista point, TN - tunnel, T/P - Toll plaza, BR - Bridge
- C - Cloverleaf, S - Stack, T-A - Trumpet-A, T-B - Trumpet-B, DT - Directional-T/Y, SDT - Semi-Directional-T/Y, P-Y - Partial-Y, D - Diamond, P-C - Partial cloverleaf, D-D - Diverging diamond, D-R - Direct ramp

=== Main section ===
Location	km	mi	Exit	Name	Destinations	Notes
Che Selamah				Kampung Che Selamah; Che Selamah I/S	FT 285 Malaysia Federal Route 285 – Bandar Permaisuri, Jertih, Kota Bharu, Kuala Terengganu, Kuantan	Roundabout
Wakaf Tembesu			Che Selamah–Bulatan see also FT 65 (Tengku Ampuan Intan Zaharah Road)			
Wakaf Tembesu			Bulatan–Bukit Besar see also FT 65 (Jalan Tengku Mizan)			
1.000 mi = 1.609 km; 1.000 km = 0.621 mi: Concurrency terminus

=== Sultan Mahmud Airport Road ===
Location	km	mi	Exit	Name	Destinations	Notes
Sultan Mahmud Airport				Sultan Mahmud Airport	Sultan Mahmud Airport – Arrival/Departure	
Sultan Mahmud Airport	0.0	0.0	6512	Sultan Mahmud Airport I/S	T143 Jalan Tengku Ampuan Bariah – Seberang Takir, Kuala Terengganu	Roundabout
Wakaf Tembesu				TH Hotel and Convention Centre Terengganu	TH Hotel and Convention Centre Terengganu	
Wakaf Tembesu				Terengganu State Sports Complex	Terengganu State Sports Complex – Sultan Mizan Zainal Abidin Stadium, State Indoor Stadium, State Hockey Stadium	T-junctions
Wakaf Tembesu				Terengganu Motorcross Circuit	Terengganu Motorcross Circuit	
Wakaf Tembesu			6511	Jalan Tengku Mohammad I/S	FT 215 Malaysia Federal Route 215 – Kuala Terengganu	T-junctions
Wakaf Tembesu			6510	Wakaf Tembesu; Wakaf Tembesu I/S	FT 65 (Tengku Ampuan Intan Zaharah Road) – Penarik, Merang, Batu Rakit, Batu Rakit Beach	T-junctions
Wakaf Tembesu			Wakaf Tembesu–Bulatan see also FT 65 (Tengku Ampuan Intan Zaharah Road)			
Wakaf Tembesu			Bulatan–Bukit Besar see also FT 65 (Jalan Tengku Mizan)			
1.000 mi = 1.609 km; 1.000 km = 0.621 mi: Concurrency terminus
