= Jalan Penarik–Mangkuk =

Road in Malaysia

Route information
- Length: 8 km (5.0 mi)

Major junctions
- North end: Kampung Mangkuk
- FT 65 Tengku Ampuan Intan Zaharah Road
- South end: Penarik

Location
- Country: Malaysia
- Major cities: Penarik, Mangkuk

Highway system
- Highways in Malaysia; Expressways; Federal; State

The Jalan Penarik–Mangkuk is a major road between Kampung Penarik and Kampung Mangkuk in Terengganu, Malaysia. Kilometre zero is at Kampung Penarik.

== Junction list ==
The entire route is located in Setiu District, Terengganu.

Legend:

- I/C - Interchange, I/S - Intersection, RSA - Rest and service area, OBR - Overhead bridge restaurant, R/R - Restaurant and rest plaza, L/B - Layby, V/P - Vista point, TN - tunnel, T/P - Toll plaza, BR - Bridge
- C - Cloverleaf, S - Stack, T-A - Trumpet-A, T-B - Trumpet-B, DT - Directional-T/Y, SDT - Semi-Directional-T/Y, P-Y - Partial-Y, D - Diamond, P-C - Partial cloverleaf, D-D - Diverging diamond, D-R - Direct ramp

Km	Exit	Name	Destinations	Notes
0.0		Penarik	FT 65 Tengku Ampuan Intan Zaharah Road – Tasek, Kampung Raja, Bandar Permaisuri, Kota Bharu, Kuala Terengganu, Pantai Mangkuk, Pantai Rhu Sepuloh, Pantai Batu Rakit, Batu Rakit, Kuala Terengganu	Roundabout
		Kampung Penarik	Kampung Penarik – Masjid Kampung Penarik, Klinik Desa Kampung Penarik	
		Penarik Beach		Beach area
		SK Penarek	Sekolah Kebangsaan Penarek	School
1.0		Kampung Baru Penarik		Village
2.0		Kampung Mangkuk		Village
3.0	–	–		
		Mangkuk Beach		Beach
		Mangkuk		Dead end
		Setiu River estuary		
