= Pulau Sekati Bridge =

Bridge in Kuala Terengganu, Terengganu, Malaysia

Pulau Sekati Bridge Jambatan Pulau Sekati جمبتن ڤولاو سكاتي
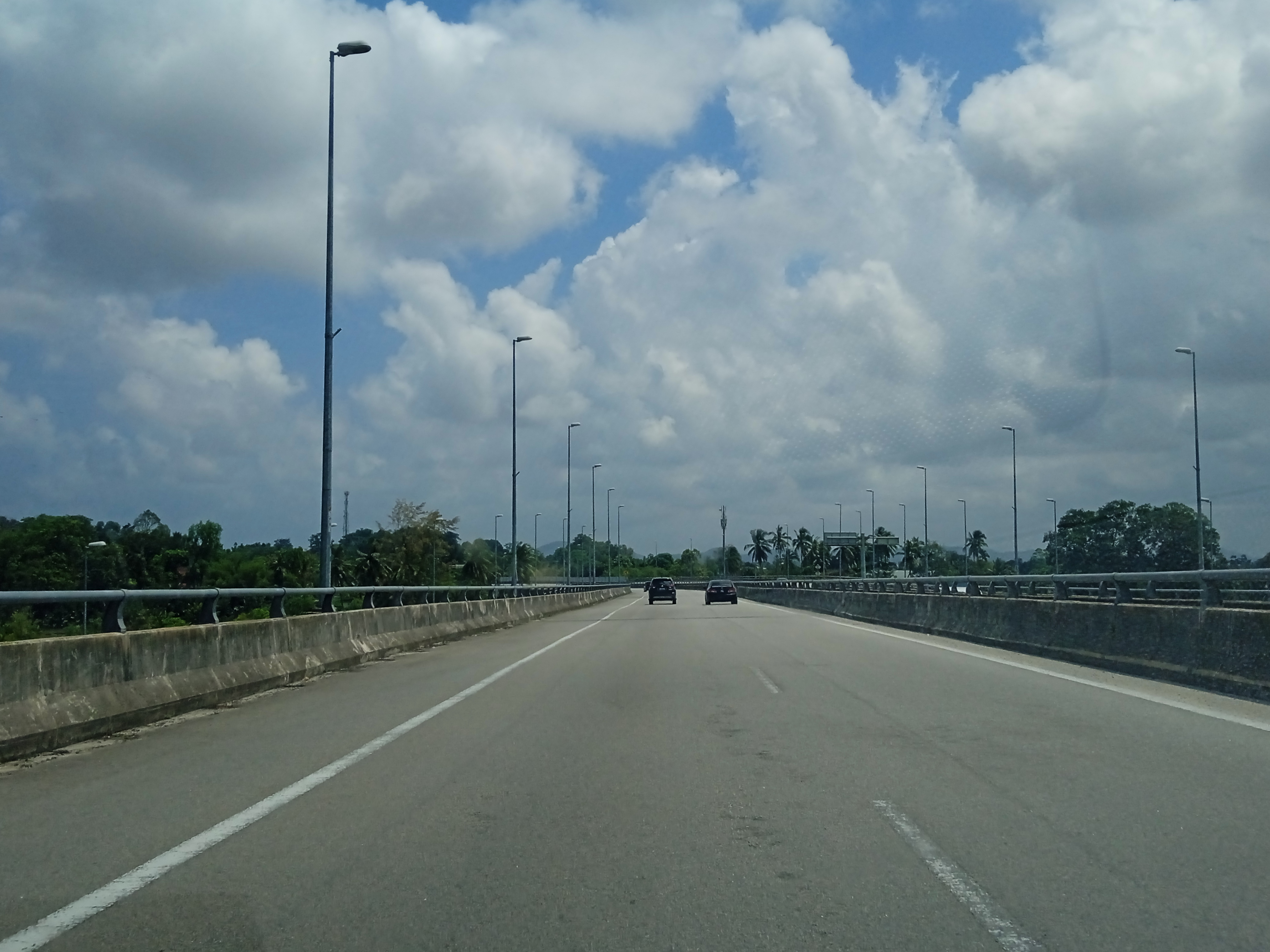
- Coordinates: 5°19′33″N 103°07′25″E
- Carries: Motor vehicles
- Crosses: Terengganu River
- Locale: Kuala Terengganu Bypass
- Maintained by: Malaysian Public Works Department (JKR) Kuala Nerus and Kuala Terengganu

Characteristics
- Design: box girder
- Width: --
- Longest span: --

History
- Designer: Government of Malaysia; Malaysian Public Works Department (JKR)
- Constructed by: Malaysian Public Works Department (JKR)
- Opened: 2017

Location
- Interactive map of Pulau Sekati Bridge

Pulau Sekati Bridge (Malay: Jambatan Pulau Sekati) is a bridge in Kuala Terengganu, Terengganu, Malaysia, which crosses Terengganu River. It is the longest bridge in Terengganu after Sultan Mahmud Bridge. Only the part of the bridge connecting Losong to Pulau Sekati has been opened to the public with the rest of the bridge connecting Jalan Banggul Tuan Muda to Jeram Tokong to be opened on 19 June.

== See also ==
- Sultan Mahmud Bridge
