= Tok Syeikh Duyong =

Famous and respected scholar

- Born: 1802; Cabang Tiga, Patani
- Died: February 24, 1889 (aged 86–87); Pulau Duyong, Terengganu, Malaysia
- Occupation: Scholar

Tok Syeikh Duyong or Syeikh (Scholar/Elder) Wan Abdullah bin (son of) Wan Muhammad Amin, mothered by Wan Aminah, was born in Cabang Tiga, Patani, now part of southern Thailand, in 1802 (1216 Hijri), migrated to Terengganu (now part of Malaysia) and died on Pulau Duyong at 4 p.m. on Thursday, February 24, 1889 (12 Jamadilakhir, 1306 Hijri). He was a famous and respected scholar, both by the palace and the people of the state of Terengganu.

He studied religion under Syeikh Abdul Qadir Bukit Bayas, Syeikh Daud alFatani, and in Mecca, while his students include Sultan Omar and Sultan Zainal Abidin III of Terengganu. He translated Minhaj atTalibin by Imam anNawawi and alUmm by Imam ashShafei, from Arabic to Malay.
