= Duyong Old Fort =

Historic traditional house in Malaysia

- Kota Lama Duyong (Malay); كوتا لاما دويوڠ (Malay)
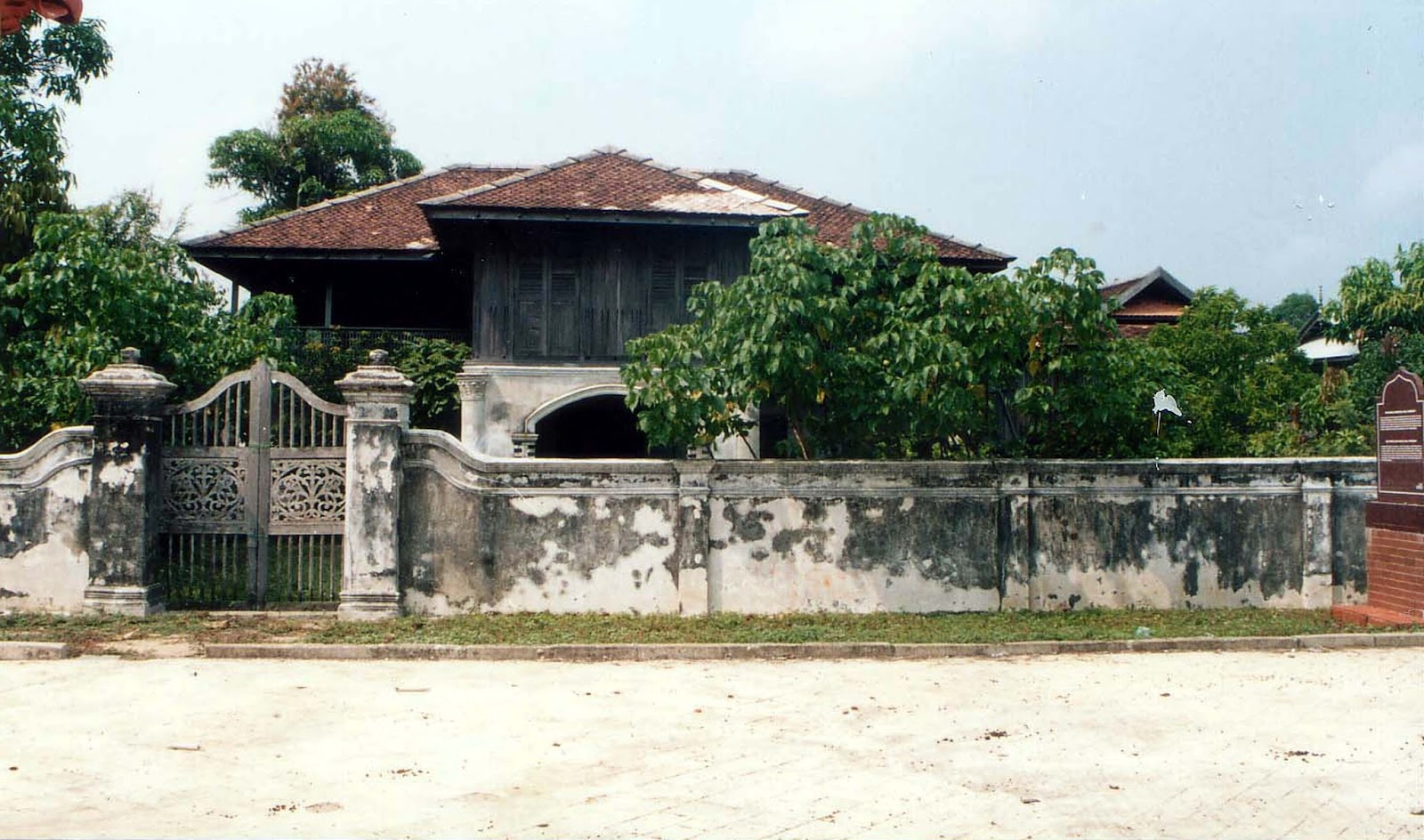
- Interactive map of Duyong Old Fort
- 5°20′10″N 103°07′38″E
- Location: Duyong Island, Kuala Terengganu, Terengganu

History
- Built: 1919

Site notes
- Area: 400 m^{2} (4,300 sq ft)
- Architectural styles: Corinthian, Egyptian Islamic, Traditional Malay
- Owner: Terengganu State Museum

Duyong Old Fort (Malay: Kota Lama Duyong) is a historical traditional house located in Duyong Island, which is about 7 km (4.3 mi) from downtown Kuala Terengganu, Terengganu, Malaysia. The Kota Lama Duyong house is described as a "fort" or Kota in Malay simply because it was surrounded by sturdy high brick walls.

== History ==
The house was built in 1919 by Dato' Biji Sura (Nik Muhamad bin Hitam), who was a former judge of the Terengganu state government. The house, measuring 400 square meters, was built with the help of Malay and Chinese craftsmen from Singapore. The main building materials were wood and bricks that adhered with a mixture of egg whites, sand, honey, small stones and clay, as a replacement for cement.

A reconstruction initiative by the Ministry of Culture and Arts of Malaysia was carried out in 1996 to rehabilitate the building which suffered severe damage caused by floods in 1986. The renovation project was completed in September 1999 without changing the original design.

Kota Lama Duyong now has been restored by the State as a unique attraction and also acts as a heritage museum and exhibition gallery under the auspices of the Terengganu State Museum, displaying local artifacts (such as old plates and dishes, brassware, and pottery) and becoming a historical proof of the development of Islam.

== Design ==
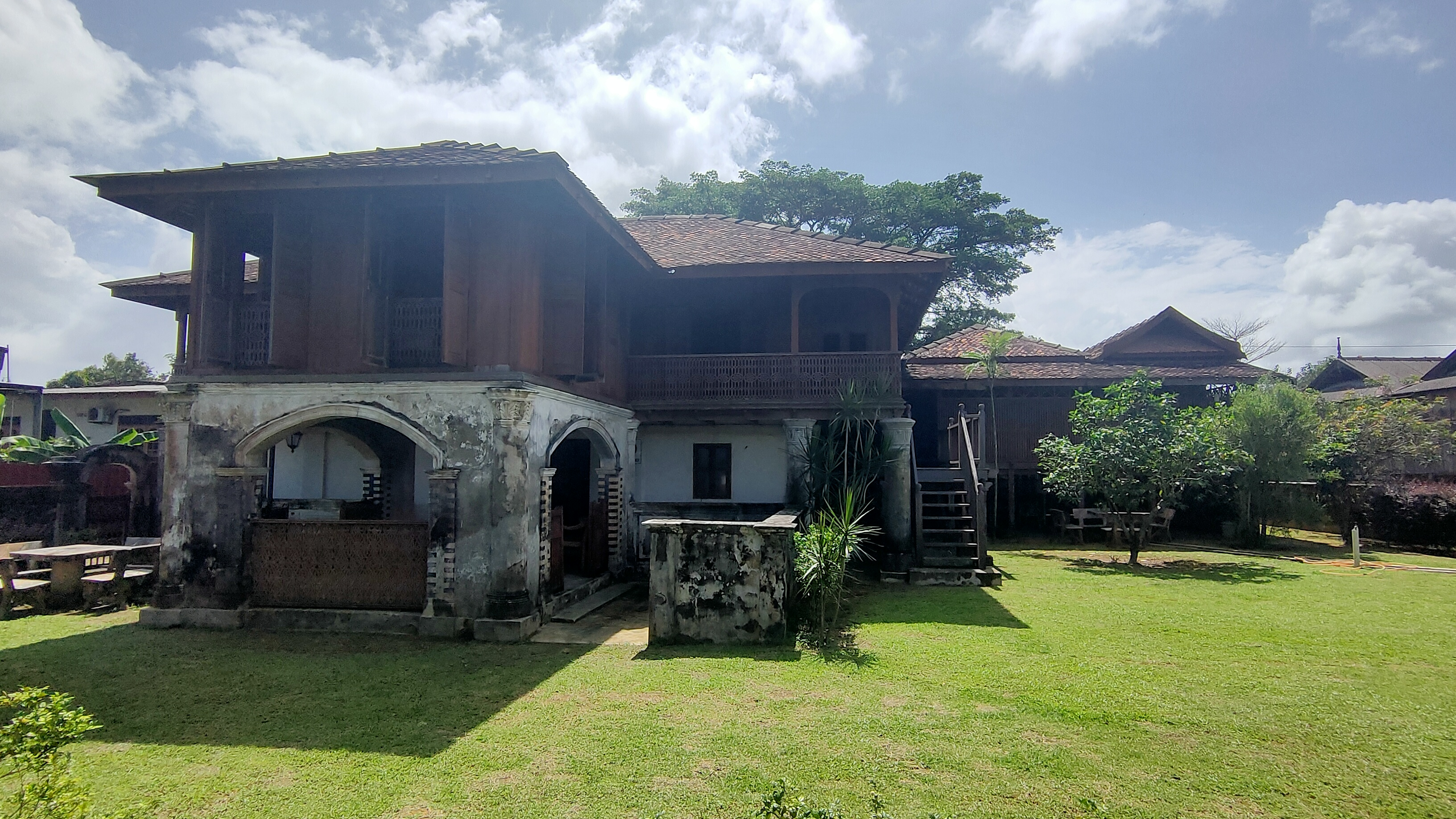
The front side of the building.

The fort actually consisted of houses in different traditional Malay styles such as Bujang Berepeleh, Lima Bungkus and Potong Belanda. All the houses have decorative sobek carvings on the veranda that give the buildings a traditional Malay look

Kota Lama Duyong has nine roofs that cover several sections that are connected to the kitchen, bathroom, veranda and a small bridge. The design, while resembling traditional Malay palaces, is made different because it uses elements of foreign architectural features such as Corinthian and Egyptian Islamic elements, especially at the poles and walls.
