= Segambut Bypass =

Road in Malaysia

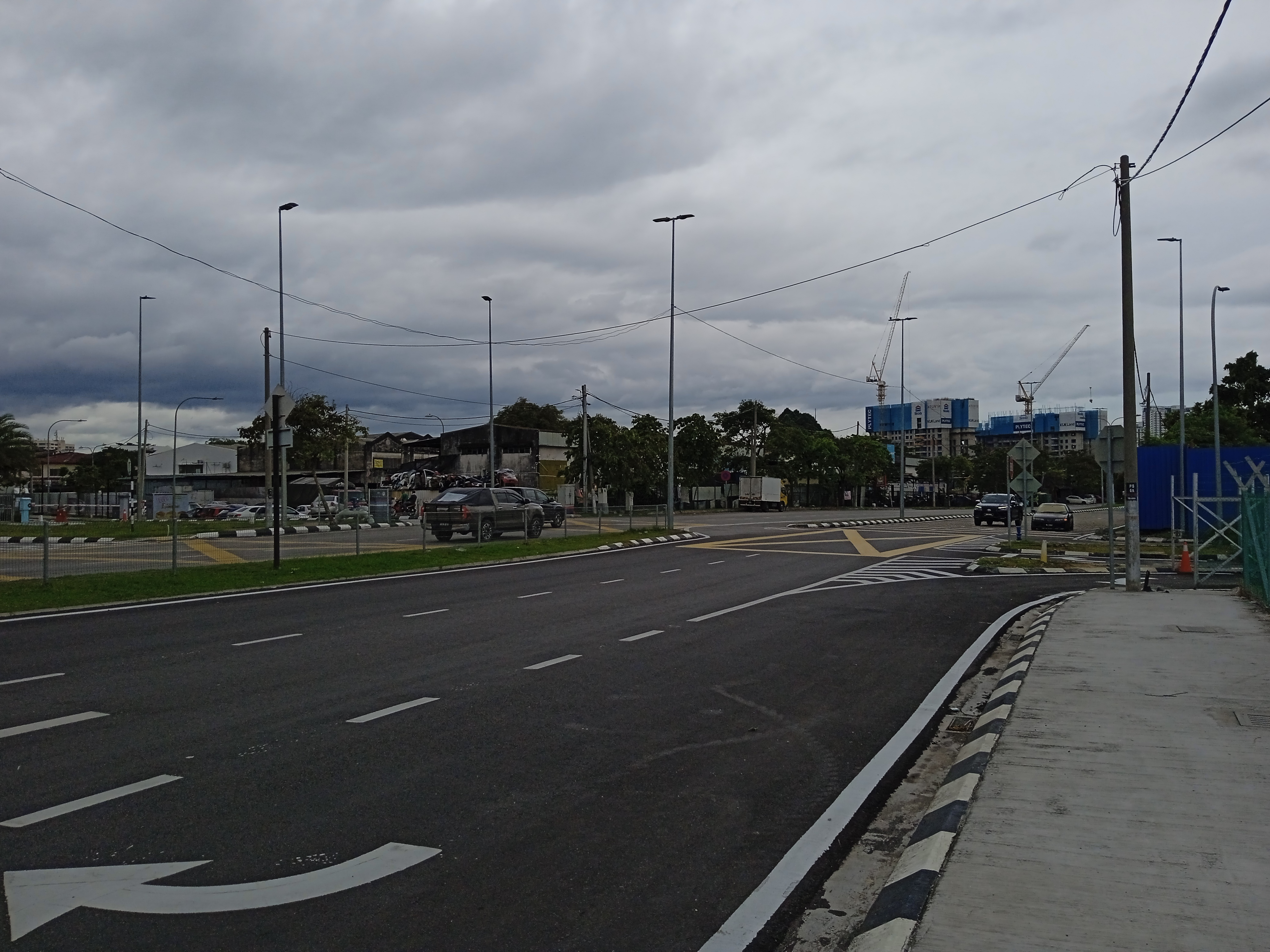

Major junctions
- West end: FT 54 Jalan Kepong junctions
- FT 54 Jalan Kepong; Jalan Segambut
- East end: Jalan Segambut

Location
- Country: Malaysia
- Primary destinations: Segambut

Highway system
- Highways in Malaysia; Expressways; Federal; State

Segambut Bypass is a major highway in Kuala Lumpur, Malaysia. This highway is maintained by the Kuala Lumpur City Hall.

== List of junctions ==
Km	Exit	Junctions	To	Remarks
		FT 54 Jalan Kepong	FT 54 Jalan Kepong West; FT 54 Kepong; FT 54 Sungai Buloh; FT 54 Kuala Selangor; B9 Shah Alam; Damansara–Puchong Expressway Petaling Jaya East; FT 54 Jinjang; FT 28 Batu Caves; East Coast Expressway FT 2 AH141 Kuantan; FT 1 City Centre	T-junctions
		Taman Jinjang Baru		
		Jinjang Pusat		
		Jinjang Selatan Tambahan		
		Taman Seri Segambut		
		Jalan 44/31b	West; Jalan 44/31b Kepong; Kepong Baru	T-junctions
		Taman Sejahtera		
		Kampung Pasir Segambut		
		Jalan Segambut	Jalan Segambut East Only; Segambut; Sentul; City Centre; Jalan Duta	Interchange
