= Seberang Takir =

Coordinates: 5°21′N 103°08′E

Seberang Takir (Jawi: سبرڠ تاكير) is a small town in Kuala Nerus District, Terengganu, Malaysia. The town consists of several fishing villages namely Kampung Baru Seberang Takir, Kampung Hulu Takir, Kampung Padang Takir, Kampung Batin and Kampung Seberang Takir itself.

== Attractions ==
Kuala Nerus side of Kuala Terengganu Drawbridge is located in Kampung Seberang Takir. Besides the bridge, the new mosque that is Masjid Kampung Seberang Takir is also located in the town and has become the main attraction in Seberang Takir. The parking lots near the Drawbridge is a famous food truck hotspot called Foodtruck Panoramik.
