= Sultan Mahmud Bridge =

Bridge in Kuala Terengganu, Terengganu, Malaysia

Sungai Terengganu Bridge Jambatan Sultan Mahmud جمبتن سلطان مهمود
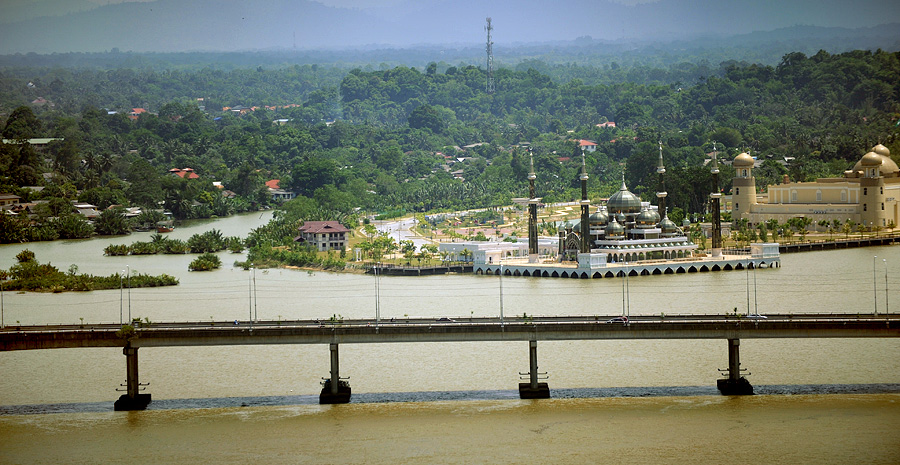
- Coordinates: 5°19′28″N 103°07′28″E
- Carries: Motor vehicles
- Crosses: Terengganu River
- Locale: Federal Route 65 Jalan Tengku Mizan, Kuala Terengganu
- Official name: Sultan Mahmud Bridge
- Maintained by: Malaysian Public Works Department (JKR) Kuala Terengganu

Characteristics
- Design: box girder
- Width: --
- Longest span: --

History
- Designer: Government of Malaysia; Malaysian Public Works Department (JKR)
- Constructed by: Malaysian Public Works Department (JKR)
- Opened: 1990

Location
- Interactive map of Sungai Terengganu Bridge

Sultan Mahmud Bridge or Jambatan Sultan Mahmud (Jawi: جمبتن سلطان مهمود) is a bridge in Kuala Terengganu, Terengganu, Malaysia, which crosses Terengganu River. Constructed in 1988, the bridge was officially opened by the late of Sultan of Terengganu, Sultan Mahmud Al-Muktafi Billah Shah on 11 March 1990. Toll collection for the bridge was abolished in 1999 by the then PAS state government in line with an election promise.

== Sultan Mahmud International Bridge Run ==
Sultan Mahmud Bridge
- Date: September
- Location: Kuala Terengganu, Terengganu, Malaysia
- Event type: Bridge
- Distance: Marathon
- Primary sponsor: Terengganu State Government
- Established: 1990-1999; 2013-present
- Website: Sultan Mahmud International Bridge Run

The Sultan Mahmud International Bridge Run is the annual bridge run that is held on September every year. It is organised by the Terengganu State Government, the Terengganu Amateur Athletic Association (POAT) and the Terengganu State Tourism Action Council (MTPNT).

== See also ==
- Jalan Tengku Mizan
- Federal Route 65
