= Batu Rakit =

Coordinates: 5°27′N 103°03′E

Batu Rakit in Kuala Nerus District

Batu Rakit (Jawi: باتو راكيت) is a mukim in Kuala Nerus District, Terengganu, Malaysia.
