= Kuala Terengganu District =

Kuala Terengganu District Kole Tranung (Terengganu Malay)
- District of Terengganu
- Daerah Kuala Terengganu
- Flag

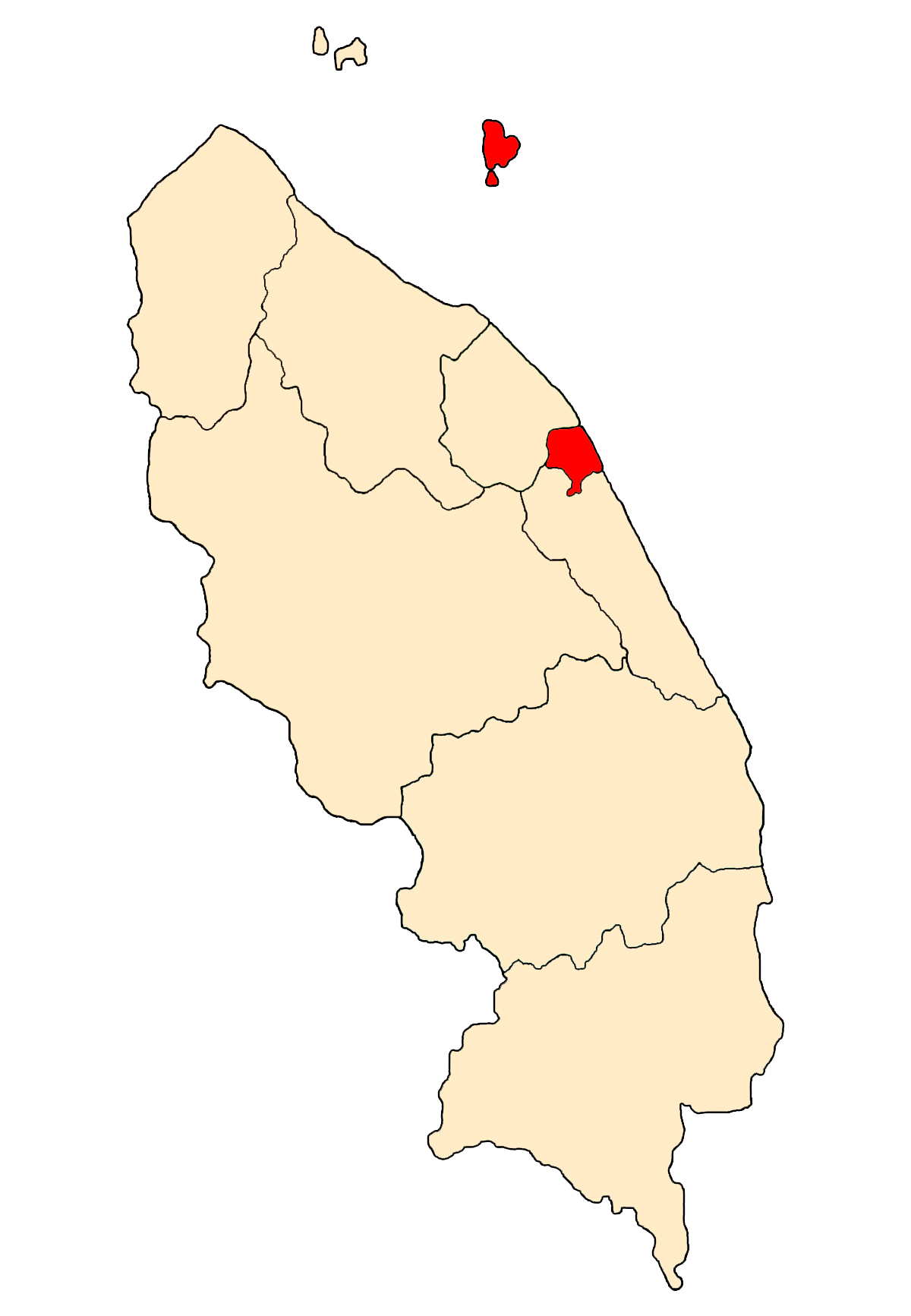
- Location of Kuala Terengganu District in Terengganu
- Interactive map of Kuala Terengganu District
- Location of Kuala Terengganu District in Malaysia
- Coordinates: 5°20′N 103°10′E
- Country: Malaysia
- State: Terengganu
- Seat: Kuala Terengganu
- Local area government(s): Kuala Terengganu City Council

Government
  - District officer: Azmi Razik

Area
  - Total: 210.21 km^{2} (81.16 sq mi)

Population (2010) (Contain Kuala Nerus District)
  - Total: 343,284
  - Estimate (2014): 184,600
  - Density: 1,633.1/km^{2} (4,229.6/sq mi)
- Time zone: UTC+8 (MST)
  - Summer (DST): UTC+8 (Not observed)
- Postcode: 21xxx
- Calling code: +6-09-6
- Vehicle registration plates: T

The Kuala Terengganu District (Terengganu Malay: Kole Tranung) is a district in the state of Terengganu, Malaysia. It covers an area of 210.21 square kilometres, and had a population of 343,284 at the 2010 Census . The district is bordered by Terengganu River which separates Kuala Nerus District in the north and west, Marang District in the south and South China Sea in the east. The capital of this district is Kuala Terengganu.

== Administrative divisions ==

Kuala Terengganu District is divided into 19 mukims, which are:

- Atas Tol
- Batu Buruk
- Belara
- Bukit Besar
- Cabang Tiga
- Cenering
- Gelugur Kedai
- Gelugur Raja
- Kepung
- Kuala Ibai
- Kubang Parit
- Losong
- Manir
- Paluh
- Pengadang Buluh
- River Islands
- Rengas
- Serada
- Tok Jamal

1 big town:

- Kuala Terengganu City Centre

And 1 small town:

- Cabang Tiga Town

== Demographics ==
Historical population
Year	Pop.	±%
1991	274,489	—
2000	298,304	+8.7%
2010	337,553	+13.2%
2020	229,780	−31.9%
Figures before 2014 includes Kuala Nerus District. Source:

== Federal Parliament and State Assembly Seats ==
List of Kuala Terengganu district representatives in the Federal Parliament (Dewan Rakyat)

Parliament	Seat Name	Member of Parliament	Party
P36	Kuala Terengganu	Ahmad Amzad Hashim	PN (PAS)

List of Kuala Terengganu district representatives in the State Legislative Assembly of Terengganu

Parliament	State	Seat Name	State Assemblyman	Party
P36	N13	Wakaf Mempelam	Wan Sukairi Wan Abdullah	PN (PAS)
P36	N14	Bandar	Ahmad Shah Muhamed	PN (PAS)
P36	N15	Ladang	Tengku Hassan Tengku Omar	PN (PAS)
P36	N16	Batu Buruk	Muhammad Khalil Abdul Hadi	PN (PAS)

== See also ==
- Districts of Malaysia
