= Bandar Permaisuri =

Coordinates: 5°31′N 102°45′E

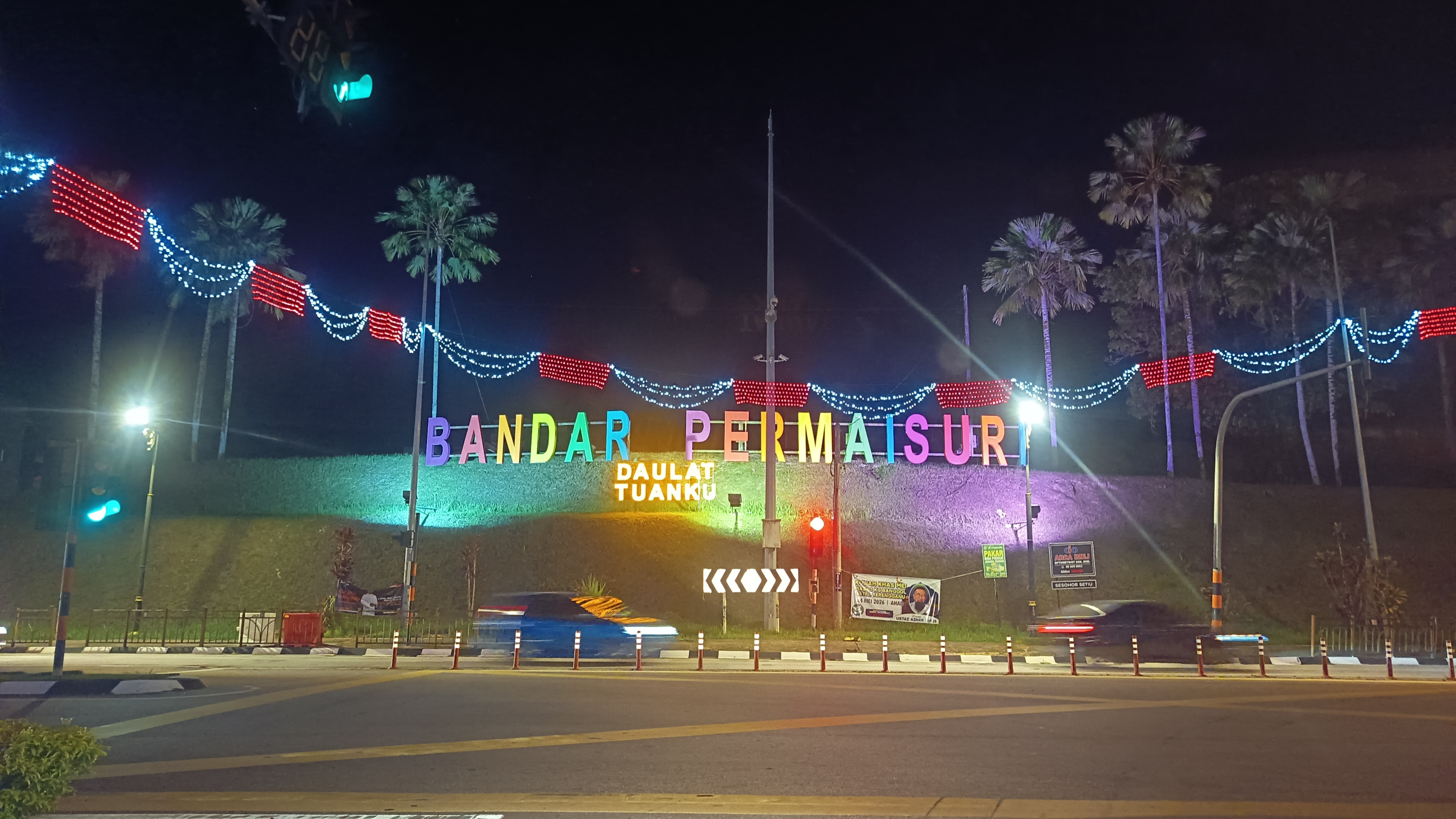
Bandar Permaisuri at nighttime

Bandar Permaisuri is a small town and the capital of Setiu District, Terengganu, Malaysia.

== Climate ==
Bandar Permaisuri has a tropical rainforest climate (Af) with heavy to very heavy rainfall year-round.

Climate data for Bandar Permaisuri
Month	Jan	Feb	Mar	Apr	May	Jun	Jul	Aug	Sep	Oct	Nov	Dec	Year
Mean daily maximum °C (°F)	28.3 (82.9)	29.3 (84.7)	30.7 (87.3)	31.9 (89.4)	32.2 (90.0)	31.9 (89.4)	31.4 (88.5)	31.2 (88.2)	31.0 (87.8)	30.4 (86.7)	29.3 (84.7)	28.4 (83.1)	30.5 (86.9)
Daily mean °C (°F)	25.2 (77.4)	25.8 (78.4)	26.6 (79.9)	27.6 (81.7)	27.9 (82.2)	27.6 (81.7)	27.1 (80.8)	27.1 (80.8)	26.9 (80.4)	26.6 (79.9)	26.2 (79.2)	25.5 (77.9)	26.7 (80.0)
Mean daily minimum °C (°F)	22.2 (72.0)	22.3 (72.1)	22.6 (72.7)	23.3 (73.9)	23.6 (74.5)	23.3 (73.9)	22.9 (73.2)	23.0 (73.4)	22.9 (73.2)	22.9 (73.2)	23.1 (73.6)	22.7 (72.9)	22.9 (73.2)
Average rainfall mm (inches)	324 (12.8)	147 (5.8)	135 (5.3)	100 (3.9)	161 (6.3)	184 (7.2)	172 (6.8)	229 (9.0)	276 (10.9)	329 (13.0)	540 (21.3)	659 (25.9)	3,256 (128.2)
Source: Climate-Data.org
