= Terengganu River =

River in Terengganu, Malaysia

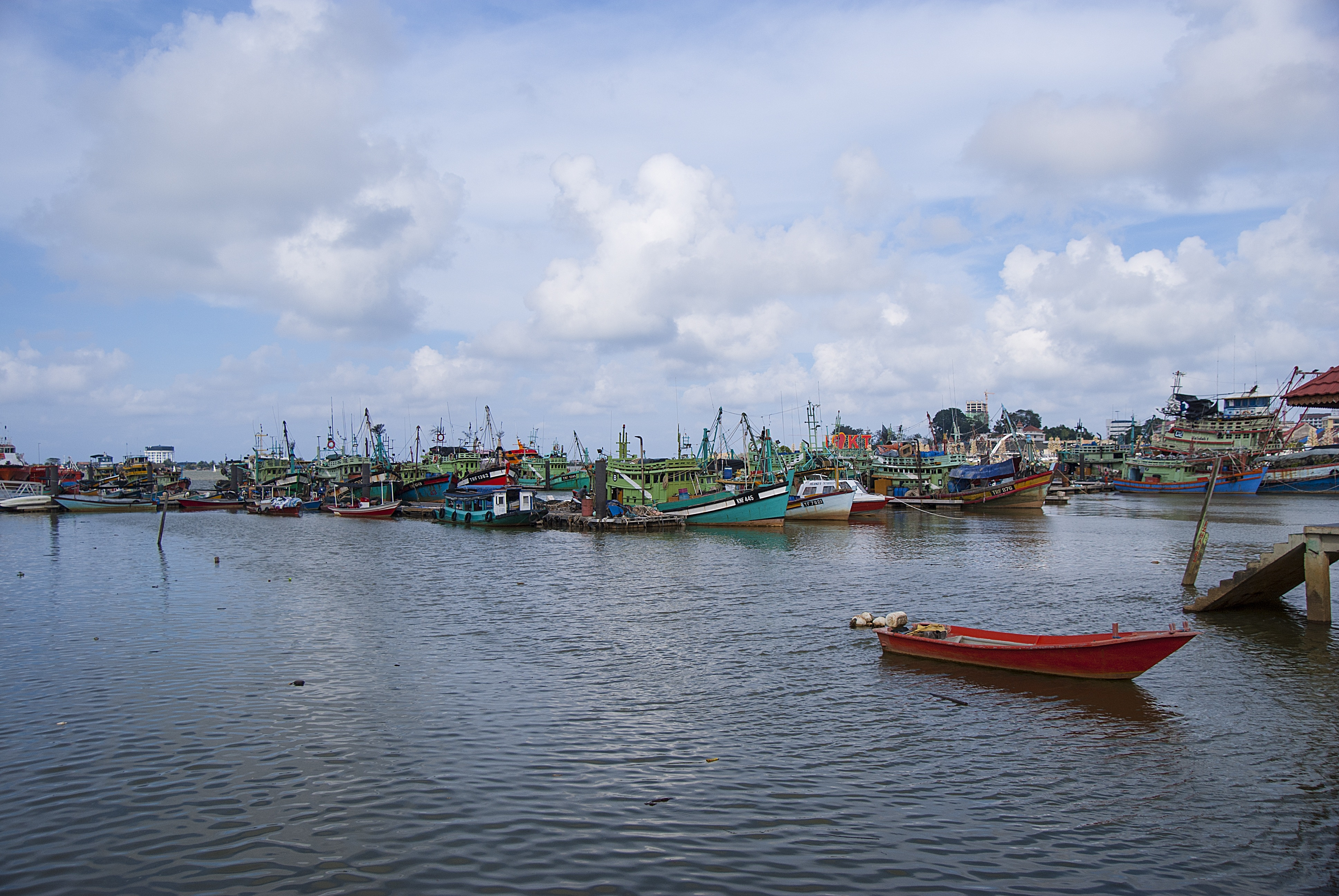
Terengganu River

The Terengganu River (Malay: Sungai Terengganu) is a river in Terengganu, Malaysia. Originated from Lake Kenyir, it flows through the state capital of Terengganu, Kuala Terengganu, and empties into the South China Sea. It is bridged by the Sultan Mahmud Bridge, Manir Bridge, Pulau Sekati Bridge and also the latest, Kuala Terengganu Drawbridge in Kuala Terengganu.

== See also ==
- List of rivers of Malaysia
