= Kuala Nerus District =

District in Terengganu, Malaysia

Kuala Nerus District Kole Neghuh (Terengganu Malay)
- District of Terengganu
- Daerah Kuala Nerus
- Flag
- Interactive map of Kuala Nerus District
- Location of Kuala Nerus District in Malaysia
- Coordinates: 5°20′N 103°00′E
- Country: Malaysia
- State: Terengganu
- Seat: Bandar Al-Wathiqu Billah
- Local area government(s): Kuala Terengganu City Council

Government
  - District officer: Haji Ariffin bin Abdullah

Area
  - Total: 397.52 km^{2} (153.48 sq mi)

Population
  - Estimate (2014): 173,800
- Time zone: UTC+8 (MST)
  - Summer (DST): UTC+8 (Not observed)
- Postcode: 213xx
- Calling code: +6-09-6
- Vehicle registration plates: T

Kuala Nerus (Terengganu Malay: Kole Neghuh) is a district in Terengganu, Malaysia. It is the youngest district in the state, having been declared a separate district in 2014. Formerly, it was part of Kuala Terengganu district (North Kuala Terengganu) but the district is still governed by Kuala Terengganu City Council (MBKT) which is one of the few city councils in Malaysia to govern two separate districts. Its capital is Kuala Nerus town, other major towns and villages include Gong Badak, Seberang Takir, Batu Rakit and Batu Enam, all of which are located within city limits of Kuala Terengganu. Kuala Nerus' population is 226,177 people as of 2015 which makes it the most populous district in Terengganu. The district has a total land area of 397.52 km^{2}.

== History ==
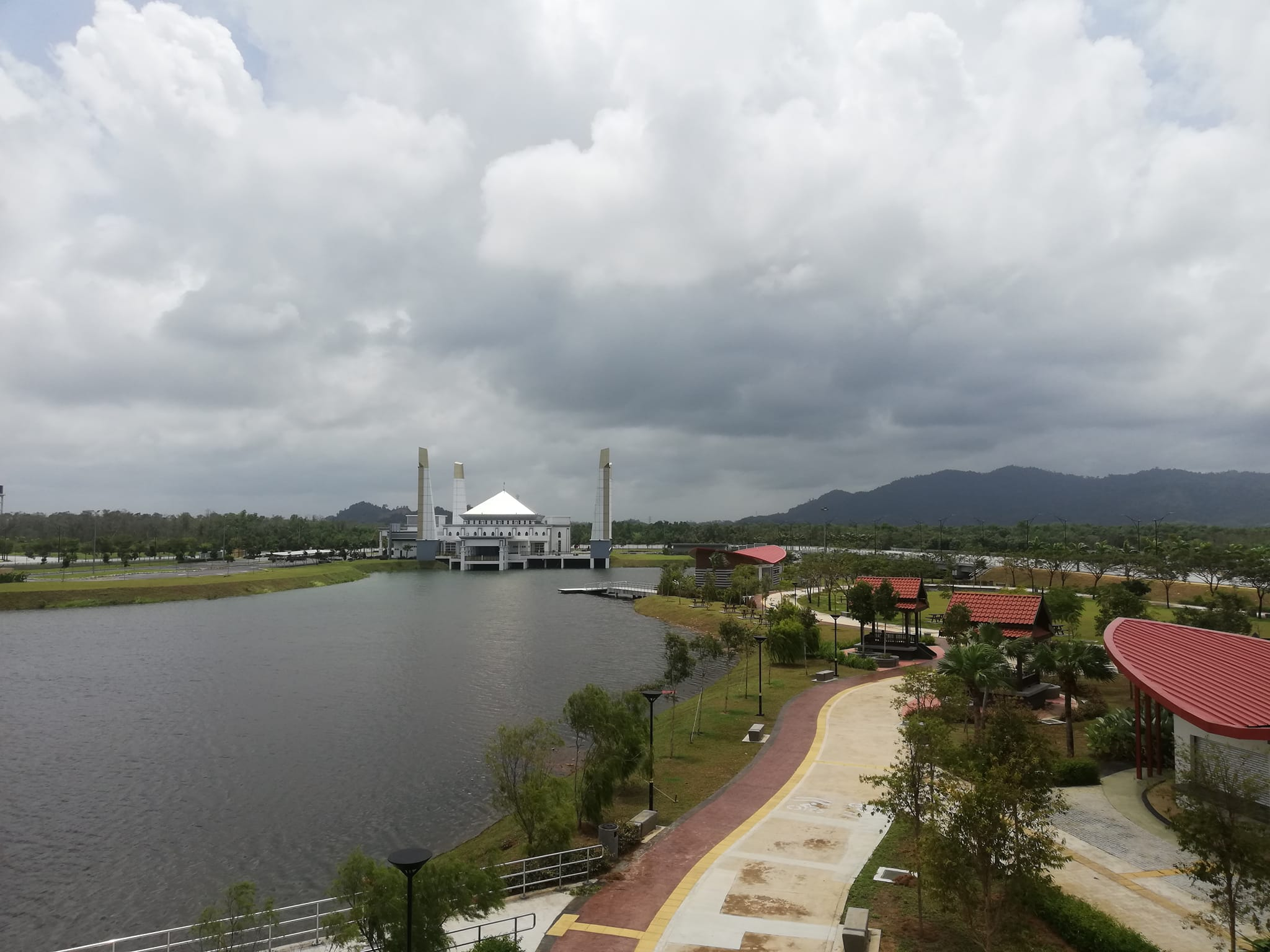
Bandar Al-Wathiqu Billah is the seat of Kuala Nerus district

This district, formerly a part of Kuala Terengganu District, was declared on 18 September 2014.

== Geography ==
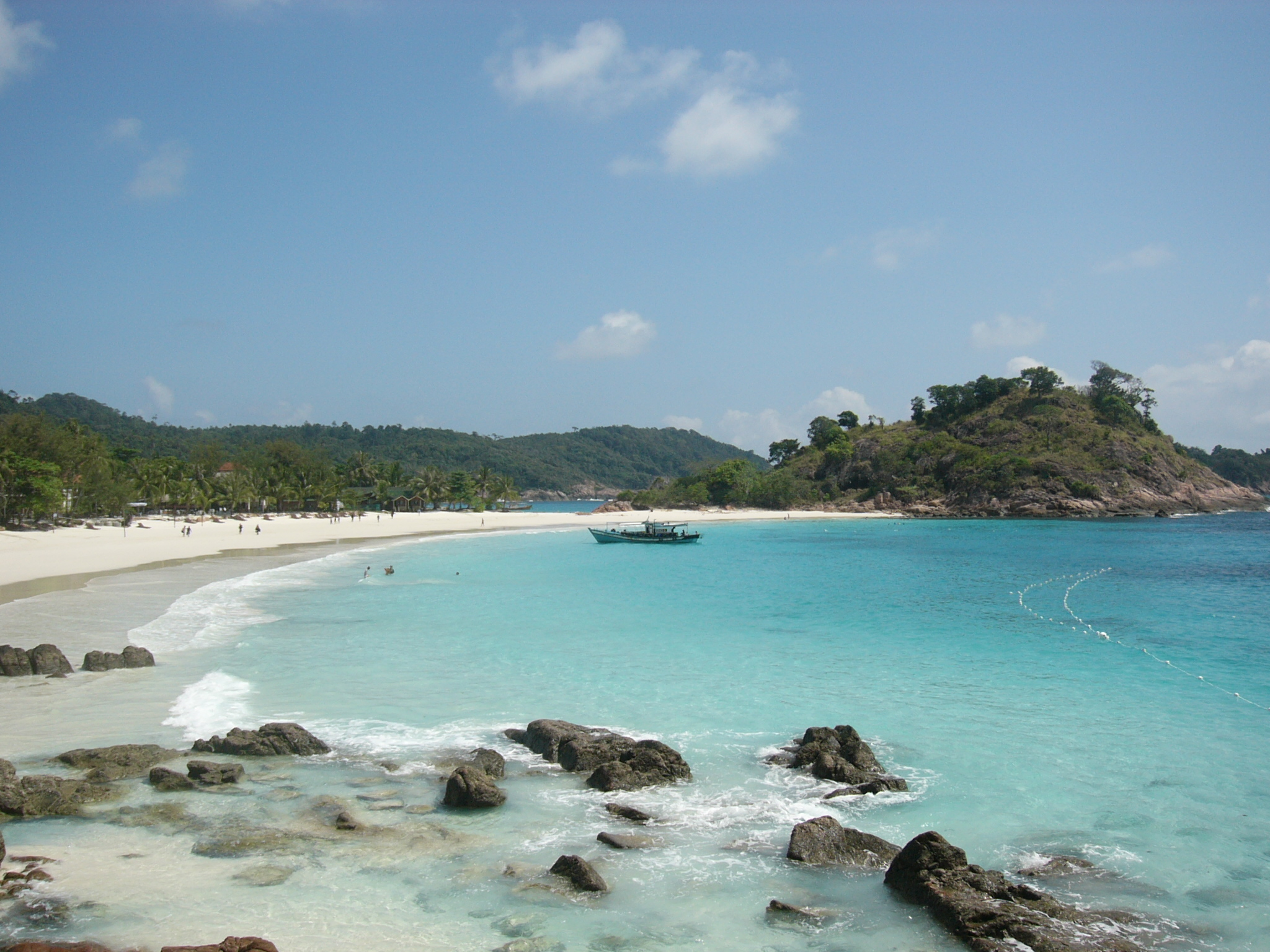
Pasir Panjang beach on Redang Island. It is one of the major tourist islands in the country.

The Redang archipelago is a group of islands in which two, the main island of Redang and Pinang Island, are inhabited, and the other smaller islands are not (Ling Island, Ekor Tebu Island, Lima Island, Paku Island, Paku Kecil Island, Kerengga Island, and Kerengga Kecil Island). The Redang Islands are located 45 kilometres away from Kuala Terengganu in the South China Sea. Together these islands contain around 500 species of corals and the thousands of fish and invertebrates. The islands are designated as a marine park in 1994. In Malaysia, a marine park is established to protect and manage the marine ecosystem and give people the opportunities to enjoy the underwater heritage. The Redang Islands are composed mainly of granite and sedimentary rocks that are metamorphosed. The main river is Redang River. Besides, Lang Tengah Island, Bidong Island, Geluk Island and Karah Island also under the jurisdiction of the district.

== Administrative divisions ==

Kuala Nerus district is divided into four mukims, which are:

- Batu Rakit
- Kuala Nerus Town
- Pakoh (Belara)
- Redang Islands

== Federal Parliament and State Assembly Seats ==
List of Kuala Nerus district representatives in the Federal Parliament (Dewan Rakyat)

Parliament	Seat Name	Member of Parliament	Party
P34	Setiu	Shaharizukirnain Abd. Kadir	PN (PAS)
P35	Kuala Nerus	Alias Razak	PN (PAS)
P38	Hulu Terengganu	Rosol Wahid	PN (BERSATU)

List of Kuala Nerus district representatives in the State Legislative Assembly of Terengganu

Parliament	State	Seat Name	State Assemblyman	Party
P34	N8	Batu Rakit	Mohd Shafizi Ismail	PN (PAS)
P35	N9	Tepuh	Hishamuddin Abdul Karim	PN (PAS)
P35	N10	Buluh Gading	Ridzuan Hashim	PN (PAS)
P35	N11	Seberang Takir	Khazan Che Mat	PN (BERSATU)
P35	N12	Bukit Tunggal	Zaharudin Zahid	PN (PAS)
P38	N22	Manir	Hilmi Harun	PN (PAS)

== Education ==
Significant development in the areas of higher education and housing projects have occurred there in contemporary times. Institutions of higher education include Universiti Malaysia Terengganu, the Institute of Teacher Education Dato Razali Ismail Campus and an industrial training institute. The Universiti Sultan Zainal Abidin (UniSZA) Teaching Hospital is also located in Kuala Nerus, along with its main campus.

== Sports ==
- Sultan Mizan Zainal Abidin Stadium

== Tourist attractions ==
Kuala Nerus has been described as a "popular tourist destination" by former Prime Minister Datuk Seri Najib Tun Razak.

Places of interest such as:

- Redang Island
- Dapo Pata (Beach Kitchen) at Tok Jembal Beach
- Ikan Celup Tepung (ICT) at Teluk Ketapang Beach, Mengabang Telipot Beach
- Famous Keropok Lekor along the way from Seberang Takir to Sultan Mahmud Airport
- Batu 6 Wet Market
- Pulau Duyong- famous traditional boat making place and marina Pulau Duyong
- Air Buah Gelas Besar Seberang Takir
- Gong Badak Sports Complex which includes Sultan Mizan Zainal Abidin Stadium - Home of Terengganu FA Football Team
- Pantai Tok Jembal

== Transportation ==
- Sultan Mahmud Airport

== See also ==
- Districts of Malaysia
