= Sultan Mahmud Airport =

Airport in Kuala Nerus, Terengganu, Malaysia

Sultan Mahmud Airport Lapangan Terbang Sultan Mahmud
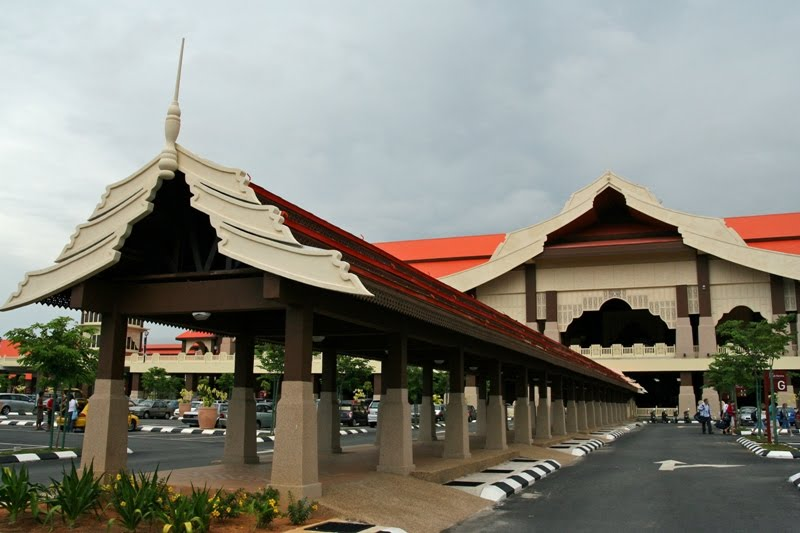
- IATA: TGG; ICAO: WMKN

Summary
- Airport type: Public
- Owner: Government of Malaysia
- Operator: Malaysia Airports Holdings Berhad
- Serves: Kuala Terengganu
- Location: Kuala Nerus, Terengganu, Malaysia
- Time zone: MST (UTC+08:00)
- Elevation AMSL: 21 ft (6.4 m)
- Coordinates: 05°22′53″N 103°06′17″E

Maps
- Terengganu state in Malaysia

- Location in Kuala Terengganu, Peninsular Malaysia TGG/WMKN (Malaysia) TGG/WMKN (Southeast Asia) TGG/WMKN (Asia)

Runways
Direction	Length		Surface
Direction	m	ft	Surface
04/22	3,480	11,417	Asphalt

Statistics (2018)
- Passenger: 894,737 (▼5.2%)
- Airfreight (tonnes): 363 (▲47.1%)
- Aircraft movements: 10,637 (▼7.4%)
- Source: official website AIP Malaysia

Sultan Mahmud Airport (IATA: TGG, ICAO: WMKN) is an airport in Kuala Nerus, Terengganu, Malaysia. The airport serves Kuala Terengganu which is located 8 km (5.0 mi) away. In 2017, it handled 943,660 passengers with 11,485 aircraft movements. It was named after the 16th Sultan of Terengganu, Almarhum Sultan Mahmud Al-Muktafi Billah Shah Ibni Almarhum Sultan Ismail Nasiruddin Shah, who ruled from 1979 to 1998.

The terminal was designed to handle 2 million passengers every year. Malaysia Airlines has agreed with Tabung Haji that it will also bring passengers to Mecca via Jeddah and Medina in Saudi Arabia.

== History ==
The expansion of the airport was part of the twenty development projects planned by the Terengganu state government and the federal government in 1984, with the expansion itself costing RM 400 million.

By 1988, the airport already had modern facilities along with four other airports in Malaysia.

In late 1991, Pelangi Air began operating three-times-a-week direct flights from Seletar Airport in Singapore to the airport using a Fokker 50 aircraft.

In July 1992, the Terengganu state government applied to the federal government for the expansion of the airport costing RM34 million, which included the building of a new terminal building and the extension of the airport runway. The expansion was also considered by the state government in 1993 when it wanted to allow international airlines to fly direct to the east coast part of the peninsular.

In October 2007, the Malaysian government approved RM200 million to upgrade the airport. This includes funding to extend the runway and upgrade the terminal of the airport.

On October 11, 2008, a Malaysia Airlines Boeing 747-400 from Kuala Lumpur landed there, the first Boeing 747 to do so.

== Airlines and destinations ==
Airlines	Destinations
AirAsia	Kuala Lumpur–International
Firefly	Kuala Lumpur–International, Kuala Lumpur–Subang
Malaysia Airlines	Kuala Lumpur–International

== Traffic and statistics ==
Annual passenger numbers and aircraft statistics
Year	Passengers handled	Passenger % change	Cargo (tonnes)	Cargo % Change	Aircraft movements	Aircraft % change
2003	394,240	Steady	160	Steady	5,508	Steady
2004	435,620	▲10.5	124	▼22.5	5,834	▲5.9
2005	419,475	▼3.7	94	▼24.2	5,622	▼3.6
2006	398,252	▼5.1	70	▼25.5	3,792	▼32.5
2007	430,800	▲8.2	47	▼32.8	8,781	▲131.6
2008	487,495	▲13.2	24	▼49.0	10,045	▲14.4
2009	523,619	▲7.4	24	Steady	9,875	▼1.7
2010	520,611	▼0.6	50	▲108.3	10,959	▲11.0
2011	502,966	▼3.4	103	▲106.0	14,296	▲30.4
2012	550,831	▲9.5	147	▲42.7	12,809	▼10.4
2013	699,310	▲27.0	103	▼29.7	11,402	▼11.0
2014	842,651	▲20.5	148	▲43.8	14,057	▲23.3
2015	857,239	▲1.7	329	▲121.9	12,587	▼10.5
2016	900,218	▲5.0	253	▼23.1	12,066	▼4.1
2017	943,660	▲4.8	247	▼2.4	11,485	▼4.8
2018	894,737	▼5.2	363	▲47.1	10,637	▼7.4
2019	913,829	▲2.1	427	▲47.1	11,072	▲4.1
2020	302,280	▼66.9	173	▼59.4	5,519	▼50.2
^{Source: Malaysia Airports Holdings Berhad}

Busiest flights out of Sultan Mahmud Airport by frequency
Rank	Destinations	Frequency (weekly)	Airlines	Note
1	Subang, Selangor	33	FY, OD	
2	Kuala Lumpur	26	AK, MH	
3	Sabah	2	AK	

== See also ==
- List of airports in Malaysia
- List of the busiest airports in Malaysia
