= Pekan, Pahang =

Town in Pahang, Malaysia

Pekan
- Royal capital and district capital
- Pekan, The Royal Town; Pekan Bandar Diraja
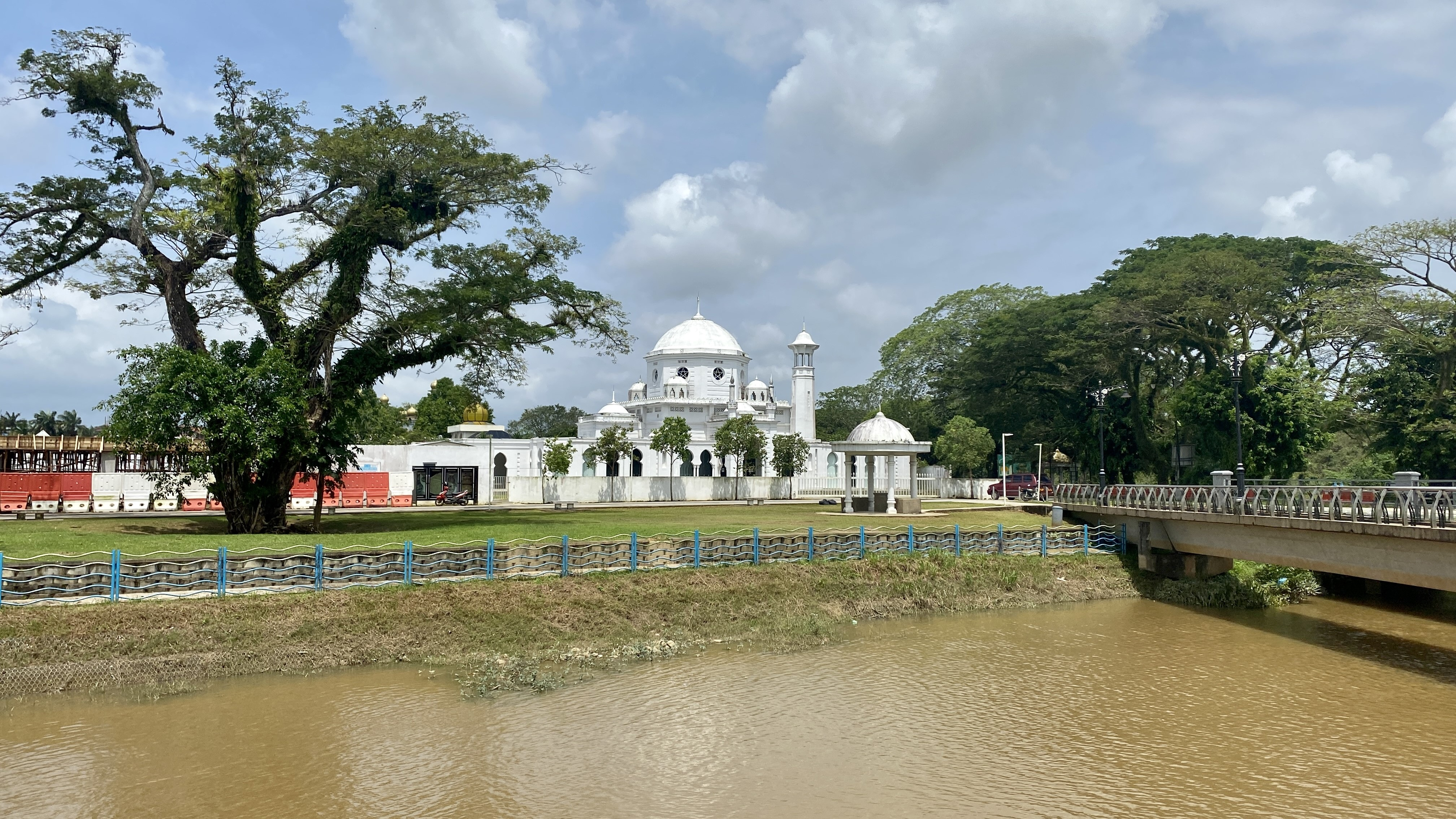
- Sultan Abdullah Mosque
- Interactive map of Pekan
- Pekan in Pahang Pekan (Malaysia) Pekan (Southeast Asia) Pekan (Asia)
- Coordinates: 3°30′N 103°25′E
- Country: Malaysia
- State: Pahang
- District: Pekan
- Founded: 5th century
- Granted municipality status: 23 July 2023

Government
  - Body: Pekan Municipal Council
  - President: Rose Samsul Abdul Razak

Area (MDP area)
  - Total: 2,351.8 km^{2} (908.0 sq mi)

Population (2010)
  - Total: 103,839
  - Density: 44.153/km^{2} (114.36/sq mi)
- Postcode: 26xxx
- MP: Sh Mohmed Puzi Sh Ali

Pekan is a town in Pekan District, Pahang, Malaysia, and the royal capital of Pahang. Its name comes from a flower, the Bunga Pekan. Pekan is also the name of the district the town is situated in, and a parliamentary constituency in its own right. It is the home of the state's royal family headed by Sultan Abdullah of Pahang. It is also the hometown of the second Prime Minister of Malaysia, Tun Abdul Razak Hussein, and his son, sixth prime minister Datuk Seri Najib Razak. Both were Pekan's Member of Parliament.

The Masjid Abdullah, a landmark in Pekan which dates from the 1920s, and the newer Abu Bakar Royal Mosque is near the Sultan Abu Bakar Museum. The stretch by the river bank from the Abu Bakar Royal Mosque heading towards the Sultan Abu Bakar Museum is Pekan's Heritage Route.

== History ==
According to local lore, a flowering plant named Bunga Pekan used to grow wild along the banks of Pahang River, and the town was named after it. The flower is said to be white like jasmine, although the particular plant species is also said to have become extinct. The river at the Pekan town (near Mengkasar village) is also called Pekan River, however there is no evidence that Pekan derived its name from this river. Other sources say the name "Pekan" came from "Pekan Sehari" (Pekan Sehari or Sunday Market still exists today), and the word "Sehari" was eventually omitted and the locals simply called it "Pekan".

Pekan is thought to have existed since the Old Pahang Kingdom. The old name was Inderapura, although it was also commonly known by the short form 'Pura', which some Malays called Pekan. The old capital was located on both the left and right banks of Sungai Pahang and Sungai Pahang Tua, up to Tanjung Langgar. The town was divided into Pekan Baharu and Pekan Lama (New and Old Pekan), and Pekan Baharu was formerly known as Kampung Cina. Several Arab and Chinese writers mentioned Pekan.

During the late 19th century, relations between the sultan and local villagers were close. For example, when a gong in the palace was struck, local villagers would assemble there for the sultan's service, such as accompanying him on a hunting expedition.

The villagers of Kampong Mengkasar, about one kilometre from Pekan towards Kuantan, are said to be direct descendants of Tok Tuan from Makassar in Sulawesi, Indonesia. Among the well-known figures, Tun Abdul Razak was recognised as having a Sulawesi heritage.

== Transport ==
=== Car ===
From Kuantan, Pekan is accessible by 3 routes, namely Tanjung Lumpur Highway (Federal Route 183) which runs through Tanjung Lumpur, Penor and Ceruk Paloh, Jalan Pekan (Federal Route 3 and AH18) and also through Gambang, Pahang by Tun Razak Highway (Federal Route 12). From Kuala Lumpur, one may travel to Pekan by the East Coast Expressway, exiting at the Gambang Interchange to the Tun Razak Highway. From Johor, a scenic coastal road passes through Kuala Rompin. Alternatively, the Tun Razak Highway can be taken, which links Segamat and Kuantan.

=== Public transport ===
The BAS.MY Kuantan bus route C40 connects Pekan to Kuantan.

== Places of interest ==
=== Sultan Abu Bakar Museum ===
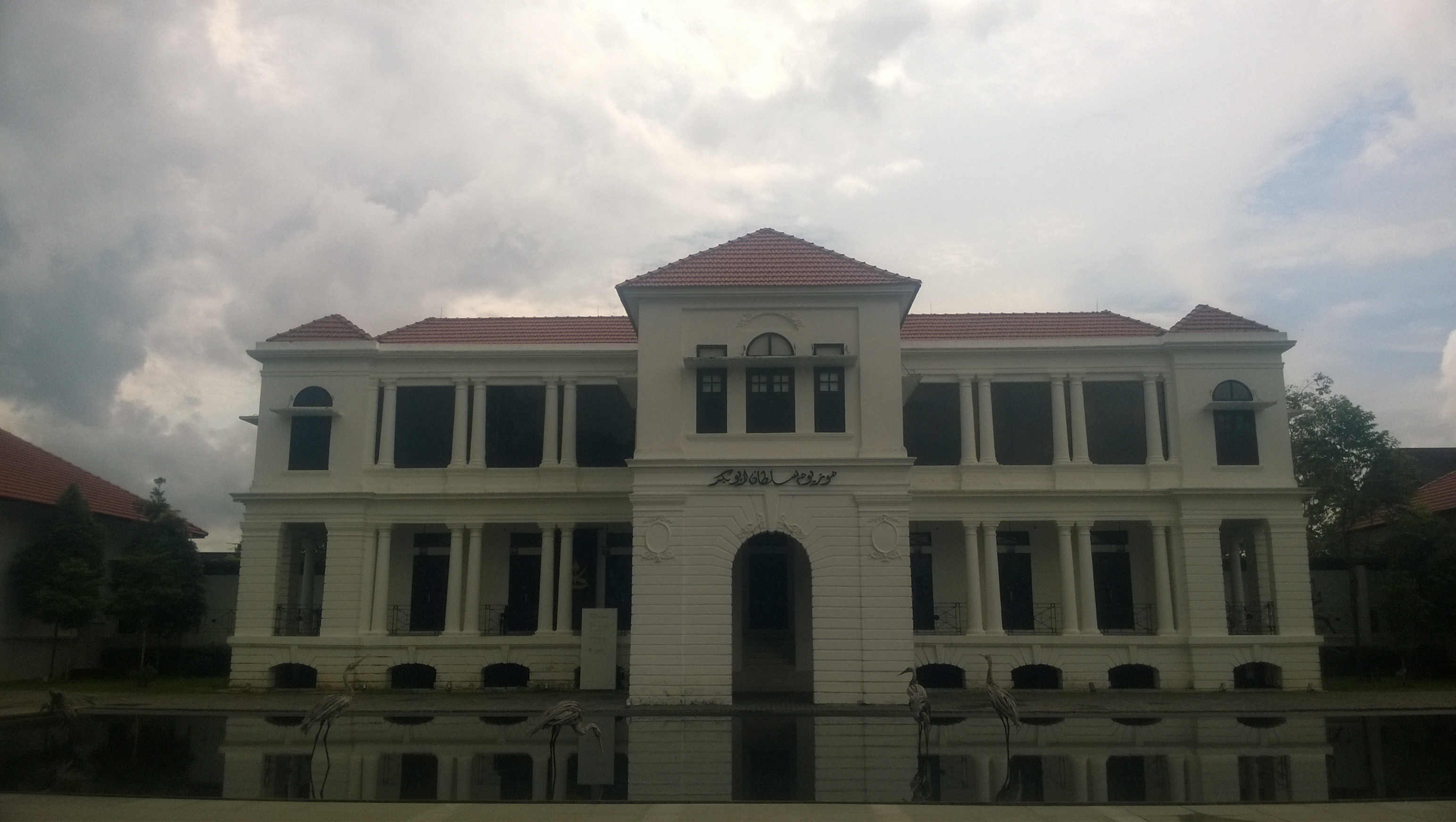
Sultan Abu Bakar Museum.

The Sultan Abu Bakar Museum displays many artefacts which are important in the state's history and the local Malay culture. The museum was officially opened by Sultan Ahmad Shah in October 1976. It is located in the former residence of the British Resident, which was built in 1929. It was acquired by the Sultan of Pahang in 1948 and was renamed Kota Beram Palace. In 1965, the Sultan moved his residence to a new palace (the Abu Bakar Palace), where the current Royal Palace is situated.

The museum was officially opened to the public in October 1976, in conjunction with the birthday celebrations of the Sultan of Pahang. The first chairman of the museum was the late YBhg. Dato' Haji Mohd Mokhtar bin Haji Daud, and the first director/curator was YBhg. Dato' Mohamed Mokhtar bin Haji Abu Bakar. The museum expanded its collections of artefacts very actively during this era up to 1997. The locals eagerly surrendered and provided as gifts certain unique artefacts to the museum. One example of these is a keris (a type of Malay dagger) which was found by a young man in a river about 20 km from the town of Pekan. This particular keris drew a lot of attention, coupled with strange stories of its mystical prowess. The keris is still on display at the museum. The museum has dedicated galleries focusing on water transportation, personal belongings of the late Sultan Abu Bakar and the late Tengku Ampuan Pahang Tengku Afzan.

As of October 2008, the museum has been undergoing renovations. Visitors are advised to call the museum first for more information.

=== The Chiefs' Rest House ===
Pekan is home to the Chiefs' Rest House. This wooden structure was completed in 1926 and is featured in the 'Lonely Planet' Travel Guide as a must-visit site in Pekan. It was originally built by the British as a guest house for the Chieftains in Pahang who visited Pekan to attend meetings and events at the Istana. Until today, the Chiefs' Rest House offers good, clean and reasonable accommodation to travellers.

Most of the furnitures adorning this building were brought over from the Istana. It is advisable to reserve your room in advance, as it can be packed during school holidays, weekends and whenever there are functions in the Istana. The Chiefs' Rest House is located along Jalan Istana Abu Bakar in Pekan. It is along the road approaching the Istana area.

=== Other places of interest ===
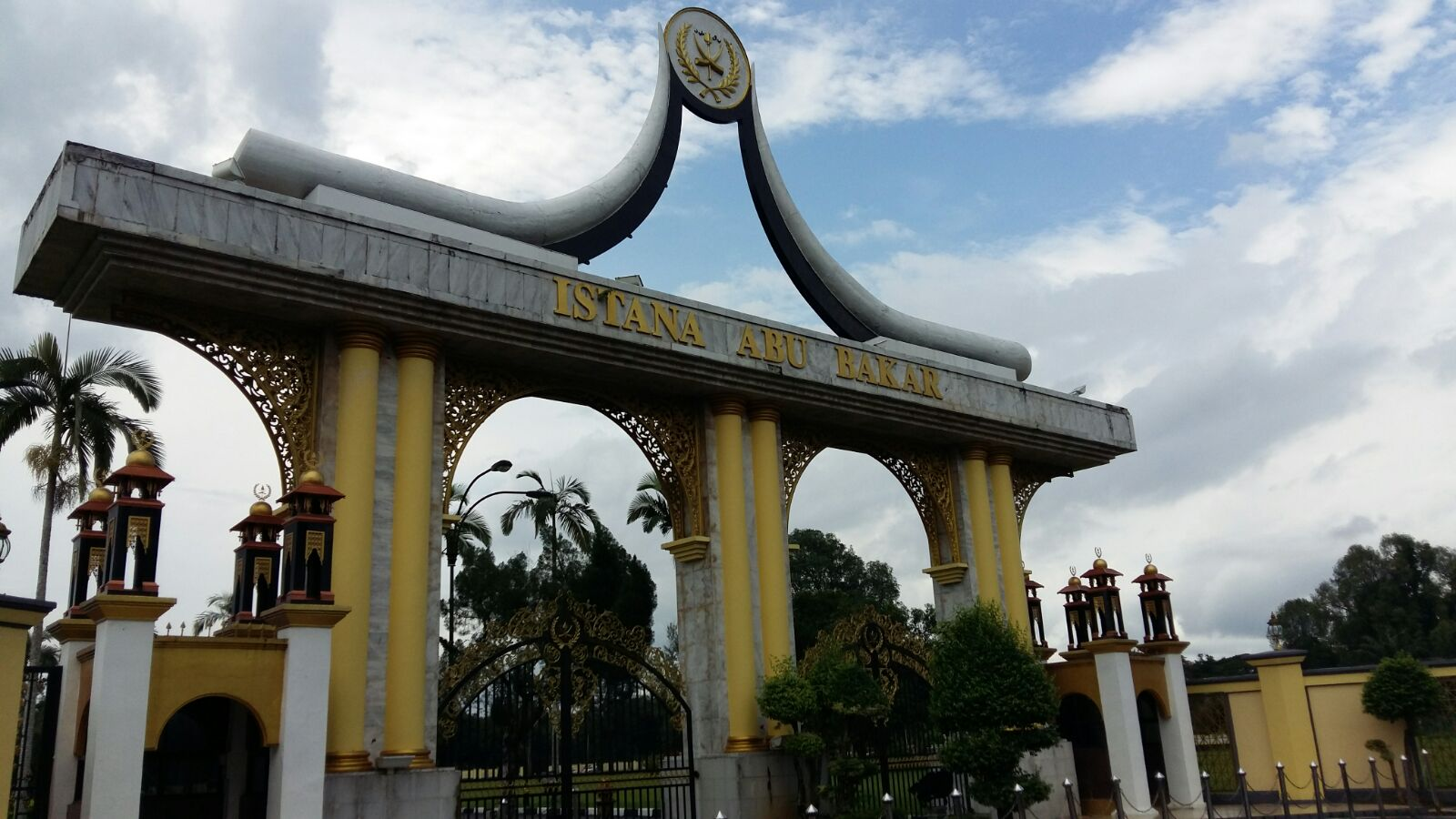
Abu Bakar Palace main gate.

Other places of interest include the Royal Palace (the Sultan Abu Bakar Palace), Sultan Haji Ahmad Shah Mosque, Royal Mausoleum, the Royal Pahang Polo Field nearby the Palace, the Royal Pekan Golf Club, birth house of late Tun Abdul Razak at Kampung Pulau Keladi and the Pahang Royal Silk Weaving Centre.

Kuliah Sultan Abu Bakar (the Sultan Abu Bakar Kulliyyah) is an Islamic college located nearby. Its alumni include scholars from Pahang and elsewhere in Malaysia. Its students consistently further their studies at Al-Azhar University in Cairo, Egypt.

Pekan is 15 minutes from clean, sandy beaches. North on the way to Kuantan, there is Pantai Legenda (Lagenda Beach), which features a golf course. South on the way to Kuala Rompin is the Pantai Batu 16 (the 16th Mile Beach), which used to have a royal retreat complex.

A one-hour drive from Pekan is Lake Chini, a beautiful freshwater lake which is one of the largest in Malaysia. It features a resort with restaurant, jungle trekking paths and a boat station. Boat trips are available by various routes around the lake. Prices differ according to the chosen routes (duration of boat trip from 45 minutes to 3 hours). There are also Orang Asli (natives) settlements nearby providing a hands-on experience of their living culture.

Pekan is also the location of one of the permanent campuses of Universiti Malaysia Pahang Al-Sultan Abdullah (UMPSA).

Pekan Lama. Pekan Lama means Old Pekan. It is situated on the banks of Sungai Parit which flows to Sungai Pekan. Early settlement of shops first started in this area. The original wooden structure of these shops can still be seen until today around Pekan Lama. Istana Pantai was once located here, but it is no longer around and the site is now occupied by the Majlis Agama Islam Daerah Pekan building. Bangunan UMNO Pekan Lama is situated nearby and had been on that site since the 1960s.

== Industries ==
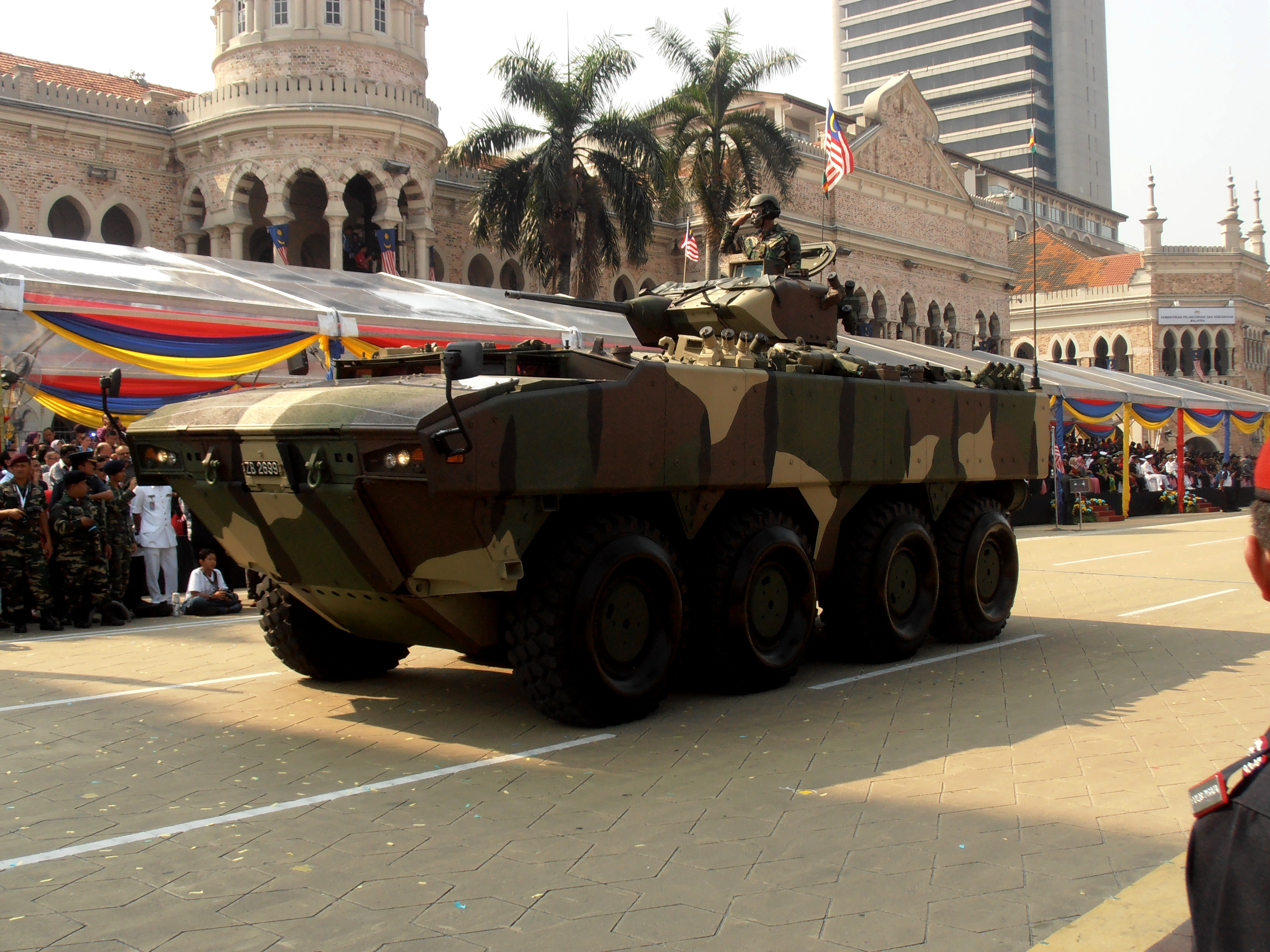
A DefTech AV8.

Pekan is home to Malaysia's DefTech's Defence Technologies Division plant. DefTech is Malaysia's largest military vehicle manufacturer. Established in 2001, the plant cost around RM70 million to construct. The plant is responsible for the manufacture of all armoured vehicles and was given a RM100 million upgrade in 2014 to prepare for the production of DefTech's chief vehicle, the DefTech AV8.

Automotive Plants Since the early 1970s, local and global automotive corporations have chosen Pekan as their base. This industrial chapter in Pekan history was introduced and gathered momentum during Tun Abdul Razak's tenure as the 2nd Prime Minister of Malaysia. The legendary Tun had the vision to make Peramu as the industrial centre of Pekan.

Back then, companies like TATA (of India) and Isuzu (of Japan) had assembled motor vehicles in their Pekan base.

Past and current automotive companies operating in Pekan are:

- HICOM Automotive Manufacturers Malaysia Sdn Bhd
- DefTech
- Isuzu HICOM Malaysia
- Mercedes-Benz
- Volkswagen
- Citroen (the legendary Xantia & ZX models were assembled here)
- Suzuki
- Proton (the Tiara & Satria models were assembled here)

== Cuisine ==
Pekan offers a variety of delicious food. Being a Royal Town, Pekan enjoys the best kuih-muih (Malay delicacies) which are prepared by the same people or their descendants who used to prepare the same delicacies for the palace. Breakfast menu is aplenty to choose from. One particular novelty for breakfast is the 'roti naik' (a heavenly treat. Looks similar to small buns sold in supermarkets, but with a completely different taste, especially when it is hot). This particular bread can only be found in very few places, Pekan being one of them. Other delicacies are nasi dagang, kuih bakar, ikan bakar (fresh grilled fish) and others.

Kampong Mengkasar is also well known of its Murtabak. It is a unique variant of the original Indian dish that can only be found in Pekan. The Murtabak Pekan was not started in Kampong Mengkasar, but it is available here throughout the year. Other murtabak outlets in Pekan, such as the Murtabak Mawar (also known as murtabak Sultan), are only available in the month of Ramadhan.

== Education ==
Tertiary level education:

- Universiti Malaysia Pahang Al-Sultan Abdullah (UMPSA)
- DRB-Hicom University of Automotive Malaysia
- Kolej Komuniti Pekan
- Institut Kemahiran MARA Tan Sri Yahya bin Ahmad (IKM)
- GIATMARA Pekan

Secondary level education:

- MRSM Tun Abdul Razak
- Sekolah Sains Sultan Ahmad Shah (SHAH)
- Sekolah Menengah Kebangsaan Seri Pekan
- Sekolah Menengah Kebangsaan Ahmad (Ahmad High School)
- Sekolah Menengah Kebangsaan Tengku Abdullah
- Sekolah Menengah Kebangsaan Dato' Mahmud Mat

Primary level education:

- Sekolah Rendah Kebangsaan Seri Biram
- Sekolah Rendah Kebangsaan Ahmad
- Sekolah Rendah Seri Terentang
- Sekolah Rendah Kebangsaan Peramu

Pre-school level education:

- Tadika INTAZ
- Tadika Cikgu Siti (near Padang Renjer) – established since 1975
- Tadika Murni

== Climate ==
Pekan has a tropical rainforest climate (Af) with heavy to very heavy rainfall year-round.

Climate data for Pekan
Month	Jan	Feb	Mar	Apr	May	Jun	Jul	Aug	Sep	Oct	Nov	Dec	Year
Mean daily maximum °C (°F)	29.2 (84.6)	30.2 (86.4)	31.2 (88.2)	32.0 (89.6)	32.2 (90.0)	31.9 (89.4)	31.7 (89.1)	31.8 (89.2)	31.6 (88.9)	31.3 (88.3)	30.1 (86.2)	29.3 (84.7)	31.0 (87.9)
Daily mean °C (°F)	25.7 (78.3)	26.1 (79.0)	26.7 (80.1)	27.2 (81.0)	27.4 (81.3)	27.2 (81.0)	26.9 (80.4)	27.1 (80.8)	26.9 (80.4)	26.8 (80.2)	26.2 (79.2)	26.0 (78.8)	26.7 (80.0)
Mean daily minimum °C (°F)	22.2 (72.0)	22.1 (71.8)	22.2 (72.0)	22.5 (72.5)	22.7 (72.9)	22.6 (72.7)	22.2 (72.0)	22.4 (72.3)	22.2 (72.0)	22.3 (72.1)	22.4 (72.3)	22.7 (72.9)	22.4 (72.3)
Average precipitation mm (inches)	374 (14.7)	211 (8.3)	216 (8.5)	192 (7.6)	162 (6.4)	116 (4.6)	125 (4.9)	124 (4.9)	162 (6.4)	254 (10.0)	364 (14.3)	654 (25.7)	2,954 (116.3)
Source: Climate-Data.org

== Notable personalities ==
- Tun Abdul Razak bin Dato' Hussein: Malaysia's 2nd Prime Minister (in office 1970 – 76) and father to Datuk Seri Najib.
- Tun Mohd Khalil Yaakob: 6th Governor of Melaka, 12th Menteri Besar of Pahang.
