= Yaakub Isa =

Malaysian writer (1939–2019)

- يعقوب عيسى
- Born: 7 September 1939; Kampung Ganchong, Pekan, Pahang
- Died: 7 July 2019 (aged 79); Pekan, Pahang
- Occupations: Teacher, researcher, writer
- Writing career
- Genre: Short stories
- Notable awards: Order of Darjah Indera Mahkota Pahang and the title of Dato (2003); Medal of Merit (Pingat Jasa) of the Scout Federation of Malaysia (2015)

Yaakub Isa (7 September 1939, Kampung Ganchong, Pekan, Pahang – 7 July 2019, Pekan, Pahang) was a Malaysian teacher, writer, scholar of the Malay language and literature.

== Short biography ==
In 1954, he graduated from the Malay school in Kuantan. In 1960 he graduated from the Sultan Idris Teachers College in Tanjung Malim, and in 1972, he graduated from the University of Malaya. From 1960 to 1969, he worked as a school teacher. He worked as a principal from 1972 to 1983. From 1983 to 1985, he served as an officer of the Pahang State Department of Education, and from 1985 until retirement in 1994 as a deputy director for school programs. Later he worked as a coordinator of educational programs of the Pahang Foundation Buletin. He was also a member of the governing council of the Sultan Abu Bakar Museum, the committee of the Council for Cultural Affairs of Pahang and the coordinator of writing textbooks of the Koran Academy and religious commandments (Kuantan, Pahang).

== Creativity ==
He wrote short stories, studied the history of Pahang, the problems of education and development of the Malay language, literature and traditional culture. He was the author of the Dictionary of the Classical Malay language (1997) and the biography of the second Prime Minister of Malaysia, Abdul Razak Hussein.

== Awards ==
- Order of Darjah Indera Mahkota Pahang and the title of Dato (2003)
- Medal of Merit (Pingat Jasa) of the Scout Federation of Malaysia (2015)

== Publications ==
- Sejarah Melayu di-tinjau dari beberapa aspek // Dewan bahasa Dewan Bahasa, Vol. 13, No. 11 (Nov .. 1969), p. 500-512, Vol. 13, No. 11 (Nov. 1969), p. 500-512
- Syair Tanah Melayu iaitu cerita perang Pahang dan Johor Baharu: suatu pandangan awal dan penurunan semula teks. Georgetown: Persatuan Sejarah Pahang, 1982.
- Pembinaan alat penyeliaan dalam bilik darjah melalui projek sekolah mentor // Malaysiana. Jurnal Pendidikan Pahang, 1990, 139 pp.
- Almanak pendidikan. Kuala Lumpur: Berita Punlishing, 1996, 386 p. ISBN 9789679693577
- Pendidikan di Pahang 1926 hingga 1949: satu kajian pengurusan pendidikan berdasarkan buku perharian Sekolah Melayu Serandu, Pekan, 1996
- Kamus bahasa Melayu klasik. Siri kamus berita. Kuala Lumpur: Berita Punlishing, 1997, 217 pp. ISBN 9789679694703
- (Ed.) Monograf Pahang dalam sejarah VI. Pekan: Lembaga Muzium Negeri Pahang, 1997, 114 pp. (in cooperation with Mohamed Mokhtar Abu Bakar).
- (Ed.) Monograf Pahang dalam sejarah VI. Pekan: Lembaga Muzium Negeri Pahang, 1997, 98 pp. (in cooperation with Mohamed Mokhtar Abu Bakar).
- Hukum kanun Pahang: manuskrip agung Negeri Pahang. Pekan: Lembaga Muzium Negeri Pahang, 2003, 213 pp. ISBN 9789832456063
- Citra Pahang dalam teks klasik. Diselenggarakan oleh Yaakub Isa. Pekan: Lembaga Muzium Negeri Pahang, 2003, 360 pp. ISBN 9789832456162
- Perkembangan Keusasteraan Pahang awal 1990-an hingga kini. Pertemuan Penulis Johor – Pahang: Pemerkasaan Persuratan Johor – Pahang. Johor Bahru: Dewan Bahasa dan Pustaka Wilayah Selatan, 2004, 30 pp.
- (Ed.) Tulisan jawi: sejarah, seni dan warisan = Jawi script: history, art and heritage. Pekan: Lembaga Muzium Negeri Pahang, 2005, 109 pp. (in cooperation with Ahmad Farid Abd. Jalal).
- (Ed.) Zakaria Hitam. Raja Donai bahtera kulit kacang. Disusun semula dan diselenggarakan oleh Yaakub Isa. Kuala Lumpur: Dewan Bahasa dan Pustaka, 2006, 299 pp. ISBN 9789836290588
- Idealisme dan pemikiran Tun Abdul Razak. Tanjong Malim: Universiti Pendidikan Sultan Idris, 2007, 448 pp. ISBN 9789834143169
- (Ed.) Halim Ibrahim. Raja dan rakyat berpisah tiada: Kebawah Duli Yang Maha Mulia Sultan Pahang, Sultan Haji Ahmad Shah al-Musta'in Billah Ibni al-marhum Sultan Abu Bakar Ri'ayatuddin al-Mu'adzam Shah. Ed. Mazlina Abdul Majid, Dato 'Yaakob Isa, Ahmad Fadil Yasin. Pahang, 2010, 271 pp. ISBN 9789675980008
