= Abu Bakr Palace =

- Istana Abu Bakar ايستان ابو بکر
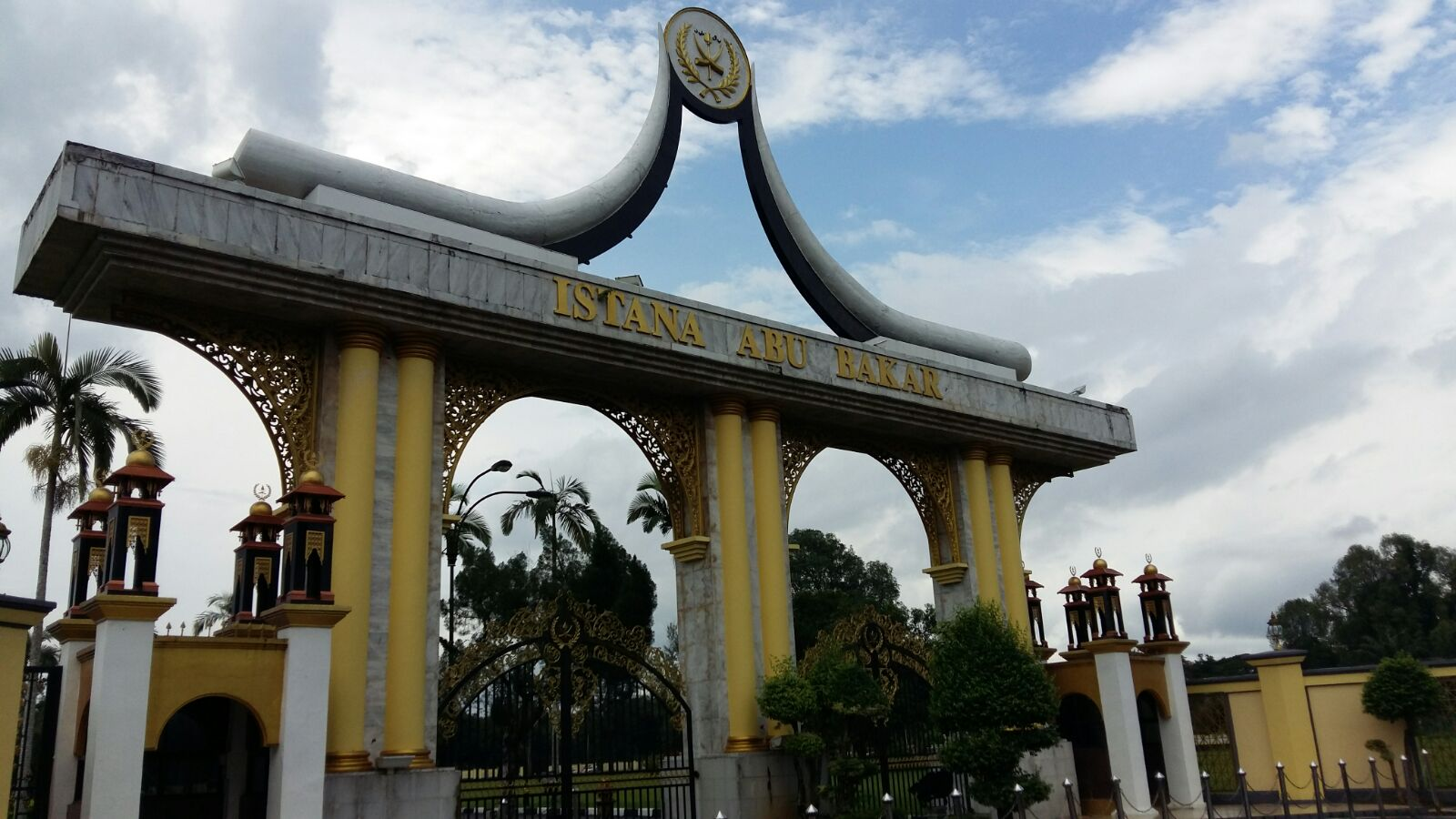
- Main entrance of Abu Bakr Palace

General information
- Type: Royal palace
- Architectural style: Malay modern architecture
- Location: Pekan, Pahang, Malaysia
- Current tenants: Abdullah, Sultan of Pahang
- Groundbreaking: 1960
- Construction started: 1960
- Completed: 1974

Istana Abu Bakar is the official palace for Sultan Pahang which is located at Pekan, Pahang, Malaysia. The palace were named after forth Sultan Pahang , Sultan Abu Bakar Riayatuddin Al-Muadzam Shah ibni Almarhum Sultan Abdullah Al-Mutassim Billah Shah.

The palace is located adjacent to Royal Pahang polo Club.

The palace are used for investitures and royal ceremonies.

== See Also ==
- Sultan Abu Bakar Museum
