= Malaysia Federal Route 230 =

Road in Malaysia

Federal Route 230
- Jalan Kuantan - Cherok Paloh

Route information
- Length: 24.59 km (15.28 mi)

Major junctions
- North end: Kampung Kuala Baharu
- FT 183 Tanjung Lumpur Highway; FT 3 AH18 Federal Route 3
- South end: Kampung Ubai

Location
- Country: Malaysia
- Primary destinations: Sepat Beach; Ceruk Paluh

Highway system
- Highways in Malaysia; Expressways; Federal; State

Federal Route 230, or Jalan Kuantan - Cherok Paloh (formerly Pahang State Route C17), is a federal road in Pahang, Malaysia. The Kilometre Zero of the Federal Route 230 starts at Kampung Kuala Baharu junctions.

== Features ==
At most sections, the Federal Route 183 was built under the JKR R5 road standard, with a speed limit of 90 km/h.

== List of junctions ==
| Km | Exit | Junctions | To | Remarks |
|---|---|---|---|---|
| FT 230; 0 | | Kampung Kuala Baharu | FT 183 Tanjung Lumpur Highway North; Kuantan; Tanjung Lumpur Southwest; Gambang; Pekan | T-junctions |
| | | Kem Padang Perdana | | |
| | | Kampung Rhu Bongkok | | |
| | | Sungai Bongkok bridge | | |
| | | Kampung Sungai Bongkok | | |
| | | Kampung Sungai Dua | | |
| | | Kampung Ketapang | | |
| | | Kampung Sepat | | |
| | | Sepat Beach | Sepat Beach; V | |
| | | Sungai Pertul bridge | | |
| | | Kampung Pertul | | |
| | | Kuala Penor | Penor Beach; V | |
| | | Sungai Penor bridge | | |
| | | Sungai Penor | | |
| | | Sungai Penor bridge | | |
| | | Kampung Tebing Tinggi | | |
| | | Kampung Hijrah | | |
Kuantan-Pekan district border
| | | Ceruk Paluh | Kampung Permatang Gelugor | T-junctions |
| | | Kampung Penyangu | | |
| | | Kampung Baharu Ubai | | |
| | | Kampung Ubai | North; FT 3 AH18 Kuala Terengganu; FT 3 AH18 Kuantan; FT 2 Gambang; East Coast Expressway FT 2 AH141 Kuala Lumpur South; FT 3 AH18 Pekan; FT 3 AH18 Rompin; FT 3 AH18 Johor Bahru | T-junctions |
