= Bandar Putra, Kuantan =

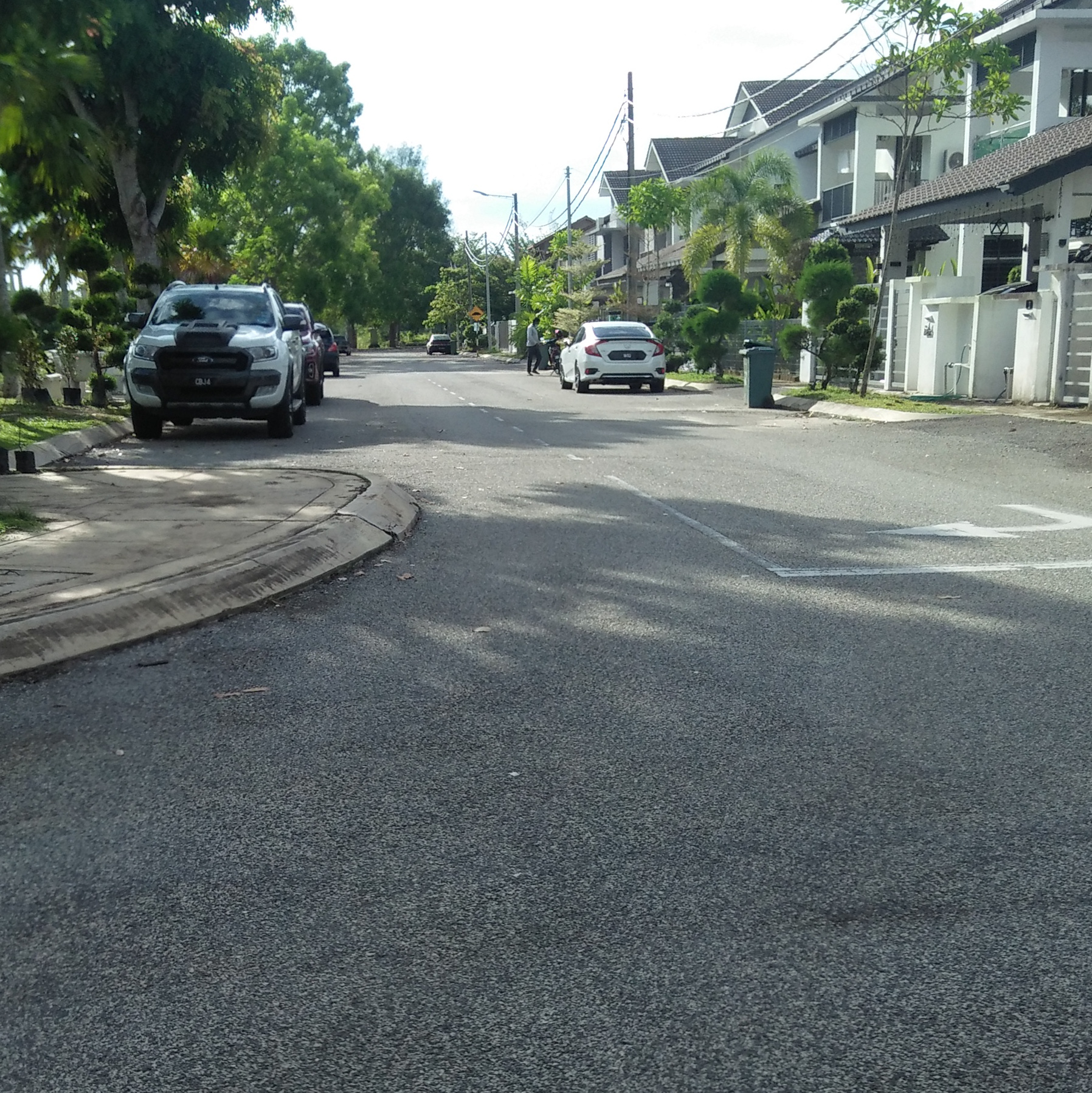
Bandar Putra residence.

Bandar Putra Kuantan is a newly developed township located in Tanjung Lumpur, Kuantan, Pahang, Malaysia. It can be access by using Tanjung Lumpur main road directly from Kuantan city. This township also located near with the Yayasan Pahang main building and TMG mall Tanjung Lumpur. Its postcode is 26060.
