= Malaysia Federal Route 183 =

Road in Malaysia

Federal Route 183
- Tanjung Lumpur Highway (Jalan Abu Bakar)

Route information
- Maintained by Malaysian Public Works Department
- Length: 16.60 km (10.31 mi)

Major junctions
- North end: Kuantan on Padang Lalang junctions
- FT 2 Jalan Teluk Sisik; FT 2 Jalan Beserah; FT 3 AH18 Federal Route 3 FT 135 Jalan Teluk Sisik; FT 230 Jalan Ceruk Paluh
- South end: Penor

Location
- Country: Malaysia
- Primary destinations: Tanjung Lumpur; Pantai Sepat; Pantai Penor; Ceruk Paloh; Pekan; Johor Bahru

Highway system
- Highways in Malaysia; Expressways; Federal; State

Tanjung Lumpur Highway, or Jalan Abu Bakar, Federal Route 183, is a major highway in Kuantan, Pahang, Malaysia. The Kilometre Zero of the Federal Route 183 starts at Padang Lalang junctions.

== Features ==
At most sections, the Federal Route 183 was built under the JKR R5 road standard, allowing maximum speed limit of up to 90 km/h.

== List of junctions ==
Km	Exit	Junctions	To	Remarks
		Kuantan; Padang Lalang Junctions	West; FT 2 Jalan Teluk Sisik; FT 2 Town Centre; East Coast Expressway FT 2 AH141 Kuala Lumpur; Keropok Lekor stalls Sultan Ahmad Shah Mosque; Kuantan Esplanade North; FT 2 Jalan Beserah; FT 2 Beserah; FT 2 Kuantan Port; FT 3 AH18 Kuala Terengganu East; FT 135 Jalan Teluk Sisik; Teluk Cempedak	Junctions
FT 185 TTanjung Lumpur Highway; Start/End of highway
		Sungai Kuantan Bridge; Jeti Syahbandar	Below Bridge; Jeti Syahbandar	Start/End of bridge Interchange
		Sungai Kuantan Bridge		
		Sungai Kuantan Bridge; Tanjung Lumpur	Below Bridge; Tanjung Lumpur	Start/End of bridge Interchange
		Kampung Tanjung Lumpur	Kampung Tanjung Lumpur V Tanjung Lumpur Beach; Ikan Bakar stalls	From Kuantan only
		U-Turn	U-Turn	
				Start/End of dual carriageway
		Kampung Peramu		
		Kampung Baharu		
		Kampung Peramu Maju		
		Kampung Peramu Hulu		
		Yayasan Pahang headquarters	Yayasan Pahang headquarters Maahad Tahfiz Pahang; Kolej Yayasan Pahang main campus Mabiq restaurant	
		Taman Peramu Jaya		
		Kampung Anak Air	V Anak Air Beach	T-junctions
		Kampung Derhaka		
		Kampung Kempedang		
		Kampung Baharu		
		Sepat Beach	V Sepat Beach; Kampung Sungai Dua	T-junctions
		Kampung Soli		
		Jalan Ceruk Paluh	South; FT 230 Jalan Ceruk Paluh; Penor Beach; Ceruk Paluh	T-junctions
		Kampung Pahang		
		Kampung Baharu		
FT 185 Tanjung Lumpur Highway; Start/End of highway
		Penor	North; FT 2 Gambang; East Coast Expressway FT 2 AH141 Kuala Lumpur; FT 3 AH18 Sultan Haji Ahmad Shah Airport; FT 3 AH18 Kuala Terengganu South; FT 3 AH18 Pekan; FT 3 AH18 Rompin; FT 3 AH18 Mersing; FT 3 AH18 Johor Bahru	T-junctions
