= Penor, Pahang =

Town in Pahang, Malaysia

Coordinates: 3°39′N 103°22′E

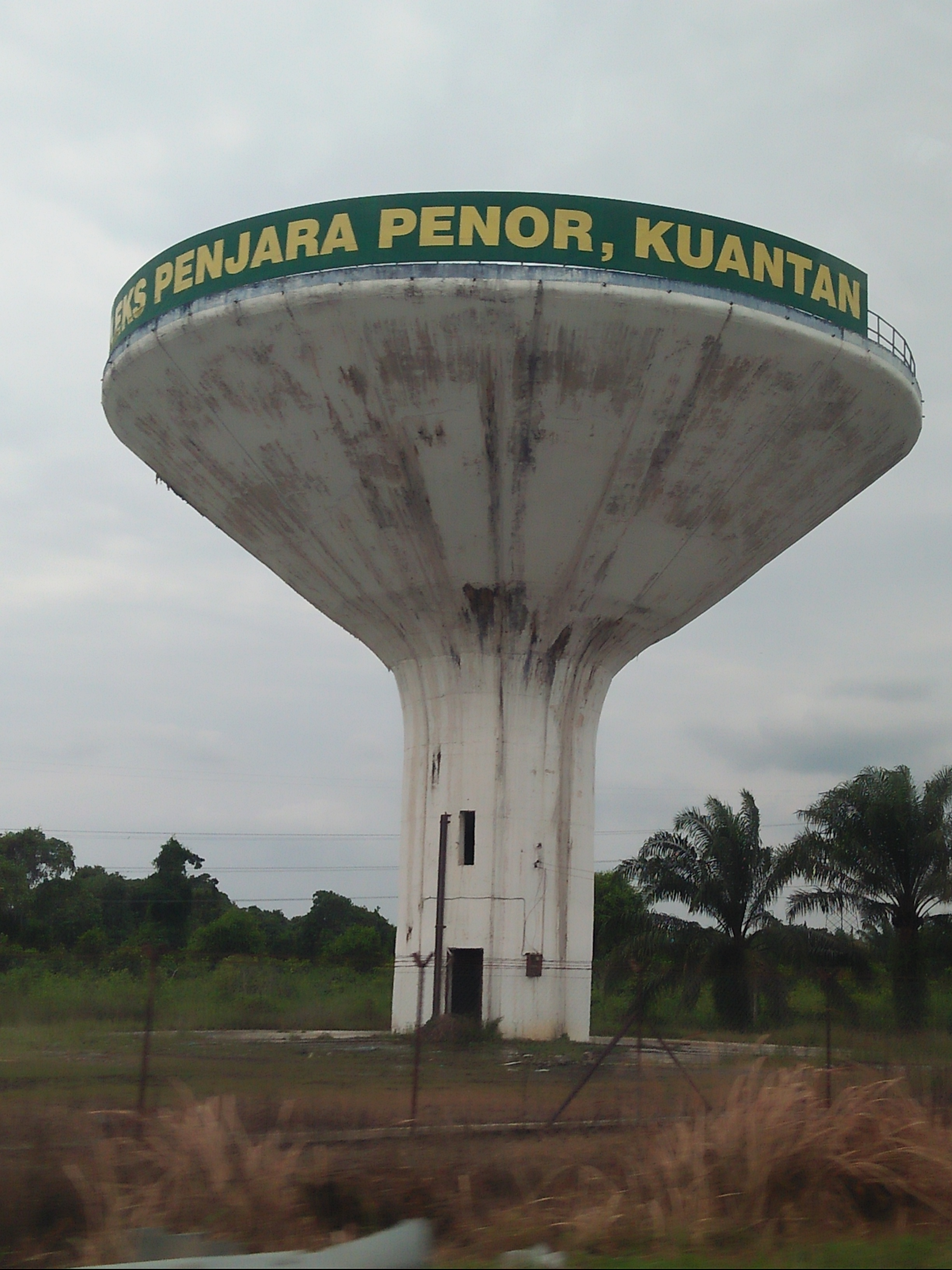
The old water tower of Penor's jail, once be a landmark of Penor.

Penor is a small town in Kuantan District, Pahang, Malaysia. Located near the Kuantan-Pekan district border, it is accessible by the Tanjung Lumpur Highway (Federal Route 183). Penor houses the jail of Pahang, Penor Prison, which is Penor's landmark. Apart from the jail, Penor is famous among locals for its calm beach and also as a fishing spot.

The prison was in the news in 2020 for supporting frontline workers during COVID19, by helping sew Personal Protective Equipment (PPE) for healthcare workers. The prison inmates were also part of a program to help keep alive the thousand-year-old art form of the Royal Pahang Weaving (known in Malay as Tenun Pahang Diraja).
