= Tanjung Lumpur =

Coordinates: 3°47′52″N 103°2′19″E

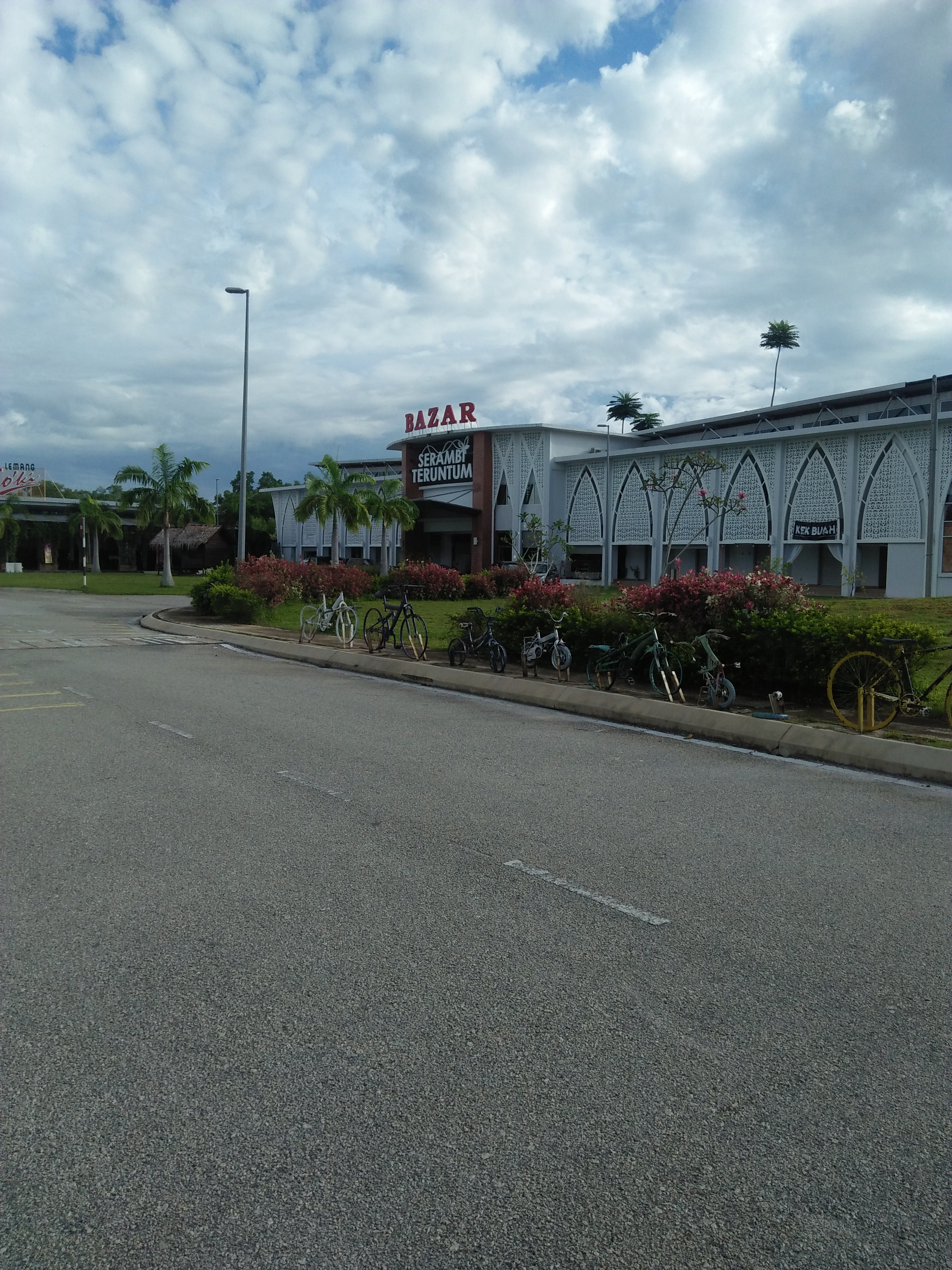
Bazar Serambi Teruntum.

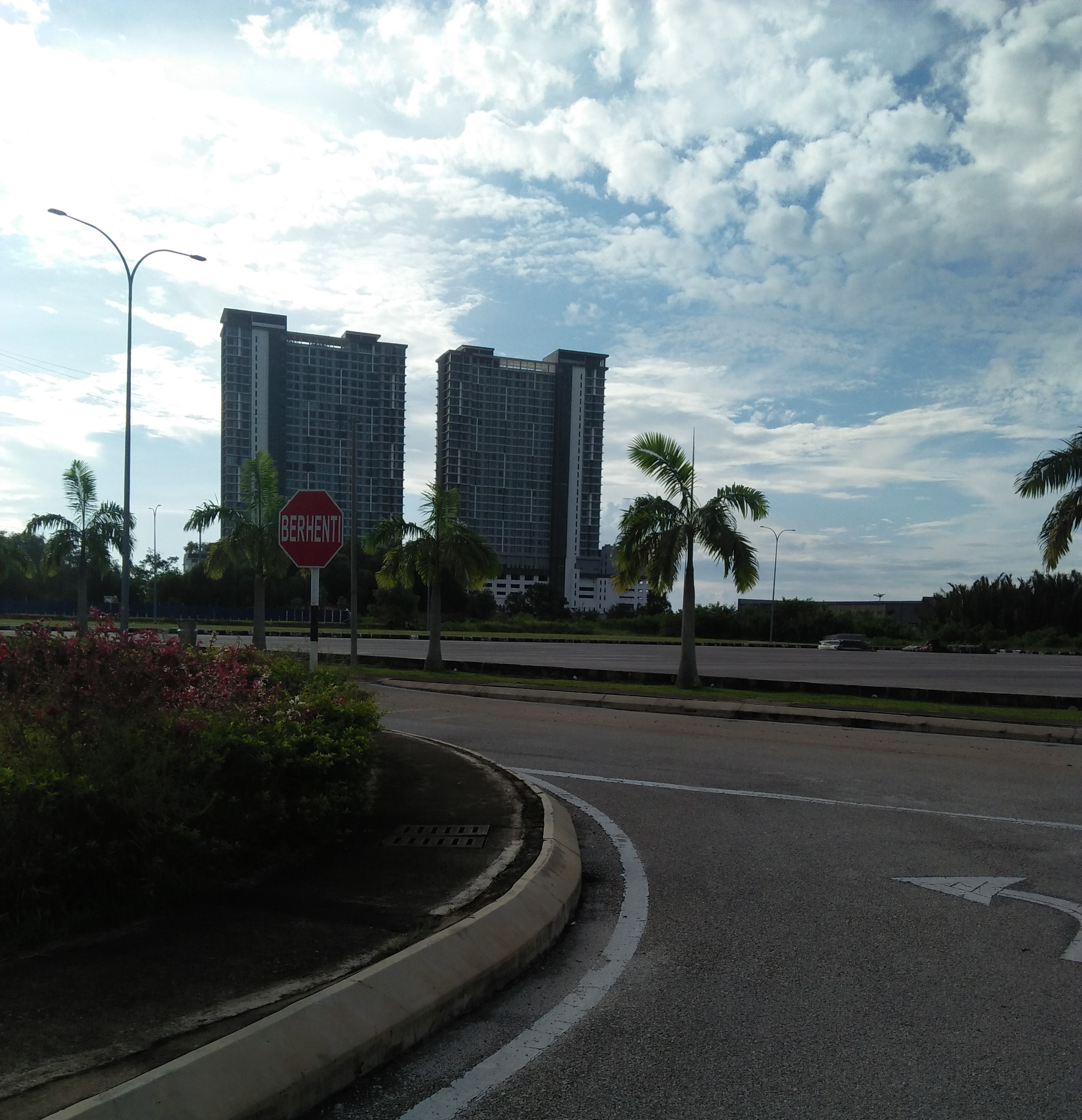
Swiss Belhotel form far.

Tanjung Lumpur is a traditional fishing village located near the Kuantan river in Kuantan District, Pahang, Malaysia. It is loosely translated into English as the " Cape of Mud". This village was in fact one of the earliest villages opened by the Malays in Kuantan many decades ago. It is located in the district of Kuantan about 2 kilometers away from Kuantan city. Tanjung Lumpur and Kuantan is divided by Kuantan river at the middle and connected by a bridge (Jalan Abu Bakar) Federal Route 183 . Tanjung Lumpur is well known for its ikan bakar (grilled fish). Tanjung Lumpur now rapidly develop with the new infrastructure such as Swiss-Belhotel Kuantan, KPJ Kuantan and Serambi Teruntum.
