= Kuantan River =

River in Pahang, Malaysia

The Kuantan River (Malay: Sungai Kuantan) is a river in Pahang, Malaysia. It runs from Sungai Lembing through Kuantan City before flowing out to South China Sea.

One section of the Kuantan River flows past an ancient mangrove forest. This forest, which has existed for 500 years, is of vital importance and immense value for the many animal and bird species that it supports as well as for the ecology of the area. The swamp sprawls over an area of 340 hectares.

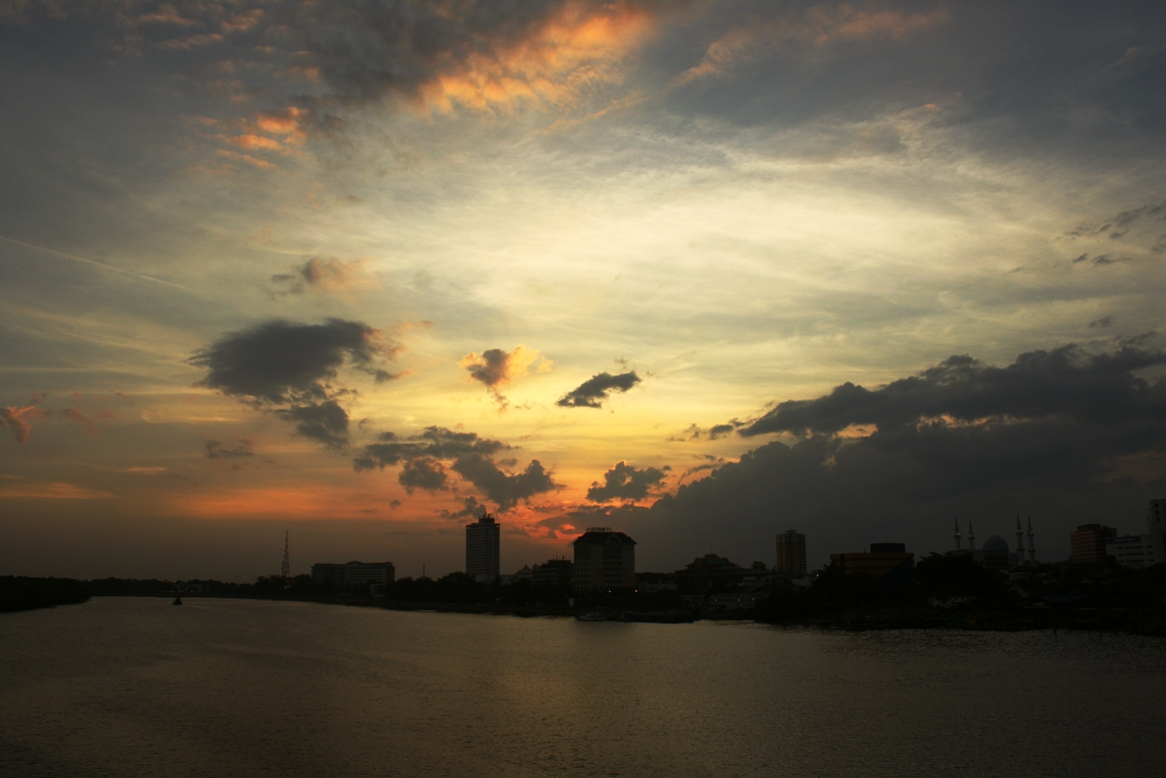
An evening view of the Kuantan River.

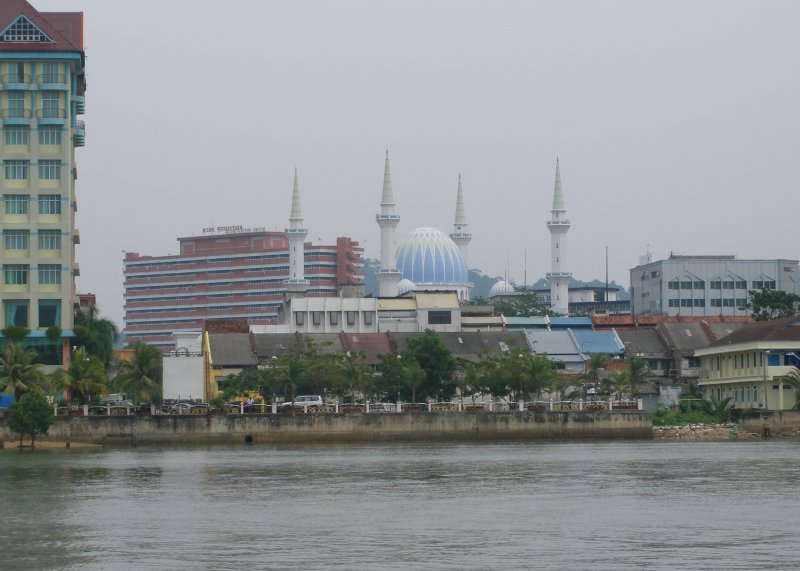
Kuantan City from the Kuantan River.

== See also ==
- List of rivers of Malaysia

== Gallery ==
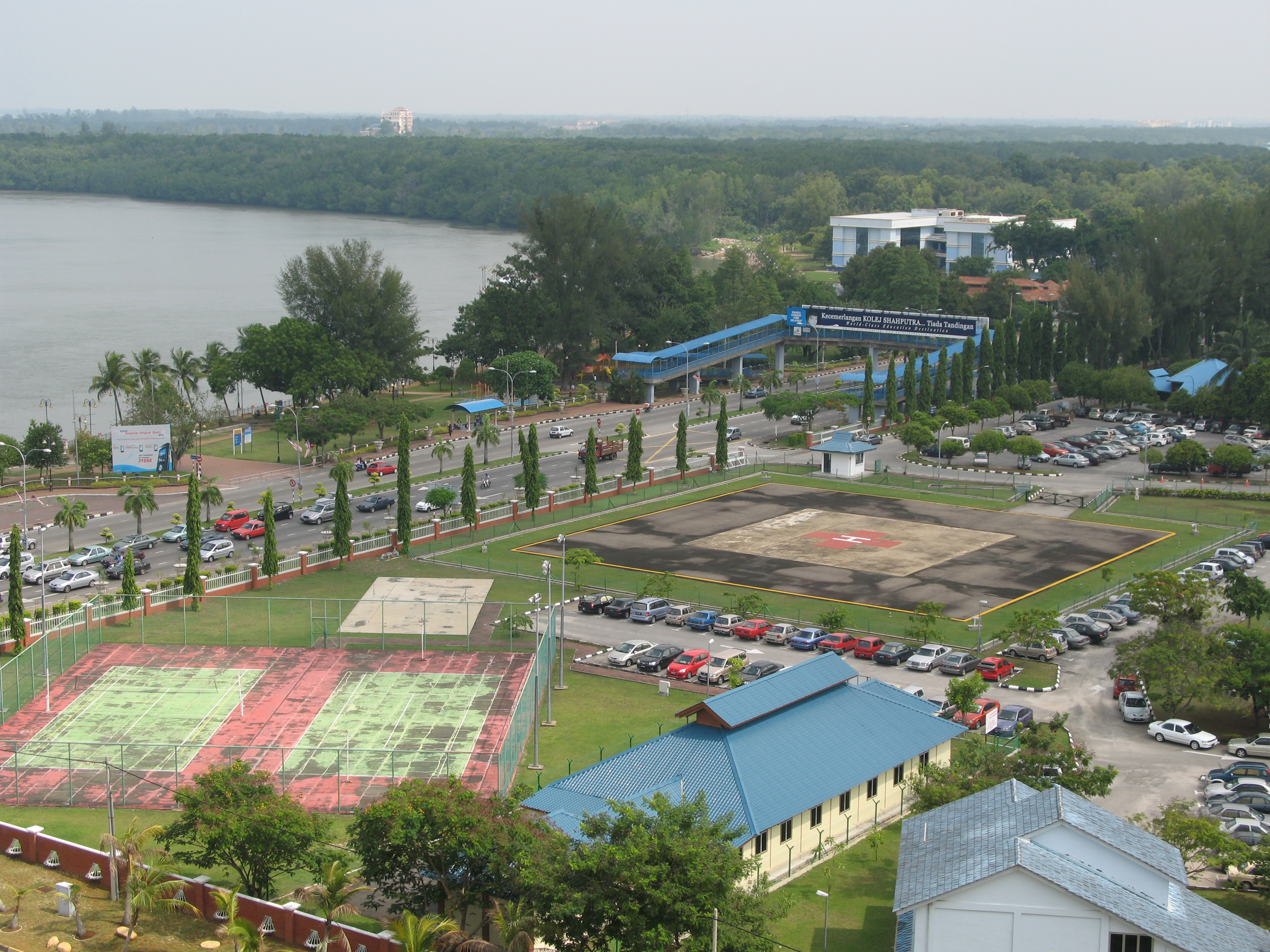
Sungai Kuantan (Kuantan River) as seen on the left of the picture, flows through part of Kuantan City.
