= Sultan Abu Bakar Museum =

Museum in Pekan, Pahang, Malaysia

- Muzium Sultan Abu Bakar
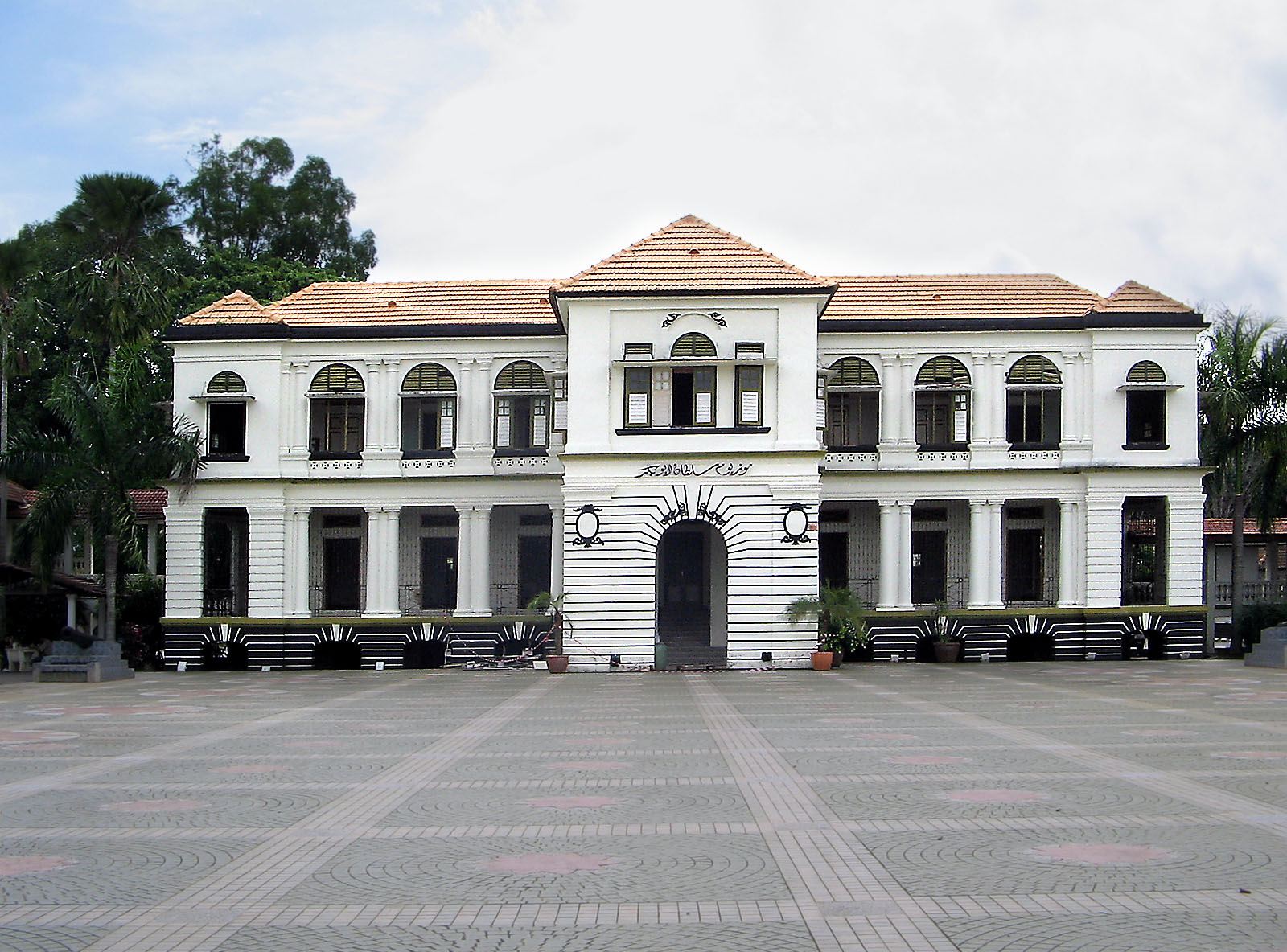
- Established: 21 October 1976
- Location: Pekan, Pahang, Malaysia
- Coordinates: 3°29′36.7″N 103°23′25.3″E
- Type: museum

The Sultan Abu Bakar Museum (Malay: Muzium Sultan Abu Bakar) is a museum in Pekan, Pahang, Malaysia. It showcases the native people relics found in the country.

== History ==
The museum building was constructed in the 1920s during British Malaya. Since then, the building has been used for the official residence for British government, army barracks and official palace of Sultan Abu Bakar. The building was then converted to a museum after four years of renovation. It was finally opened by Sultan Ahmad Shah on 21 October 1976.

== Exhibitions ==
The museum exhibits collection of ancient Chinese glassware and ceramics, as well as artifacts related to the history of Pahang and Pahang Sultanate.

== Gallery ==
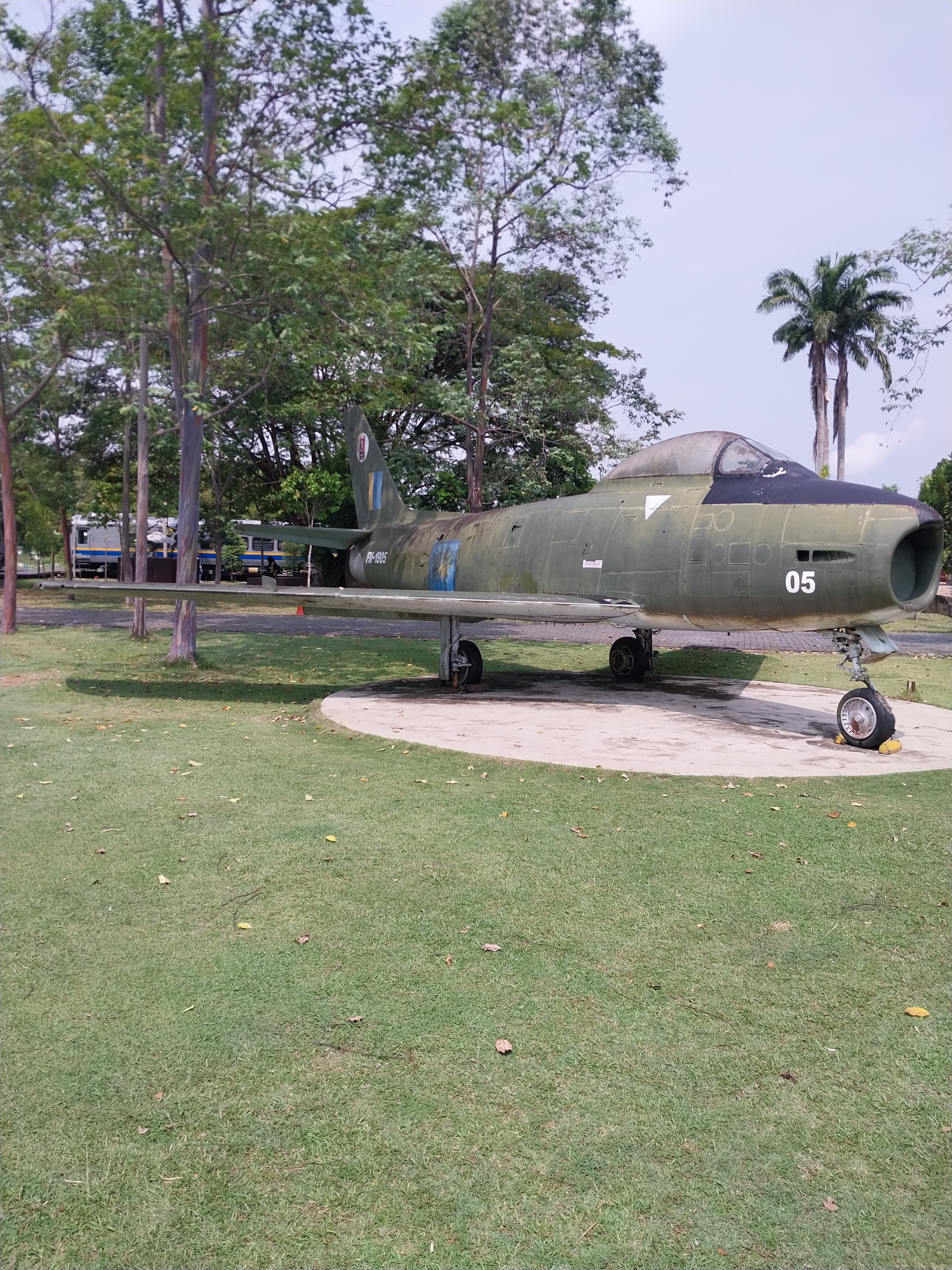
CAC Sabre of RMAF monument in Pekan, Pahang.

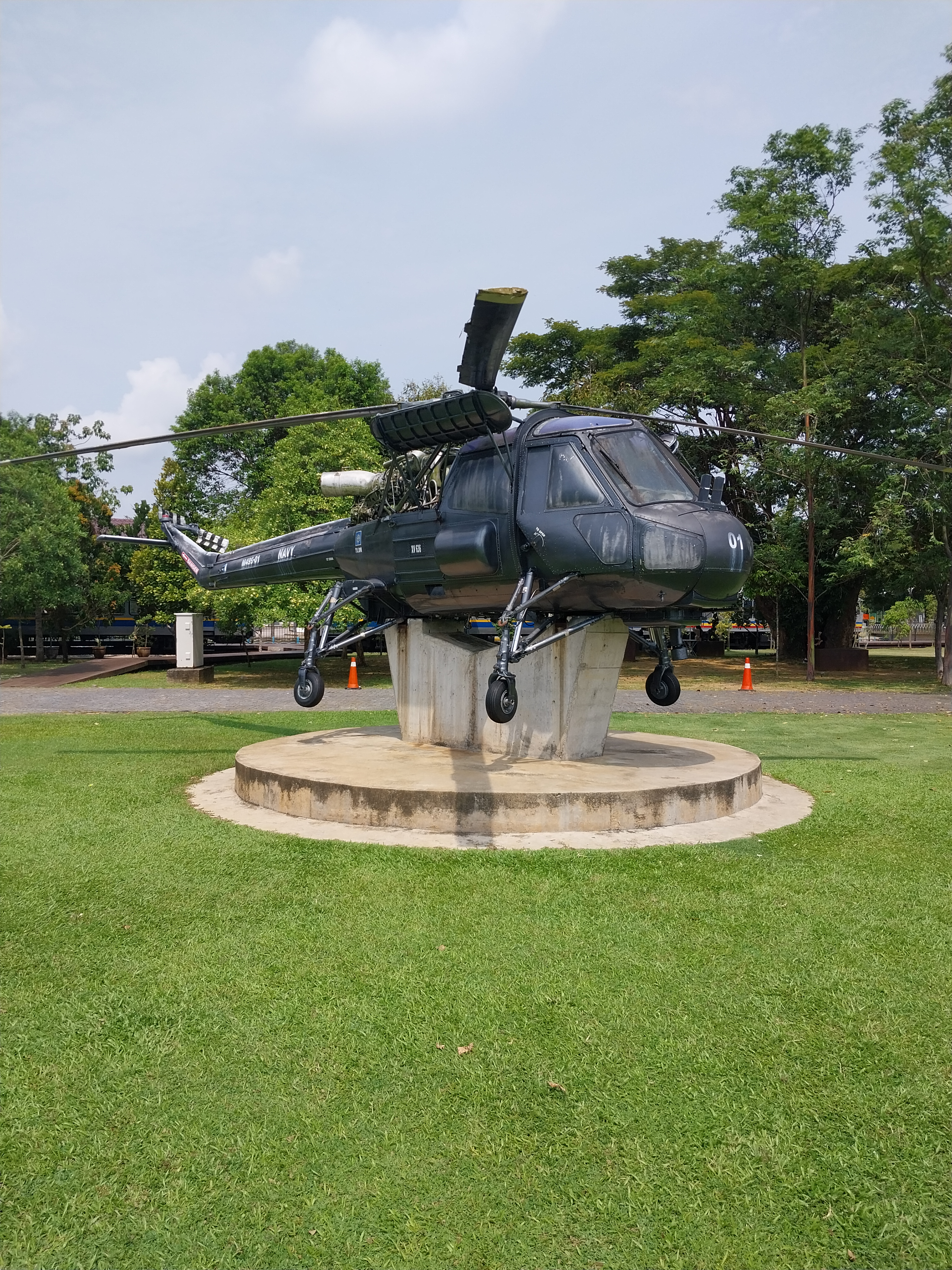
Westland Wasp of RMN monument in Pekan, Pahang.

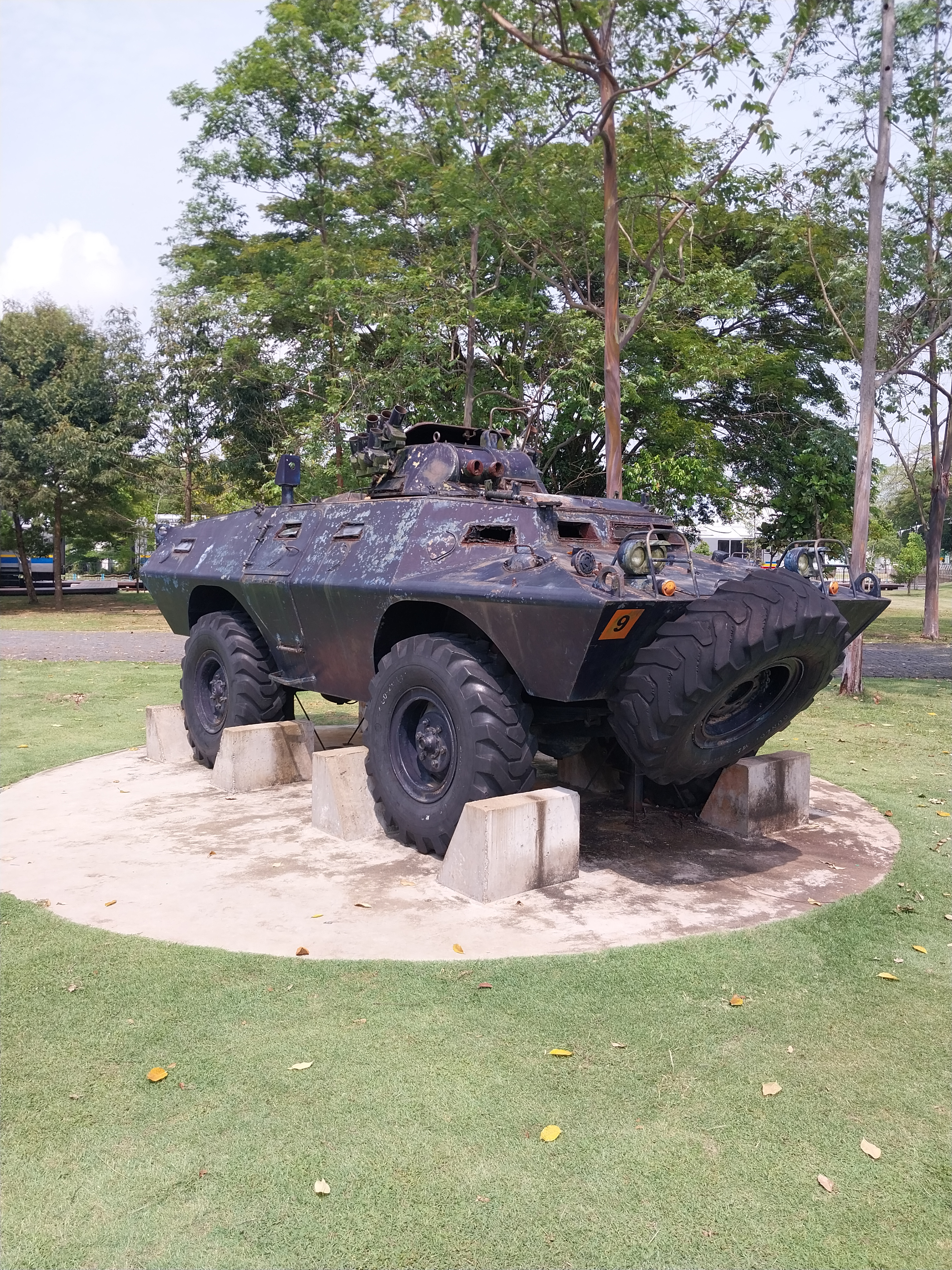
V-150 Commando of RMP monument in Pekan, Pahang.

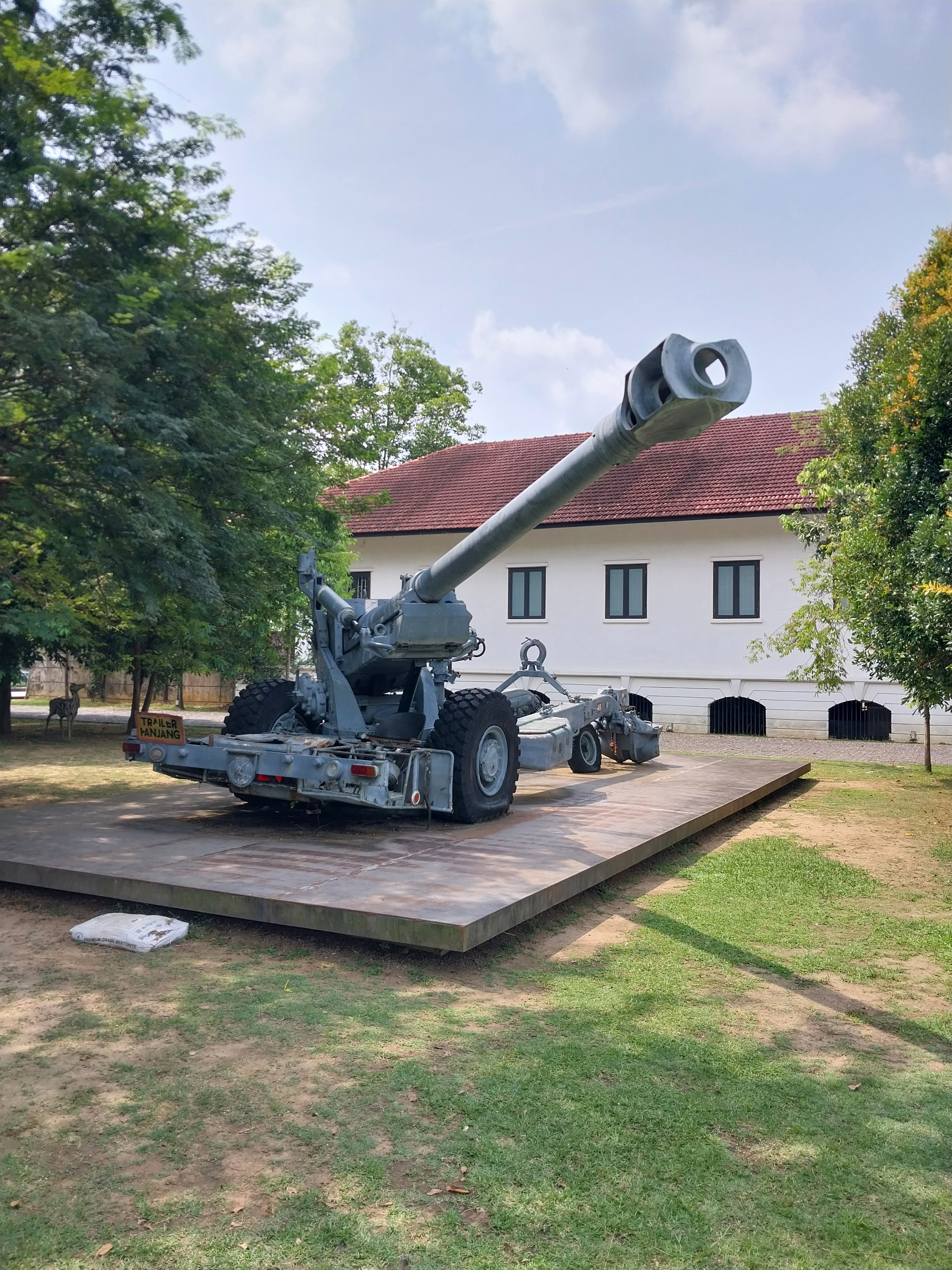
VSEL FH70 155 mm towed howitzer monument of Malaysian Army in Pekan, Pahang.

== See also ==
- List of museums in Malaysia
