= Cherok Paloh =

Village in Pekan District, Pahang, Malaysia

Coordinates: 3°37′00.9″N 103°22′58.8″E

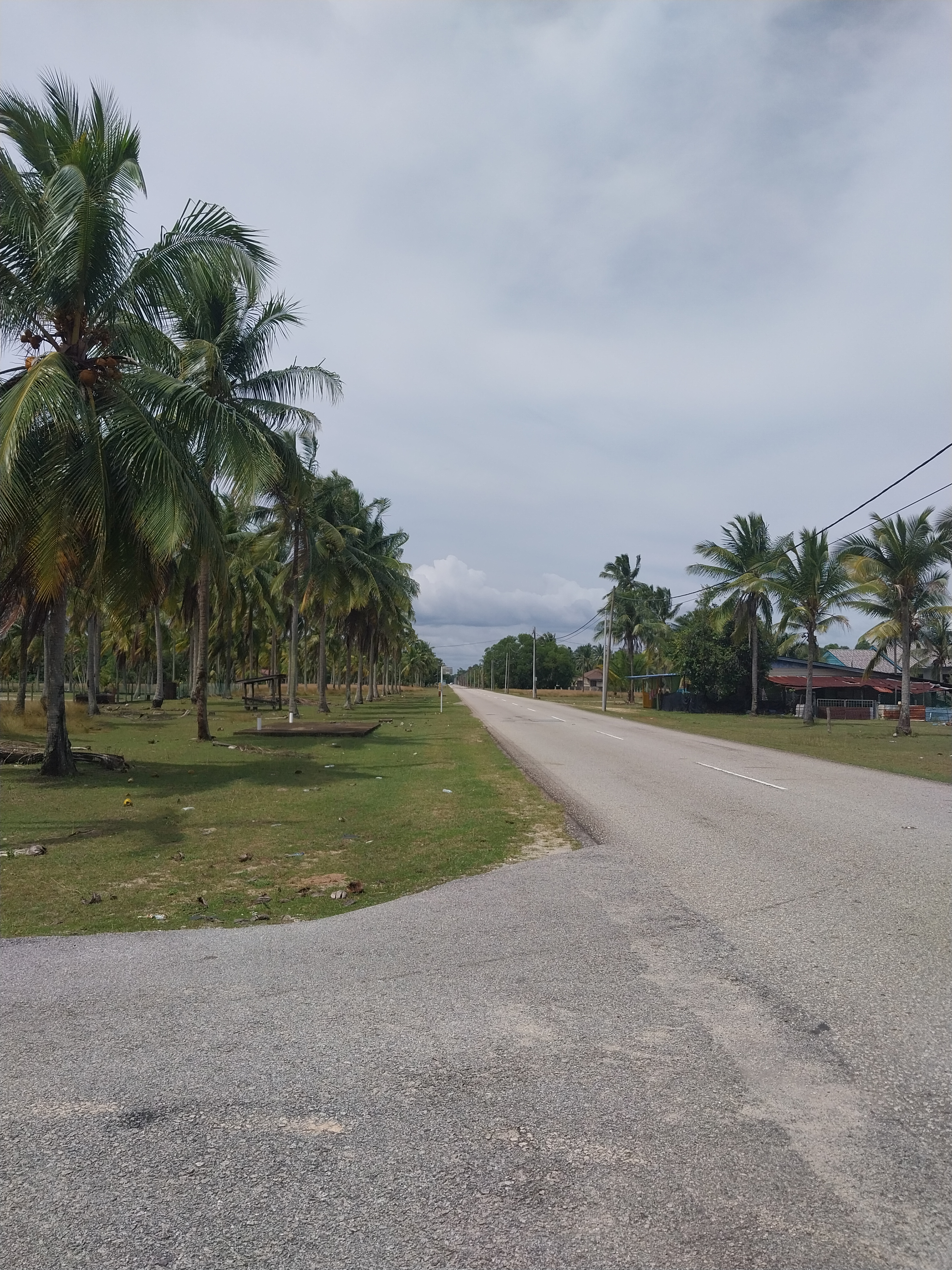
Cherok Paloh village.

Cherok Paloh is a village in Pekan District, Pahang, Malaysia. It is situated about 38 km south from Kuantan town and 14 km north of downtown Pekan. Cherok Paloh is famous as a fishing area and coconut tree cultivation done by the locals. Local residents also do a livestock farming such as cows, buffalo, goat and horse.
