= USS Hopkins =

USS Hopkins has been the name of more than one United States Navy ship, named in honor of Commodore Esek Hopkins, and may refer to:

- USS Hopkins (DD-6), a destroyer in commission from 1903 to 1919
- USS Hopkins (SP-3294), a patrol vessel in commission from 1918 to 1920
- USS Hopkins (DD-249), a destroyer commissioned in 1921, converted into a fast minesweeper in 1939, and decommissioned in 1945

== See also ==
- SS Stephen Hopkins, a US Liberty ship, 1942
