= Rough Creek =

Rough Creek may refer to:

- Rough Creek (Conasauga River tributary), a stream in Georgia
- Rough Creek (Missouri)
- Rough Creek (Idaho), a primary outflow of Rough Lake, in the White Cloud Mountains Custer County, Idaho
- Rough Creek, an historical name of the Rough River in west-central Kentucky
- Rough Creek (Paluxy River tributary), stream in Texas
