= List of highways numbered 144 =

Highways numbered 144 include:

== Canada ==
- New Brunswick Route 144
- Ontario Highway 144
- Prince Edward Island Route 144

== Costa Rica ==
- National Route 144

== India ==
- National Highway 144 (India)

== Japan ==
- Japan National Route 144
- Fukuoka Prefectural Route 144
- Nara Prefectural Route 144

== Malaysia ==
- Malaysia Federal Route 144

== United Kingdom ==
- A144 road
- B144 road

== United States ==
- Interstate 144 (former proposal)
- Alabama State Route 144
- Arkansas Highway 144
- California State Route 144
- Colorado State Highway 144
- Florida State Road 144 (former)
- Georgia State Route 144
- Hawaii Route 144 (former)
- Illinois Route 144 (former)
- Indiana State Road 144
- Iowa Highway 144
- K-144 (Kansas highway)
- Kentucky Route 144
- Louisiana Highway 144
- Maine State Route 144
- Maryland Route 144
- Massachusetts Route 144 (former)
- M-144 (Michigan highway) (former)
- County Road 144 (Hennepin County, Minnesota)
- Missouri Route 144
- Nevada State Route 144 (former)
- New Mexico State Road 144
- New York State Route 144
  - County Route 144 (Rensselaer County, New York)
  - County Route 144 (Sullivan County, New York)
- North Carolina Highway 144
- Ohio State Route 144
- Oklahoma State Highway 144
- Pennsylvania Route 144
- South Dakota Highway 144
- Tennessee State Route 144
- Texas State Highway 144
  - Texas State Highway Loop 144 (former)
  - Texas State Highway Spur 144
  - Farm to Market Road 144
- Utah State Route 144
  - Utah State Route 144 (1933-1969) (former)
- Vermont Route 144
- Virginia State Route 144
  - Virginia State Route 144 (1924-1928) (former)
- Wisconsin Highway 144

Territories

- Puerto Rico Highway 144

| Preceded by 143 | Lists of highways 144 | Succeeded by 145 |
