= Rocky Ridge, Missouri =

Unincorporated community in Missouri, U.S.

Coordinates: 37°55′49″N 90°14′18″W

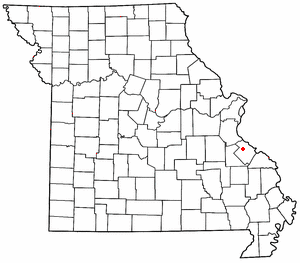

Rocky Ridge is an unincorporated community in Union Township in Sainte Genevieve County, Missouri, United States. It is located approximately 10 miles (16 km) west-southwest of Sainte Genevieve.

The community formerly had a post office, using the zip code 63676, but the mail now comes from Sainte Genevieve. Rocky Ridge was incorporated in 1987, but was disincorporated in the early 1990s. This community is a resort area and many of the cabins are only occupied part-time.

Rocky Ridge has three lakes named Ski, Wanda Lee, and Ocee. The lakes feed Establishment Creek, a tributary of the Mississippi River.
