= Missouri Route 144 =

State highway in Missouri, U.S.

Route 144
- Route 144 highlighted in red

Route information
- Maintained by MoDOT
- Length: 2.956 mi (4.757 km)
- Existed: 1972–present

Major junctions
- West end: Route 32 in Millers
- East end: Bauer Road / Park Drive in Hawn State Park

Location
- Country: United States
- State: Missouri
- Counties: Ste. Genevieve

Highway system
- Missouri State Highway System; Interstate; US; State; Supplemental
← Route 143	→ Route 145

Route 144 is a 2.956-mile-long (4.757 km) state route in Ste. Genevieve County, Missouri. Its western terminus is at Route 32 near the village of Millers. The route travels southeastward toward Hawn State Park. The road then turns east and ends at Bauer Road and Park Drive, inside the state park. The route was designated in 1972 and has kept the same alignment since.

== Route description ==
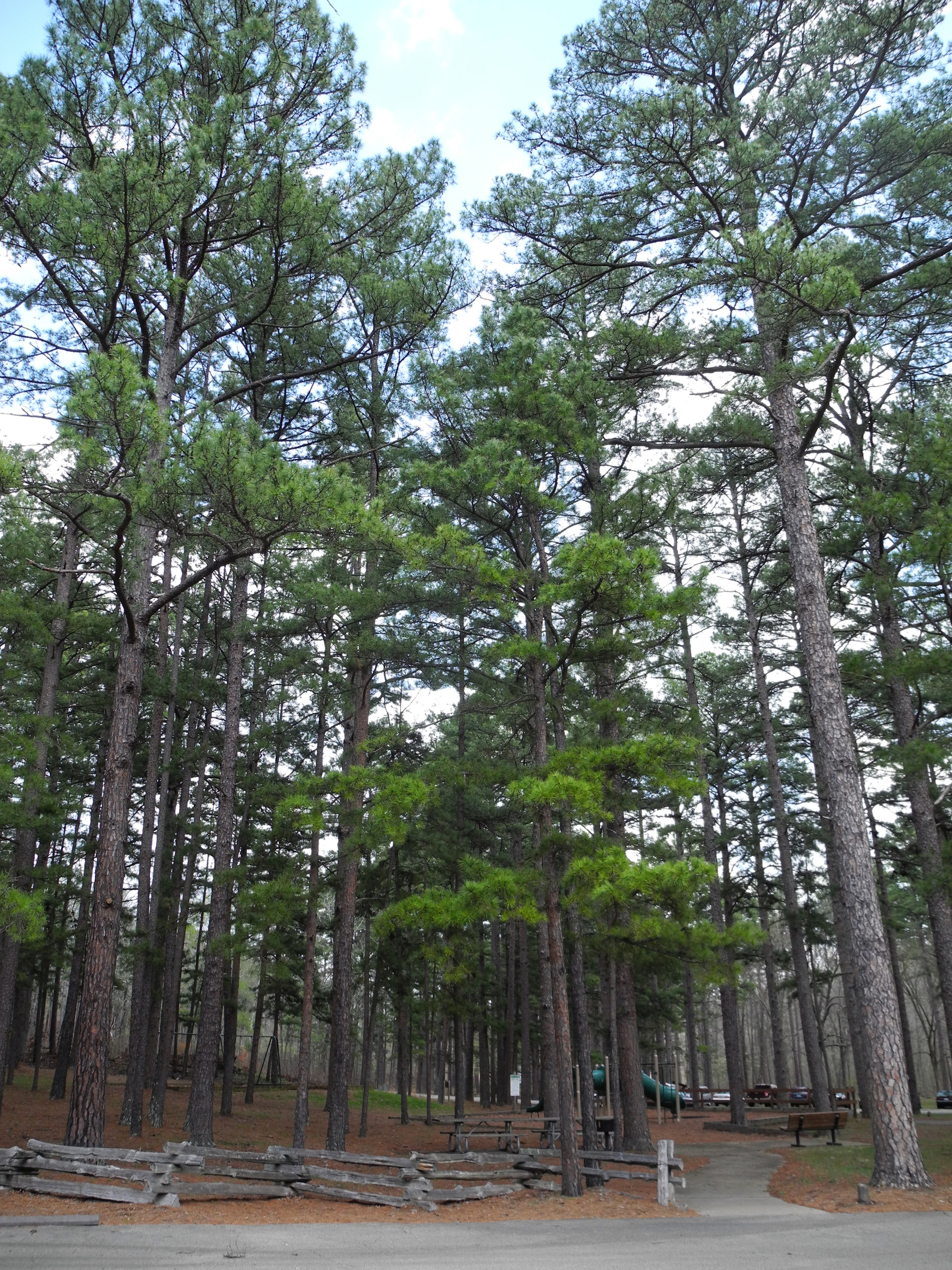
Hawn State Park

In Ste. Genevieve County of eastern Missouri, Route 144 begins at Route 32 in Millers. The route intersects Miller Switch Road and bends south. It heads south-southeast through rural land, crossing Janca Creek and approaching Hawn State Park. The road then enters the forests as it heads toward the park. Upon reaching Hawn Park Road, Route 144 turns eastward and parallels the northern boundary of the park. The route enters the park and turns east-northeastward before reaching its eastern terminus at Bauer Road. The road continues into the park as Park Drive. In 2012, Missouri Department of Transportation (MoDOT) calculated 152 vehicles traveling near the western terminus. This is expressed in terms of annual average daily traffic (AADT), a measure of traffic volume for any average day of the year.

== History ==
The short road was designated in 1972, from Route 32 to the Hawn State Park entrance. It was already paved in concrete, and has not been altered as of 2013.

== Major intersections ==
The entire route is in Ste. Genevieve County.

Location	mi	km	Destinations	Notes
Millers	0.000	0.000	Route 32	Western terminus
Hawn State Park	2.956	4.757	Bauer Road / Park Drive	Eastern terminus
1.000 mi = 1.609 km; 1.000 km = 0.621 mi
