= Staples Hollow =

Valley in the American state of Missouri

Staples Hollow is a valley in Ste. Genevieve County in the U.S. state of Missouri. The upper reaches of the valley lie just east of U.S. Route 61 north of Bloomsdale at 38°02′29″N 90°12′44″W and the valley stream flows northeast to enter the Mississippi River floodplain at Clement where it joins Establishment Creek at 38°03′28″N 90°09′59″W.

Staples Hollow has the name of the Staples family of settlers.
