= Establishment Creek =

Stream in the US state of Missouri

Establishment Creek is a stream in Ste. Genevieve County in the U.S. state of Missouri. It is a tributary of the Mississippi River.

The stream headwaters are at 37°52′02″N 90°17′53″W between the communities of Sprott and Millers and the stream crosses under U.S. Route 55 and U.S. Route 61 southeast of Bloomsdale. The confluence with the Mississippi is adjacent to the community of Clement at 38°01′40″N 90°06′45″W. The stream is impounded as Lake Wanda Lee just south of Rocky Ridge.

Establishment Creek was so named on account of pioneer settlement along its course, establishment meaning "settlement" in French.

== See also ==
- List of rivers of Missouri
