= Esek Hopkins House =

Historic house in Rhode Island, United States

- U.S. National Register of Historic Places
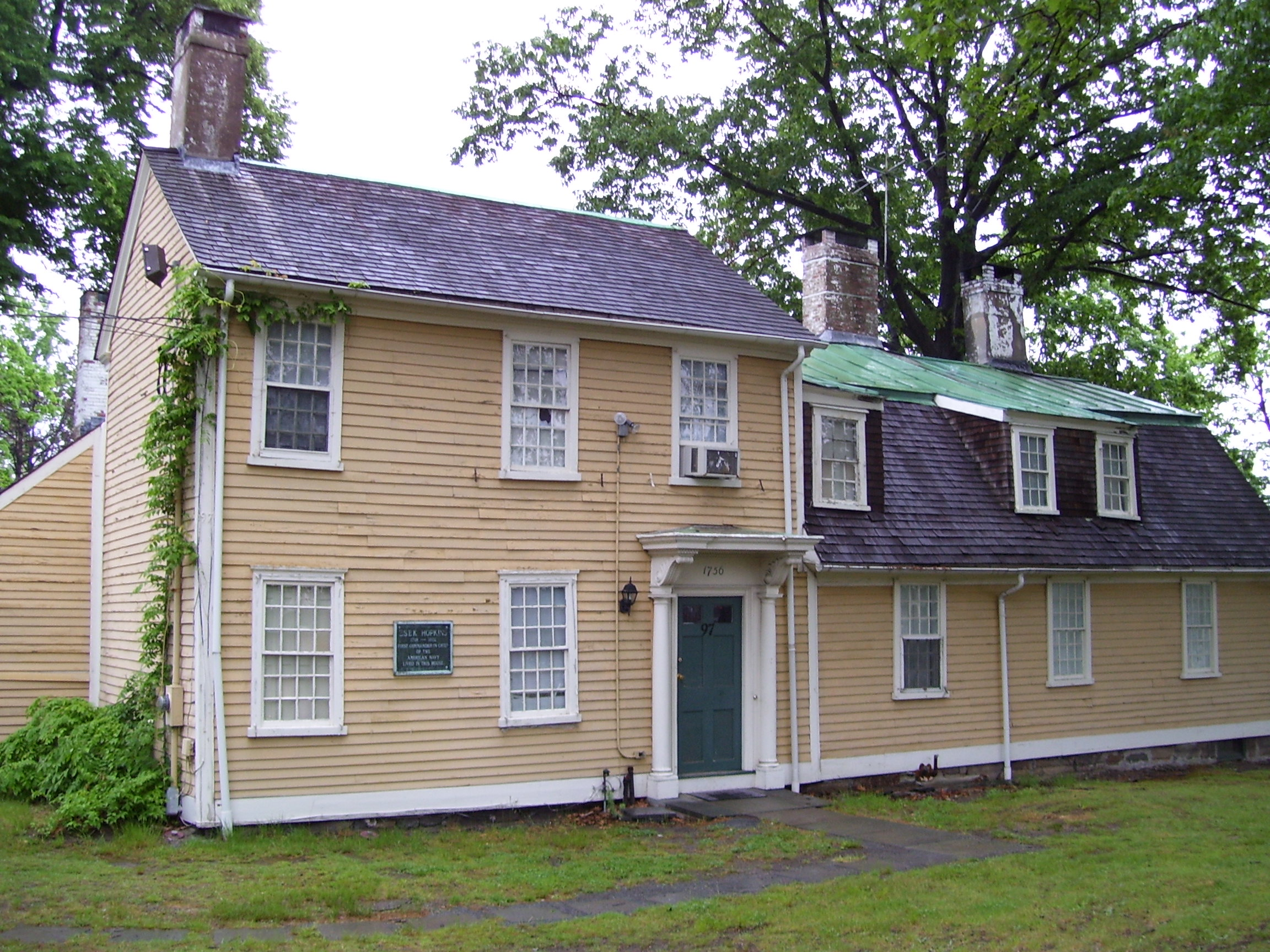

- Location within Rhode Island Location within the United States
- Location: 97 Admiral Street, Providence, RI
- Coordinates: 41°50′29″N 71°25′15″W
- Built: 1756
- NRHP reference No.: 73000071
- Added to NRHP: May 22, 1973

The Esek Hopkins House is an historic home on 97 Admiral Street (just off Route 146) on the north side of Providence, Rhode Island, United States.

== Description ==
The oldest portion of the house is a 2½-story gable-roof block, three bays wide, with an entry in the rightmost bay. To the right of this section is a 1½-story gambrel-roofed addition, dating to the early 19th century. A single-story gable-roof ell extends from the rear of the main block.

== History ==
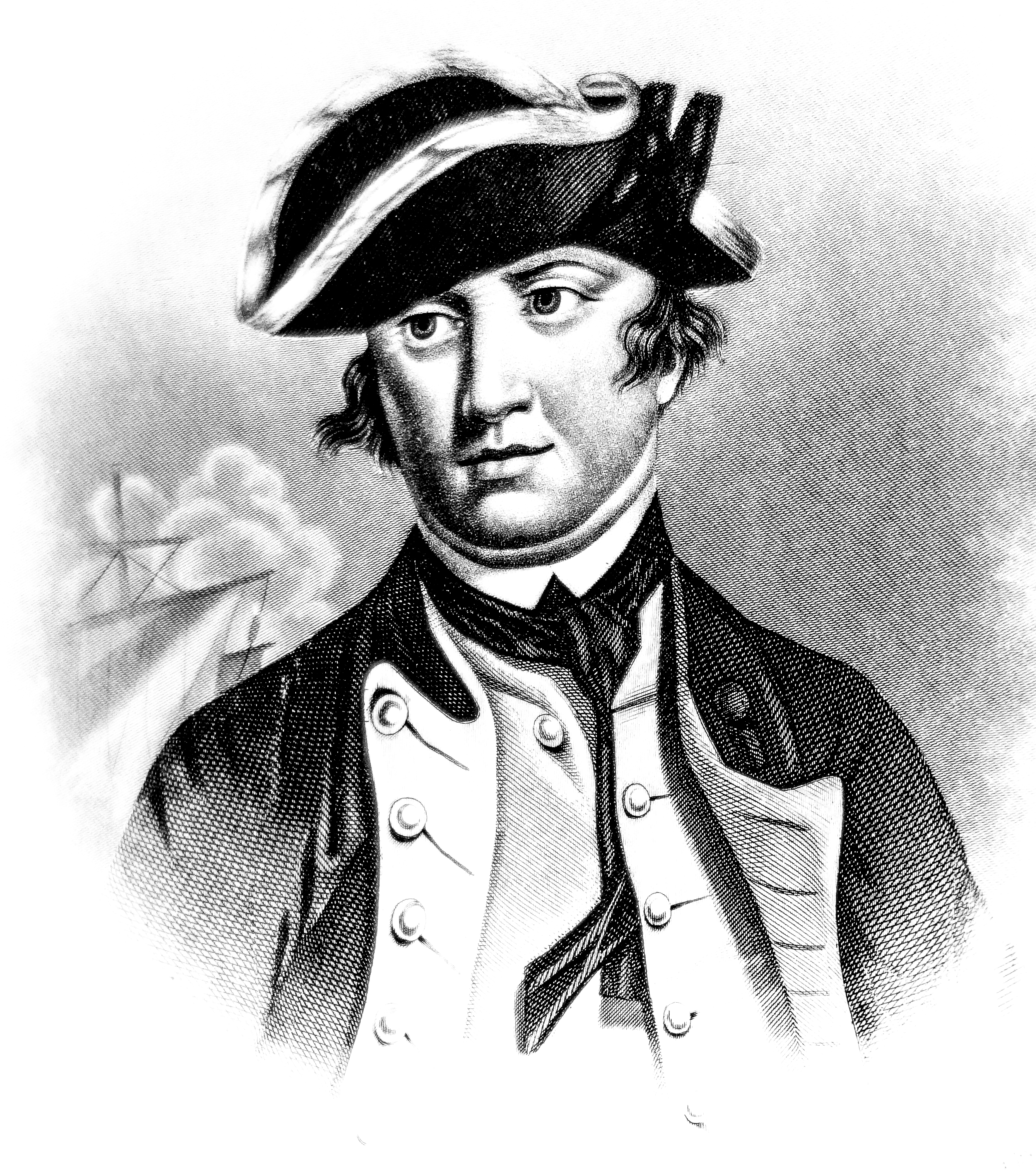
Commodore Esek Hopkins

Dating to 1754, the house was the home of Esek Hopkins, the first commander-in-chief of the Continental Navy during the American Revolutionary War. After Hopkins died, his daughters inherited the property, and it remained in the family for the next century. Descendant Elizabeth West Gould died in 1907, and the property was donated to the City of Providence in accordance with her wishes in 1908, with the stipulation that it be converted into a museum. Accounts of the time recounted that the property was being restored to its original condition.

The house was listed on the National Register of Historic Places in 1973. Over the years, various plans were put forward over the years to convert the house into a museum. They all failed for lack of resources. Most recently, in 2011 the Providence Parks department put forward a plan to convert the house into a part-time museum; this failed.

The building suffered from inadequate maintenance by the city's parks department, and was placed on the Providence Preservation Society's "Most Endangered Properties" list in 1995, 2011 and again in 2015.

In 2021, the Esek Hopkins house partnered with a local artist collective and a local dance company to serve as an outdoor space for dance performance and classes. In September 2021, the house was the site of an original dance opera titled "The Historical Fantasy of Esek Hopkins." The performance deals with the legacy of Hopkins and slavery and adds fantastical elements.

In 2024, the Esek Hopkins House was turned into a community center and events space.

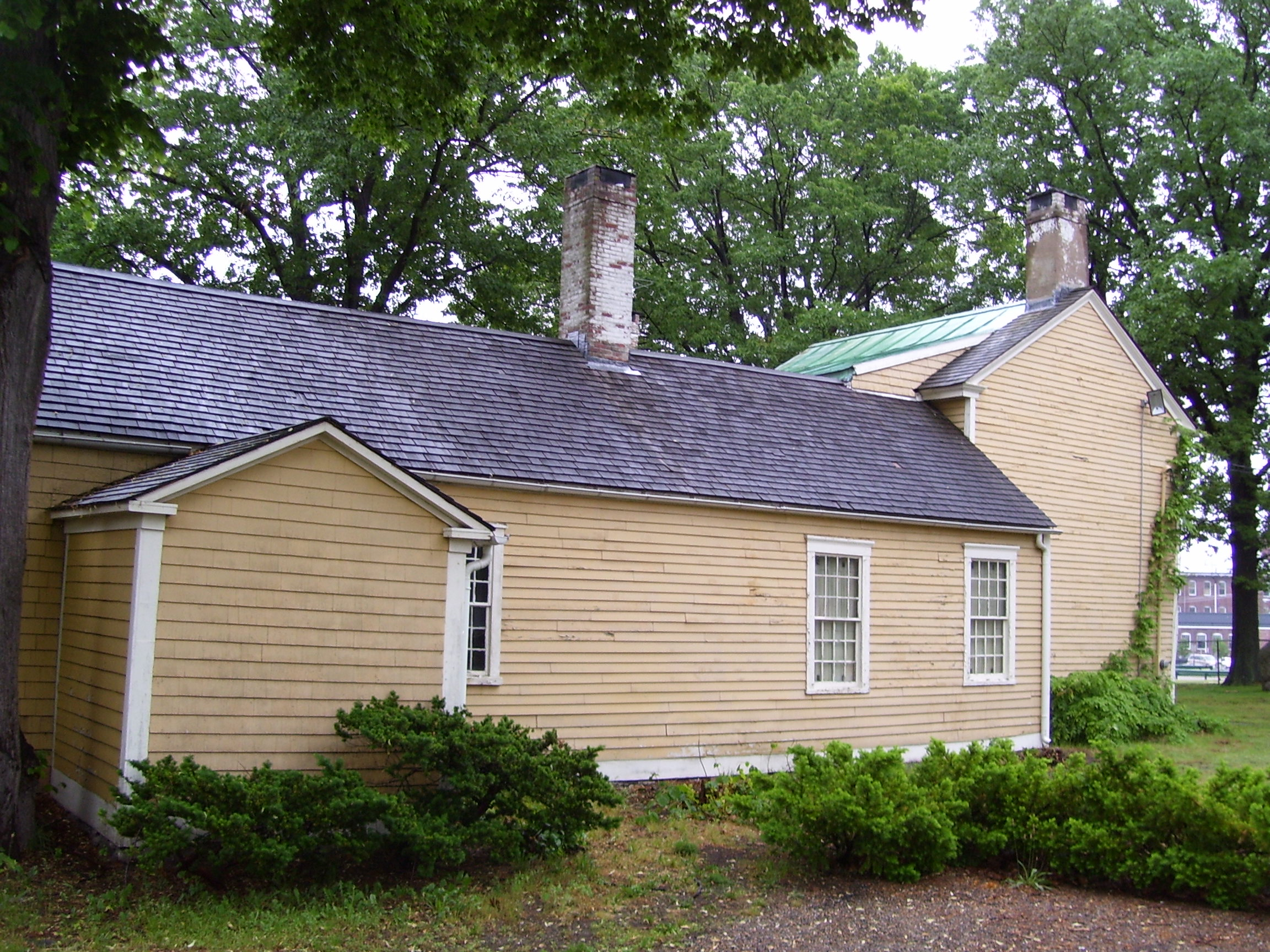
side of Esek Hopkins House

== See also ==
- National Register of Historic Places listings in Providence, Rhode Island

== References and external links ==
- "Old Providence: A Collection of Facts and Traditions relating to Various Buildings and Sites of Historic Interest in Providence" (Merchants National Bank of Providence, 1918)
