= List of highways numbered 145 =

The following highways are numbered 145:

== Australia ==
- Lower Barrington Road, Paloona Road, Melrose Road, Bellamy Road, Forthside Road (Tasmania)
- Inverleigh–Winchelsea Road (Victoria)

== Canada ==
- Winnipeg Route 145
- New Brunswick Route 145
- Prince Edward Island Route 145

== Costa Rica ==
- National Route 145

== Japan ==
- Japan National Route 145
- Fukuoka Prefectural Route 145
- Nara Prefectural Route 145

== Malaysia ==
- Malaysia Federal Route 145

== United Kingdom ==
- A145 road
- B145 road

== United States ==
- Alabama State Route 145
- Arkansas Highway 145
- California State Route 145
  - County Route 145 (California)
- Colorado State Highway 145
- Connecticut Route 145
- Florida State Road 145
  - County Road 145 (Hamilton County, Florida)
- Georgia State Route 145
- Hawaii Route 145
- Illinois Route 145
- Indiana State Road 145
- Iowa Highway 145 (former)
- Kentucky Route 145
- Louisiana Highway 145
- Maine State Route 145
- Maryland Route 145
- Massachusetts Route 145
- M-145 (Michigan highway) (former)
- Mississippi Highway 145
- Missouri Route 145
- New Hampshire Route 145
- New Mexico State Road 145
- New York State Route 145
  - County Route 145 (Broome County, New York)
  - County Route 145 (Fulton County, New York)
  - County Route 145 (Herkimer County, New York)
  - County Route 145 (Rensselaer County, New York)
  - County Route 145 (Schenectady County, New York)
- North Carolina Highway 145
- Ohio State Route 145
- Oklahoma State Highway 145
- Pennsylvania Route 145
- South Carolina Highway 145
- Tennessee State Route 145
- Texas State Highway 145 (former)
  - Texas State Highway Loop 145
  - Texas State Highway Spur 145 (former)
  - Farm to Market Road 145
- Utah State Route 145
  - Utah State Route 145 (1933-1969) (former)
- Virginia State Route 145
- Wisconsin Highway 145

Territories

- Puerto Rico Highway 145

Preceded by 144	Lists of highways 145	Succeeded by 146
