= Union Township, Ste. Genevieve County, Missouri =

Union Township
- Civil Township
- Location of Ste. Genevieve County
- Coordinates: 37°52′45″N 90°19′44″W
- Country: United States
- State: Missouri
- County: Ste. Genevieve
- Established

Area
  - Total: 92 sq mi (240 km^{2})
  - Land: 91.9 sq mi (238 km^{2})
  - Water: 0.6 sq mi (1.6 km^{2}) 0.85%
- GNIS Feature ID: 767328

Union Township is a subdivision of Ste. Genevieve County, Missouri, in the United States of America, and is one of the five townships located in Ste. Genevieve County.

== Name ==
The origin of the name is not certain, but may be connected to President Andrew Jackson's championship of national unity.

== History ==
Union Township was formed in 1834 out of the western portion of Jackson Township.

== Populated places ==
There are several communities in Union Township. The only incorporated community, Grayhawk, has a population of 408.

- Grayhawk
- Jonca
- Sprott

The township also contains 6 churches: Chestnut Ridge Baptist Church, Fairview Church, Genevieve Church, Little Vine Church, Salem Church, and Three Rivers Baptist Church, as well as the following cemeteries: Doss, Haile, Jenning, Mackley, McClintock, McGee, Murphy, and Oakland.

== Geography ==
Union Township is located in the western portion of Ste. Genevieve County. A number of streams run through the township: Bear Creek, Hickory Creek, North Fork Jonca Creek, and South Fork Jonca Creek. The following lakes are found in the township: Erb Lake, Hart Lake, Lake Genevieve, Lake Ocie, Lake Wanda Lee, Lake Ski, Tragden Lake, and Trautman Lake.

== 2000 census ==
The 2000 census shows Union Township consisting of 2,596 individuals. The racial makeup of the town was 2,555 (98.42%) White, 10 (0.38%) African American, 23 (0.88%) Native American and Alaska Native, 2 (0.07%) Asian, and 6 (0.23%) from two or more races.

== 2010 census ==
As of the census of 2010, there were 1,399 housing units consisting of 2,779 people, with a population density of 30.5 per square mile residing in the township. Males number 1,294 and make up 50.3% of the population, while females number 1,278 and make up 49.7%. The median age for men is 30.8 years and for women is 37.9. The racial makeup of the town was 2,738 (98.52)% White, 11 (0.40%) African American, 13 (0.47%) Native American and Alaska Native, 1 (0.04%) Asian, and 7 (0.25%) from other races, and 9 (0.32%) from two or more races.

The average household size 2.79 persons. The estimated median household income in 2009 was $43,429 ($36,425 in 1999). 13% of the residents have an income below the poverty rate.

== Other Union townships ==
The Geographic Names Information System (GNIS) records 33 townships named Union in various counties of Missouri.
