= Rough Creek (Missouri) =

Stream in the American state of Missouri

Coordinates: 37.857553°N 90.217063°W

Rough Creek is a stream in Ste. Genevieve County in the U.S. state of Missouri. It is a tributary of Jonca Creek.

Rough Creek was so named on account of the uneven terrain near its course.

== See also ==
- List of rivers of Missouri
