= Clement, Missouri =

- unincorporated community
- Location of Ste. Genevieve County, Missouri
- Coordinates: 38°3′25″N 90°9′55″W
- Country: United States
- State: Missouri
- County: Sainte Genevieve
- Township: Jackson
- Elevation: 384 ft (117 m)
- Time zone: UTC-6 (Central (CST))
  - Summer (DST): UTC-5 (CDT)
- ZIP code: 63670
- Area code: 573
- FIPS code: 29-14740
- GNIS feature ID: 740749

Clement is an unincorporated community in Jackson Township in southeastern Sainte Genevieve County, Missouri, United States. It is situated near the Mississippi River, approximately eight miles northwest of Ste. Genevieve. The community was also referred to as Establishment in the past due to its proximity to Establishment Creek and the adjacent Establishment Island in the Mississippi floodplain. A small stream in Staples Hollow joins Establishment Creek at the site.

The current name is derived from the people who had a fishing club at the site. A post office called Clement was established in 1909, and remained in operation until 1911.
