= List of highways numbered 146A =

The following highways are numbered 146A:

== United States ==
- County Route 146A (Lee County, Alabama)
- Maryland Route 146A
- Massachusetts Route 146A
- New York State Route 146A
- Rhode Island Route 146A

== See also ==
- List of highways numbered 146
