= List of abolitionists involved with slavery or slave trading =

A list of people during the period of Transatlantic Slavery and post-Transatlantic period, who traded slaves to make personal profit, or who owned slaves and used them for personal gain. Later, realizing the evils of these practices became abolitionists of either the slave trade, abolishing the institution of slavery, or abolishing both. Some abolitionists manumitted every one of their slaves while becoming an abolitionist while other slave owners maintained ownership of some slaves during the same time seeing the need for abolitionism and promoting its cause.

Name	Country	Details
John Newton	British Empire	A sailor and deck hand on many slave ships, later became captain of his own slave ship for about 4 years. After converting to Christianity, wrote one of the most beloved Hymns of all time, Amazing Grace.
Benjamin Franklin	Pennsylvania	Inherited slaves from his family, later purchased others. Advertised slave sales in his papers. Became an abolitionist during the time of the American Revolution, was eventually elected President of the Pennsylvania Abolition Society after 1785 for his staunch opposition of owning slaves.
Cassius Marcellus Clay	United States	Inherited slaves from his family, and manumitted some slaves as a young adult. A staunch abolitionist, Clay kept some slaves that were only eventually freed after the end of slavery with the conclusion of the American Civil War. Clay was a supporter of the gradual abolition of slavery.
Toussaint Louverture	Saint-Domingue	Born a slave, Louverture eventually was manumitted and purchased slaves of his own. Realized the evils of slaving and supported the abolition of slavery which was achieved in 1794. Later, Haiti was founded as a free country.
Simón Bolívar	Spanish Empire	Inherited slaves from his family, later realized the evils of the practice and upon becoming an independence leader manumitted all of his slaves.
Lucien Anderson	United States	Owned slaves at the time he voted for the Thirteenth Amendment to the United States Constitution.
Robert Carter III	Virginia	Known for the largest manumission in Colonial American history.
Robert Pleasants	Virginia	Inherited slaves and eventually manumitted them while promoting abolitionist causes.
Joseph Foster Barham II	Jamaica	British plantation owner in the West Indies who later changed his mind to support gradual abolitionism, published the pamphlet Considerations on the abolition of Negro slavery, and the means of practically effecting it.
Moses Brown	Rhode Island	Plantation owner from British Rhode Island who attempted to expand in to slave trading on the slave ship Sally but on an initial voyage ran into disaster. This experience led Brown to not only change his mind on slave trading but also to eventually manumit all of his slaves and become an ardent abolitionist.
Alexander Falconbridge	British Empire	A surgeon on board slave ships. Later rejected slave trading and became an abolitionist, publishing an influential book exposing the horrors he observed.
