= USS Hopkins (SP-3294) =

Patrol vessel of the United States Navy

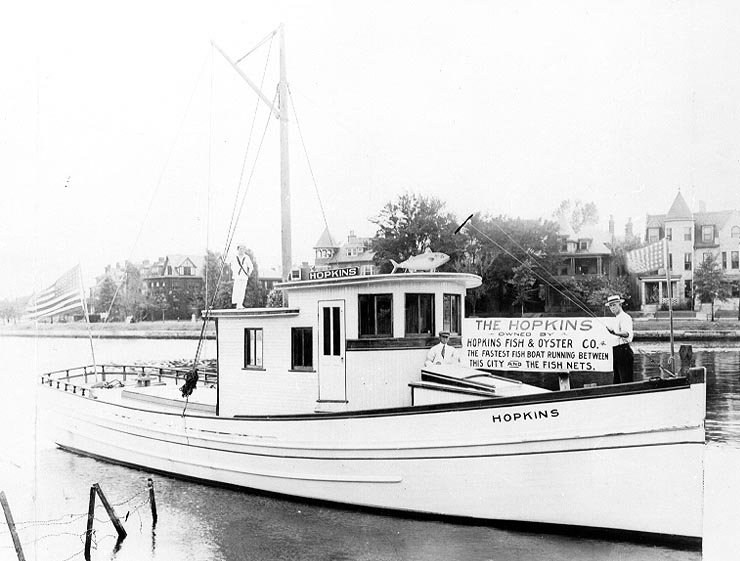
- An advertising photograph Hopkins as a commercial fishing boat, probably taken at Norfolk, Virginia, in 1917. The sign describes her as "the fastest fish boat running between this city and the fish nets."

History

United States
- Name: USS Hopkins
- Namesake: Previous name retained
- Builder: Hahnes Company, Portsmouth, Virginia
- Launched: 1917
- Completed: 1917
- Acquired: 1 September 1918
- Commissioned: 3 October 1918
- Fate: Transferred to U.S. Department of War 4 March 1920
- Notes: Operated as commercial fishing boat Hopkins 1917–1918

General characteristics
- Type: Patrol vessel
- Tonnage: 34 Gross register tons
- Length: 62 ft 10 in (19.15 m)
- Beam: 16 ft (4.9 m)
- Draft: 4 ft (1.2 m)
- Speed: 10.4 or 11 knots

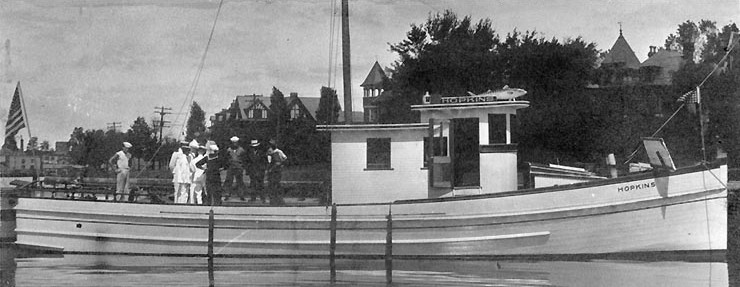
Hopkins as a commercial fishing boat, probably at the time of her inspection by the 5th Naval District at Norfolk, Virginia, on 20 August 1918 for possible naval service because United States Navy personnel are on her decks.

USS Hopkins (SP-3294) was a United States Navy patrol vessel in commission from 1918 to 1920. She was the second of three Navy vessels named in honor of Commodore of the Continental Navy Esek Hopkins.

== History ==
Hopkins was built as a commercial fishing boat for the Hopkins Fish and Oyster Company of Norfolk, Virginia, in 1917 by the Hahnes Company at Portsmouth, Virginia; she was both launched and completed that year.

The 5th Naval District inspected her at Norfolk on 20 August 1918 for possible naval service, and on 1 September 1918 was purchased by the U.S. Navy for use as a section patrol boat during World War I. She was commissioned on 3 October 1918 as USS Hopkins (SP-3294).

Assigned to the 5th Naval District, Hopkins performed harbor patrol and other harbor duties at Norfolk. She was transferred to the United States Department of War on 4 March 1920.
