= Pickle Creek =

Stream in the American state of Missouri

Coordinates: 37°50′16″N 90°12′06″W

Pickle Creek is a stream in Ste. Genevieve County in the U.S. state of Missouri. It is a tributary of the River aux Vases which it joins at the east boundary of Hawn State Park.

Pickle Creek has the name of William Pickles, the original owner of the site.

== See also ==
- List of rivers of Missouri
