= USS Hopkins (DD-249) =

Clemson-class destroyer

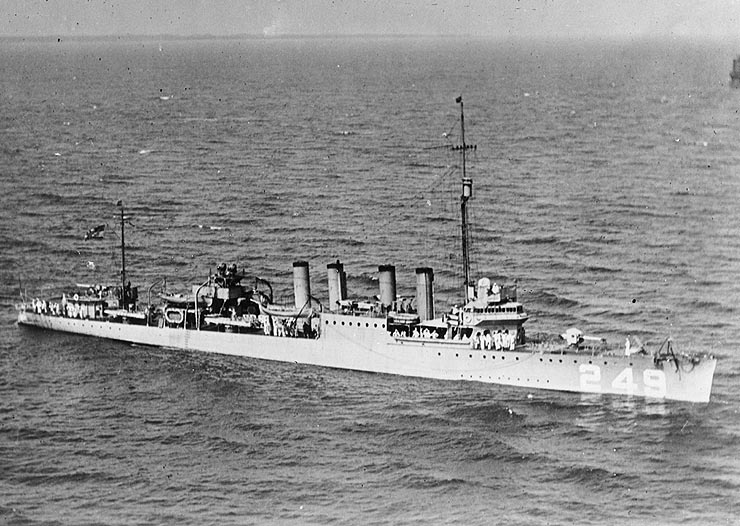

History

United States
- Namesake: Esek Hopkins
- Builder: New York Shipbuilding
- Laid down: 30 July 1919
- Launched: 26 June 1920
- Commissioned: 21 March 1921
- Decommissioned: 21 December 1945
- Stricken: 8 January 1946
- Fate: Sold for scrapping, 8 November 1946

General characteristics
- Class & type: Clemson-class destroyer
- Displacement: 1,190 tons
- Length: 314 feet 5 inches (95.83 m)
- Beam: 31 feet 8 inches (9.65 m)
- Draft: 9 feet 3 inches (2.82 m)
- Propulsion: 26,500 shp (20 MW); geared turbines, 2 screws
- Speed: 35 knots (65 km/h)
- Range: 4,900 nm @ 15 kn (9,100 km @ 28 km/h)
- Complement: 101 officers and enlisted
- Armament: 4 x 4 in (100 mm) guns, 1 x 3 in (76 mm) gun, 12 x 21 inch (533 mm) tt.

USS Hopkins (DD-249/DMS-13) was a Clemson-class destroyer built in 1920 and in United States Navy service between 1921 and 1946. The third Navy ship named in honor of Commodore of the Continental Navy Esek Hopkins, she saw extensive action in the Pacific Theatre during World War II, emerging the most decorated Clemson-class warship of that conflict.

== Construction and commissioning ==
Hopkins was launched 26 June 1920 by the New York Shipbuilding Corporation, one of 156 Clemson-class destroyers built. She was sponsored by Miss Sarah Babbitt, a descendant of Commodore of the Continental Navy Esek Hopkins; and commissioned 21 March 1921 at Philadelphia.

== Service history ==
After shakedown Hopkins arrived at Newport, Rhode Island, 31 May for battle practice training during the summer. In November, she was assigned to Destroyer Squadron 15 for tactical training with the Atlantic Fleet along the East Coast.

Hopkins sailed from Hampton Roads 2 October 1922, and reached Constantinople 22 October for duty in Turkish waters. She protected American interests and cooperated with the relief mission in the Near East, ranging to Beirut, Jaffa, and Smyrna. She departed Constantinople 18 May 1923 for New York, arriving 12 June. For the next seven years, Hopkins operated out of New England ports in the summer, Charleston, South Carolina, in the winter, and the Caribbean Sea in the spring. During the spring of 1930, Hopkins participated in force battle practice with aircraft.

On 3 February 1932, Hopkins was one of the two naval ships rendering medical aid to earthquake victims at Santiago, Cuba. She departed 5 February to join the Pacific Fleet at San Diego, California. She had escort duty for President Franklin D. Roosevelt's cruise to Canada in July 1936, then resumed training along the Western Seaboard.

Hopkins returned to Norfolk, Virginia in April 1939, and performed Neutrality Patrol from September 1939 until sailing for San Diego 37 May, and from there to Pearl Harbor. She converted to a high-speed minesweeper (DMS-13) in the Pearl Harbor Naval Shipyard.

=== World War II ===
When the Japanese attacked Pearl Harbor, Hopkins was at Johnston Island for war maneuvers, but immediately headed back to Hawaii. She continued patrol of the Hawaiian Sea Frontier, with a short break for overhaul in the States, until late summer 1942, when she joined the invasion fleet bound for Guadalcanal. As America's first offensive of the Pacific war began 7 August, Hopkins swept the transport area and covered the landings on Tulagi. During a heavy enemy air attack 9 August, she shot down two enemy planes, and in the following months, Hopkins escorted transports, swept mines, and carried badly needed supplies to Guadalcanal.

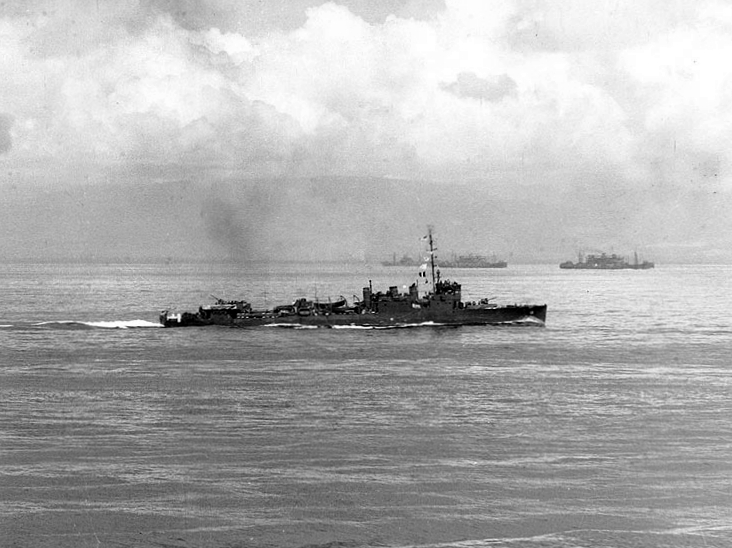
Hopkins off Guadalcanal, 8 August 1942. Eventually earning two Navy Unit Commendations and 10 battle stars, she became the most decorated of the 156-ship Clemson-class destroyers to serve in World War II

Hopkins served as flagship for Admiral Richmond K. Turner as the Russell Islands were invaded 21 February 1943. During the action, she shot down a Japanese plane. Remaining in the southwest Pacific, she joined in the initial invasion of Rice Anchorage, New Georgia, 4 July, and of Bougainville 1 November. Convoy escort, antisubmarine patrol, and sweeping duties kept the destroyer busy until the Solomon Islands were secured.

As the Navy moved farther across the Pacific in the island-hopping campaign, Hopkins arrived off Saipan 13 June 1944 to sweep the invasion approaches. She provided screen and fire support for the amphibious landings of 15 June 1944. She picked up 62 prisoners from sunken Japanese ships as well as rescuing a downed fighter pilot and a seaplane crew. A brief rest at Eniwetok was followed by a role in the capture of Guam. Hopkins reached that important Marianas island 14 July to participate in the preinvasion sweeping and bombardment. She also gave fire-support to the landings 16 July.

Following overhaul at San Francisco, CA, Hopkins arrived in Leyte Gulf 27 December 1944 to prepare for the Lingayen landings. The minesweepers sailed 2 January 1945 to sweep Lingayen Gulf under attack from Japanese dive bombers and kamikazes. When her sister ship Palmer was hit and sank in 13 minutes the morning of 7 January, Hopkins rescued 94 survivors.

Hopkins departed the Philippines 15 January 1945 for a brief rest at Eniwetok, then swept the transport areas and channels off Iwo Jima to prepare for invasion 19 February 1945. She remained on patrol off Iwo Jima, emerging from heavy air and shore fire unscathed. Departing Iwo Jima 6 March, Hopkins next headed into battle off Okinawa, the "last stepping stone to Japan." While fighting off the constant raids and suicide attacks she shot down several Japanese planes. On 4 May 1945 she was struck a glancing blow by a burning kamikaze just before it plunged into the sea. There was one casualty during this attack. Coxswain Morris Dee Garrett was the only casualty on that day and was the only casualty from the USS Hopkins during World War II.

On 7 June 1945, Hopkins steamed for overhaul at Leyte, Philippine Islands where she remained until cessation of hostilities. Hopkins then rendezvoused with units of the 3rd Fleet headed for Tokyo Bay. After two days of sweeping the entrances to Tokyo Bay, Hopkins anchored in sight of Mount Fuji 30 August 1945. Hopkins rode out two typhoons with winds raging to 125 knots before her departure from Tokyo Bay 10 October 1945 for the Eastern Seaboard of the United States.

Hopkins arrived in Norfolk 28 November and decommissioned there 21 December 1945. She was sold for scrapping 8 November 1946 to Heglo Sales Corporation, Hillsdale, New Jersey.

== Awards ==
Hopkins was awarded two Navy Unit Commendations for heroism off Guadalcanal and in Lingayen Gulf. She also received 10 battle stars for her service in World War II. Hopkins is the most decorated member of the Clemson-class destroyers.
