= Jonca, Missouri =

Unincorporated community in Missouri, U.S.

Coordinates: 37°50′14″N 90°17′56″W

Jonca is an unincorporated community in Ste. Genevieve County, in the U.S. state of Missouri.

== History ==
A post office called Jonca was established in 1880, and remained in operation until 1906. The community took its name from Jonca Creek.
