= M-144 (Michigan highway) =

M-144 was the designation given to two former state trunkline highways in the U.S. state of Michigan:

- M-144 (1937–1939 Michigan highway) in East Lansing
- M-144 (1940–1973 Michigan highway) between Roscommon and Luzerne

Browse numbered routes
| ← M-143 | MI | → M-146 |
