= List of highways numbered 146 =

The following highways are numbered 146:

== Brazil ==
- BR-146

== Canada ==
- Prince Edward Island Route 146

== Costa Rica ==
- National Route 146

== France ==
- Route nationale 146

== India ==
- National Highway 146 (India)

== Japan ==
- Japan National Route 146
- Fukuoka Prefectural Route 146
- Nara Prefectural Route 146

== Malaysia ==
- Malaysia Federal Route 146

== United Kingdom ==
- A146 road
- B146 road

== United States ==
- Alabama State Route 146
- Arkansas Highway 146
- California State Route 146
- Connecticut Route 146
- Florida State Road 146 (former)
  - County Road 146 (Hamilton County, Florida)
  - County Road 146 (Jefferson County, Florida)
  - County Road 146 (Leon County, Florida)
  - County Road 146 (Madison County, Florida)
- Georgia State Route 146
- Illinois Route 146
- Indiana State Road 146 (former)
- Iowa Highway 146
- K-146 (Kansas highway)
- Kentucky Route 146
- Louisiana Highway 146
- Maine State Route 146
- Maryland Route 146
- Massachusetts Route 146
- M-146 (Michigan highway) (former)
- Missouri Route 146
- Nevada State Route 146
- New Mexico State Road 146
- New York State Route 146
  - County Route 146 (Cayuga County, New York)
  - County Route 146 (Onondaga County, New York)
  - County Route 146 (Seneca County, New York)
- North Carolina Highway 146
- Ohio State Route 146
- Oklahoma State Highway 146
- Pennsylvania Route 146
- Rhode Island Route 146
- South Carolina Highway 146
- Tennessee State Route 146
- Texas State Highway 146
  - Texas State Highway Loop 146 (former)
  - Texas State Highway Spur 146
  - Farm to Market Road 146
- Utah State Route 146 (1933–2014) (former)
- Virginia State Route 146
  - Virginia State Route 146 (1933-1949) (former)
- Wisconsin Highway 146

Territories

- Puerto Rico Highway 146

== See also ==
- List of highways numbered 146A

Preceded by 145	Lists of highways 146	Succeeded by 147
