= Jonca Creek =

Stream in the US state of Missouri

Jonca Creek is a stream in Ste. Genevieve County in the U.S. state of Missouri. It is a tributary to the River aux Vases.

The stream begins at the junction of the North and South Fork tributary streams at 37°50′33″N 90°16′46″W at an elevation of approximately 750 feet. The source area is one quarter mile east of Missouri Route 32 and the stream flows generally to the east. The stream flows past the north side of Hawn State Park and south of the community of Millers. The stream confluence with the River aux Vases is at 37°52′11″N 90°09′11″W and elevation of 443 feet.

Jonca Creek most likely has the name of a pioneer citizen.

== See also ==
- List of rivers of Missouri
