= Rough Creek (Conasauga River tributary) =

Stream in Georgia, U.S.

Coordinates: 34°54′15.29″N 84°37′55.76″W

Rough Creek is a stream in the U.S. state of Georgia. It is a tributary to the Conasauga River.

Rough Creek was so named on account of the uneven terrain near its course.
