= Millers, Missouri =

- unincorporated community
- Location of Ste. Genevieve County, Missouri
- Coordinates: 37°51′38″N 90°16′13″W
- Country: United States
- State: Missouri
- County: Sainte Genevieve
- Township: Union
- Elevation: 896 ft (273 m)
- Time zone: UTC-6 (Central (CST))
  - Summer (DST): UTC-5 (CDT)
- ZIP code: 63670
- Area code: 573
- FIPS code: 29-48325
- GNIS feature ID: 741068

Millers is an unincorporated community in Union Township in western Sainte Genevieve County, Missouri, United States. It is situated approximately 15 miles southwest of Ste. Genevieve. The community started out as a switch spur of the Missouri-Illinois Railroad between Weingarten and Sprott on the property of L. R. Miller.
