= Hawn State Park =

State park in Missouri, United States

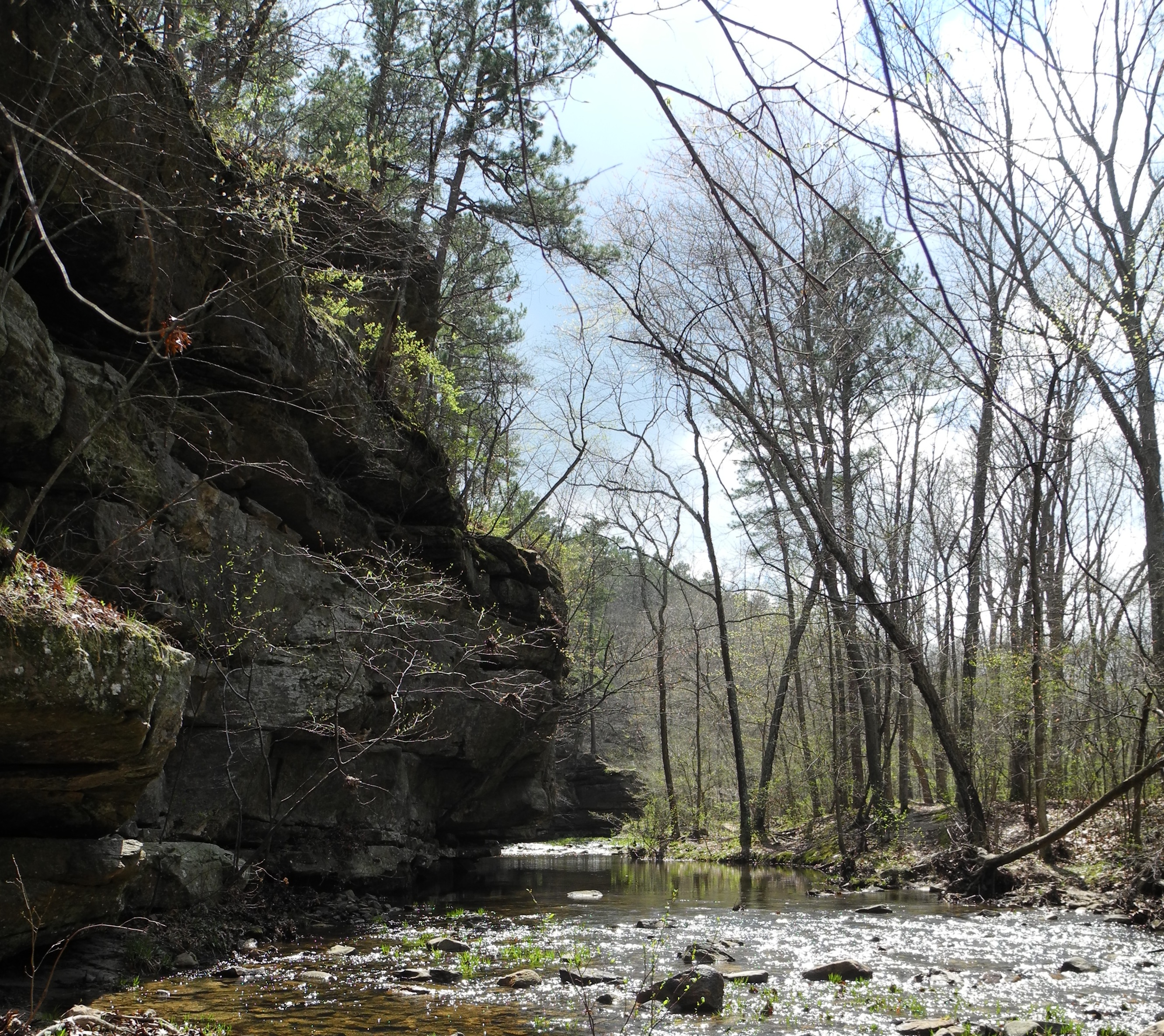

- Location within Missouri Location within the United States
- Location: Ste. Genevieve County, Missouri, United States
- Coordinates: 37°50′16″N 90°12′06″W
- Area: 4,955.66 acres (2,005.48 ha)
- Elevation: 623 ft (190 m)
- Established: 1955
- Administrator: Missouri Department of Natural Resources
- Visitors: 111,110 (in 2022)
- Named for: Helen Coffer Hawn
- Website: Official website

Hawn State Park is a public recreation area located 14 miles (23 km) southwest of Ste. Genevieve, Missouri. The state park's nearly 5,000 acres (2,000 ha) include three state-designated natural areas: Pickle Creek, LaMotte Sandstone Barrens, and Botkins Pine Woods. Orchid Valley is also considered part of Hawn State Park, but is not connected to the rest of the park and is not open to the public.

== History ==
The park's first 1500 acres were willed to the state in 1952 by the school teacher for whom the park is named, Helen Coffer Hawn. She acquired twelve parcels for purposes of creating a park beginning in 1932.

== Activities and amenities ==
The park offers camping, fishing, picnicking, and hiking on named trails including Whispering Pines, White Oak, and Pickle Creek. The trail system intersects the River aux Vases and its tributary Pickle Creek.
