= Sprott, Missouri =

- unincorporated community
- Location of Ste. Genevieve County, Missouri
- Coordinates: 37°51′50″N 90°19′42″W
- Country: United States
- State: Missouri
- County: Sainte Genevieve
- Township: Union

Sprott is an unincorporated community located in Union Township in Sainte Genevieve County, Missouri, United States. Sprott is located approximately nineteen miles southwest of Sainte Genevieve.

A post office called Sprott was established in 1902, and remained in operation until 1918. The town was named after John Sprott, a local merchant.
