= Esek Hopkins =

American privateer, politician and military officer (1718-1802)

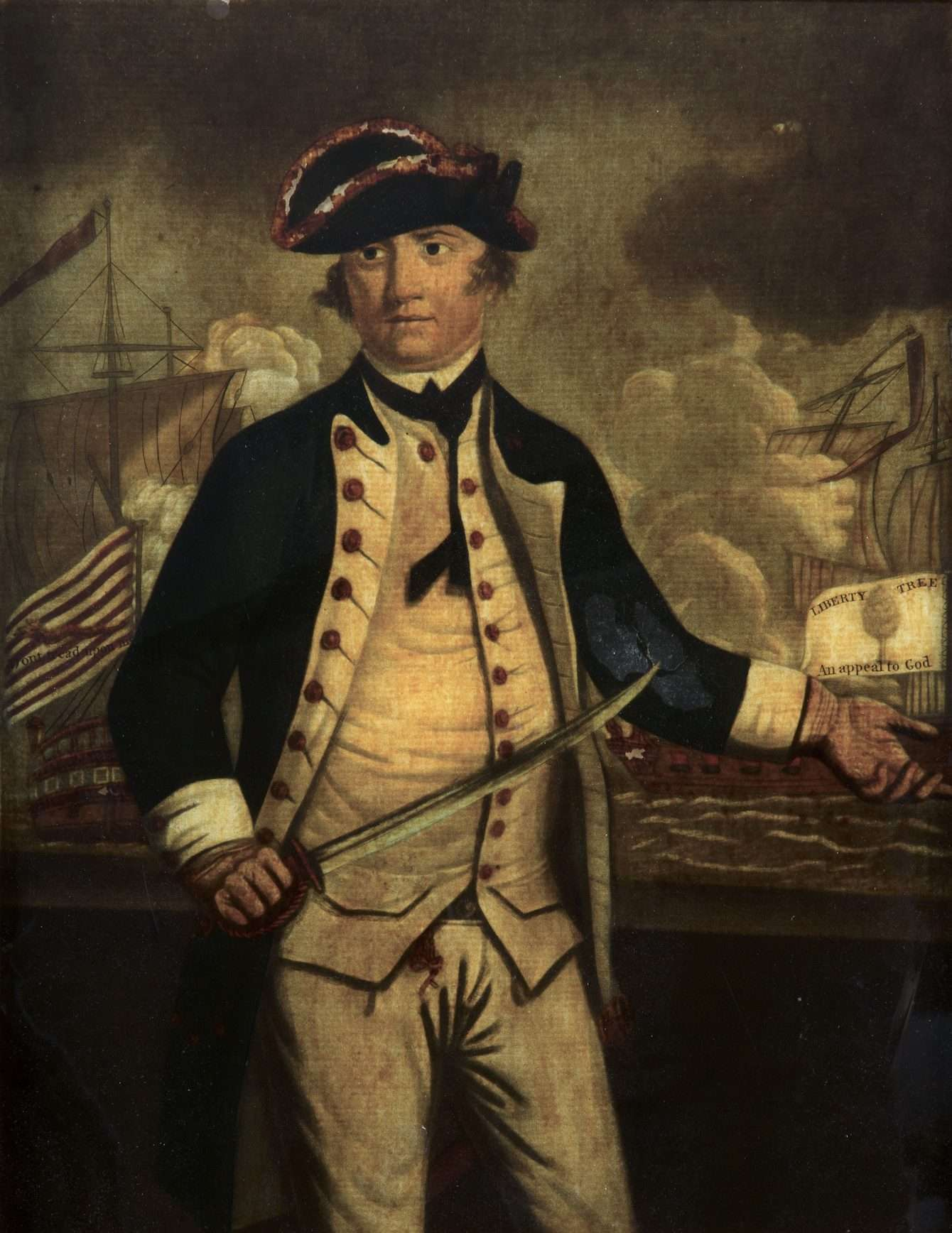
- 1776 portrait
- Born: April 26, 1718; Scituate, Rhode Island
- Died: February 26, 1802 (aged 83); Providence, Rhode Island
- Burial place: Providence, Rhode Island
- Spouse: Desire Burroughs
- Military career
- Allegiance: Rhode Island; United Colonies; United States
- Branch: Continental Navy; Rhode Island militia
- Service years: 1754–1763 (Rhode Island); 1775–1778 (United Colonies and United States)
- Rank: Captain (Privateer); Commodore (Continental Navy); Brigadier general (Rhode Island militia)
- Conflicts: French and Indian War; American Revolutionary War; Raid of Nassau; Battle of Block Island

Signature
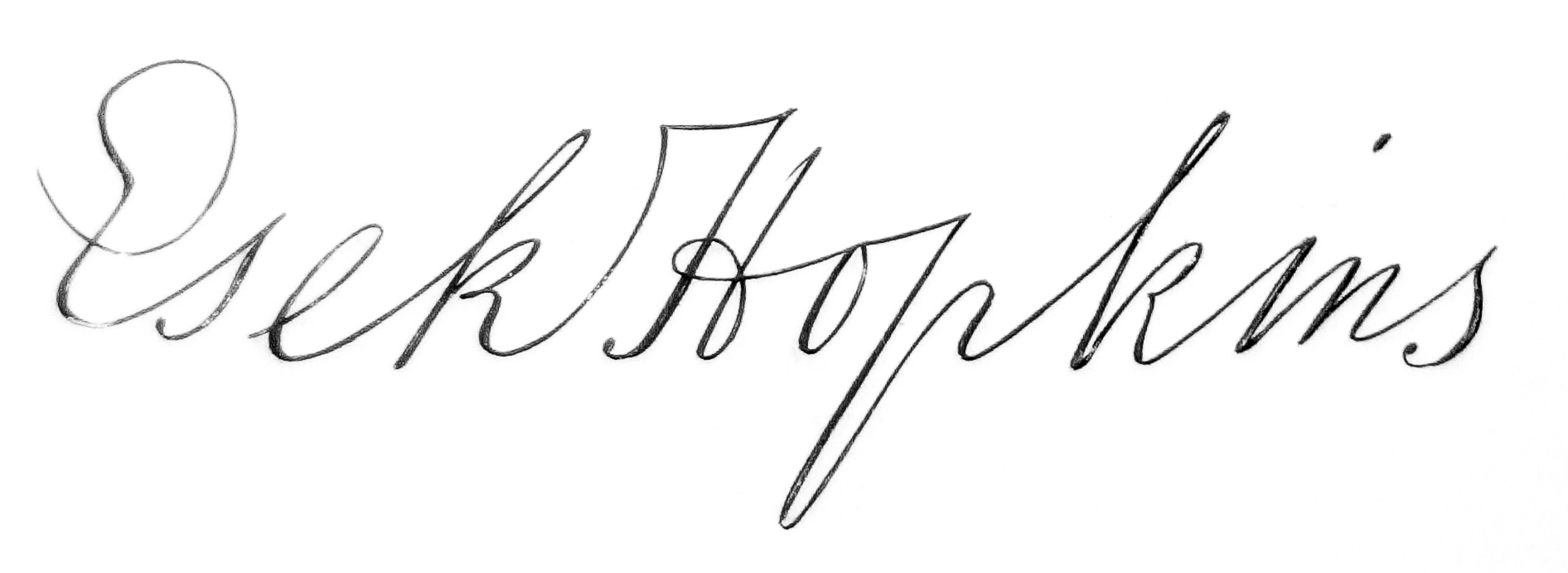

Esek Hopkins (April 26, 1718 – February 26, 1802) was an American privateer, politician and military officer. He served as the only commander-in-chief of the Continental Navy during the American Revolutionary War, when the Continental Congress appointed him to the position in December 1775. Hopkins is known for carrying out the successful raid of Nassau in the Bahamas, which captured large amounts of military supplies. His legacy today has become controversial due to Hopkins' involvement in the Atlantic slave trade.

== Early life and career ==
Hopkins was born in Scituate, Rhode Island into one of the most prominent families of colonial Rhode Island. At age 20 he went to sea and rapidly came to the fore as a good sailor and skillful trader. Before the American Revolutionary War he had sailed to nearly every quarter of the Earth and had commanded a privateer in the French and Indian War. In the interval between voyages, he was engaged in Rhode Island politics, served as a deputy to the Rhode Island General Assembly and rendered efficient support to his brother Stephen, who became governor in 1755.

In September 1764, Hopkins took command of the slave ship Sally, which was owned by Nicholas Brown Sr. Hopkins had no prior experience in operating a slave ship, and the 15-month voyage resulted in the deaths of 109 out of 196 slaves embarked at West Africa. In late 1765, Sally arrived at its first trading destination in the West Indies, but the surviving African captives were in such poor health that most sold for very little. Hopkins' disastrous command of Sally contributed to Moses Brown's turn against participation in the Atlantic slave trade.

== Revolutionary War service ==
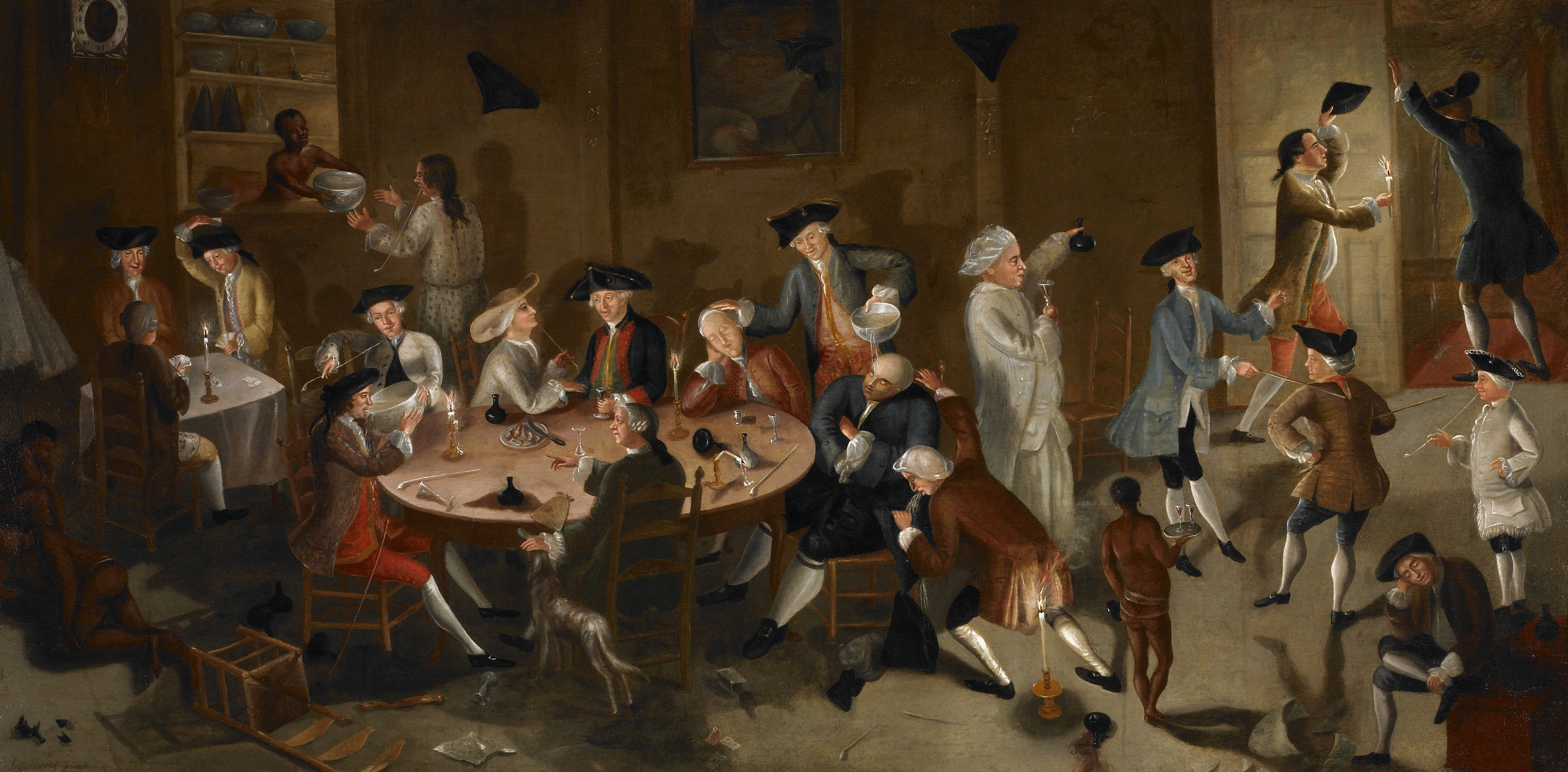
Hopkins (wearing dark blue and red coat) speaking to Nicholas Cooke in Sea Captains Carousing in Surinam (1755–1758)

Hopkins was appointed as brigadier general in the Rhode Island militia and commander of all military forces in the state on October 4, 1775. He began to strengthen Rhode Island's defenses with the help of his deputy, William West. On December 22 Hopkins was appointed commander-in-chief of the Continental Navy at the rank of the commodore; the navy had been established by the Continental Congress to protect American commerce. On January 5, 1776, Congress gave Hopkins his orders:

"You are instructed with the utmost diligence to proceed with the said fleet to sea and if the winds and weather will possibly admit of it to proceed directly for Chesapeake Bay in Virginia and when nearly arrived there you will send forward a small swift sailing vessel to gain intelligence....If...you find that they are not greatly superior to your own you are immediately to enter the said bay, search out and attack, take or destroy all the naval force of our enemies that you may find there. If you should be so fortunate as to execute this business successfully in Virginia you are then to proceed immediately to the southward and make yourself master of such forces as the enemy may have both in North and South Carolina...Notwithstanding these particular orders, which it is hoped you will be able to execute, if bad winds, or stormy weather, or any other unforeseen accident or disaster disenable you so to do, you are then to follow such courses as your best Judgment shall suggest to you as most useful to the American cause and to distress the Enemy by all means in your power."

Hopkins took command of eight merchantmen that had been converted into warships at Philadelphia. After much deliberation about taking on the overwhelming British forces listed in his orders, Hopkins utilized the last portion of his orders. He sailed south on February 17 for the first U.S. fleet operation that took the fleet to Providence in the Bahamas. He felt that it would be much more advantageous to seize a prize for the Continental Army than take a chance of destroying the Continental Navy in its infancy. He knew that the British port in Nassau would be poorly guarded and had Patriot sympathizers there who would help his cause.

The raid of Nassau carried out on March 3, was the first U.S. amphibious landing. Marines and sailors landed in "a bold stroke, worthy of an older and better trained service," capturing munitions desperately needed in the War of Independence. The little fleet returned to New London on April 8, having made prizes of two British merchantmen and a six-gun schooner, while failing to capture but severely damaging HMS Glasgow on April 6.

John Hancock, President of the Continental Congress, wrote Hopkins: "I beg leave to congratulate you on the success of your Expedition. Your account of the spirit and bravery shown by the men affords them [Congress] the greatest satisfaction..." Not only did Hopkins' expedition get needed war supplies for the Continental Army, but it showed the British Navy that they would have to divert their ships from the belligerent colonies to protect non-belligerent areas, thereby leaving fewer British ships to fight on the war front. John Paul Jones was a lieutenant at this time under Hopkins.

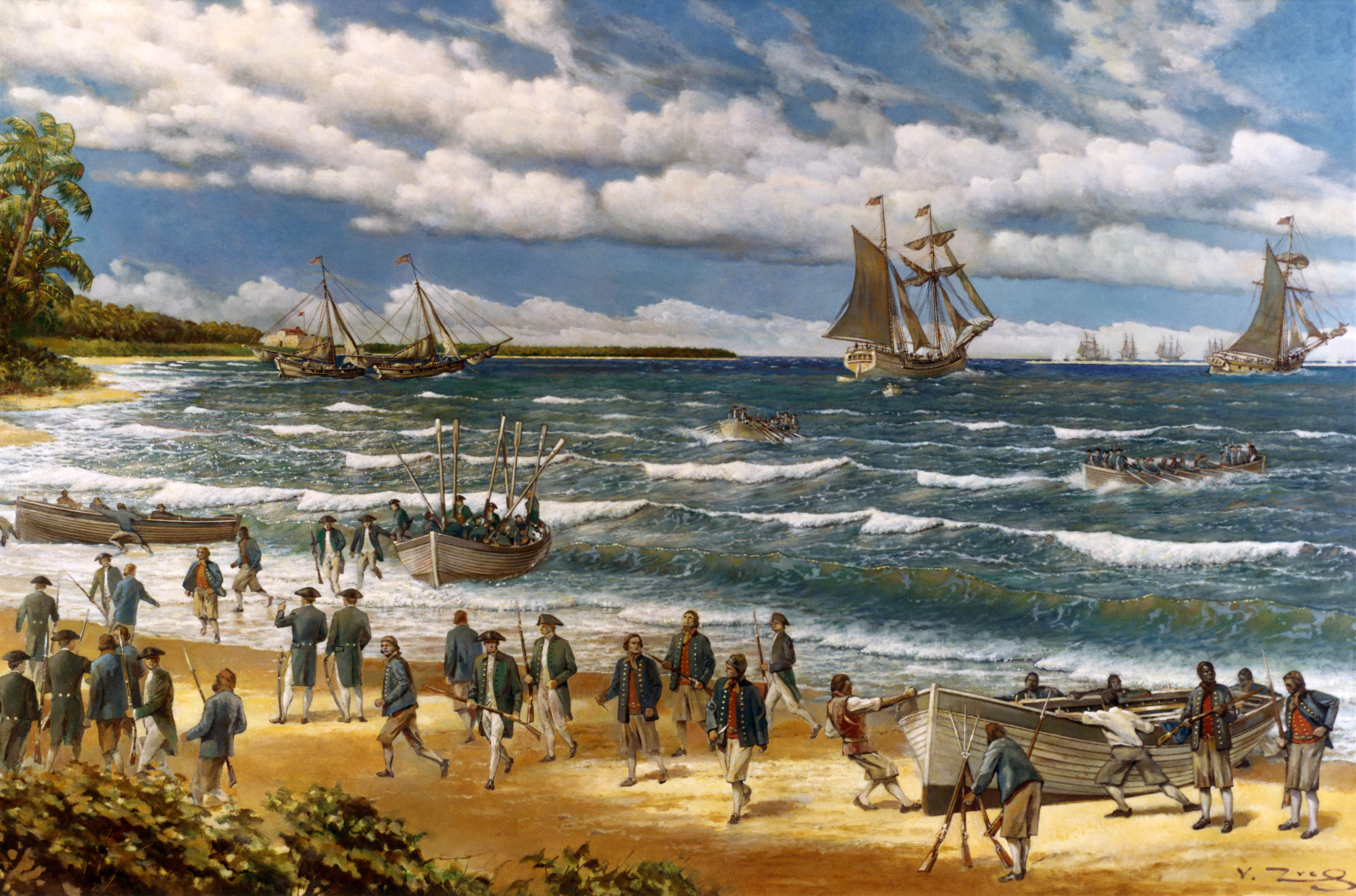
The raid of Nassau, which Hopkins led

Hopkins' decision to go to Nassau rather than pursue his orders concerning Chesapeake Bay upset southern members of the Continental Congress, which added to the political, social, economic, religious, and philosophical differences already occurring between members of the Congress. What happened next in the ensuing months was politically complex and controversial. The Continental Congress and individual state governors through their legislatures allowed privately owned ships to help in the battle against Britain by issuing letters of marque. There were virtually thousands of these ships, which overtook British ships, contributing to the war effort at sea. These privateer ships were allowed to claim any items found on the British ships they conquered as their own. They therefore were able to pay their seamen and officers nearly twice the amount that the Continental Navy could pay their crews, since the items captured by Continental ships went for the good of the colonies. Even after the Congress built and outfitted several more ships for Hopkins to use, he could not find adequate personnel to man the ships. John Adams, Samuel Adams, Benjamin Franklin, Richard Henry Lee, Robert Treat Paine, and John Paul Jones came to the defense of Hopkins.

Nevertheless, on August 12, 1776, Congress censured Hopkins. Humiliation and an injured reputation followed. Many sources say it would have been better if Hopkins was relieved of his command after the censure, rather than resume his command with a disgraced reputation and a loss of respect from his officers. Yet shortly after this Hancock wrote a resolution to have a schooner remade into a war ship and named the Hopkins, although there are no records that indicate his resolution was fulfilled.

Hopkins' little fleet was mostly blockaded in Narragansett Bay by the superior British sea power for the rest of Hopkins' tenure as commander-in-chief of the Continental Navy, partly because he had inadequate manpower to confront the enemy. A group of Hopkins' officers finally went directly to the Congress while at the same time leaving their ships without permission. Later it was determined that the allegations the officers took to Congress could not be substantiated—not in time, however, to squelch what was to happen. Pressure on the nature of Hopkins' character and ability became increasingly significant. Even though Hancock had congratulated Hopkins at the time, Hopkins' decision to go to Nassau in the Bahamas and the escape of Glasgow was used by politically charged legislators against him.

Even with the impassioned defense of John Adams, the Continental Congress voted on 2 January 1778 to relieve Hopkins of his command permanently. The first action of Hopkins in Nassau, which proved later to be an effective method for the Continental Navy to use against an overwhelming British Navy, was politically used against him. Substantiating this, John Paul Jones, who had been a lieutenant directly under Hopkins, gained great respect while continuing this same type of naval warfare against the much larger Royal Navy. "Furthermore, and perhaps most importantly, the Raid on Nassau brought the war to the English in an area where they felt more strategically threatened than the American Colonies. The West Indies was a location of importance to the British both due to trade concerns and due to its pivotal role in naval conflicts with the English nemesis France. Paranoia over losing the West Indies would frequently deflect English interests and military assets away from the war in America. English preoccupation with this area would nearly cause her to abandon the war in 1778 and may well have cost her the war in the long run. If true, it might well be said that this raid was the first tweaking of this English concern and a tweaking which may have set the tone for those later English decisions. As such, the Raid of Nassau was not just a minor tactical victory but a great strategic victory as well."

Hopkins's commission was for a variety of reasons, perhaps including for his part in the arrest of Richard Marven and Samuel Shaw, a pair of early whistle-blowers who reported his mistreatment of British prisoners of war. Hopkins's subsequent institution of criminal libel proceedings against Marven and Shaw is single-handedly responsible for the resolution of Congress "That it is the duty of all persons in the service of the United States, as well as all other inhabitants thereof to give the earliest information to Congress or any other proper authority of any misconduct, frauds or other misdemeanours committed by any persons in the service of these states, which may come to their knowledge."

== Post-Revolution ==
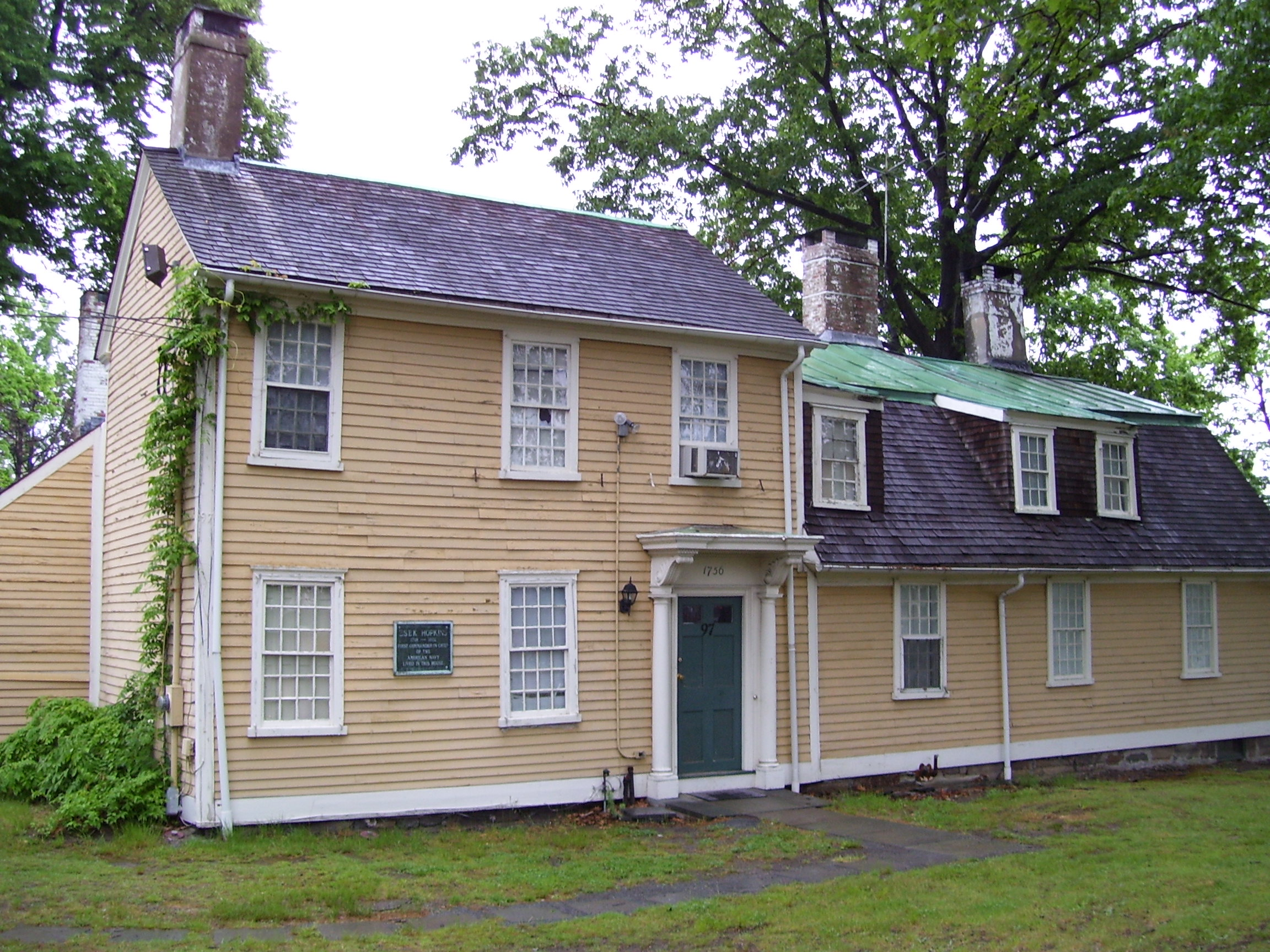
Esek Hopkins House, Providence, Rhode Island, built c. 1754

In spite of his Congressional dismissal, Hopkins was highly respected in Rhode Island and continued to serve the Rhode Island General Assembly through 1786, then retired to his farm where he died February 26, 1802. His home, the Esek Hopkins House, is listed on the National Register of Historic Places.

== Legacy ==
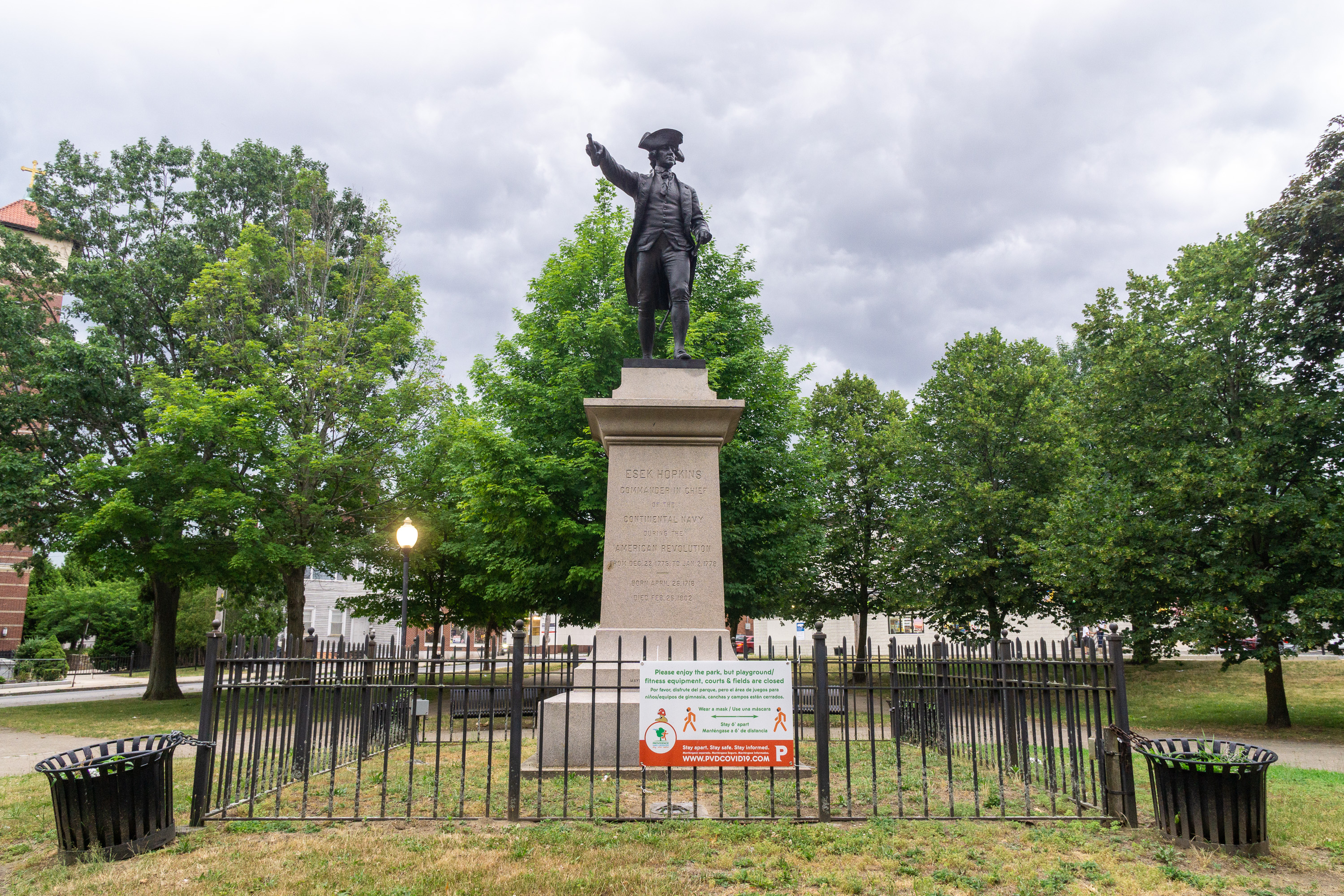
Statue of Hopkins by Theo Alice Ruggles Kitson in Hopkins Square, Providence

Hopkins adopted and helped to popularize the "Gadsden flag" that depicts a timber rattlesnake with 13 rattles representing the Thirteen Colonies with the phrase "Don't Tread on Me" on a yellow background. He adopted the banner as his personal flag and flew it from the mainmast of his flagship USS Alfred while he was aboard.

Three United States Navy vessels have been named USS Hopkins in his honor: two destroyers and a patrol boat. A statue of Hopkins by Theo Alice Ruggles Kitson was dedicated in 1891 on the site of the former Hopkins family cemetery at Charles and Branch Street.

In 2020 the Providence School Board voted to remove Hopkins' name from Esek Hopkins Middle School, citing Hopkins' association with the slave ship Sally.

== Personal life ==
Hopkins married Desire Burroughs (1724–1794) in November 1741. She belonged to a prosperous family of Newport, thus increasing his influence in Rhode Island. The marriage produced 9 children, including John Burroughs Hopkins (1742–1796), a participant in the Gaspee Affair, who later became a captain in the Continental Navy; and Susannah Hopkins (1756–1850), who married Jonathan Maxcy, a Baptist minister and second president of the formerly Baptist-affiliated Brown University, which was then known as the College of Rhode Island and Providence Plantations.

Hopkins was the brother of Rhode Island Governor Stephen Hopkins, a signer of the Declaration of Independence and first Brown University chancellor in conjunction with the tenure of president James Manning. Hopkins was buried in the North Burial Ground of Providence, Rhode Island.
