= Malaysia Federal Route 64 =

Road in Malaysia

Federal Route 64
- Benta–Jengka–Maran Highway; Jalan Benta–Jengka–Maran 文打–增卡–马兰路

Route information
- Maintained by Malaysian Public Works Department
- Length: 141.498 km (87.923 mi)
- Existed: 1887–present
- History: Completed in 1919

Major junctions
- Northwest end: Benta
- FT 8 Federal Route 8 FT 234 Federal Route 234; FT 98 Federal Route 98; FT 83 Federal Route 83; FT 62 Federal Route 62; FT 1531 Federal Route 1531; FT 1537 Federal Route 1537; FT 2 Federal Route 2
- Southeast end: Maran

Location
- Country: Malaysia
- Primary destinations: Raub, Kuala Lipis, Jerantut, Temerloh, Bandar Pusat Jengka

Highway system
- Highways in Malaysia; Expressways; Federal; State

Federal Route 64 or Benta–Jengka–Maran Highway is the main federal roads in Pahang, Malaysia. The road connects Benta in the west to Maran in the east.

== Route background ==
The Kilometre Zero of the Federal Route 64 starts at Benta.

== History ==
=== Upgrading of Federal Route 64 ===
The Federal Route 64 has received upgrading to improve connectivity between Lipis, Jerantut and Maran, increasing the safety and reduce congestion.

The Federal Route 64 upgrading project is ongoing in three (3) phase was planned and implementation by Public Work Department as Implementing Agency. Phase 1 from Benta to Jerantut and Phase 3 from Simpang Jengka to Simpang Maran now in implementation, meanwhile Phase 2 involving 21 km (13 mi) stretch from Jerantut to Simpang Jengka is fully completed.

=== Phase 1: Benta–Jerantut ===
The Upgrading Project Phase 1 is start from 27 December 2017 and completed on 25 May 2023.

The scopes of the upgrading are including:

1. Upgrading existing two lane single carriageway 6.7 km including preparation of paved shoulder with width 2.0 m according to JKR R5 standard
2. Migration of utility
3. Upgrading 7 Intersections
4. Land acquisition
5. Traffic light, street light and pedestrians traffic light installation

== Features ==
At most sections, the Federal Route 64 was built under the JKR R5 road standard, allowing maximum speed limit of up to 90 km/h.

== Junction lists ==
The entire route is located in Pahang.

Legend:

- I/C - Interchange, I/S - Intersection, RSA - Rest and service area, OBR - Overhead bridge restaurant, R/R - Restaurant and rest plaza, L/B - Layby, V/P - Vista point, TN - tunnel, T/P - Toll plaza, BR - Bridge
- C - Cloverleaf, S - Stack, T-A - Trumpet-A, T-B - Trumpet-B, DT - Directional-T/Y, SDT - Semi-Directional-T/Y, P-Y - Partial-Y, D - Diamond, P-C - Partial cloverleaf, D-D - Diverging diamond, D-R - Direct ramp

District	Location	km	mi	Name	Destinations	Notes
Lipis	Benta	0.0	0.0	Benta	FT 8 Malaysia Federal Route 8 – Kuala Lipis, Gua Musang, Kota Bharu, Raub, Bentong, Kuala Lumpur, Kuala Kubu Bharu, Bukit Fraser, Cameron Highlands	Roundabout
Lipis	Benta			Kampung Lubuk Gayung		
Lipis	Benta			Kampung Budu	C159 Jalan Budu-Tualang Padang – Kampung Batu Macing, Kampung Cat, Kampung Peruang	T-junctions
Lipis	Benta			SMK Panglima Garang Abdul Samad		
Lipis	Benta			Kampung Seniam		
Lipis	Benta			Kampung Kemahang		
Lipis	Benta			Tanjung Besar		
Lipis	Benta			Kampung Olak Batang		
Lipis	Benta			Kampung Pucuk		
Lipis	Benta			Kampung Jeransang		
Lipis	Benta			Kampung Lecir	C160 Jalan Kampung Relai – Kampung Relai, Kampung Putu, Kampung Atong	T-junctions
Lipis	Benta			Kampung Sempadan		
Jerantut	Damak			Batu Balai		
Jerantut	Damak			Kampung Jaya Pura		
Jerantut	Damak			Damak	C141 Pahang State Route C141 – Kuala Krau, Ulu Cheka, Perlok	T-junctions
Jerantut	Damak			Kampung Som		
Jerantut	Jerantut			Kampung Baharu		
Jerantut	Jerantut			Kampung Latar Kasah		
Jerantut	Jerantut			Kampung Binjai		
Jerantut	Jerantut			Kampung Sungai Par	C147 Jalan Jeransang – Jeransang, Temerloh	T-junctions
Jerantut	Jerantut			Railway crossing line		
Jerantut	Jerantut			Jerantut	FT 234 Malaysia Federal Route 234 – Kuala Lipis, Kuala Tembeling, Taman Negara, Temerloh, Mentakab East Coast Expressway / AH141 – Kuala Lumpur, Kuantan, Kuala Terengganu	Junctions
Jerantut	Jerantut			Kampung Jerantut Peri		
Jerantut	Jerantut			Pahang River bridge		
Jerantut	Jerantut			Kuala Tahan		
Jerantut	Jerantut			Pulau Tawar	C143 Pahang State Route C143 – Pulau Tawar, Durian Hijau	T-junctions
Jerantut	Jerantut			Kampung Batu Rong		
Jerantut	Jerantut			Jalan Bandar Pusat Jengka	FT 83 Malaysia Federal Route 83 – Bandar Pusat Jengka, Chenor, Kampung Awah East Coast Expressway / AH141 – Kuala Lumpur, Kuantan, Kuala Terengganu	T-junctions
Jerantut	Jerantut			Sungai Siam		
Jerantut	Jerantut			Sungai Tekam bridge		
Jerantut	Jerantut			FELDA Sungai Tekam	Jalan Sungai Tekam – FELDA Sungai Tekam, FELDA Mawar Jengka 10, Tekam Plantation Resort	Junctions
Jerantut	Jerantut			Kampung Sungai Kepong		
Jerantut	Jerantut			Jalan Jengka 1	FT 1542 Jalan Jengka 1 – FELDA Anggerik Jengka 1	T-junctions
Jerantut	Jerantut			Kampung Perak		
Jerantut	Jerantut			Jalan Jengka 1	FT 1542 Jalan Jengka 1 – FELDA Anggerik Jengka 1	T-junctions
Jerantut	Jerantut			Kampung Air Terjun		
Maran	Maran			Sungai Jerik		
Maran	Maran			Jalan Ulu Jempol	FT 1531 Malaysia Federal Route 1531 – FELDA Ulu Jempol	T-junctions
Maran	Maran			Jalan Utama Jengka Barat-Timur	FT 1537 Malaysia Federal Route 1537 – Bandar Pusat Jengka	T-junctions
Maran	Maran			Sungai Jempul bridge		
Maran	Maran			Kampung Jara		
Maran	Maran			Kampung Perenjak		
Maran	Maran			Sungai Weh bridge		
Maran	Maran			Kuala Sentul	Jalan Rantas–Kuala Sentul – Bandar Pusat Jengka	T-junctions
Maran	Maran	141.498	87.923	Maran	FT 2 Malaysia Federal Route 2 – Kuala Lumpur, Temerloh, Chenor, Lubuk Paku, Gambang, Kuantan, Segamat East Coast Expressway / AH141 – Kuala Lumpur, Kuantan, Kuala Terengganu	T-junctions
1.000 mi = 1.609 km; 1.000 km = 0.621 mi
