= Malaysia Federal Route 98 =

Road in Malaysia

Federal Route 98
- Jalan Temerloh–Jerantut

Route information
- Maintained by Malaysian Public Works Department
- Length: 56.21 km (34.93 mi)

Major junctions
- North end: Jerantut
- FT 234 Federal Route 234; FT 64 Federal Route 64; FT 1553 Jalan Jengka Utara-Barat East Coast Expressway / AH141; FT 87 Federal Route 87
- South end: Semantan, Temerloh

Location
- Country: Malaysia
- Primary destinations: Mentakab, Kerdau, Kuala Kerau, Taman Negara

Highway system
- Highways in Malaysia; Expressways; Federal; State

Federal Route 98, or Jalan Temerloh–Jerantut, is a main federal road in Pahang, Malaysia. The roads connects Jerantut in the north to Temerloh in the south. It is also a main route to East Coast Expressway via Temerloh Interchange and also Taman Negara.

The route starts at Temerloh, at its interchange with the Federal Route 87.

== Features ==
The Federal Route 98 was built under the JKR R5 road standard, allowing a maximum speed limit of up to 90 km/h.

== Junction lists ==
The entire route is located in Pahang.

Legend:

- I/C - Interchange, I/S - Intersection, RSA - Rest and service area, OBR - Overhead bridge restaurant, R/R - Restaurant and rest plaza, L/B - Layby, V/P - Vista point, TN - tunnel, T/P - Toll plaza, BR - Bridge
- C - Cloverleaf, S - Stack, T-A - Trumpet-A, T-B - Trumpet-B, DT - Directional-T/Y, SDT - Semi-Directional-T/Y, P-Y - Partial-Y, D - Diamond, P-C - Partial cloverleaf, D-D - Diverging diamond, D-R - Direct ramp

| District | Location | km | mi | Name | Destinations | Notes |
|---|---|---|---|---|---|---|
| Jerantut | Jerantut | 56.21 | 34.93 | Jerantut | FT 234 Malaysia Federal Route 234 – Kuala Lipis, Kuala Tembeling, Taman Negara; FT 64 Malaysia Federal Route 64 – Benta, Raub, Kuala Lipis, Bandar Pusat Jengka, Maran | Junctions |
| Jerantut | Jerantut | | | Kampung Padang Saujana | | |
| Jerantut | Jerantut | | | Kampung Temin | | |
| Jerantut | Jerantut | | | Kampung Bukit Genting | | |
| Jerantut | Jerantut | | | Simpang Tebing Tinggi | C147 Jalan Jeransang – Jeransang, Benta; C145 Jalan Tanjung Rengas – Kampung Tanah Niyor, Kampung Tanjung Rengas | Junctions |
| Jerantut | Jerantut | | | Kampung Batu Lenggang | | |
| Jerantut | Jerantut | | | Kampung Batu Gapih | | |
| Jerantut | Jerantut | | | Kampung Bukit Dinding | | |
| Jerantut | Jerantut | | | Jalan Bukit Ketupat | C132 Jalan Bukit Ketupat – Kampung Bukit Ketupat | T-junctions |
| Temerloh | Kuala Krau | | | Kampung Gong Halt | | |
| Temerloh | Kuala Krau | | | Kampung Kuala Mai | | |
| Temerloh | Kuala Krau | | | Kampung Seboi | | |
| Temerloh | Kuala Krau | | | Kampung Jebat | | |
| Temerloh | Kuala Krau | | | Kampung Tanjung Timbau | FT 1553 Jalan Jengka Utara-Barat – Durian Hijau, Bandar Pusat Jengka | T-junctions |
| Temerloh | Kuala Krau | | | Kampung Masjid | | |
| Temerloh | Kuala Krau | | | Kampung Batu Gadin | | |
| Temerloh | Kuala Krau | | | Sungai Krau bridge | | |
| Temerloh | Kuala Krau | | | Kuala Krau | Kuala Krau railway station | |
| Temerloh | Kuala Krau | | | Jalan Ulu Cheka | C141 Pahang State Route C141 – Damak, Ulu Cheka, Perlok | T-junctions |
| Temerloh | Kuala Krau | | | Kuala Krau | | |
| Temerloh | Kuala Krau | | | Taman Setia | | |
| Temerloh | Kuala Krau | | | Kampung Tanjung Kubu | | |
| Temerloh | Kuala Krau | | | Kampung Paya Parit | C139 Jalan Kampung Bengik – Kampung Bengik | T-junctions |
| Temerloh | Kuala Krau | | | Sungai Tekal | | |
| Temerloh | Kuala Krau | | | Kampung Dato Sharif Ahmad | | |
| Temerloh | Kuala Krau | | | Kampung Gajah Mati | C139 Jalan Kampung Jenderak Loop – Kampung Bengik | T-junctions |
| Temerloh | Kuala Krau | | | Kampung Cengkenik | | |
| Temerloh | Kuala Krau | | | Kampung Guntong | | |
| Temerloh | Kuala Krau | | | Kampung Batu Lada | | |
| Temerloh | Kuala Krau | | | Kampung Kelibang | | |
| Temerloh | Kuala Krau | | | Kampung Rasau | | |
| Temerloh | Kuala Krau | | | Kampung Guntung | | |
| Temerloh | Kuala Krau | | | Kerdau | C137 Jalan Kerdau – Kerdau | T-junctions |
| Temerloh | Kuala Krau | | | Kampung Tanjung Perah | C137 Jalan Kerdau – Kerdau | T-junctions |
| Temerloh | Kuala Krau | | | Kampung Seri Ketumbit | | |
| Temerloh | Kuala Krau | | | Kampung Paya Rambai | | |
| Temerloh | Kuala Krau | | | Kampung Ketapi | | |
| Temerloh | Kuala Krau | | | Kampung Panah Limau | | |
| Temerloh | Kuala Krau | | | Kampung Batu Tutur | | |
| Temerloh | Temerloh | | | Kampung Ketam | | |
| Temerloh | Temerloh | | | Kampung Desa Murni | | |
| Temerloh | Temerloh | | | Kampung Songsang | C121 Jalan Sanggang – Sanggang, Tebing Tinggi, Paya Banir | Junctions |
| Temerloh | Temerloh | | | Kampung Paya Keladan | | |
| Temerloh | Temerloh | | | Temerloh-ECE | East Coast Expressway / AH141 – Kuala Lumpur, Karak, Lanchang, Chenor, Kuantan, Kuala Terengganu | T-junctions |
| Temerloh | Temerloh | | | Kampung Batu Bukit | | |
| Temerloh | Temerloh | | | Kampung Batu Tingkat | | |
| Temerloh | Temerloh | | | Kampung Batu Pintal | | |
| Temerloh | Temerloh | | | Jalan Bukit Tingkat | C119 Jalan Bukit Tingkat – Kampung Bukit Tingkat, Kampung Lubuk Kawah | T-junctions |
| Temerloh | Temerloh | | | Kampung Raja | | |
| Temerloh | Temerloh | | | Kampung Paya Tambang | | |
| Temerloh | Temerloh | | | Sungai Semantan bridge | | |
| Temerloh | Temerloh | | | Kampung Padang Kerbau | | |
| Temerloh | Temerloh | 0.0 | 0.0 | Temerloh; Semantan | FT 87 Malaysia Federal Route 87 – Mentakab, Karak, Lanchang, Kuala Lumpur, Temerloh, Maran, Kuantan, Teriang, Bahau; Jalan Sri Kemuning – Kampung Batu Tiga | Junctions |
1.000 mi = 1.609 km; 1.000 km = 0.621 mi
