= Pahang State Route C143 =

Road in Malaysia

Pahang Route 143
- Jalan Pulau Tawar-Durian Hijau

Major junctions
- South end: Durian Hijau
- FT 1553 Jalan Jengka Utara-Barat; FT 64 Federal Route 64
- Southeast end: Pulau Tawar

Location
- Country: Malaysia
- Primary destinations: Kampung Perian; Kampung Bandar; Kampung Kepala Pulau; Kampung Bukit Nikmat

Highway system
- Highways in Malaysia; Expressways; Federal; State

Jalan Pulau Tawar-Durian Hijau (Pahang state route C143) is a major road in Pahang, Malaysia.

== List of junctions ==
Km	Exit	Junctions	To	Remarks
		Durian Hijau	FT 1553 Jalan Jengka Utara-Barat West; FT 1553 Kuala Krau; FT 98 Jerantut; FT 98 Temerloh; East Coast Expressway AH141 East Coast Expressway; Kuala Lumpur East; FT 1553 Bandar Pusat Jengka; FT 1553 FELDA Jengka; East Coast Expressway AH141 East Coast Expressway; Kuantan; Kuala Terengganu	T-junction
		Durian Hijau		
		FELDA Jengka 24	East; Jalan FELDA Jengka 24; FELDA Jengka 24	T-junction
		Kampung Kepala Pulau		
		Kampung Bukit Nikmat		
		Sungai Tekam bridge		
		Sekolah Menengah Kebangsaan Pulau Tekam		
		Pulau Tawar Muslim Cemetery	Pulau Tawar Muslim Cemetery; Makam Pahlawan Mat Kilau (The Tomb of Mat Kilau)	Historical site
		Kampung Bandar		
		Sekolah Kebangsaan Perian		
		Kampung Perian		
		Sekolah Menengah Agama Pulau Tawar		
		Pulau Tawar; Jalan Paya Tampak	North; Jalan Paya Tampak; Paya Tampak; FT 64 Jerantut	T-junction
		Pulau Tawar		
		Kampung Batu Rong		
		Pulau Tawar	Northwest; FT 64 Jerantut; FT 64 Benta; FT 234 Kuala Tembeling; FT 234 Taman Negara Southeast; FT 64 Maran; FT 83 Bandar Pusat Jengka	T-junction
