= Pahang State Route C141 =

Road in Malaysia

Pahang Route 141
- Jalan Ulu Cheka

Major junctions
- South end: Kuala Krau
- FT 98 Federal Route 98; FT 64 Federal Route 64
- Southeast end: Damak

Location
- Country: Malaysia
- Primary destinations: Ulu Cheka

Highway system
- Highways in Malaysia; Expressways; Federal; State

Jalan Ulu Cheka (Pahang state route C141) is a major road in Pahang, Malaysia. The roads served as a bypass of Jerantut town.

== List of junctions ==
Km	Exit	Junctions	To	Remarks
		Kuala Krau	North; FT 98 Jerantut; FT 234 Kuala Tembeling; FT 1553 Bandar Pusat Jengka; FT 234 Taman Negara FT 98 Temerloh; FT 98 Mentakab; East Coast Expressway AH141 East Coast Expressway; Kuala Lumpur; Kuantan; Kuala Terengganu	T-junction
		Kuala Krau		
		Kampung Paya Luas		
		Kampung Penderas		
		Kampung Pian		
		Sungai Krau bridge		
		Perlok		
		Ulu Cheka	Masjid Ulu Cheka; Makam Pawang Nong (The tomb of Pawang Nong]	
		Ulu Cheka	Southwest; Ulu Cheka; Sekolah Kebangsaan Pawang Nong	T-junction
		Kampung Koi		
		Kampung Bukit Batu		
		Damak	West; FT 64 Benta; FT 8 Raub; FT 98 Kuala Lipis EAST; FT 64 Jerantut; FT 234 Kuala Tembeling; FT 234 Taman Negara	T-junction
