= Jerantut (town) =

Town in Pahang, Malaysia

Coordinates: 3°56′N 102°22′E

Jerantut District Council Majlis Daerah Jerantut

Type
- Type: Local authority

History
- Founded: 1 March 1982
- Preceded by: Jerantut Town Board

Leadership
- President: Khairun Nissa Aris
- District secretary: Mohd Khasri Abdullah

Meeting place
- 27000 Jerantut, Pahang Darul Makmur

Website
- www.mdjerantut.gov.my

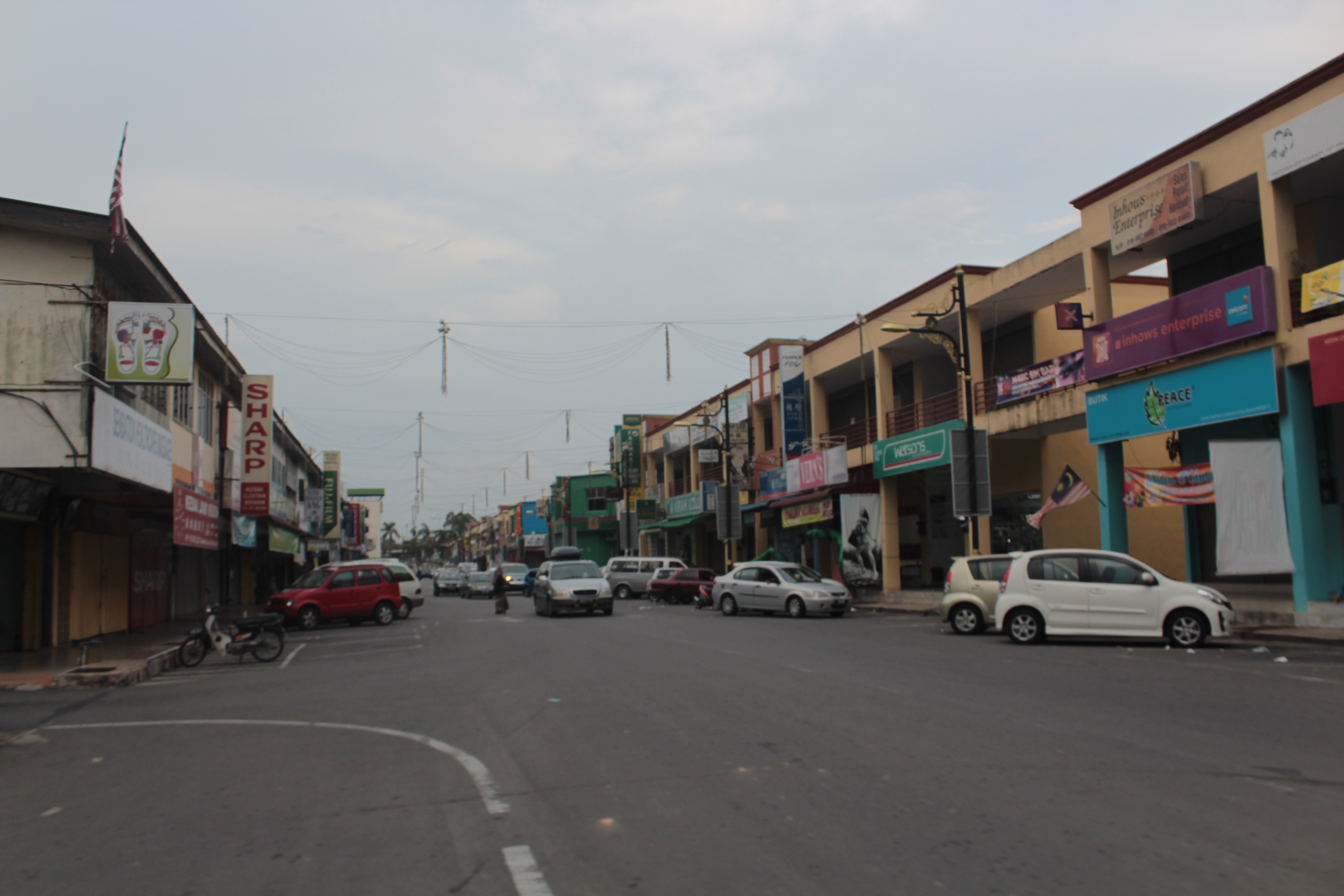
Jerantut town.

Jerantut is a town in Jerantut District, Pahang, Malaysia. It is the largest district in the State of Pahang. It covers an area of 2,900 square miles (755,771.93 Hectares). Bordered by the States of Kelantan and Terengganu in the North, Temerloh and Maran districts in the South, Lipis and Raub districts in the West and Kuantan district and Terengganu state in the East. It has 10 mukims consisting of 295 villages administered under 58 JKKK. Jerantut District Council was gazetted on 18 February 1982. Jerantut District Council (Malay: Majlis Daerah Jerantut), formerly known as Jerantut Town Board (Malay: Lembaga Bandaran Jerantut) is the local authority of Jerantut town.

== Tourism ==
Jerantut is the gateway to Taman Negara, the first national park in Malaysia. There is a natural park nearby that can be visited by visitors, namely Taman Rimba Kenong. The Kota Gelanggi Cave is located about 25 kilometers east of Jerantut. Most of these caves are archeological sites, but some caves have now been opened to the public. In addition to caves, other tourist attractions are the Lata Meraung Waterfall, Orang Asli settlements, Gunung Tahan, Gunung Benom, and the Rafflesia Research Center.

== Transport ==
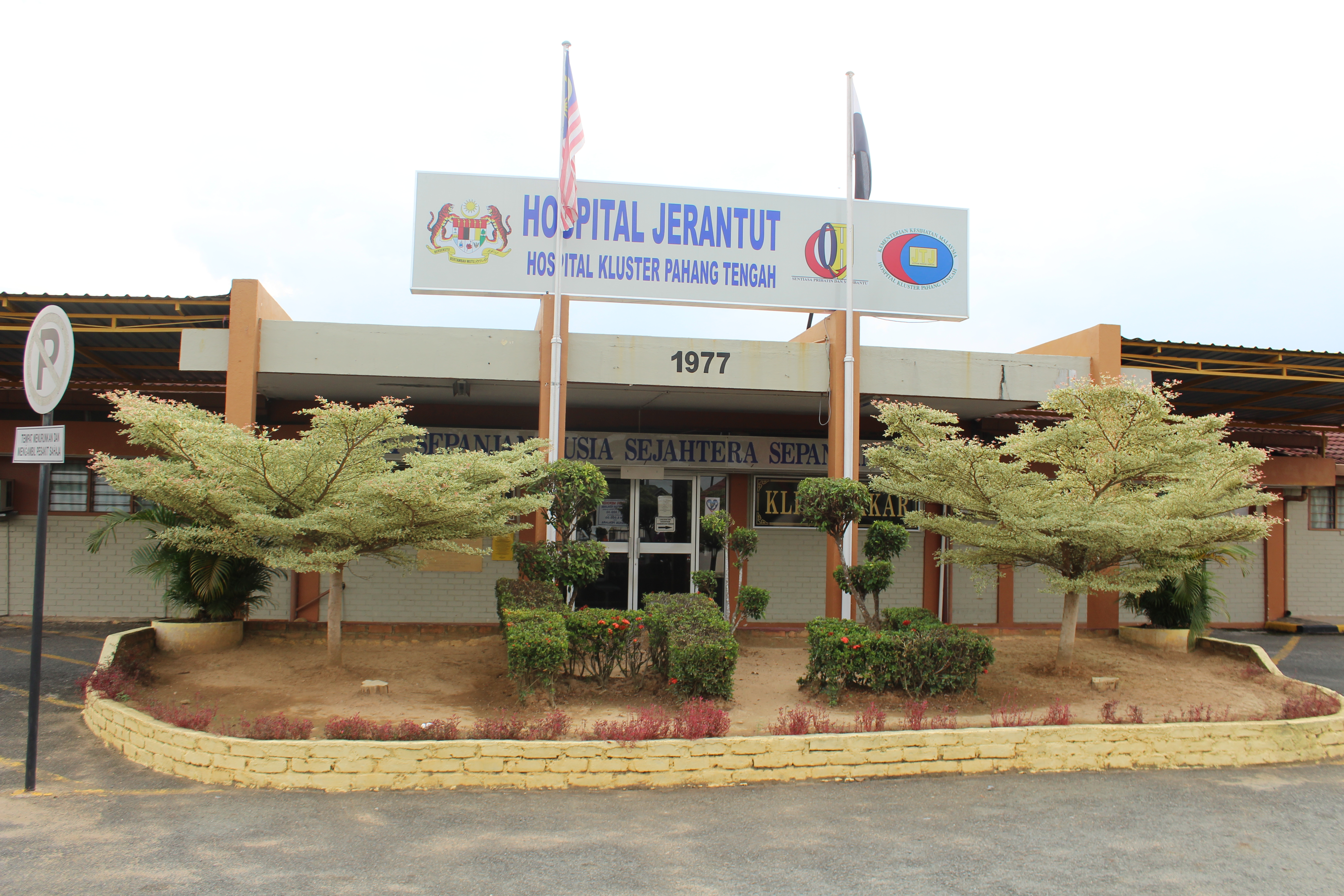
Jerantut hospital.

=== Car ===
Jerantut is well connected to other towns in Pahang. Federal Route 98 links Jerantut to Temerloh, the second-largest city of Pahang. Federal Route 64 joins Jerantut through Jengka and then Maran, where Route 64 interchanges with East Coast Expressway en route to Kuantan or Kuala Lumpur.

A smaller Federal Route 234 connects Jerantut to Kuala Lipis, the former capital of Pahang.

=== Rail ===
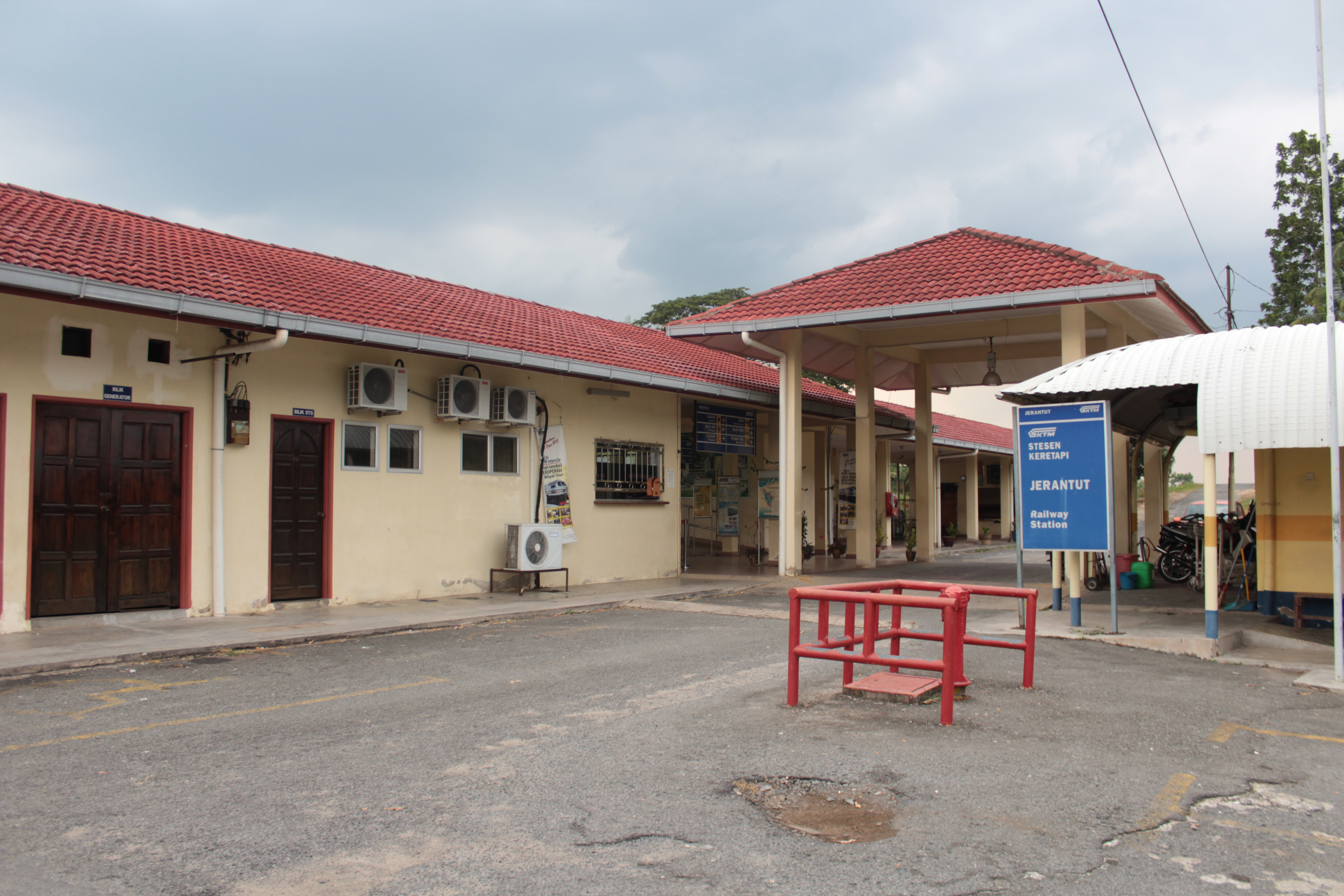
Jerantut railway station.

The Jerantut railway station operated by Keretapi Tanah Melayu (KTM) is one of the major stations of KTM's East Coast Line. KTM Intercity and Express trains stop at this station. Visitors to Taman Negara can disembark from here.

=== Bus ===
The Jerantut Bus Terminal, located at the heart of the town is one of the methods of transportation. Visitors can take bus to Jerantut from Kuala Lumpur's Titiwangsa Station, Temerloh Bus Terminal and some other major cities. From the bus terminal, there are bus services to Taman Negara.

=== Logging Truck and 4WD ===
Another transportation mode for people, while benefiting the loggers. and poachers Federal Route 1508 to Kuala Tahan and non gazetted roads to Ulu Tembeling near Pahang-Terengganu border are connected with Federal Route 1521, 1522, 1524 and 1525 to Lepar Utara by intra-timber roads for people and animal mobilisations between remote areas in this district and further south to Malaysia Federal Route 2 Federal Route 2 at Sri Jaya and State Road C135 in Maran District.
