= Jerantut District =

Jerantut District Jerantet (Pahang Malay)
- District of Pahang
- Daerah Jerantut
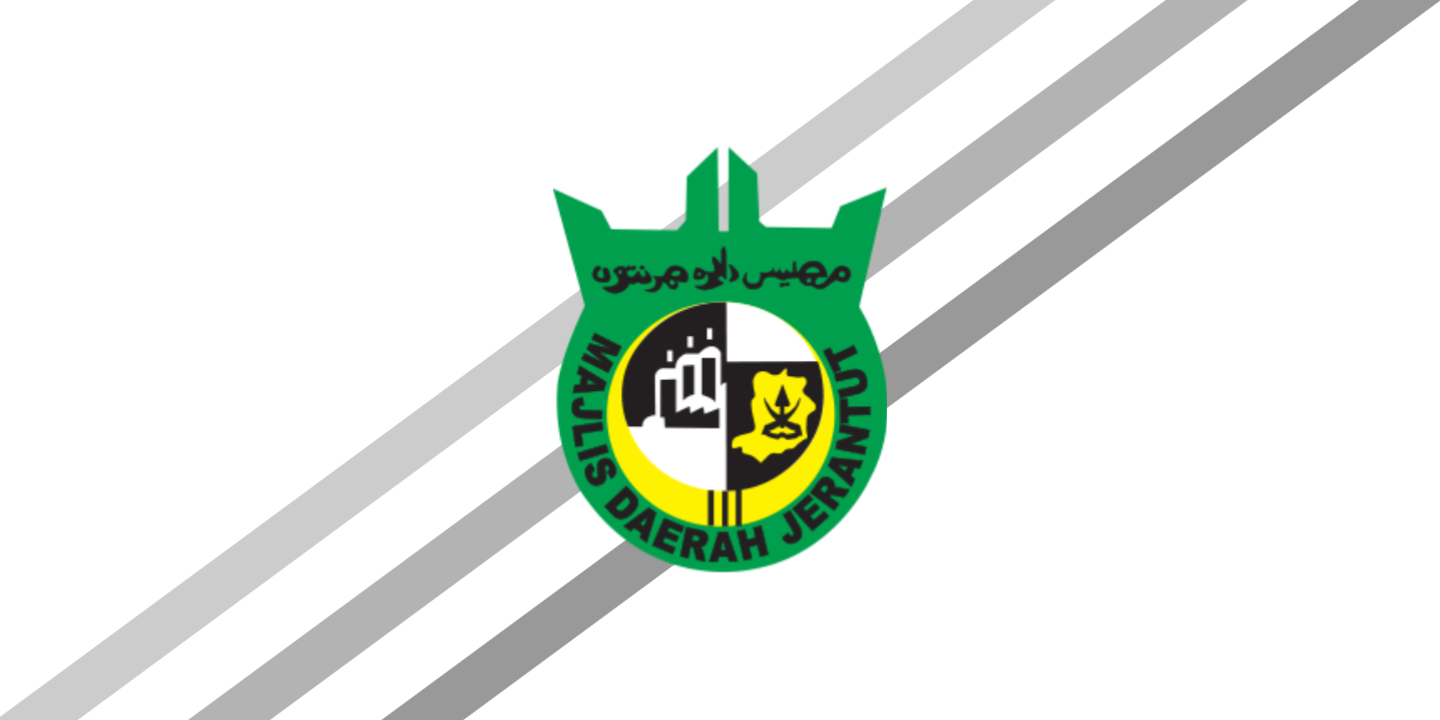
- Flag Seal

- Location of Jerantut District in Pahang
- Interactive map of Jerantut District
- Location of Jerantut District in Malaysia
- Coordinates: 3°56′N 102°22′E
- Country: Malaysia
- State: Pahang
- Seat: Jerantut
- Local area government(s): Jerantut District Council

Government
  - District officer: Nor Asmaliza Ku Lah

Area
  - Total: 7,207.6 km^{2} (2,782.9 sq mi)

Population (2010)
  - Total: 86,840
  - Density: 12.05/km^{2} (31.21/sq mi)
- Time zone: UTC+8 (MST)
  - Summer (DST): UTC+8 (Not observed)
- Postcode: 27xxx
- Calling code: +6-09
- Vehicle registration plates: C

The Jerantut District (Pahang Malay: Jerantet) is a district in north-eastern Pahang, Malaysia. Jerantut is home to the National Park.

Being the largest district in Pahang, it bounds the northern states of Kelantan and Terengganu, in the south, Temerloh District and Maran District, in the west, Lipis District and Raub District and in the east, Kuantan District. Tembeling River, the main river in this district is one way to the National Park and the surrounding villages in Ulu Tembeling, as well as national highway 1508 from Jerantut town.

The confluence of Tembeling and Jelai rivers form the Pahang River where it flows right through central Pahang before emptying into the South China Sea near the royal town Pekan.

== History ==
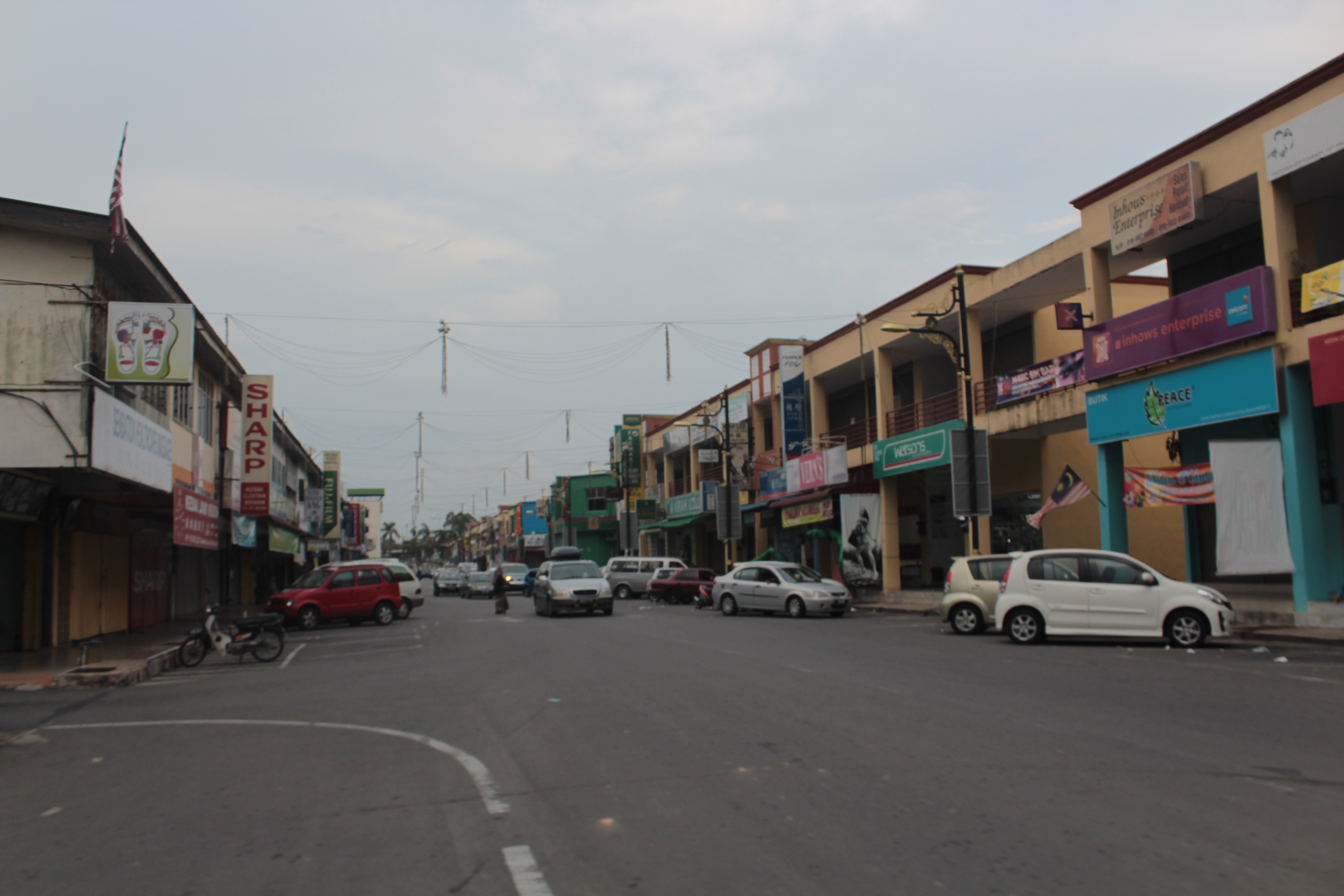
Jerantut town.

During colonial rule, Jerantut was part of Lipis District. In 1951 it was made an autonomous subdistrict (daerah kecil), with an Assistant Officer seconded from the Kuala Lipis district office. Jerantut was made a district in its own right in 1959, but it wasn't represented in parliament until 1974.

== Politics ==
Jerantut district representative in the Federal Parliament (Dewan Rakyat)

Parliament	Seat Name	Member of Parliament	Party
P81	Jerantut	Khairil Nizam Khirudin	Perikatan Nasional (PAS)

List of Jerantut district representatives in the State Legislative Assembly (Dewan Undangan Negeri)

Parliament	State	Seat Name	State Assemblyman	Party
P81	N9	Tahan	Mohd Zakhwan Ahmad Badarddin	Perikatan Nasional (PAS)
P81	N10	Damak	Ustaz Zuridan M. Daud	Perikatan Nasional (PAS)
P81	N11	Pulau Tawar	Yohanis Ahmad	Perikatan Nasional (PAS)

== Administrative divisions ==
Map of Jerantut district.

Jerantut District is divided into 10 mukims, which are:

- Burau (12,120 Ha)
- Hulu Cheka (29,000 Ha)
- Hulu Tembeling (416,897 Ha)
- Kelola (6,248 Ha)
- Kuala Tembeling (10,778 Ha)
- Pedah (24,600 Ha) (Capital)
- Pulau Tawar (84,435 Ha)
- Tebing Tinggi (33,400 Ha)
- Teh (9,563 Ha)
- Tembeling (135,718 Ha)

== Demographics ==
Historical population
Year	Pop.	±%
1991	74,547	—
2000	80,685	+8.2%
2010	88,035	+9.1%
2020	96,006	+9.1%

The following is based on Department of Statistics Malaysia 2010 census.

Ethnic groups in Jerantut, 2010 census
Ethnicity	Population	Percentage
Bumiputera	73,648	84.8%
Chinese	10,056	11.6%
Indian	2,930	3.4%
Others	206	0.2%
Total	86,840	100%

== Attractions ==
Jerantut is a popular gateway to Taman Negara, the first national park in Malaysia and one of the world's oldest rainforest. As the most remote district in Malay Peninsula, the district solely depending on Taman Negara ecotourism to thrive on. Another side quests besides Taman Negara include:

- Kem Nusa Forest Eco Park - Lowland dipterocarp forest within Tekai/Tembeling Forest Reserve for camping and recreational retreat. Accessible from Jerantut by Federal Route 64 and Federal Route 1508 to Kuala Tahan.
- Ulu Tembeling Forest Eco Park - Hill dipterocarp forest in Tekai Forest Reserve for outdoor retreat. Accessible from Jerantut through Federal Route 64, Federal Route 1508 to Kuala Tahan and non gazetted roads beyond.
- Gunung Ais - 4WD and motocross offroad adventures to the mountains near Pahang-Terengganu border. Usually accessible from Jerantut through Federal Route 64, Federal Route 1521, 1522 & 1524 towards FELDA Gugusan Lepar Utara and offroad beyond.
- FELDA Residence Tekam - Sporting and family recreational resort surrounded by palm oil, rubber and fruit plantations. Located near Jengka territories border and accessible from Jerantut via Federal Route 64 towards Maran.
- Kota Gelanggi Caves Complex - Archeological limestone caves with some are open to public for caving, abseiling and outdoor adventures. Accessible from Jerantut via Federal Route 64 towards Bandar Tun Razak.
- Lost Waterfalls Ulu Salan - Multiple hidden rapids, streams and waterfalls for outdoor retreats and adventures. Accessible from Jerantut through Federal Route 64, Federal Road 1508 towards Kuala Tahan and offroad beyond.
- Tekai Lake - Future man-made lake from under construction Tekai Hydroelectric Dam reservoir.
- Kuala Tembeling Jetty - Alternative waterway along Tembeling River to Taman Negara at Kuala Tahan or further upstream to well-preserved traditional villages in Ulu Tembeling. Pahang River starting point accessible from Jerantut via Federal Route 234 towards Kuala Lipis.
- Paya Gunong Extreme Park - Limestone hills and caves for abseiling and rock climbing by via ferrata. Short distance from Jerantut, accessible by Federal Route 64 towards Jerantut Feri and small dirt road towards the location.
- Jungle Railway - British colonial back and forth Gemas-Tumpat East Coast railway train journey through the palm oil plantations, rubber plantations and forest-thicked central spine of Malay Peninsula. Passengers boarding from Jerantut KTMB Station.
- Bukit Seladang - Recreational hilltops for outdoor retreat at Jerantut.
- Lembah Kiol & Lata Meraung Forest Eco Park - Recreational parks, aborigine settlements, streams, rapids and waterfall in lowland dipterocarp forest within Jerantut Tambahan Forest Reserve. Accessible from Jerantut via Federal Route 64 and State Road C147.
- Lata Besin Waterfalls - Waterfalls in Jerantut Tambahan Forest Reserve at Kampung Bharu. Short distance from Jerantut, accessible via Federal Route 64 towards Benta. Mostly known only to locals.
- Som Forest Eco Park - Lowland dipterocarp forest in Som Forest Reserve for recreational and medicational study purposes. Short distance from Jerantut, accessible via Federal Route 64 towards Benta.
- Gunung Benom - East side (west side via Raub) jungle trekking and outdoor adventures to the mountain. Starting point accessible from Jerantut via Federal Route 64 to Damak and State Road C141 towards Kuala Krau.
