= Malaysia Federal Route 62 =

Road in Malaysia

Federal Route 62
- Jalan Bandar Pusat Jengka Timur

Route information
- Maintained by Malaysian Public Works Department
- Length: 37.8 km (23.5 mi)

Major junctions
- North end: Bandar Pusat Jengka
- FT 83 Federal Route 83; FT 1531 Jalan Ulu Jempol; FT 1537 Jalan Utama Jengka Barat-Timur; FT 2 Federal Route 2
- South end: Seri Jengka

Location
- Country: Malaysia
- Primary destinations: FELDA settlements, FELDA Hulu Jempol, Maran

Highway system
- Highways in Malaysia; Expressways; Federal; State

Federal Route 62, or Jalan Bandar Pusat Jengka Timur, is the main federal road in Bandar Pusat Jengka, Pahang, Malaysia. There are many Federal Land Development Authority (FELDA) settlements along this road.

== Features ==
At most sections, the Federal Route 62 was built under the JKR R5 road standard, allowing maximum speed limit of up to 90 km/h.

== Junction lists ==
The entire route is located in Maran District, Pahang.

Legend:

- I/C - Interchange, I/S - Intersection, RSA - Rest and service area, OBR - Overhead bridge restaurant, R/R - Restaurant and rest plaza, L/B - Layby, V/P - Vista point, TN - tunnel, T/P - Toll plaza, BR - Bridge
- C - Cloverleaf, S - Stack, T-A - Trumpet-A, T-B - Trumpet-B, DT - Directional-T/Y, SDT - Semi-Directional-T/Y, P-Y - Partial-Y, D - Diamond, P-C - Partial cloverleaf, D-D - Diverging diamond, D-R - Direct ramp

Location	km	mi	Name	Destinations	Notes
Jengka Triangle			Bandar Pusat Jengka	FT 83 Malaysia Federal Route 83 – Jerantut, Benta, Kuala Lipis, Raub, Taman Negara, Chenor, Kampung Awah, Temerloh East Coast Expressway / AH141 – Kuala Lumpur, Kuantan, Kuala Terengganu	T-junctions
Jengka Triangle			Sungai Jengka bridge		
Jengka Triangle			Bandar Pusat Jengka	Lintasan Semarak – Universiti Teknologi MARA (UiTM) Bandar Pusat Jengka Campus	T-junctions
Jengka Triangle			Jalan Ulu Jempol	FT 1531 Jalan Ulu Jempol – FELDA Ulu Jempol	T-junctions
Jengka Triangle			Jengka East	FT 1537 Jalan Utama Jengka Barat-Timur – Maran	T-junctions
Jengka Triangle			FELDA Chempaka Jengka 2		
Jengka Triangle			FELDA Dahlia Jengka 3		
Jengka Triangle			Jalan FELDA Kenanga Jengka 7	Jalan FELDA Kenanga Jengka 7 – FELDA Kenanga Jengka 7, FELDA Keembung Jengka 6	T-junctions
Jengka Triangle			FELDA Jengka 4	FT 1543 Jalan Jengka 4 – FELDA Jengka 4	T-junctions
Jengka Triangle			Rizab Melayu Senyum Jempul		
Jengka Triangle			Sungai Jempul bridge		
Jengka Triangle			Jalan Rantas-Kuala Sentul	Jalan Rantas-Kuala Sentul – Kuala Sentul, Maran	T-junctions
Jengka Triangle			FELDA Jengka 5	FT 1544 Jalan Jengka 5 – FELDA Jengka 5	T-junctions
Jengka Triangle			Kampung Rela		
Jengka Triangle			Kampung Tentayan		
Jengka Triangle			Kampung Curuk		
Maran			Sungai Siam bridge Jengka Triangle-Maran sub-district border		
Maran			Seri Jengka Rest and Service Area		
Maran			Seri Jengka	FT 2 Malaysia Federal Route 2 – Mentakab, Temerloh, Maran, Gambang East Coast Expressway / AH141 – Kuala Lumpur, Bentong, Kuantan, Kuala Terengganu; Jalan Kuala Jempul – Kampung Kuala Jempul	Junctions
1.000 mi = 1.609 km; 1.000 km = 0.621 mi
