= Pangkalan =

Pangkalan may refer to the following places:

== Indonesia ==
- Pangkalan Brandan, North Sumatra
- Pangkalan Bun, Central Kalimantan
- Pangkalan Kerinci, Riau

== Malaysia ==
- Pangkalan Stungkor, Lundu Division, Sarawak
- Pangkalan Tebang, Kuching Division, Sarawak
