= Jalan Jengka 5 =

Road in Malaysia

Federal Route 1544
- Jalan Jengka 5

Route information
- Maintained by Malaysian Public Works Department

Major junctions
- West end: FT 62 Jalan Bandar Pusat Jengka Timur
- FT 62 Jalan Bandar Pusat Jengka Timur
- East end: FELDA Jengka 5

Location
- Country: Malaysia

Highway system
- Highways in Malaysia; Expressways; Federal; State

Jalan Jengka 5, Federal Route 1544, is a main federal road in Bandar Pusat Jengka, Pahang, Malaysia.

At most sections, the Federal Route 1544 was built under the JKR R5 road standard, with a speed limit of 90 km/h.

== List of junctions ==
km	Exit	Junctions	To	Remarks
		Jalan Bandar Pusat Jengka Timur	FT 62 Jalan Bandar Pusat Jengka Timur; North; Bandar Pusat Jengka; South; Temerloh; Maran; East Coast Expressway East Coast Expressway; Kuala Lumpur; Kuala Terengganu; Kuantan	T-junctions
		FELDA Jengka 5 Welcome arch		
		FELDA Jengka 5		
