= Malaysia Federal Route 234 =

Federal road in Pahang, Malaysia

Federal Route 234
- Jalan Jerantut-Kuala Lipis (Jalan Sungai Jan (Jerantut)) (Jalan Pekeliling (Kuala Lipis))

Route information
- Length: 61.66 km (38.31 mi)

Major junctions
- East end: Jerantut
- FT 98 Federal Route 98; FT 8 Federal Route 8
- West end: Kuala Lipis

Location
- Country: Malaysia
- Primary destinations: Kuala Tembeling; Taman Negara (National Park); Mela; Kerambit

Highway system
- Highways in Malaysia; Expressways; Federal; State

Federal Route 234, or Jalan Jerantut-Kuala Lipis (or also known as Jalan Sungai Jan in Jerantut) (formerly Pahang State Route C9) and Jalan Pekeliling in Kuala Lipis (formerly Pahang State Route C159)), is a federal road in Pahang, Malaysia. The roads connects Jerantut in the east until Kuala Lipis in the west. It is also a main route to Taman Negara (National Park) in Kuala Tembeling. The route starts at Jerantut, at its interchange with the Federal Route 64.

In 2012, the highway was gazetted as Federal Route 234.

== Features ==
The Federal Route 234 was built under the JKR R5 road standard, allowing a maximum speed limit of up to 90 km/h.

== List of junctions and towns ==
Km	Exit	Junctions	To	Remarks
FT 234; 0		Jerantut	West; FT 64 Benta; FT 64 Raub; FT 8 Kuala Lipis East; FT 64 Bandar Pusat Jengka; FT 64 Maran South; FT 98 Temerloh; FT 98 Mentakab; FT 98 Kuala Kerau; East Coast Expressway AH141 East Coast Expressway; Kuala Lumpur; Kuantan; Kuala Terengganu	Junctions
FT 64 Jalan Benta–Maran
FT 234 Jalan Jerantut–Kuala Lipis
		Jerantut		
		Jerantut		
		Jerantut; Kampung Batu Embun		
		Jerantut; Kampung Batu Embun Seberang	East; C145 Jalan Mangsuk; Mangsuk; Pedah	T-junctions
		Kampung Teh		
		Kuala Teh		
		Sungai Teh bridge		
		Kampung Tanjung Betung		
		Kampung Rial		
		Kampung Besul		
		Sungai Besul bridge		
		Kampung Tanjung Gatal		
		Kampung Guai		
		Sungai Kerak bridge		
		Kampung Kuala Retang		
		Kuala Tembeling		
		Kuala Tembeling	Masjid Kuala Tembeling	
		Kuala Tembeling	North; Kuala Tembeling Jetty (Ferry to Taman Negara (National Park)); Tourist Information Centre	T-junctions
		Kampung Tanjung Bungor		
		Kampung Serdang		
		Kampung Temunga		
		Kampung Durian Anggang		
		Mela		
		Mela	South; C160 Jalan Samak Jani; Mela; Samak Jani	T-junctions
		Kampung Atil		
		Sungai Cheka bridge		
Jerantut-Lipis district border
		Kampung Hulu Lik Kecil		
		Kampung Ganding		
		Kampung Mempelas		
		Kampung Aur		
		Kampung Beluan		
		Kampung Nuar		
		Kampung Tanjung Buluh		
		Kerambit	North; Jalan Pekan Kerambit; Kerambit; Kerambit Railway Station	T-junctions
		Railway crossing bridge		
		Kerambit	South; C160 Jalan Samak Jani; Sungai Lik; Samak Jani	T-junctions
		Kerambit	West; FT 64 Benta; FT 8 Raub	T-junctions
		Kampung Jeram Bungor		
		Kampung Kuala Lanar		
		Kampung Tanjung Lipis		
		Tanjung Lipis Rest House	Tanjung Lipis Rest House	T-junctions
		Sungai Lipis bridge		
		Kuala Lipis; Town Centre	North; FT 1506 Jalan Utama Kecau; Town Centre; Masjid Sultan Mahmud (Kuala Lipis District Mosque); Hospital Kuala Lipis Northeast; Kuala Lipis District and Land Office; Sekolah Menengah Kebangsaan Clifford (Secondary School)	Roundabout
		Lipis District Police Headquarters		
		Kuala Lipis		
		Kuala Lipis Magistrate High Court		
		Kuala Lipis; Kampung Tanjung Rambai		
		Medan Selera Jalan Bidai (Food Court)		
FT 234 Jalan Jerantut–Kuala Lipis
FT 8 Kuala Lumpur–Kota Bharu Highway
		Kuala Lipis	Northwest; FT 8 Padang Tengku; FT 8 Gua Musang; FT 8 Kuala Krai; FT 8 Kota Bharu; FT 185 Ipoh; FT 102 Cameron Highlands South; FT 8 Benta; FT 8 Raub; FT 8 Bentong; North–South Expressway Southern Route FT 2 AH141 Kuala Lumpur	T-junctions
