= Nebria storkani =

Scientific classification
- Domain: Eukaryota
- Kingdom: Animalia
- Phylum: Arthropoda
- Class: Insecta
- Order: Coleoptera
- Suborder: Adephaga
- Family: Carabidae
- Genus: Nebria
- Species: N. storkani

Binomial name
- Nebria storkani Maran, 1939

Species of beetle

Nebria storkani is a species of ground beetle in the Nebriinae subfamily that is endemic to Greece.
