= Malaysia Federal Route 1537 =

Road in Malaysia

Federal Route 1537
- Jalan Utama Jengka Barat-Timur

Route information
- Maintained by Malaysian Public Works Department

Major junctions
- West end: FT 62 Jalan Bandar Pusat Jengka Timur
- FT 62 Jalan Bandar Pusat Jengka Timur; FT 64 Federal Route 64
- East end: FT 64 Jalan Jerantut-Maran

Location
- Country: Malaysia
- Primary destinations: Bandar Pusat Jengka

Highway system
- Highways in Malaysia; Expressways; Federal; State

Jalan Utama Jengka Barat-Timur, Federal Route 1537, is the main federal roads in Bandar Pusat Jengka, Pahang, Malaysia.

At most sections, the Federal Route 1537 was built under the JKR R5 road standard, with a speed limit of 90 km/h.

== List of junctions ==
km	Exit	Junctions	To	Remarks
		Jalan Bandar Pusat Jengka Timur	FT 62 Jalan Bandar Pusat Jengka Timur; West; Bandar Pusat Jengka; East Coast Expressway East Coast Expressway; Kuala Lumpur; Temerloh South; Temerloh; Maran	T-junctions
		Ulu Jempol Estate		
Jengka Triangle
Jengka Triangle-Maran sub-district border
		Jalan Jerantut-Maran	West; FT 64 Jerantut; FT 64 Benta; FT 8 Kuala Lipis; FT 8 Raub; FT 64 Taman Negara Southeast; FT 64 Maran; East Coast Expressway East Coast Expressway; Kuala Terengganu; Kuantan	T-junctions
