= Tun Abdul Razak Stadium =

Stadium in Maran, Pahang, Malaysia

Coordinates: 3°46′19″N 102°32′45″E

Tun Abdul Razak Stadium Stadium Tun Abdul Razak
- STAR
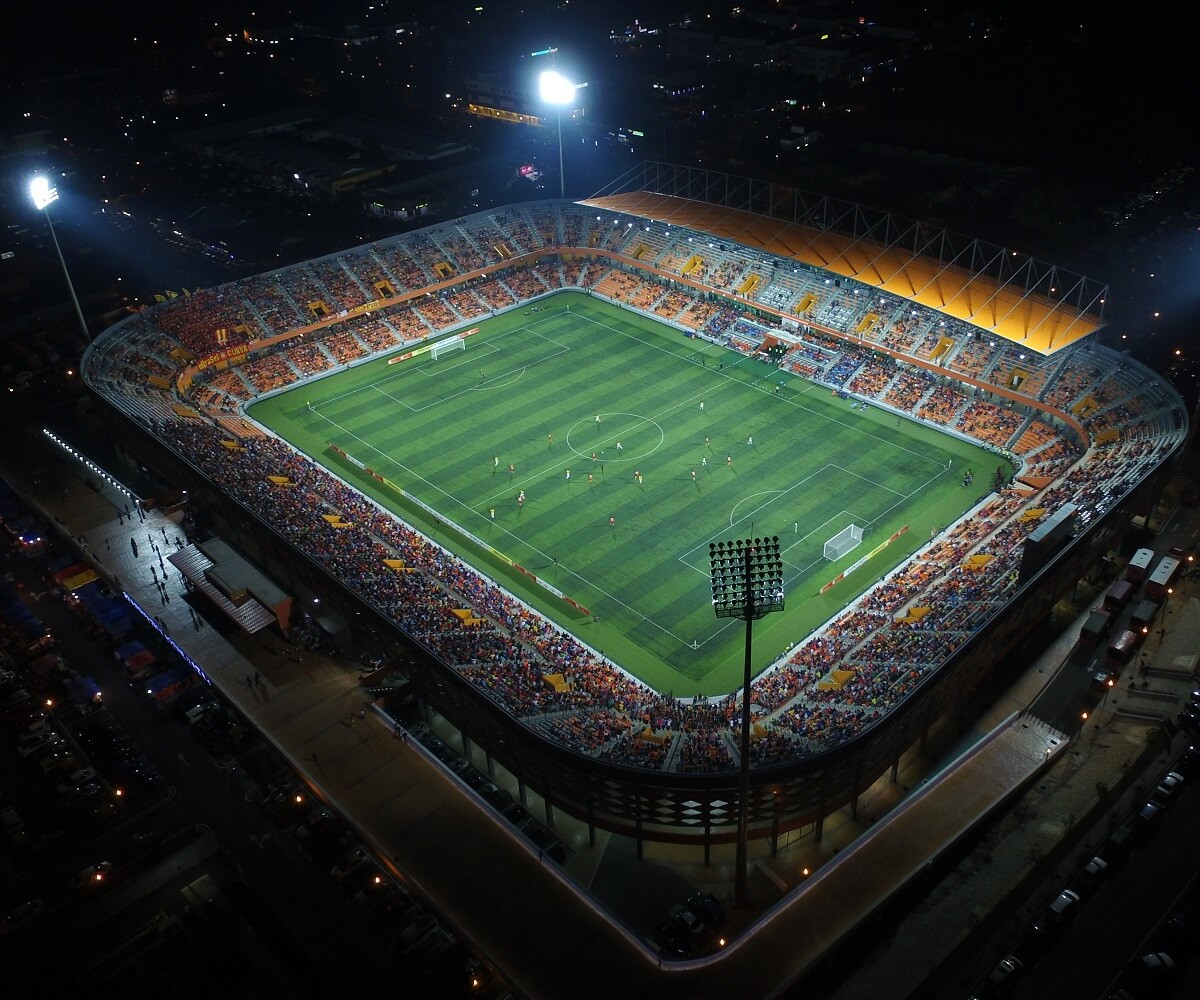
- Aerial view of the stadoum
- Interactive map of Tun Abdul Razak Stadium; Stadium Tun Abdul Razak
- Location: Bandar Pusat Jengka, Maran, Pahang, Malaysia
- Owner: Federal Land Development Authority
- Operator: Felda United
- Capacity: 25,000
- Surface: Artificial Grass
- Scoreboard: Yes

Construction
- Groundbreaking: 2013
- Built: 1 April 2013
- Opened: 15 December 2015
- Cost: RM 80–100 million
- Main contractors: Konsortium Warisan Jengka Holdings (M) Sdn Bhd and Johawaki Sdn Bhd

Tenants
- Felda United (2016–2020); Jerantut FA (selected matches)

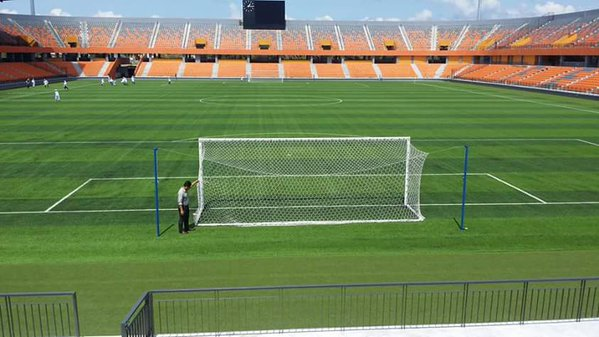
View from inside the stadium

The Tun Abdul Razak Stadium (STAR, Malay: Stadium Tun Abdul Razak) is a football stadium in Jengka, Maran District, Pahang, Malaysia. It is currently used primarily for football matches. The stadium holds 25,000 people and opened in 2015. It was named after former prime minister of Malaysia, Tun Abdul Razak. The stadium was used for the first time in the final match of Piala Pengerusi Felda 2015, between Felda Wilayah Jengka and Felda Wilayah Gua Musang.

== Attendances ==
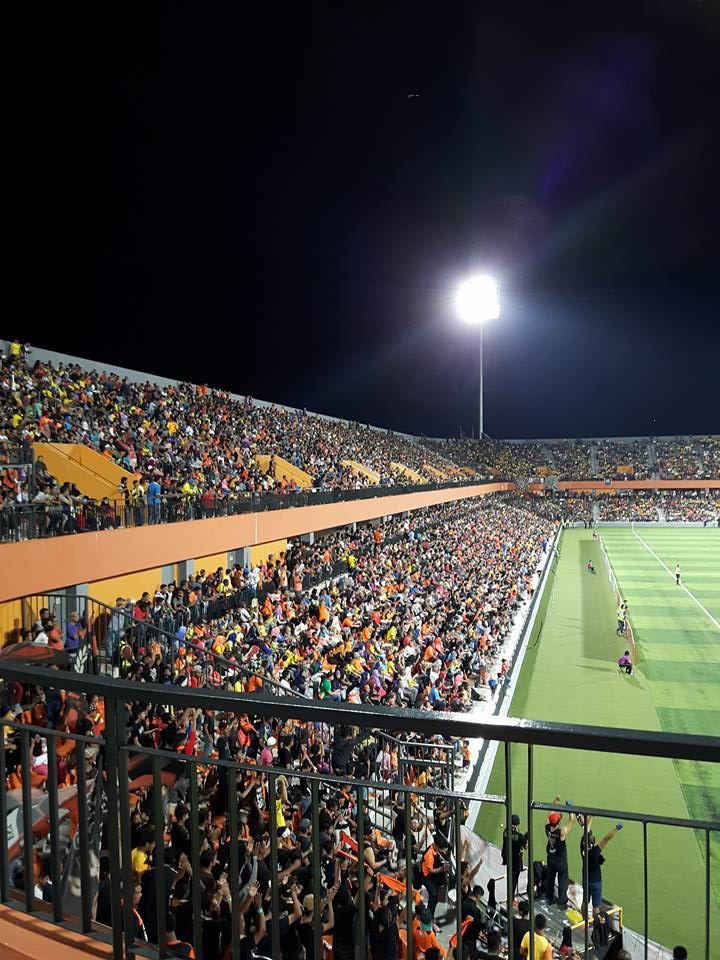
Spectators side.

The average and highest attendances at Felda United domestic league competitions:

Year	Average	Highest	Competition
2016	7,487	16,640	2016 Malaysia Super League
2017	2,854	18,500	2017 Malaysia Super League

== See also ==
- List of stadiums in Malaysia
