= Jalan Jengka 1 =

Federal road in Malaysia

Federal Route 1542
- Jalan Jengka 1

Route information
- Maintained by Malaysian Public Works Department

Major junctions
- Northwest end: FT 64 Jalan Jerantut-Maran
- FT 64 Federal route 64; Jalan Kampung Perak
- Southeast end: FT 64 Jalan Jerantut-Maran

Location
- Country: Malaysia
- Primary destinations: FELDA Anggerik Jengka 1

Highway system
- Highways in Malaysia; Expressways; Federal; State

Jalan Jengka 1, Federal Route 1542, is a main federal road in Bandar Pusat Jengka, Pahang, Malaysia.

At most sections, the Federal Route 1542 was built under the JKR R5 road standard, allowing maximum speed limit of up to 90 km/h.

== List of junctions and towns ==
km	Exit	Junctions	To	Remarks
		Jalan Jerantut-Maran	West; FT 64 Jerantut; FT 64 Benta; FT 8Kuala Lipis; FT 8Raub; FT 64Taman Negara; East Coast Expressway East Coast Expressway; Kuala Lumpur; Temerloh Southeast; FT 64Maran	T-junctions
		Jerantut-Jengka Territory sub-district border		
		Jalan Kampung Perak	South; Jalan Kampung Perak; FELDA Mawar Jengka 10; Bandar Pusat Jengka	T-junctions
		FELDA Anggerik Jengka 1		
		Jengka Territory-Jerantut sub-district border		
		Jalan Jerantut-Maran	West; FT 64 Jerantut; FT 64 Benta; FT 8Kuala Lipis; FT 8Raub; FT 64Taman Negara Southeast; FT 64Maran; East Coast Expressway East Coast Expressway; Kuala Terengganu; Kuantan	T-junctions
