= Kampung Munti =

- Location within Borneo
- Coordinates: 1.51667°N 109.85°E
- Country: Malaysia
- State: Sarawak
- Administrative Division: Lundu
- Elevation: 16 m (52 ft)

Kampung Munti is a settlement in the Lundu division of Sarawak, Malaysia. It lies approximately 54.3 kilometres (34 mi) west of the state capital Kuching.

Neighbouring settlements include:

- Kampung Selampit 3.7 kilometres (2.3 mi) north
- Kampung Kabong 4.1 kilometres (2.5 mi) northwest
- Kampung Rasa 5.9 kilometres (3.7 mi) north
- Kampung Perian 5.9 kilometres (3.7 mi) north
- Kampung Rasau Lalang 6.7 kilometres (4.2 mi) southeast
- Pangkalan Stungkor 7.6 kilometres (4.7 mi) east
- Kampung Bukit Batu 9.3 kilometres (5.8 mi) northwest
- Kampung Sebandi Ulu 9.3 kilometres (5.8 mi) north
- Kampung Panchau 9.5 kilometres (5.9 mi) west
- Kampung Pegong 10 kilometres (6.2 mi) west
