= Jalan Jengka 4 =

Road in Malaysia

Federal Route 1543
- Jalan Jengka 4

Route information
- Maintained by Malaysian Public Works Department

Major junctions
- South end: FT 62 Jalan Bandar Pusat Jengka Timur
- FT 62 Jalan Bandar Pusat Jengka Timur
- North end: FELDA Jengka 4

Location
- Country: Malaysia

Highway system
- Highways in Malaysia; Expressways; Federal; State

Jalan Jengka 4, Federal Route 1543, is a main federal road in Bandar Pusat Jengka, Pahang, Malaysia.

At most sections, the Federal Route 1543 was built under the JKR R5 road standard, allowing maximum speed limit of up to 90 km/h.

== List of junctions ==
km	Exit	Junctions	To	Remarks
		Jalan Bandar Pusat Jengka Timur	FT 62 Jalan Bandar Pusat Jengka Timur; North; Bandar Pusat Jengka; South; Temerloh; Maran; East Coast Expressway East Coast Expressway; Kuala Lumpur; Kuala Terengganu; Kuantan	T-junctions
		FELDA Jengka 4 Welcome arch		
		FELDA Jengka 4		
