= Taman Inderapura =

Taman Inderapura is a government housing development in the New Town area of Jerantut, Pahang, Malaysia (also called Inderapura Town). It is a project of the state government in conjunction with PASDEC Holding Berhad.

== Building Phases ==
There were 6 different building phases. The first and second phase are terrace houses; the third phase comprises semi-detached houses; the fourth and fifth phases again are terrace houses; the sixth and final phase consists of single story houses.
