= Malaysia Federal Route 1531 =

Road in Malaysia

Federal Route 1531
- Jalan Ulu Jempol

Route information
- Maintained by Malaysian Public Works Department

Major junctions
- Northeast end: FT 64 Jalan Jerantut-Maran
- FT 64 Federal route 64; FT 62 Jalan Bandar Pusat Jengka Timur
- Southwest end: FT 62 Jalan Bandar Pusat Jengka Timur

Location
- Country: Malaysia
- Primary destinations: FELDA Ulu Jempol

Highway system
- Highways in Malaysia; Expressways; Federal; State

Jalan Ulu Jempol, Federal Route 1531 is the main federal roads in Bandar Pusat Jengka, Pahang, Malaysia.

At most sections, the Federal Route 1531 was built under the JKR R5 road standard, allowing maximum speed limit of up to 90 km/h.

== List of junctions and towns ==
km	Exit	Junctions	To	Remarks
		Jalan Jerantut-Maran	West; FT 64 Jerantut; FT 64 Benta; FT 8Kuala Lipis; FT 8Raub; FT 64Taman Negara Southeast; FT 64Maran; East Coast Expressway East Coast Expressway; Kuala Terengganu; Kuantan	T-junctions
		Maran-Jengka Territory sub-district border		
		FELDA Ulu Jempol		
		Jalan Bandar Pusat Jengka Timur	FT 62 Jalan Bandar Pusat Jengka Timur; West; Bandar Pusat Jengka; East Coast Expressway East Coast Expressway; Kuala Lumpur; Temerloh South; Temerloh; Maran	T-junctions
