= Pangkalan Stungkor =

- Location within Borneo
- Coordinates: 1.5°N 109.91667°E
- Country: Malaysia
- State: Sarawak
- Administrative Division: Lundu
- Elevation: 57 m (187 ft)

Pangkalan Stungkor (also known as Pang Stungkor) is a settlement in Lundu District, Kuching Division, Sarawak, Malaysia. It lies approximately 47.3 kilometres (29 mi) west-south-west of the state capital Kuching.

Neighbouring settlements include:

- Kampung Stungkor 5.2 kilometres (3.2 mi) southeast
- Kampung Rasau Lalang 5.2 kilometres (3.2 mi) southwest
- Kampung Munti 7.6 kilometres (4.7 mi) west
- Kampung Selampit 9.3 kilometres (5.8 mi) northwest
- Kampung Perian 9.3 kilometres (5.8 mi) northwest
- Kampung Kabong 11.7 kilometres (7.3 mi) west
- Kampung Rasa 11.9 kilometres (7.4 mi) northwest
- Kampung Skebang 13.1 kilometres (8.1 mi) southeast
- Kampung Sekebang Opar 13.4 kilometres (8.3 mi) southeast
- Kampung Sebandi Ulu 13.4 kilometres (8.3 mi) northwest
