= Sri Marathandavar Bala Dhandayuthapani Alayam =

Religion
- Affiliation: Hinduism
- District: Maran
- Deity: Murugan

Location
- State: Pahang
- Country: Malaysia

Architecture
- Type: Dravidian architecture
- Creator: Unknown
- Completed: 120 years ago

Sri Marathandavar Bala Dhandayuthapani Alayam is a temple in Maran District, Pahang, Malaysia. Panguni Uthiram, which occurs during the month of March/April is celebrated in this temple. Numerous devotees come to perform there as well as carry Kavadi.
