= Ulu Cheka =

- Country: Malaysia
- State: Pahang
- District: Jerantut District

Ulu Cheka is a small village in Jerantut District, Pahang, Malaysia.
