= Maran (town) =

Coordinates: 3°35′N 102°46′E

- Town and district capital
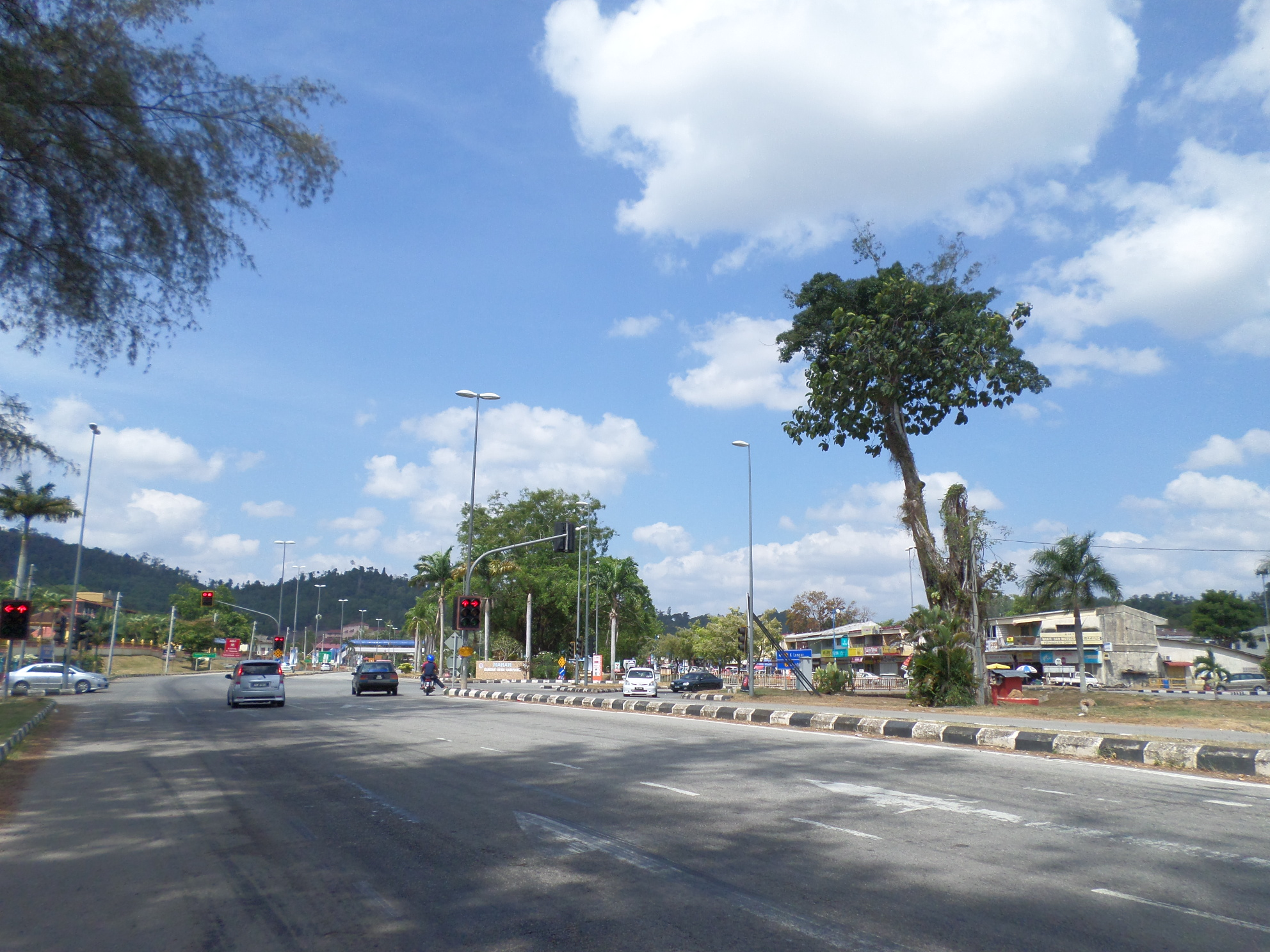

- Flag
- Interactive map of Maran
- Country: Malaysia
- State: Pahang Darul Makmur
- District: Maran District
- Granted municipality status: 2022

Government
  - Body: Maran District Council

Population (2010)
  - Total: 111,056
- Postcode: 26500
- Vehicle registration: C
- MP: Ismail Muttalib (BN)

Maran is a town in Maran District, Pahang, Malaysia. Bandar Tun Abdul Razak, Jengka, is located in the outskirts of the town. Surrounded by isolated forests and oil palm plantations mainly in the area of FELDA Jengka, Maran town is roughly halfway between Temerloh and Kuantan.

== Economy ==
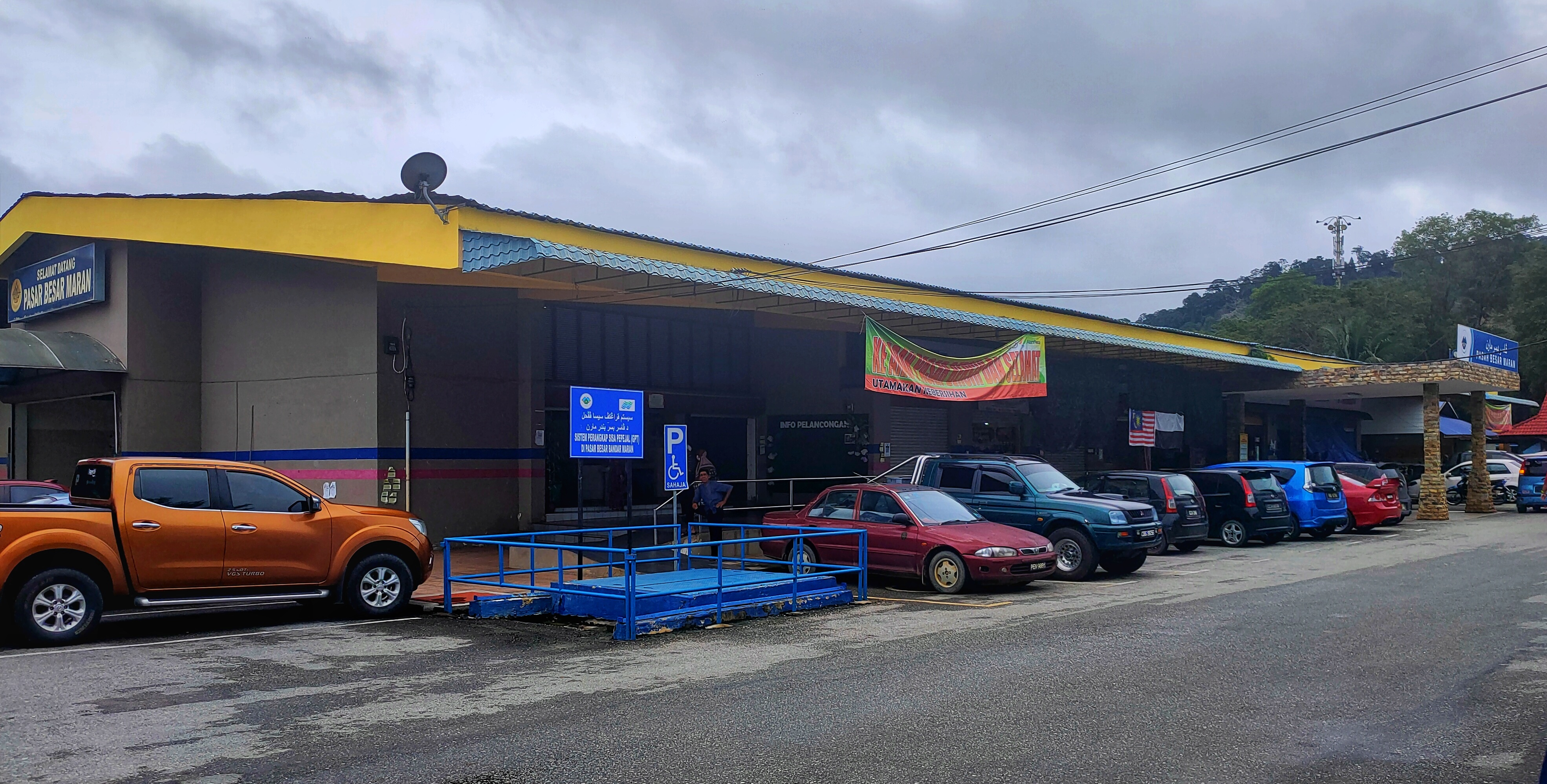
The main market of Maran Town.

The main economic activity in Maran includes plantations, run mainly by the largest settlement of FELDA in Malaysia, the Jengka Settlement. Other economic activity focuses on small enterprises in agriculture, farming, and fishing.

Maran is well-known among Hindus for the Sri Marathandavar Bala Dhandayuthapani Alayam temple, Devotees from across the country and even from Singapore visit to perform their rituals and prayers.

== Transportation ==
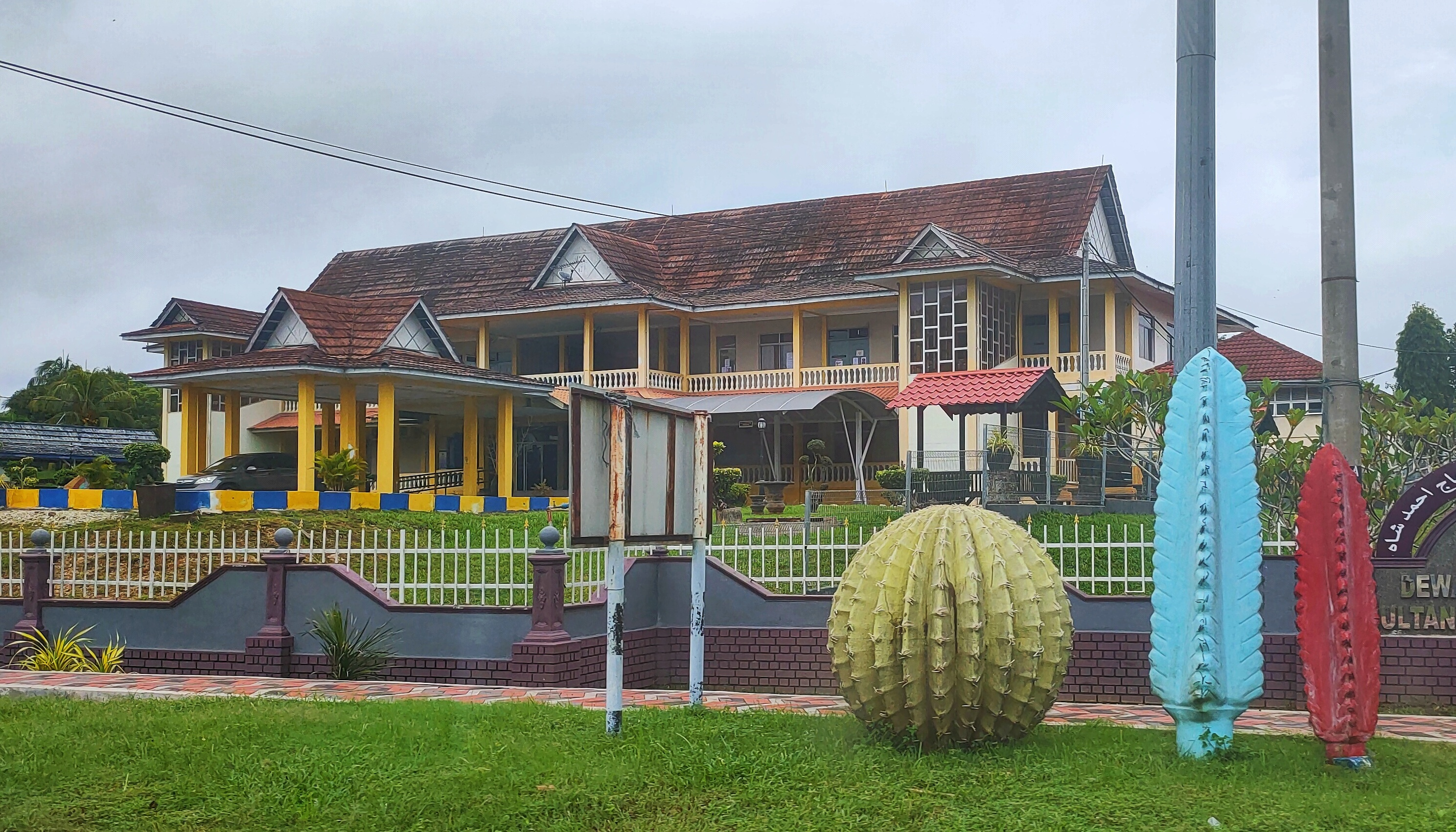
The building of Maran District Council.

=== Public transport ===
Maran, as with Kuantan and most of eastern Pahang, is not served by any rail line. rapidKuantan buses also do not cover Maran currently. Instead, there are Cityliner buses that connect Maran to Kuantan and Jerantut.

=== Car ===
In contrast, going to Maran is much easier by car. The East Coast Expressway has two exits serving Maran constituency: Exit 825 to Maran and Exit 827 to Sri Jaya.

The old Kuala Lumpur-Kuantan federal road, Federal Route 2, runs through downtown Maran. Federal Route 64 connects Maran to Jerantut. Additionally, there is a connection to Pekan, the royal capital of Pahang, through a series of state-level roads and then the Federal Route 82.

== Politics ==
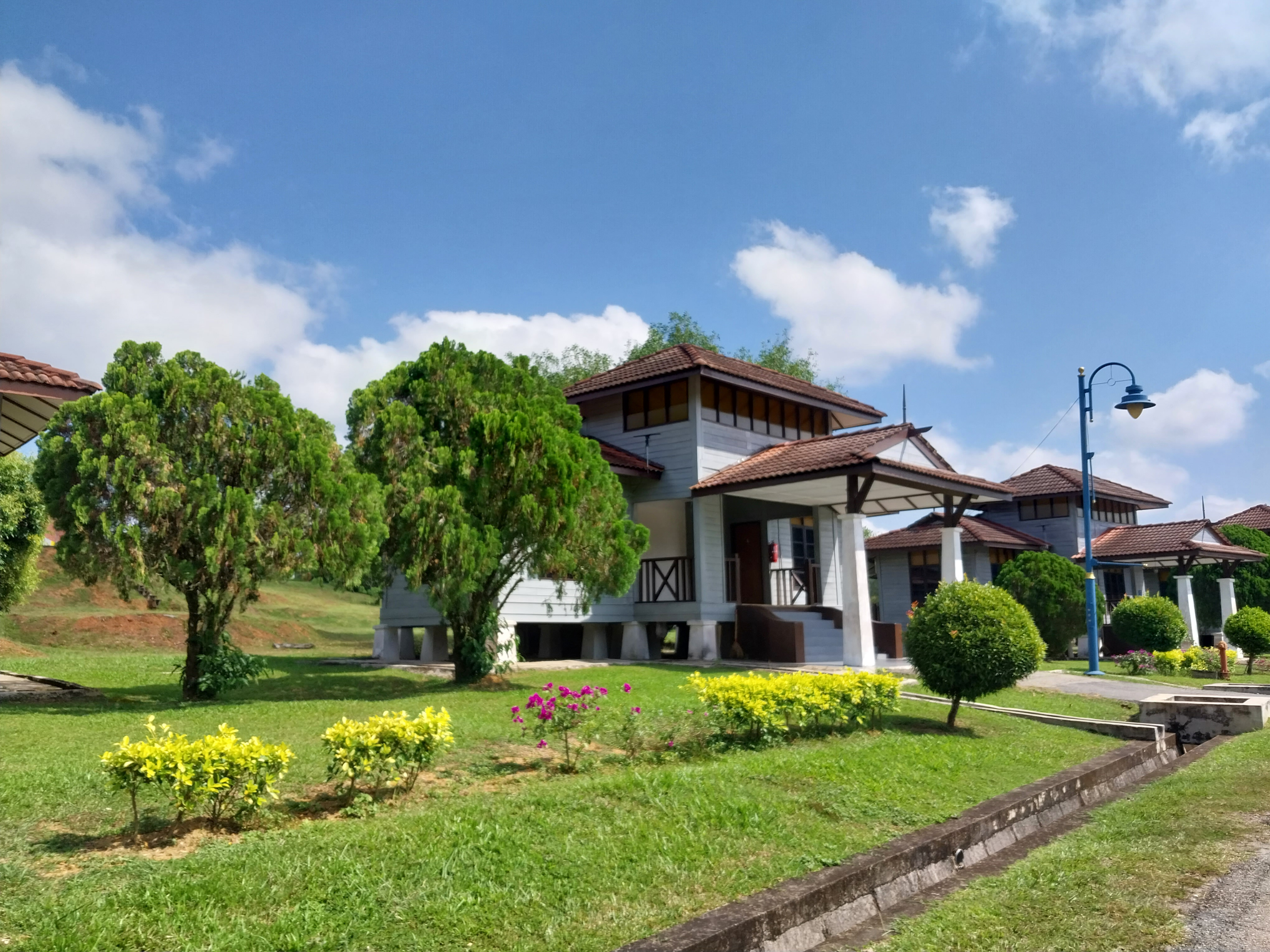
Maran Resort at Taman Tasik Maran.

Maran, in turn, is divided into three state seats in the Pahang State Legislative Assembly:

- Chenor
- Kuala Sentul
- Luit

in which all three are also currently held by Perikatan Nasional (PN). Another state constituency, Jengka, is under the administration of the Maran District Council, but is represented under Kuala Krau's parliamentary constituency.
