= Pulau Tawar =

Coordinates: 3°54′N 102°26′E

Pulau Tawar is a mukim in Jerantut District, Pahang, Malaysia. It is situated on the banks of Sungai Pahang River.

== Traditional Villages ==
1. Kampung Perian
2. Kampung Bukit Rang
3. Kampung Pulau Tawar Baru (Bukit Rang 2
4. Kampung Kedondong
5. Kampung Masjid
6. Kampung Kubang Sekendal
7. Kampung Bandar
8. Kampung Teluk
9. Kampung Merbau
10. Kampung Sungai Siam
11. Kampung Sungai Tekam
12. Kampung Perak

== Felda ==
1. Jengka 8
2. Jengka 9
3. Jengka 24
4. Kota Gelanggi 1
5. Kota Gelanggi 2
6. Kota Gelanggi 3
7. Kota Gelanggi 4
8. Gugusan Lepar
9. Sungai Tekam Utara
10. Sungai Tekam Getah

== Genealogy of Pulau Tawar Family ==
Salasilah Keluarga Pulau Tawar
