= Kuala Tembeling =

Mukim in Pahang, Malaysia

Kuala Tembeling is a mukim in Jerantut District, Pahang, Malaysia. The town serves as a transfer point to Taman Negara National Park, linking road transportation from various cities with boat rides to the park via the town's jetty.
