= Kampung Perian =

Coordinates: 3°54′N 102°26′E

Kampung Perian is a village within the settlement of Pulau Tawar, in Jerantut District, Pahang, Malaysia.
