= Mukim =

Type of administrative division used in Brunei, Indonesia, Malaysia, and Singapore

A mukim (Jawi: مقيم from Arabic مقيم muqīm ‘residence’) is a type of administrative division used in Malaysia, Brunei, Indonesia and Singapore, equivalent to a subdistrict.

== Usage ==
=== Brunei ===
In Brunei, a mukim is the immediate subdivision of a district (Malay: daerah). The equivalent English word for 'mukim' is 'township'. There are 38 mukims in Brunei. Each mukim is an administrative area made up of several villages (kampung). A mukim is headed by a headman (penghulu), which is an elected office. The number of mukims in each of the districts in Brunei is as follows:

Number of Mukims for each district in Brunei
District	Number of Mukims	Map
Belait	8	
Brunei-Muara	17	
Temburong	5	
Tutong	8	

The smallest mukim by area is Mukim Saba in the Brunei-Muara District. The largest mukim by area is Mukim Sukang in the Belait District. The last change in the mukim boundaries was in the late 1990s when Mukim Kumbang Pasang was merged into Mukim Kianggeh and Mukim Berakas was divided into Mukim Berakas A and Mukim Berakas B. The number of mukims remained at 38.

=== Indonesia ===
The term mukim is used only in the autonomous province of Aceh as a subdivision of a district (kecamatan). A mukim contains several villages (gampong).

=== Malaysia ===
In Malaysia, a mukim of almost all constituent states except Perlis, Kelantan, Sabah and Sarawak can either be a subdivision of a daerah (district or county) or a subdivision of an autonomous sub-district (daerah kecil), as per Section 11(c) of the 1965 National Land Code. Each mukim comprises one or several villages (kampung) with a population between 4,000–200,000 people represented with a mosque or surau as a communal centre; it may overlap with residential neighbourhoods (taman perumahan or taman for short) in urban areas. Mukim may be translated roughly in English to townships.

The northern state of Perlis, due to its small size, is not divided into daerahs, but directly into mukims. In Kelantan, the term daerah corresponds equally to the mukim as subdivisions of a jajahan; whilst Sarawak and its large size in East Malaysia are directly divided into divisions and in turn, divisions are divided into districts and the subdivision of each district is termed as a land district (daerah tanah) or town district (daerah bandar) instead. The neighbouring state of Sabah does not have such subdivisions, districts serve instead as the lowest jurisdictional level. In the federal territory of Putrajaya, "precincts" (presint) are the equivalent to the mukim.

Number of Mukims for each state in Peninsular Malaysia
State	No. of Mukims in the state	District	No. of Mukims in the district	Map
Johor	96	Batu Pahat	14	
Johor	96	Johor Bahru	6	
Johor	96	Kluang	8	
Johor	96	Kota Tinggi	10	
Johor	96	Kulai	4	
Johor	96	Mersing	14	
Johor	96	Muar	12	
Johor	96	Pontian	11	
Johor	96	Segamat	11	
Johor	96	Tangkak	6	
Kedah	132	Kota Setar	28	
Kedah	132	Kubang Pasu	20	
Kedah	132	Padang Terap	11	
Kedah	132	Langkawi	6	
Kedah	132	Kuala Muda	16	
Kedah	132	Yan	5	
Kedah	132	Baling	8	
Kedah	132	Sik	3	
Kedah	132	Kulim	15	
Kedah	132	Bandar Baharu	6	
Kedah	132	Pendang	8	
Kedah	132	Pokok Sena	6	
Kelantan	311	Bachok	32	
Kelantan	311	Kota Bharu	89	
Kelantan	311	Machang	22	
Kelantan	311	Pasir Mas	48	
Kelantan	311	Pasir Puteh	33	
Kelantan	311	Tanah Merah	18	
Kelantan	311	Tumpat	29	
Kelantan	311	Gua Musang	16	
Kelantan	311	Kuala Krai	17	
Kelantan	311	Jeli	7	
Malacca	80	Melaka Tengah	29	
Malacca	80	Jasin	20	
Malacca	80	Alor Gajah	31	
Negeri Sembilan	61	Jelebu	8	
Negeri Sembilan	61	Kuala Pilah	11	
Negeri Sembilan	61	Port Dickson	5	
Negeri Sembilan	61	Rembau	17	
Negeri Sembilan	61	Seremban	8	
Negeri Sembilan	61	Tampin	7	
Negeri Sembilan	61	Jempol	5	
Pahang	72	Bentong	3	
Pahang	72	Cameron Highlands	3	
Pahang	72	Jerantut	10	
Pahang	72	Kuantan	6	
Pahang	72	Lipis	10	
Pahang	72	Pekan	11	
Pahang	72	Raub	7	
Pahang	72	Temerloh	10	
Pahang	72	Rompin	6	
Pahang	72	Maran	4	
Pahang	72	Bera	2	
Penang	81	Central Seberang Perai	21	
Penang	81	North Seberang Perai	16	
Penang	81	South Seberang Perai	16	
Penang	81	Northeast Penang Island	6	
Penang	81	Southwest Penang Island	22	
Perak	81	Batang Padang	4	
Perak	81	Manjung	5	
Perak	81	Kinta	5	
Perak	81	Kerian	8	
Perak	81	Kuala Kangsar	9	
Perak	81	Larut, Matang and Selama	14	
Perak	81	Hilir Perak	5	
Perak	81	Hulu Perak	10	
Perak	81	Perak Tengah	12	
Perak	81	Kampar	2	
Perak	81	Muallim	3	
Perak	81	Bagan Datuk	4	
Perlis	22	—N/a	22	
Selangor	54	Klang	2	
Selangor	54	Kuala Langat	7	
Selangor	54	Kuala Selangor	9	
Selangor	54	Sabak Bernam	5	
Selangor	54	Hulu Langat	7	
Selangor	54	Hulu Selangor	13	
Selangor	54	Petaling	4	
Selangor	54	Gombak	4	
Selangor	54	Sepang	3	
Terengganu	84	Besut	16	
Terengganu	84	Dungun	11	
Terengganu	84	Kemaman	12	
Terengganu	84	Kuala Terengganu	19	
Terengganu	84	Hulu Terengganu	10	
Terengganu	84	Marang	9	
Terengganu	84	Setiu	7	
Terengganu	84	Kuala Nerus	4	
Kuala Lumpur	7	-	01 MUKIM AMPANG	
Kuala Lumpur	7	-	02 MUKIM BATU	
Kuala Lumpur	7	-	03 MUKIM CHERAS	
Kuala Lumpur	7	-	04 MUKIM ULU KELANG	
Kuala Lumpur	7	-	05 MUKIM KUALA LUMPUR	
Kuala Lumpur	7	-	06 MUKIM PETALING	
Kuala Lumpur	7	-	07 MUKIM SETAPAK	

=== Singapore ===
In Singapore, a mukim is a survey district. There are 30 town subdivision survey districts located in the central city area surrounded by 34 mukim or survey districts in the outer regions.

== See also ==
- Divisions of Malaysia
- Administrative divisions of Brunei
- Barangay/Barrio
- Raion/Uyezd/Powiat
- Unincorporated community
- Civil parish
- Kecamatan
- Freguesia
- Sanjak
