= Kuala Lipis =

Town in Pahang, Malaysia

Kuala Lipis Kole Lepeh (Pahang Malay)
- Town and district capital
- Town of Kuala Lipis; Bandar Kuala Lipis
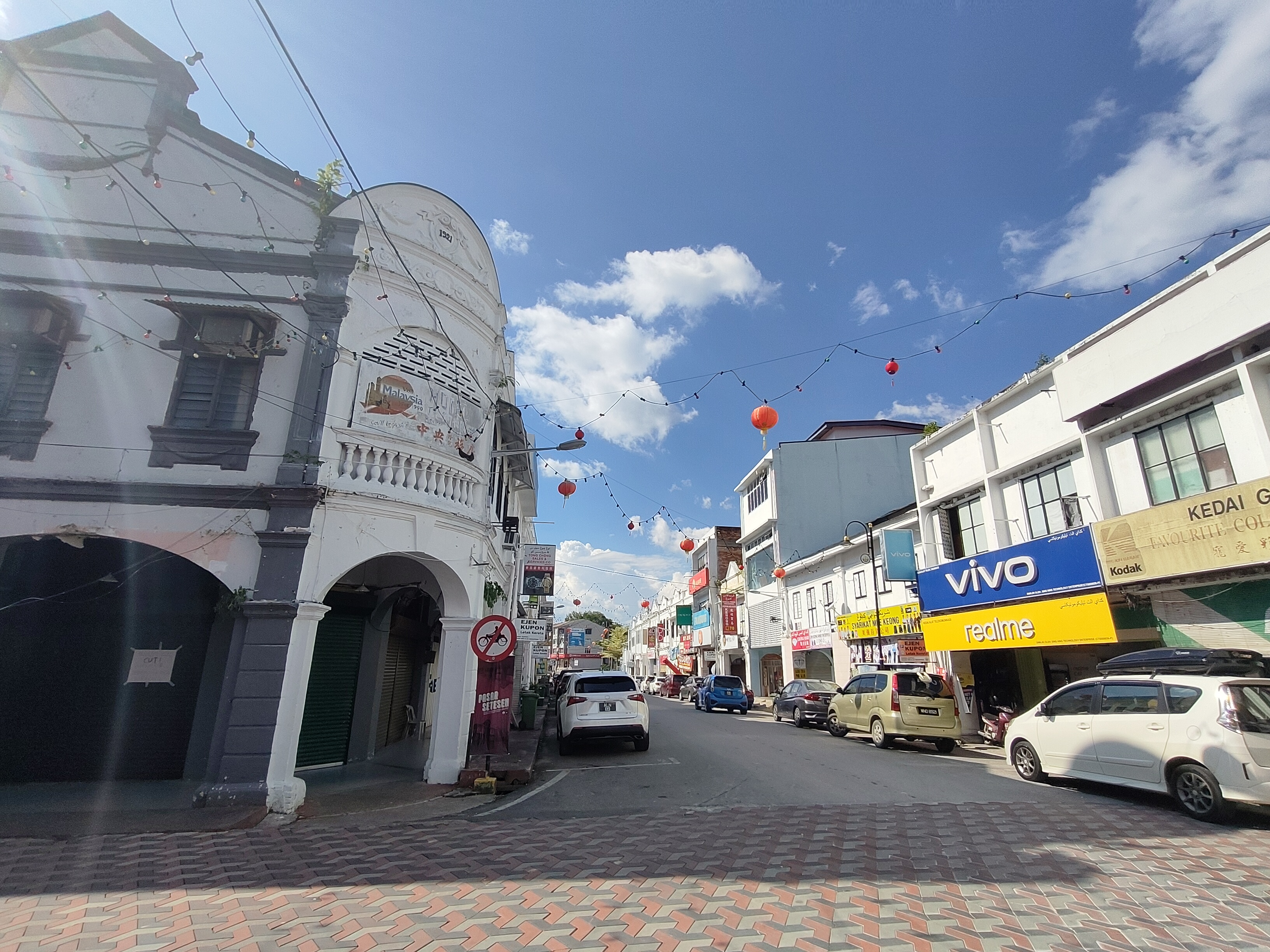
- The old town area of Kuala Lipis.
- Interactive map of Kuala Lipis
- Kuala Lipis in Pahang Kuala Lipis (Malaysia) Kuala Lipis (Southeast Asia)
- Coordinates: 4°11′3.588″N 102°03′15.228″E
- Country: Malaysia
- State: Pahang
- District: Lipis

Government
  - Type: District council
  - Body: Lipis District Council

Population (2010)
  - Total: 15,000
- Postal code: 27200

Kuala Lipis (Pahang Malay: Kole Lepeh) is a mukim and capital of Lipis District, Pahang, Malaysia with a population of 20,000.

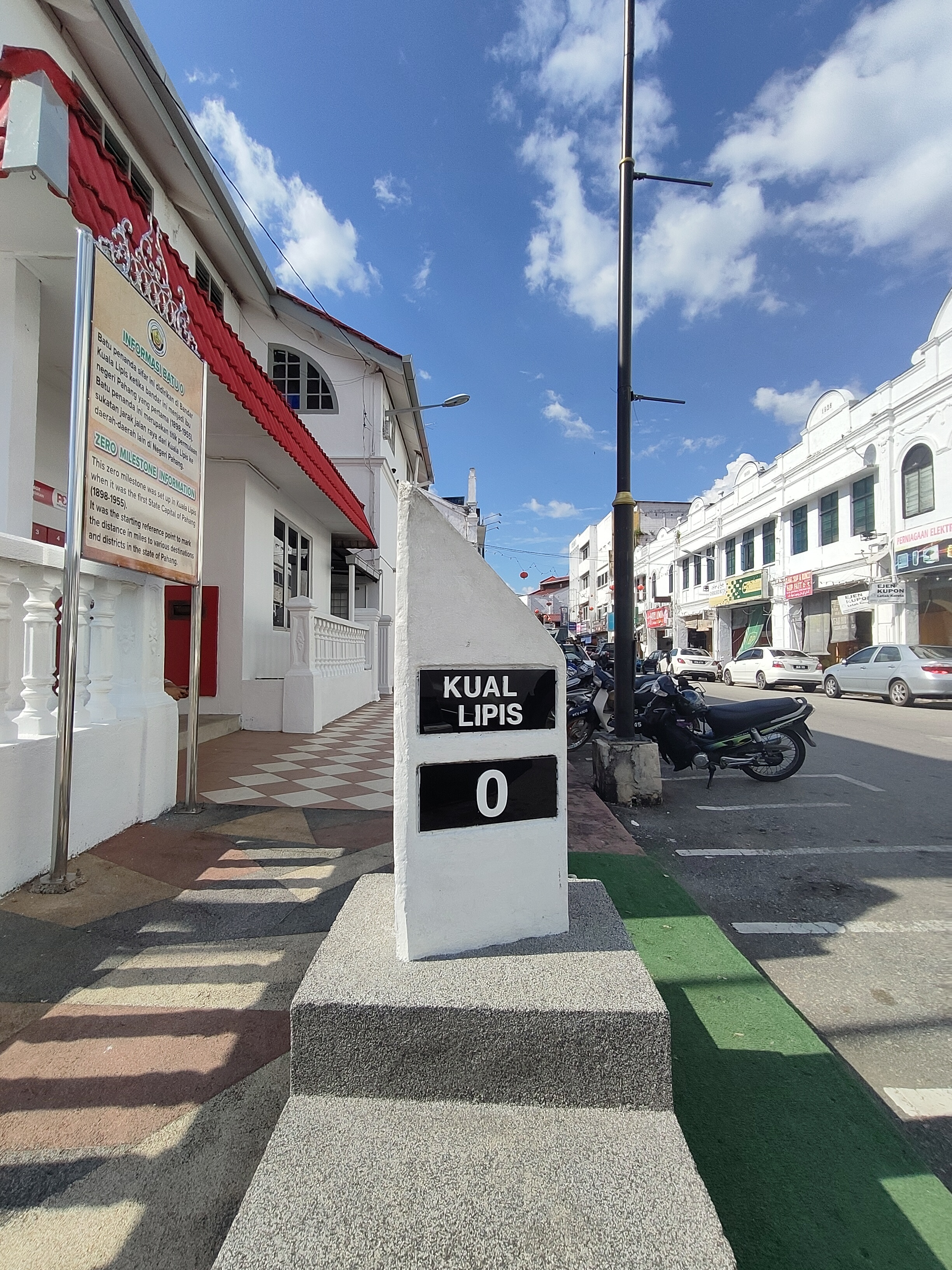
'0' Milestone distance marker, built during the colonial era, near the post office in Kuala Lipis.

== History ==
Kuala Lipis was a gold-mining centre before the British arrived in 1887. In 1898, it became the capital of Pahang within the British-administered Federated Malay States. During this colonial era, grand buildings, such as the imposing district offices, the Clifford School, and the Pahang Club, were built. The hilltop house of the British resident is now a hotel and museum. The town grew and prospered with the coming of the railway in 1924. However, in August 1955, the state capital was shifted to Kuantan, and Kuala Lipis fell into decline.

== Travel ==
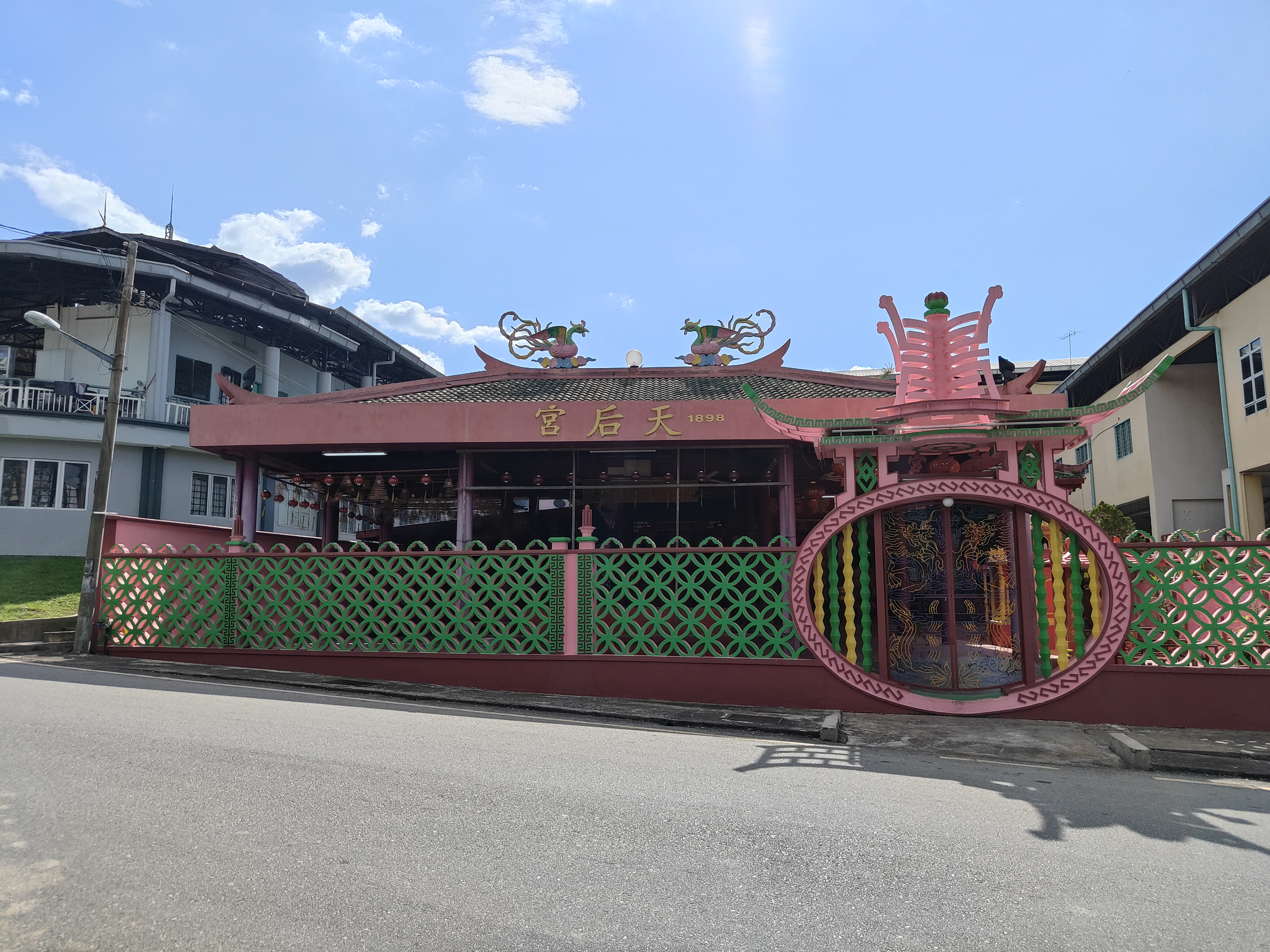
Thean Hou Temple, a Buddhist temple in the middle of the old town of Kuala Lipis. Erected in 1898, it was rebuilt in 1926 after a flood.

=== Interesting Sites ===
- Kuala Lipis old town.
- Hilltop house of the British Resident.
- Lipis District old Office.
- Old railway station
- Clifford School.
- Rumah Banjir.
- Pahang club.
- Lipis Zoo.
- Sungai Jelai.
- Kuala Lipis new town.
- Lipis District new Office.
- Muzium Warisan Lipis (Lipis Heritage Museum).
- Hilltop house of Bukit Bius.
- Hutan Lipur Terenggun.
- Rumah Rakit.

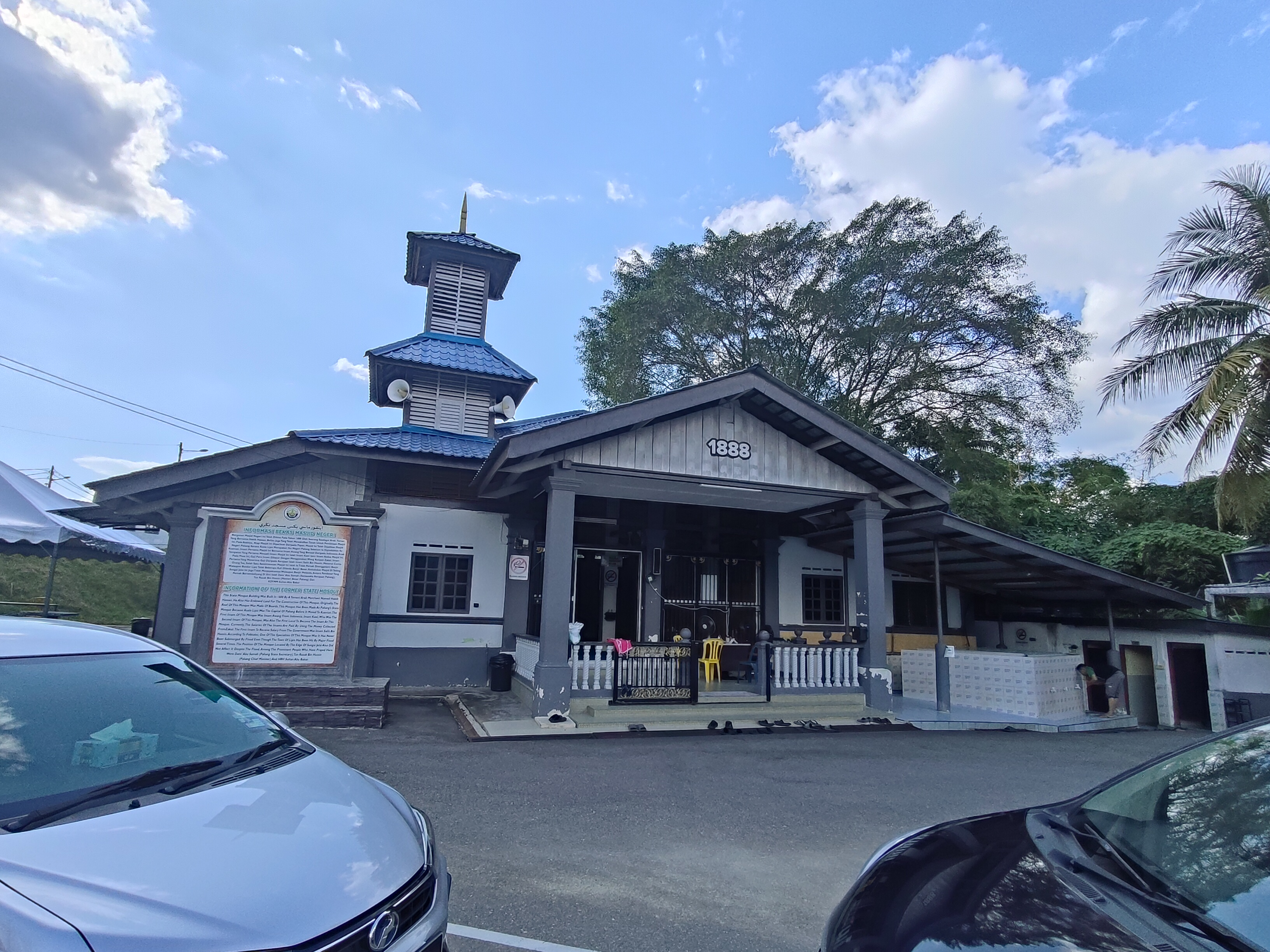
The Old State Mosque was the former state mosque of Pahang before the state capital shifted to a new location. This mosque was built in 1888 by a Yemeni trader.

=== Nature ===
Kuala Lipis has its own nature park, Kenong Rimba Park. It is a forest reserve, which is about 10 km away. Getting to the park requires a bus or cab to Tanjung Kiara Jetty – once there, activities in the reserve are involved, such as trekking, caving or off-roading.

== Access ==
=== Public transport ===
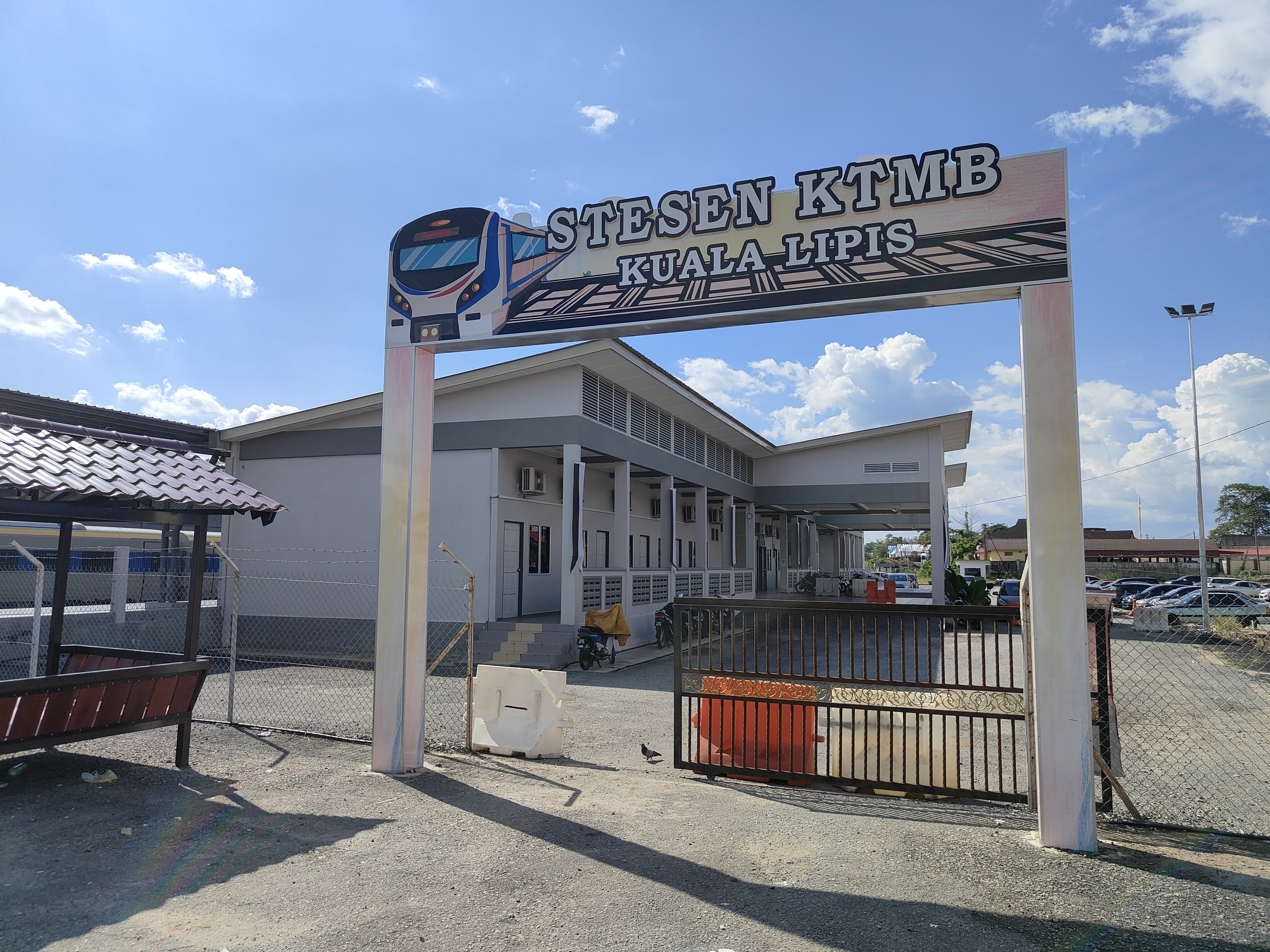
Kuala Lipis railway station, Kuala Lipis, Pahang, Malaysia.

A train station operated by Keretapi Tanah Melayu (KTM) is located near Jalan Pekeliling which is the main road of Kuala Lipis. Pahang Lin Siong express buses connect Kuala Lipis to Titiwangsa LRT/MRT/Monorail station in downtown Kuala Lumpur.

=== Car ===
Kuala Lipis is accessible by Federal Route 8, the main route from Kuala Lumpur to Kota Bharu. It is also connected to Jerantut, the main gateway to Taman Negara, via Federal Route 234. Kuala Lipis is also a major gateway to the hill station of Cameron Highlands via Sungai Koyan using routes 235 and then 102.

== Personalities ==
- Former Prime Minister of Malaysia, Najib Tun Razak was born in Kuala Lipis (but his hometown is in Pekan). On 28 December 2014, Najib visited the flood evacuation centre at the Sekolah Kebangsaan Clifford amidst flood-affected areas.
- Tun Ghazali Shafie was born in Kuala Lipis.
- Malaysian pop diva Siti Nurhaliza also grew up here. Her family still lives in Kuala Lipis and the house she built for them became the talk of town as it was rumoured to cost millions of ringgit. It has now become a tourist attraction. The town council even provided directions to the house on a signboard and made parking space for tour buses available near the house. During her wedding in 2007, her wedding reception for friends and fans here was made an official function for the whole town by the council.
