= Benta =

Town in Lipis District, Pahang, Malaysia

Coordinates: 4°01′N 101°58′E

Benta is a major town in Lipis District, Pahang, Malaysia. Benta town shared the borders with Raub district and is located near the banks of the Lipis river. The town is used as a rest stop for travelers from Kuala Lumpur to Kelantan if using the old road rather than the highway.
