= Lipis District =

- District of Pahang
- Daerah Lipis
- Seal
- Interactive map of Lipis District
- Location of Lipis District in Malaysia
- Coordinates: 4°15′N 101°50′E
- Country: Malaysia
- State: Pahang
- Seat: Kuala Lipis
- Local area government(s): Lipis District Council

Government
  - District officer: YH Dato' Mohd Hafizi Bin Ibrahim

Area
  - Total: 5,168 km^{2} (1,995 sq mi)

Population (2010)
  - Total: 85,341
  - Density: 16.51/km^{2} (42.77/sq mi)
- Time zone: UTC+08:00 (MST)
  - Summer (DST): UTC+08:00 (Not observed)
- Postcode: 27xxx
- Calling code: +6-09
- Vehicle registration plates: C

The Lipis District is a district located in the northwest of Pahang, Malaysia. The district covers an area of 5,198 km^{2}. Lipis District is bordered by Cameron Highlands the northwest, Batang Padang District, Perak on the west, Jerantut District on the east, Gua Musang District, Kelantan to the north and Raub District to its south. Lipis has 10 mukim or subdistricts, the largest being Ulu Jelai. The district capital is Kuala Lipis. During the British colonization, Kuala Lipis was made the state's capital city. Kuala Lipis was the administrative capital of Pahang for 57 years from 1898 until 27 August 1955, when Kuantan was picked as the new capital. Lipis had many types of minerals such as tin and gold, and products from the surrounding forests.

Sungai Relau, near Merapoh, is an alternative entry point (there are about four entry points) into Taman Negara, Malaysia's premier national park and one of the three embarkation points to Gunung Tahan, the highest mountain in Peninsular Malaysia standing at 2,187 meters above sea level.

== Demographics ==
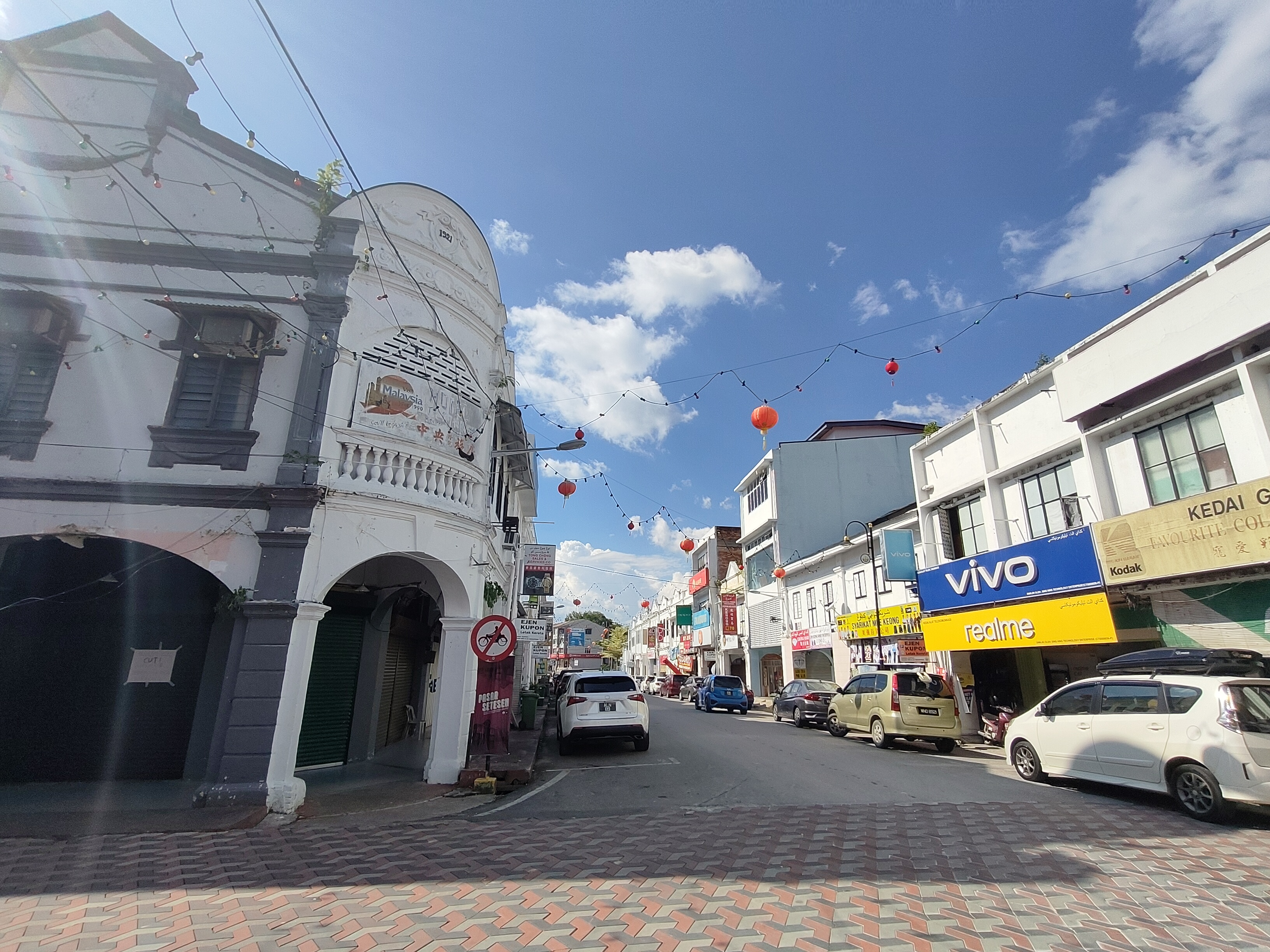
Old Town of Kuala Lipis.

Historical population
Year	Pop.	±%
1991	68,276	—
2000	73,557	+7.7%
2010	86,484	+17.6%
2020	96,620	+11.7%

Lipis is home to 74,581 people (as of 2010), with the Malay/Bumiputra formed the majority (85.3%), the Chinese with 10.5%, the Indian with 4%, while the others 0.2%.

There are 400 speakers of Mintil, a language of the Mayah (Orang Asli) people, remaining in Lipis District.

== Federal Parliament and State Assembly Seats ==
Lipis district representative in the Federal Parliament (Dewan Rakyat)

Parliament	Seat Name	Member of Parliament	Party
P78	Cameron Highlands	Ramli Mohd Nor	BN (UMNO)
P79	Lipis	Abdul Rahman Mohamad	BN (UMNO)

List of Lipis district representatives in the State Legislative Assembly (Dewan Undangan Negeri)

Parliament	State	Seat Name	State Assemblyman	Party
P78	N2	Jelai	Wan Rosdy Wan Ismail	BN (UMNO)
P79	N3	Padang Tengku	Mustapa Long	BN (UMNO)
P79	N4	Cheka	Tuan Ibrahim Tuan Man	PN (PAS)
P79	N5	Benta	Mohammad Soffi Abdul Razak	BN (UMNO)

There is also another state seat, Jelai, which is governed by the Lipis District Council but is represented by the Cameron Highlands parliamentary constituency instead.

== Subdistricts ==
Map of Lipis district.

Lipis District is divided into 10 mukims, which are:

- Batu Yon (115,100 Ha)
- Budu (7,400 Ha)
- Cheka (22,900 Ha)
- Gua (7,588 Ha)
- Hulu Jelai (213,500 Ha)
- Kechau (68,600 Ha)
- Kuala Lipis (9,773 Ha) (Capital)
- Penjom (17,200 Ha)
- Tanjong Besar (13,300 Ha)
- Telang (43,900 Ha)

== Demographics ==
The following is based on Department of Statistics Malaysia 2010 census.

Ethnic groups in Lipis, 2010 census
Ethnicity	Population	Percentage
Bumiputera	74,694	87.5%
Chinese	7,630	8.9%
Indian	2,872	3.4%
Others	145	0.2%
Total	85,341	100%
