= Maran =

Honorific title for rabbis

Maran (Hebrew: מרן) is a Jewish honorific prefix for exceptionally respected rabbis. It is an alternate form of Aramaic mar, meaning "master" (compare rav, rabban).

Maran is especially preferred among Sephardic Jews, and commonly used in reference to Joseph Karo. When used without further qualification, "Maran" typically refers to Karo. Amongst contemporary rabbis, Ovadia Yosef is most closely associated with Maran.

Within their respective communities, rabbis like Yosef Shalom Elyashiv, Elazar Shach and Joel Teitelbaum may be called "Maran" in combination with other titles.

== See also ==
- Honorifics in Judaism
- Mar
- Maranatha
