= Maran District =

- District of Pahang
- Daerah Maran
- Flag Seal

- Location of Maran District in Pahang
- Interactive map of Maran District
- Location of Maran District in Malaysia
- Coordinates: 3°35′N 102°46′E
- Country: Malaysia
- State: Pahang
- Seat: Maran
- Local area government(s): Maran District Council

Government
  - District officer: Syed Ahmad Fuad Syed Taha

Area
  - Total: 1,995.59 km^{2} (770.50 sq mi)

Population (2010)
  - Total: 111,192
  - Density: 55.7189/km^{2} (144.311/sq mi)
- Time zone: UTC+8 (MST)
  - Summer (DST): UTC+8 (Not observed)
- Postcode: 26500
- Calling code: +6-09
- Vehicle registration plates: C

The Maran District is a district in Pahang, Malaysia. Bera district is founded at 1981. Located in the centre of Pahang, the district is surrounded by Kuantan District, Pekan District, Rompin District, Bera District, Temerloh District and Jerantut District clockwisely.

== History ==
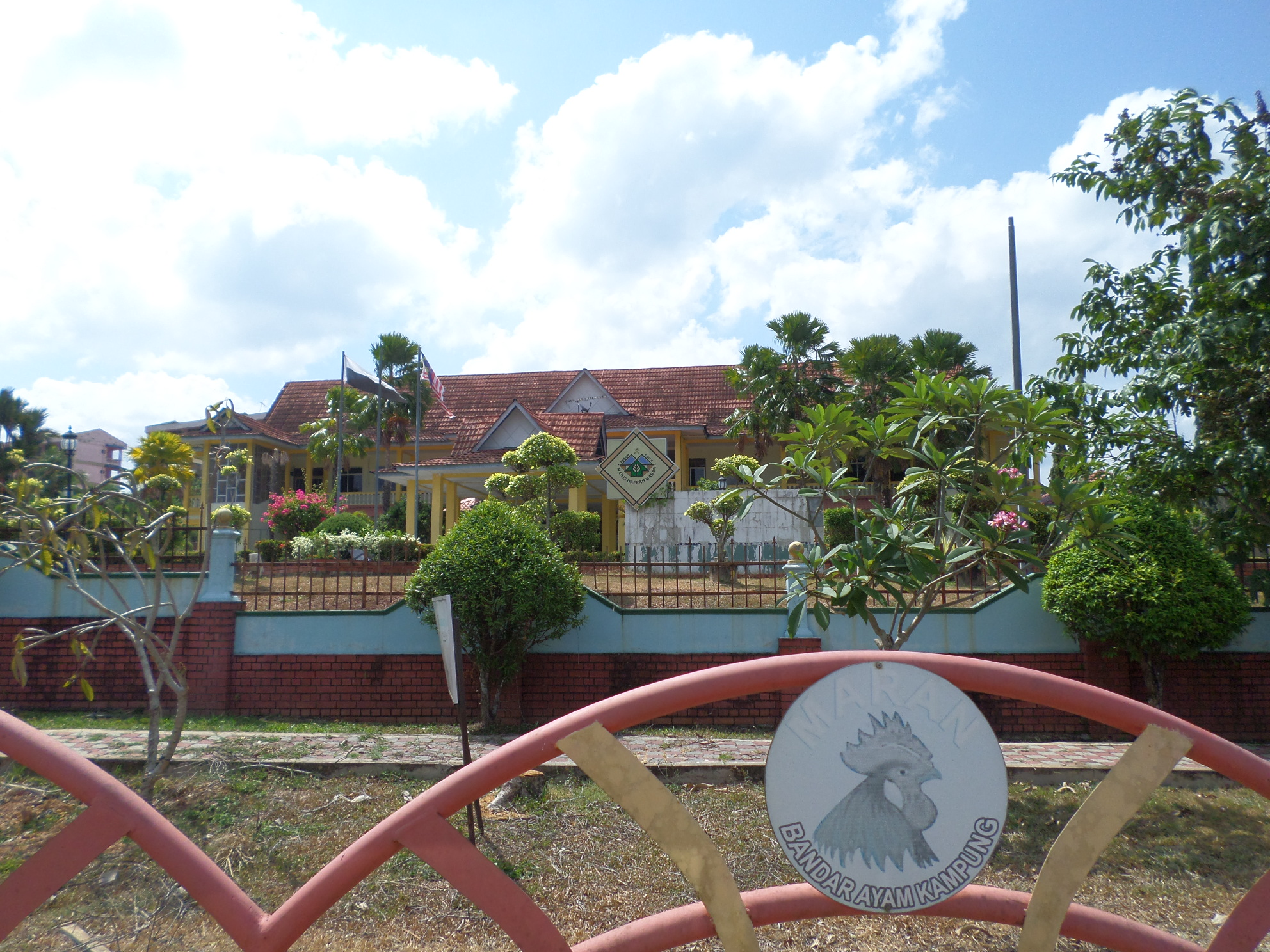
Maran District Council.

Previously Maran was a town council under the administration of the district of Pekan District. In January 1981, Maran town (Mukim Luit), together with some townships in Temerloh districts (Mukim Bukit Segumpal, Chenor, Kertau) were combined to form the new Maran district.

== Administrative divisions ==
Map of Maran district.

There are four mukims in Maran District:

- Bukit Segumpal
- Chenor
- Kertau
- Luit (Maran Town, the seat of the district, is located in this mukim.)

== Federal Parliament and State Assembly Seats ==
List of Maran district representatives in the Federal Parliament (Dewan Rakyat)

Parliament	Seat Name	Member of Parliament	Party
P81	Jerantut	Khairil Nizam Khiruddin	Perikatan Nasional (PAS)
P86	Maran	Ismail Muttalib	Perikatan Nasional (PAS)
P87	Kuala Krau	Kamal Asaari	Perikatan Nasional (PAS)

List of Maran district representatives in the State Legislative Assembly (Dewan Undangan Negeri)

Parliament	State	Seat Name	State Assemblyman	Party
P81	N11	Pulau Tawar	Yohanis Ahmad	Perikatan Nasional (PAS)
P86	N24	Luit	Mohd Sofian Abd Jalil	Perikatan Nasional (PAS)
P86	N25	Kuala Sentul	Jasri Jamaluddin	Perikatan Nasional (PPBM)
P86	N26	Chenor	Mujjibur Rahman Ishak	Perikatan Nasional (PAS)
P87	N29	Jengka	Shahril Azman Abd Halim	Perikatan Nasional (PAS)

== Demographics ==
Historical population
Year	Pop.	±%
1991	110,264	—
2000	112,606	+2.1%
2010	111,056	−1.4%
2020	112,330	+1.1%

The following is based on Department of Statistics Malaysia 2010 census.

Ethnic groups in Maran, 2010 census
Ethnicity	Population	Percentage
Bumiputera	106,406	95.7%
Chinese	3,406	3.1%
Indian	1,219	1.1%
Others	161	0.1%
Total	111,192	100%

== See also ==
- Districts of Malaysia
