= Bandar Tun Razak, Jengka =

Jengka
- Township
- Bandar Tun Razak

Other transcription(s)
  - Jawi: بندر تون رازق
- Interactive map of Jengka
- Coordinates: 3°45′30″N 102°33′20″E
- Country: Malaysia
- State: Pahang
- District: Maran

Government
  - Local government: Maran District Council
- Time zone: UTC+8 (MST)
  - Summer (DST): Not observed
- Postal code: 26400
- Website: mdmaran.gov.my

Bandar Tun Razak, Jengka formerly known as Bandar Pusat Jengka or Jengka Town Centre, is an agricultural town in Maran District, Pahang, Malaysia. Bandar Tun Razak is the centre of the Jengka Triangle which is known as FELDA Jengka. The Jengka Triangle (Malay: Segitiga Jengka), which is the largest FELDA settlement in Malaysia, is one of the successful examples of the Malaysian government's projects to eradicate poverty among its citizens.

== List of FELDA settlements in Jengka Triangle ==
=== FELDA Jengka ===
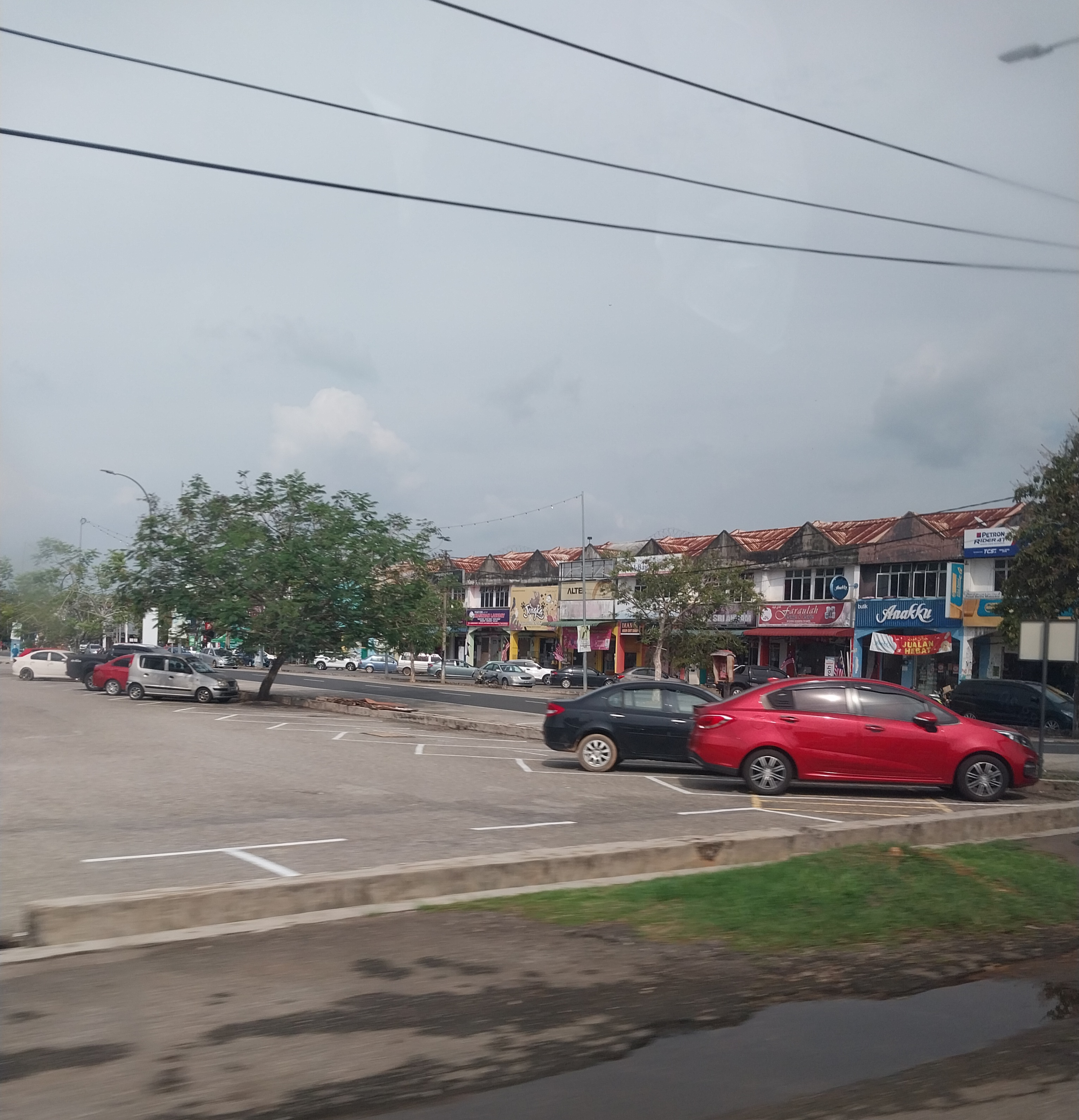
Bandar Jengka.

1. FELDA Anggerik Jengka 1
2. FELDA Cempaka Jengka 2
3. FELDA Dahlia Jengka 3
4. FELDA Kemboja Jengka 4
5. FELDA Kekwa Jengka 5
6. FELDA Keembong Jengka 6
7. FELDA Kenanga Jengka 7
8. FELDA Kesidang Jengka 8
9. FELDA Kesumba Jengka 9
10. FELDA Mawar Jengka 10
11. FELDA Melati Jengka 11
12. FELDA Melor Jengka 12
13. FELDA Puteri Malu Jengka 13
14. FELDA Raya Jengka 14
15. FELDA Semarak Jengka 15
16. FELDA Sena Jengka 16
17. FELDA Seri Pagi Jengka 17
18. FELDA Seroja Jengka 18
19. FELDA Siantan Jengka 19
20. FELDA Tanjung Jengka 20
21. FELDA Teratai Jengka 21
22. FELDA Terkis Jengka 22
23. FELDA Tonkin Jengka 23
24. FELDA ayam Jengka 24
25. FELDA Bougainvillea Jengka 25

=== Others ===
1. FELDA Ulu Jempol
2. FELDA Kampung Awah
3. FELDA Sungai Nerek
4. FELDA Sungai Tekam Utara
5. FELDA Sungai Tekam (Getah)
6. FELDA Kota Gelanggi 1
7. FELDA Kota Gelanggi 2
8. FELDA Kota Gelanggi 4
9. FELDA Padang Piol
10. FELDA Sungai Retang
11. FELDA Kota Gelanggi 3

== Education ==
- Universiti Teknologi Mara (UiTM) Bandar Pusat Jengka Campus
- Kolej Sentral
- Sekolah Kebangsaan Bandar Pusat
- Sekolah Menengah Kebangsaan Jengka Pusat
- Sekolah Kebangsaan Jengka Pusat 2
- Sekolah Menengah Kebangsaan Jengka Pusat 2
- Pahang Engineering Matriculation College (KMKPh)
- Sekolah Menengah Kebangsaan Desa Jaya
- Sekolah Kebangsaan Desa Jaya
- Maahad As Sultan Ahmad Shah ad Dinni

== Facilities ==
- Hospital Jengka
- Masjid Sultan Ahmad Shah, Bandar Pusat Jengka
- Bank Islam Malaysia Bhd
- Nukilan Bookstation Sdn Bhd
- AFFIN Bank
- Bank Rakyat
- Bank Simpanan Nasional
- Maybank
- Agro Bank
- U-Mart
- B5
- 7-Eleven
- KFC
- Anjung Selera (formerly Pagar Food Court)
- Tabung Haji
- Library
- Pejabat Majlis Agama Islam dan Adat Istiadat Pahang
- Police Station
- Fire and Rescue Department
- National Registration Office
- Tenaga Nasional office
- Terminal Bas Nadi Kota, Bandar Pusat Jengka
- Jabatan Bekalan Air Pahang Office
- Pusat Latihan Pertahanan Awam
- Hiasindah Dobi (Laundry)
- Hotel Issoria Jengka
- Rumah Tamu Dona Long
- Travel Agent for flight tickets
- Ezycomp Network (computer services and accessories)
- MYDIN Mall Bandar Tun Razak Jengka
- Arrahnu Pejabat Pos
- Tealive

== Recreation area ==
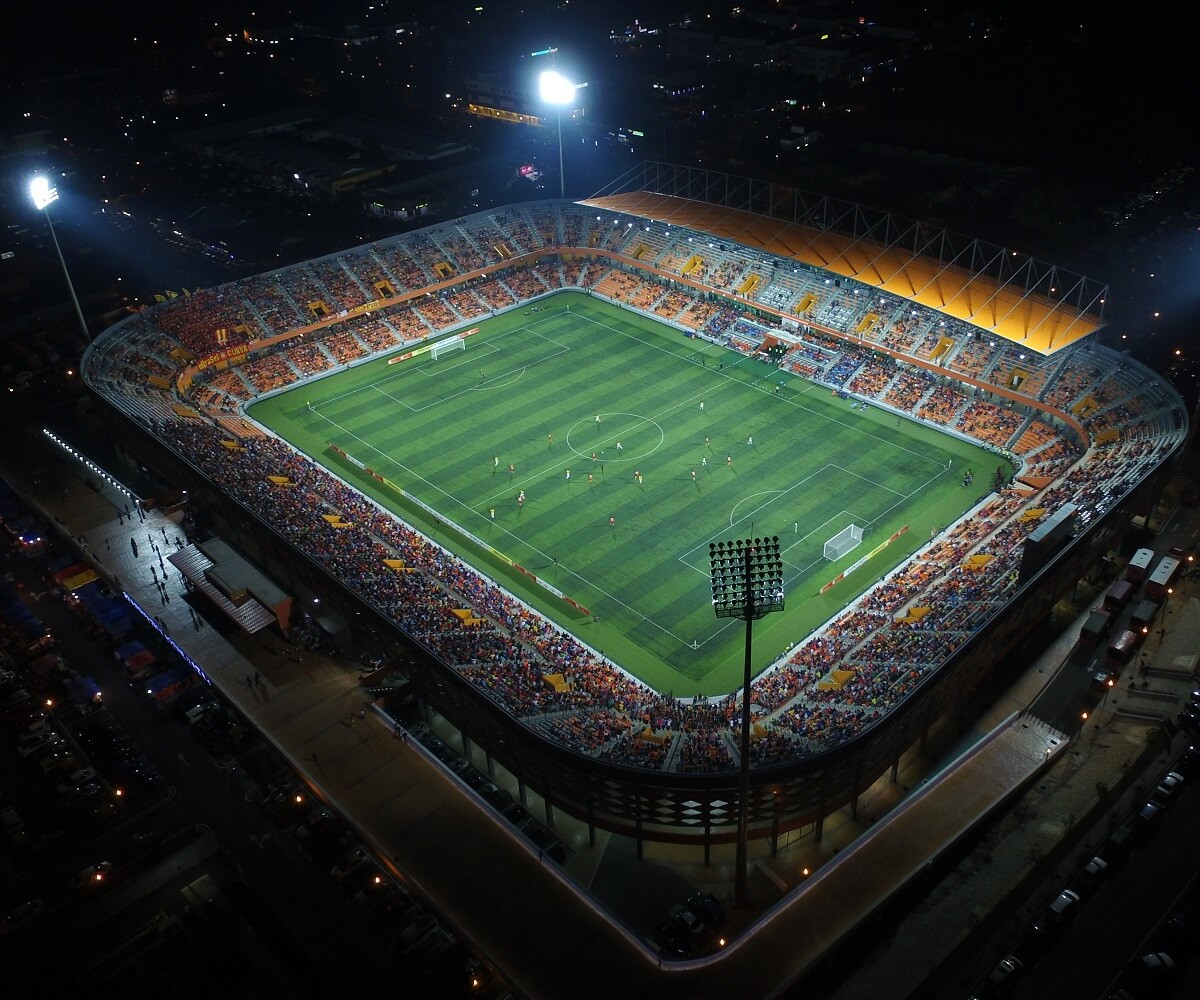
Aerial view of Tun Abdul Razak Stadium.

- Tun Abdul Razak Stadium football stadium and also home of the FELDA United football team
- Hutan Lipur Gunung Senyum
- Air Terjun Lubuk Yu-Ulu Jempul
- Air Terjun Lubuk Jit (Kuala Sentul)
- Gua Kota Gelanggi
- Tekam Plantation Resort
- Kolam pancing - Ulu jempol, Jengka 3,8,12,14,19, Kota Gelangi
