= Jerantut railway station =

Railway station in Jerantut, Malaysia

Coordinates: 3°56′14″N 102°21′28″E

Jerantut

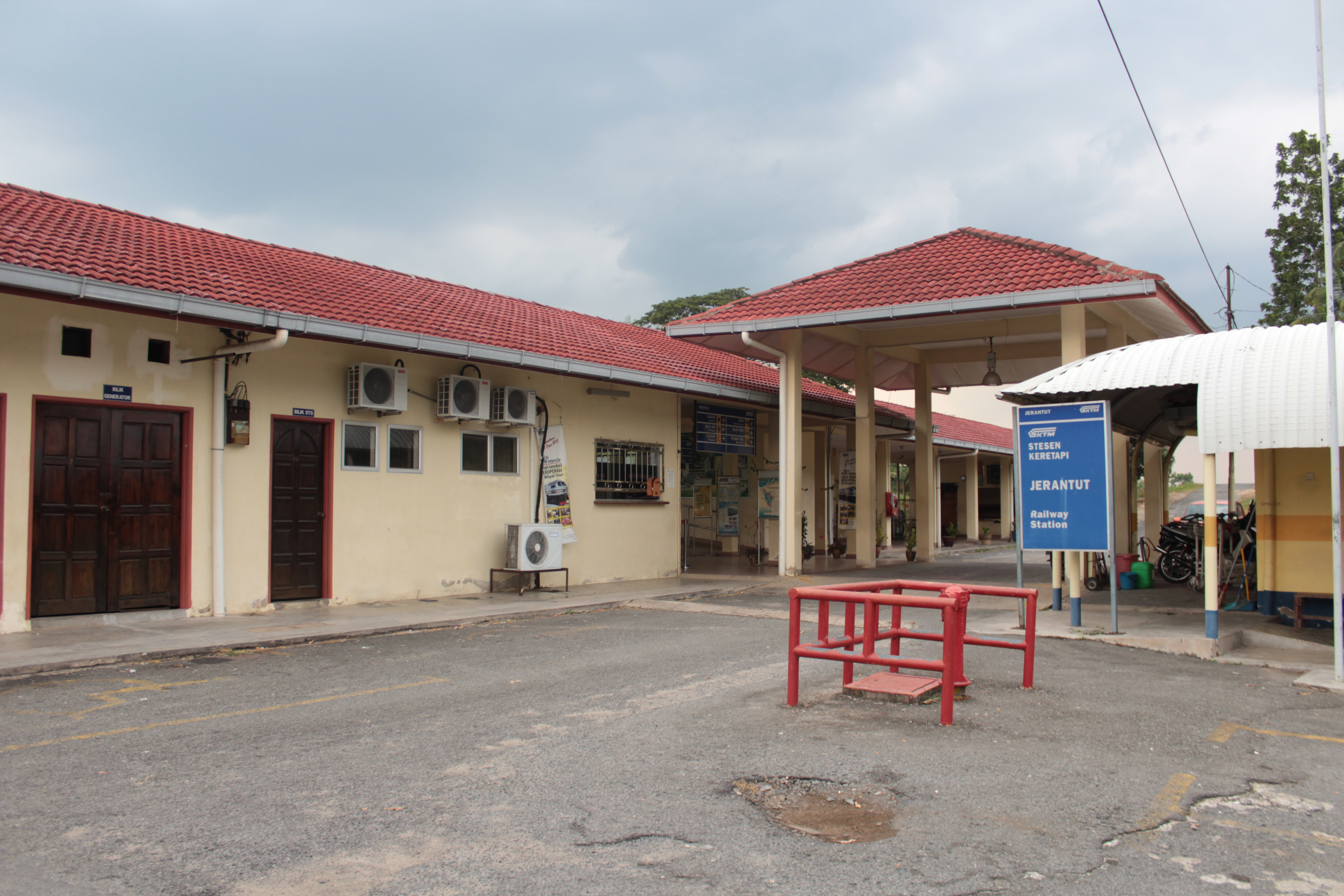

General information
- Other names: Malay: جرنتوت (Jawi); Chinese: 而连突; Tamil: ஜெராண்டுட்
- Location: Jerantut, Jerantut District; Pahang; Malaysia
- Owner: Railway Assets Corporation
- Operator: Keretapi Tanah Melayu
- Line: East Coast Line
- Platforms: 1 side platform
- Tracks: 3

Construction
- Structure type: At-grade
- Parking: Available, free.
- Accessible: Yes

Services
Preceding station	Keretapi Tanah Melayu (Intercity)	Following station
Kerambit towards Tumpat	Ekspres Rakyat Timuran	Kuala Krau towards Johor Bahru Sentral
Mela Halt towards Kuala Lipis	Shuttle Timur	Jenderak towards Gemas
Location

The Jerantut railway station, also known as 'Jungle Station', is a Malaysian train station located at and named after the town of Jerantut, Pahang.

The station is one of the major stations of Keretapi Tanah Melayu's (KTM) East Coast Line. KTM Intercity shuttle and express trains stop at this station.

== Train services ==
The station is served by the following KTM Intercity services:

- Ekspres Rakyat Timuran 26/27 Tumpat–JB Sentral
- Shuttle Timur 30/31/34/35/38/39 Gemas–Kuala Lipis

== Around the station ==
- National Park
- Kota Gelanggi Caves
- Lata Meraung Waterfall
- Orang Asli Settlement
