= Yawi =

Yawi may mean:

- Yawi language, a Malayan language of Southern Thailand
- Jawi script, an Arabic alphabet used for several languages of Southeast Asia

== See also ==
- Yaoi, a Japanese genre of fiction
