= Bangkok Malays =

Malay sub-ethnic in Bangkok

Malayu Bangkok/nayu bakoi

Regions with significant populations
- Bangkok Metropolitan Region; Central Thailand

Languages
- Central Thai (Predominantly); Bangkok Malay (Minority)

Religion
- Islam

Related ethnic groups
- Malay people (Patani Malays • Kedahan • Kelantanese • Terengganuan); Other Thai Muslim communities.

The Bangkok Malays (Thai: มลายูบางกอก, Jawi: ملايو بڠكوق, Bangkok Malay: Malayu Bangkok, Nayu bakoi, Malay: Melayu Bangkok) are a distinct Malay community with historical roots dating back to the late 18th and early 19th centuries. Their presence in the city traces back to Siam’s military campaigns, particularly against Patani, as well as Kedah, Kelantan, Terengganu, and other regions, which led to the forced relocation of thousands of Malays to Bangkok. Among them were members of the aristocracy, artisans and peasants who were resettled in various parts of the city.

Over time, the Bangkok Malays established settlements along the city's canal networks, engaging in agriculture, trade and construction. While many have assimilated into Thai society, they have preserved aspects of their cultural and religious heritage. Mosques and Islamic institutions remain central to the community, and traces of the Malay language are still present, particularly among the older generation, though its usage has declined over time.

In the 20th century, government-led assimilation policies and urbanization contributed to the gradual integration of the Bangkok Malays into mainstream Thai society. Today, most identify as Thai Muslims, though Islamic traditions and elements of Malay cultural identity remain evident in certain areas, particularly in Nonthaburi and Pathum Thani.

== History ==
=== Presence in the Ayutthaya Kingdom ===
Malay communities were present in the area that is now Bangkok as early as the Ayutthaya period, when the Ayutthaya Kingdom maintained diplomatic and trade relations with Malay sultanates. While some Malays settled in the region for commercial purposes, a distinct Malay community had yet to form. By the 17th century, Ayutthaya had a diverse Muslim population, including merchants from the Near East and South Asia, a Cham military contingent, and various Southeast Asian Muslim groups such as Javanese, Makassarese and Malays. Patani Malays were among those who supported King Narai’s rise to the throne in 1656.

During a visit to Ayutthaya in 1687–1688, French envoy Simon de La Loubère estimated that the city was home to "three to four thousand Moors and perhaps as many Malays." A designated Malay quarter was also marked on his map of Ayutthaya, indicating an established presence. However, it was not until the late 18th and early 19th centuries, following Siam’s military campaigns in Patani and Kedah, that a significant Malay community emerged in Bangkok.

=== Malay Deportations in the 18th and 19th Centuries ===
The displacement of Malay populations during the late 18th and early 19th centuries was driven by regional conflicts and shifting political dynamics. Following the fall of Ayutthaya to the Burmese in 1767, the Patani Sultanate briefly regained independence. However, after the establishment of Bangkok as the new Siamese capital, the Burmese launched a large-scale invasion in 1785, attacking from multiple fronts, including the southern regions. In response, the Siamese forces subdued Patani, capturing its ruler, nobility and thousands of inhabitants, who were subsequently deported to Bangkok. Many of these captives were resettled in areas such as Min Buri and Nong Chok, which continue to host significant Muslim communities.

Following the initial conquest, further deportations occurred as Siam sought to consolidate its rule over Patani. Members of the Patani royal family and nobility were relocated to Bang Khaek, while commoners were settled in various locations, including Tok Road, Pratu Nam, Paklat, Phetchaburi, Chachoengsao, Nakhon Nayok and Pathum Thani. Some groups later migrated eastward toward Chonburi. These forced relocations not only served Siam’s strategic interests in controlling the Malay population but also contributed to the demographic and cultural landscape of central Thailand.

Successive waves of deportations followed a series of uprisings against Siamese rule. In 1791 and 1795, Patani rebellions were suppressed, resulting in another forced relocation of captives to central Siam. In 1821, the refusal of the Sultan of Kedah to comply with a summons to Bangkok led to a Siamese invasion and the subsequent annexation of Kedah. A decade later, an insurrection originating in Kedah spread to Patani, Kelantan and Terengganu but was decisively suppressed by 1832, leading to the deportation of an estimated 4,000 to 5,000 individuals to Bangkok. The last significant uprising of the 19th century occurred in Kedah in 1839, after which further deportations of Malay Muslims took place.

As a result of these forced relocations, Malay communities became firmly established across various parts of Thailand. Settlements of Malay captives were recorded in Thung Khru (Samut Prakan), Bang Kholaem, Phra Khanong, Khlong Tan, Min Buri, Nong Chok, Ayutthaya and Nonthaburi, as well as in Surat Thani and Nakhon Si Thammarat in the south.

Settlement patterns among Malay captives were largely determined by their places of origin. Those from Patani were primarily relocated to Hua Mak, Bang Kapi, Nong Chok and Min Buri, while captives from Kedah were placed in Khlong Sam Wa, Saphan Sung and Khlong Saen Saep. The dispersal of Patani and Kedah captives to opposite ends of Bangkok’s outskirts was likely a strategic measure to prevent communication and collaboration that could lead to organized rebellions.

Additionally, other Malays from Kedah, Perlis, Kelantan and Penang were initially settled in Thanon Tok before being relocated to Khlong Saen Saep near Sai Kong Din in Min Buri. Over time, some groups moved further east to newly established settlements along Khlong 17, 20, 21, and 22, while others migrated to Tha-It and later to Bang Bua Thong.

=== The Role of Malays in 19th-Century Central Siam ===
The forced relocation of Malay populations following Siam’s annexation of Patani and other Malay states in the late 18th and early 19th centuries significantly shaped the demographic landscape of central Thailand. Thousands of Malay captives, known as chaloei, a term of Khmer origin referring to individuals taken in war, were transported to Bangkok and its surrounding areas. Although their social status was subordinate to that of free citizens, they ranked above ordinary slaves (phrae), as they were permitted to own land and could eventually regain their freedom.

Upon arrival, the captives were resettled primarily along canal (khlong) networks, which provided access to transportation and arable land for cultivation. Many were also conscripted into labor projects, particularly for the construction and expansion of Bangkok, which had become the new Siamese capital following the destruction of Ayutthaya. Some were assigned to large-scale infrastructure projects, including the construction of the Saen Saep Canal in the 1830s, while others were settled as rice farmers in rural areas surrounding the capital.

Historical records from the early 19th century document the presence of Malay settlements across central Thailand. Ban Chong, near Ayutthaya, was identified as a Malay settlement, its residents distinguishable by their language and physical features. Other Malay communities were recorded north of Ang Thong, as well as in Sam Khok (Pathum Thani), Paklat (modern-day Phra Pradaeng, Samut Prakan) and Pak Kret (Nonthaburi), where the original Malay settlement of Tha It was founded. These settlements were often located near Mon communities, though the reasons for this pattern of relocation remain unclear.

The resettlement of Malay captives played a crucial role in developing the outskirts of Bangkok, which was sparsely populated at the time. To boost agricultural production and strengthen the kingdom’s defenses, the Siamese administration strategically relocated them to key areas. In 1837, King Rama III commissioned the construction of the Saen Saep Canal, employing Malay war captives alongside Chinese laborers. These captives were responsible for dredging the canal, reforesting the surrounding areas and reclaiming land along its banks. Their labor not only expanded Siam’s irrigation and transportation networks but also reinforced Siamese control over newly annexed territories, contributing to the kingdom’s economic and strategic growth.

As these captives and their descendants established permanent communities, they were granted land for cultivation by Siamese authorities. Due to the vital role of canals in transportation and agriculture, Malay Muslims primarily settled along khlongs, where they engaged in farming and trade. Over time, these settlements grew into self-sustaining rural communities, laying the foundation for today’s Malay population in central Thailand.

Despite their displacement, Malay captives managed to preserve their linguistic and cultural heritage. Early 19th-century European travelers recorded the continued use of the Malay language in several areas of central Thailand. By 1881, British scholar Maxwell noted that “Siam proper has a large Malay population, descendants mainly of captives taken in war, and the language is therefore in use there in places.” These observations underscore the resilience of Malay identity, which has persisted across generations despite assimilation pressures.

=== Nationalism and Language Assimilation in Central Thailand’s Malay Villages ===
Two key events significantly influenced language use among the Malay communities in central Thailand. The first was the expansion of rural government schools in the 1930s. Although elementary education had been made compulsory in 1921, its implementation outside Bangkok remained limited until after the 1932 revolution. Prior to this, Malay villagers in central Thailand had minimal contact with Thai speakers and were largely monolingual in Malay. With Thai being the sole language of instruction in government schools, Malay children were required to learn it. According to oral accounts from older villagers, in the early years of compulsory education, children of all ages attended classes together, leading to rapid bilingualism among the younger generation. Over time, the standard practice of enrolling children at the age of six was established.

The second major factor was the nationalist policies introduced by Prime Minister Luang Phibunsongkhram, commonly known as Phibun, following the 1938 general elections. A military officer with authoritarian leanings, Phibun promoted a nationalist agenda that drew inspiration from leaders such as Mussolini and Hitler. Upon assuming office, he launched a policy known as ratthaniyom (รัฐนิยม), often translated as "nationalism" but more accurately meaning "state ideology." This initiative aimed to assimilate minority groups, including Malays, into mainstream Thai society, further encouraging the adoption of the Thai language.

The impact of ratthaniyom on the Malay language was profound. The prohibition of Malay in public spaces led to its decline, particularly among those who studied or worked outside their communities. The aggressive promotion of Thai as the sole national language further reinforced this shift. Many Malay parents saw early fluency in Thai as a means for their children to secure better opportunities and avoid social and economic hardships.

Several factors contributed to this linguistic transition. In 1940, the Thai government officially banned the use of Malay and other non-Tai minority languages in public, accelerating the process of assimilation. By this time, the younger generation of Malays in central Thailand had already become bilingual, largely due to the introduction of compulsory Thai-language education. Additionally, wartime hardships led to the decline of oral literary traditions within the Malay community, further reducing the role of Malay in everyday life and altering speakers' attitudes toward their native language.

=== From Rural Settlements to Urban Integration ===
These shifts in language and identity set the stage for broader social and economic transformations in the decades that followed. As Malay communities in central Thailand became increasingly bilingual and integrated into Thai society, their traditional way of life also began to change.

The effects of this assimilation became even more pronounced with the rapid urbanization of Bangkok and its surrounding areas in the late 20th century. Formerly agricultural settlements, where Malay was once widely spoken, were gradually transformed into modern neighborhoods with factories, housing estates and commercial centers. Infrastructure improvements, such as highways and roads replacing traditional waterways, further connected these communities to the expanding metropolis.

As younger generations entered new industries and adopted mainstream Thai economic and social structures, their connection to Malay cultural traditions weakened. While Islam remained a central part of their identity, the use of the Malay language declined, especially in urban areas where Thai became dominant. These changes led to growing concerns among older community members about the erosion of their heritage and the challenges of preserving their distinct cultural identity in an increasingly urban and Thai-speaking environment.

The expansion of urban development, land conversion and commercial investments has reshaped Malay village communities in Bangkok for over two centuries. Traditional Malay settlements along Khlong Saen Saep, including Bo Bae Market, Pratu Nam and Ramkhamhaeng (formerly known as Khlong Tan or Khlong Kelantan), have been absorbed into the city's expanding metropolitan landscape, accelerating cultural assimilation.

Despite these transformations, remnants of early Malay settlements can still be found across Bangkok. The descendants of the original settlers continue to reside in areas ranging from Khlong Bang Lamphu, within the old royal palace compound, to communities extending 74 kilometers eastward toward the Bang Pakong River. Many of these areas retain mosques, Islamic schools and Muslim cemeteries, serving as lasting symbols of the community’s historical presence and cultural identity.

However, as Bangkok has continued to urbanize, Malay communities have become more integrated into Thai society. Today, most Bangkok Malays identify as Thai Muslims, with Islam remaining a central part of their identity. While the use of the Malay language has declined, particularly in urban areas where Thai is more commonly spoken, elements of Malay cultural traditions are still present in religious and communal settings. The language continues to be spoken among older generations in areas such as Bang Bua Thong (Nonthaburi) and the villages of Khlong Bang Pho and Khlong Neng (Pathum Thani).

== Culture and Identity ==
=== Language ===
The Bangkok Malay dialect developed from interactions among Malay-speaking communities, primarily from Patani. While it is primarily rooted in Patani Malay, it has been more strongly influenced by the Thai language compared to Patani Malay. Both dialects, however, share the characteristic of lacking direct loanwords from English, distinguishing them from other Malay varieties in the region. It is estimated that around 5,000 people still speak the Bangkok Malay dialect today.

Historically, Malay was widely spoken among the Bangkok Malay community, particularly in rural areas and within close-knit communities. However, the promotion of Thai as the national language through government policies has led to a steady decline in its usage. Today, younger generations primarily communicate in Thai, especially in formal settings such as education and employment, while Malay remains more commonly spoken among the older population. This shift has raised concerns regarding the preservation of the language within the community.

The extent of Malay usage varies across different Bangkok Malay communities. In Khlong Bang Po, Malay remains actively spoken and is used for khutbah (Friday sermons). In contrast, in areas such as Khlong Neng, Bang Bua Thong and Tha-It, the language is spoken to a lesser degree, mainly by older individuals. The Malay dialect spoken in Bang Bua Thong and Tha-It differs significantly from that of other Bangkok Malay communities, with linguistic influences traced to a village in Yala near the Kedah border. Research has noted that this dialect closely resembles the variety spoken in Padang Terap, Kedah.

=== Writing System ===
The Jawi script, a modified Arabic script used for writing Malay, was historically an important aspect of Bangkok Malay identity, particularly in religious and scholarly contexts. Following the forced resettlement of Malay populations in Bangkok over 200 years ago, Jawi continued to be used, primarily for Islamic education and communication among religious scholars. Texts on Islamic teachings and historical records were often written in Jawi, ensuring that religious knowledge was preserved within the community.

In recent decades, however, the use of Jawi has declined significantly. The Thai government's policy of compulsory education in the Thai language, coupled with increased access to religious teachings in Arabic, has contributed to this decline. Unlike in Malaysia, where the Jawi script has been standardized and adapted to align with Romanized Malay spelling, the Jawi used by Bangkok Malays has remained close to its original Arabic spelling conventions. Today, Jawi is largely limited to religious contexts, with most Bangkok Malays using Thai for daily communication and formal writing.

== See also ==
- Patani Malays
- Thai Malays
- Kedahan Malays
- History of Bangkok
