= Bangkok Malay =

Malay dialect in Thailand

- Nonthaburi Malay
- Melayu Bangkok; Nayu Bakok ภาษามลายูบางกอก ملايو بڠكوق
- Native to: Thailand
- Region: Bangkok
- Ethnicity: Bangkok Malays
- Native speakers: c. 5,000 (2007)
- Language family: Austronesian: Malayo-Polynesian; Malayic; Kelantan–Pattani; Pattani–Nonthaburi; Bangkok Malay
- Writing system: Jawi script, Thai script

Language codes
- ISO 639-3: –
- Glottolog: nont1234

Bangkok Malay, also referred to as Nonthaburi Malay, is a local variant of Malay spoken by the Bangkok Malays, an ethnic Malay community in Bangkok and its surrounding areas. It emerged from the interaction of the Malay community from Southern Thailand, as well as northern and eastern Peninsular Malaysia, gradually evolving into a distinct variety of Malay. Despite historical Malay presence in what is now Bangkok dated as early as the Ayutthaya era, the dialect nonetheless only began to develop after the settlement of deportees from Kedah, Perlis, Kelantan, Patani, Satun, Terengganu, and Yaring in 1786, 1791, and 1832.

The speakers of Bangkok Malay can be found throughout the city, with higher concentrations in Malay enclaves in Thon Buri, Thung Khru, Phra Pradaeng, Bang Kho Laem, Phra Khanong, Khlong Saen Saep, Min Buri, Nong Chok, Bang Nam Priao, Chachoengsao, Thon Buri, and Pom Prap Sattru Phai.

There are several variations of Bangkok Malay, owing to the various waves and origins of Malay settlements in the city. The dialect is largely based on Patani Malay, with visible divergence from the original spoken in the south. This allows Bangkok Malay to be constituted as a separate dialect from Pattani Malay. Another notable sub-dialect of Bangkok Malay spoken in the Bang Kraso, Bang Bua Thong and Tha It districts demonstrate a strong Kedah Malay influence, which correlates to the fact that most Malay people from these areas descend from deportees brought from Kedah in the 18th century.

Following the rise of urbanism and assimilation with the larger Thai majority, the language is now highly confined to adults over the age of 40, with varied fluency among younger generations.

== See also ==
- Bangkok Malays
- Thai Malays
- Kelantan-Patani Malay
- Kedah Malay
- Malayic languages

== Bibliography ==
- Umaiyah Haji Umar (2003), The assimilation of Bangkok-Melayu communities in the Bangkok metropolis and surrounding areas, Ann Arbor: the University of Michigan, online edition
- Umaiyah Haji Umar (2007), Language and Writing System of Bangkok Melayu, International Conference on Minority Languages and Writing Systems, online edition
- Umaiyah Haji Umar (2005). "Bang Bua Thong Dialect – A Lexicon Study". Journal of Language and Culture. 24 (2): 5–22.
- Siti Munirah binti Kassim (2014), Sosio Budaya dan Identiti Etnik Melayu di Thailand, Kuala Lumpur:Jabatan Pengajian Asia Tenggara, Universiti Malaya, online edition (in Malay)
