= Phra Wachirayan =

Phra Wachirayan (Thai: พระวชิรญาณ), also known as Phra Atichot Dhammavaro (อติโชติ ธมฺมวโร) or Luang Pho Atichot (หลวงพ่ออติโชติ), was a Thai Buddhist monk who served as abbot of Wat Phutthaisawan in Ayutthaya, Thailand. He was appointed a Phra Ratchakhana of ordinary rank in the Vipassana division in 2024.

== Biography ==
Atichot was born on 21 November 1959. He was ordained as a Buddhist monk on 22 January 1997 at Wat Phutthaisawan in Ayutthaya. He passed the highest level of the Dhamma Scholar examination (นักธรรมชั้นเอก).

In 2016, he was appointed assistant abbot of Wat Phutthaisawan. He became acting abbot in 2021 and abbot in 2022.

In 2019, he received the ecclesiastical title Phra Khru Phawanaphattharakun (พระครูภาวนาภัทรคุณ), an assistant-abbot rank in the Vipassana division. On 28 June 2024, he was appointed a Phra Ratchakhana of ordinary rank in the Vipassana division, with the title Phra Wachirayan.

== Amulets ==
Atichot was involved in the production of Buddhist amulets at Wat Phutthaisawan. He was credited with creating the Nuea Duang (เหรียญเหนือดวง), also known as the Yok Thana (เหรียญยกฐานะ) amulet. The amulet was produced in 2006 as a souvenir for celebrations following Wat Phutthaisawan's elevation to royal-monastery status. It underwent two consecration ceremonies at the temple in August 2006, with Atichot taking part in the ceremonies.

In October 2023, Anutin Charnvirakul, then deputy prime minister and minister of the interior, showed a gold Nuea Duang amulet from Wat Phutthaisawan to reporters while discussing Thai soft power. He described the adjustable paracord necklace on which he wore it as a form of Thai folk craftsmanship.

== Arrest and disrobing ==
On 10 September 2026, officers from the Central Investigation Bureau arrested Atichot at Wat Phutthaisawan under a warrant issued by the Criminal Court for Corruption and Misconduct Cases, Region 1. The warrant concerned allegations of misappropriating temple funds, abuse of official authority, and money laundering. Investigators said that more than 92 million baht had been diverted from the temple and transferred to a woman identified in reports as Punyavee Rungreung (ปุณยวีร์ รุ่งเรือง), a close female worship of Atichot.

The investigation began after a complaint was filed in July 2026 alleging that Atichot had an inappropriate relationship with Punyavee and that she had acquired assets despite having no regular occupation. Investigators later examined the temple's finances and alleged that Atichot had received donations and payments for Buddhist amulets in the name of the temple without depositing the money into the temple's accounts. Police said the investigation found more than 92 million baht in financial damage.

Punyavee was also arrested under a separate warrant. Police searched her home in Pathum Thani and reported finding 3.5 million baht in cash, approximately 90 baht-weight of gold, Buddhist amulets, land documents and bank-account records. Police said the seized property was being examined as part of the investigation into the alleged movement of temple funds.

The investigation also concerned the relationship between Atichot and Punyavee. On the same day, Atichot was taken to the deputy ecclesiastical governor of Ayutthaya Province and left the monkhood in a ceremony that lasted about 30 minutes. He was subsequently taken to the Central Investigation Bureau for further questioning.
