= Kuala Tahan =

Coordinates: 4°23′N 102°24′E

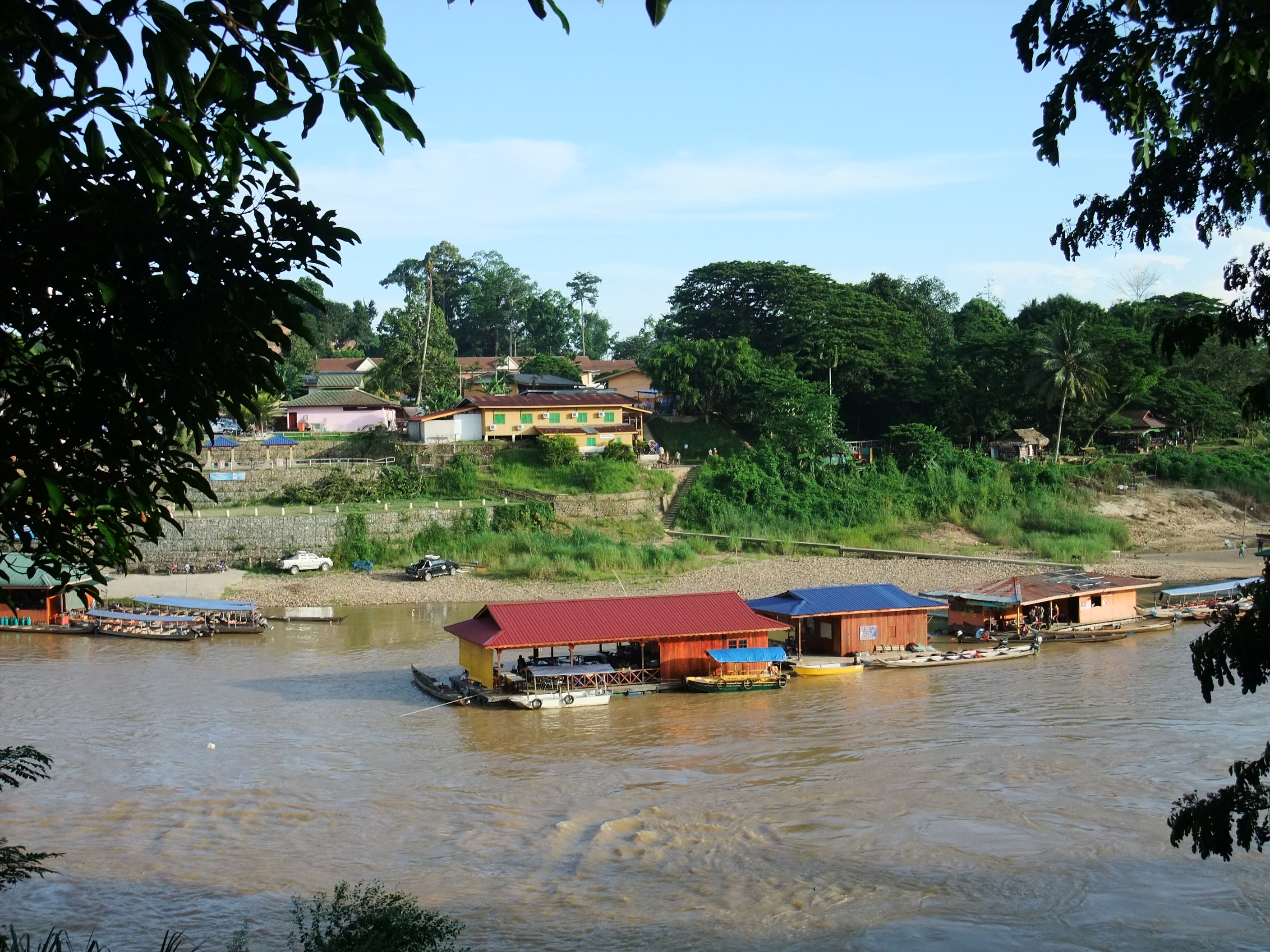
Kuala Tahan from the Taman Negara National Park.

Kuala Tahan is a Malaysian village located at the confluence of the Tahan and Tembiling Rivers, in Jerantut District, Pahang.

== Etymology ==
The word Kuala means "confluence" in Malay (refer Kuala Lumpur), and the Tahan River is a tributary of the Tembeling river.

== Tourism ==
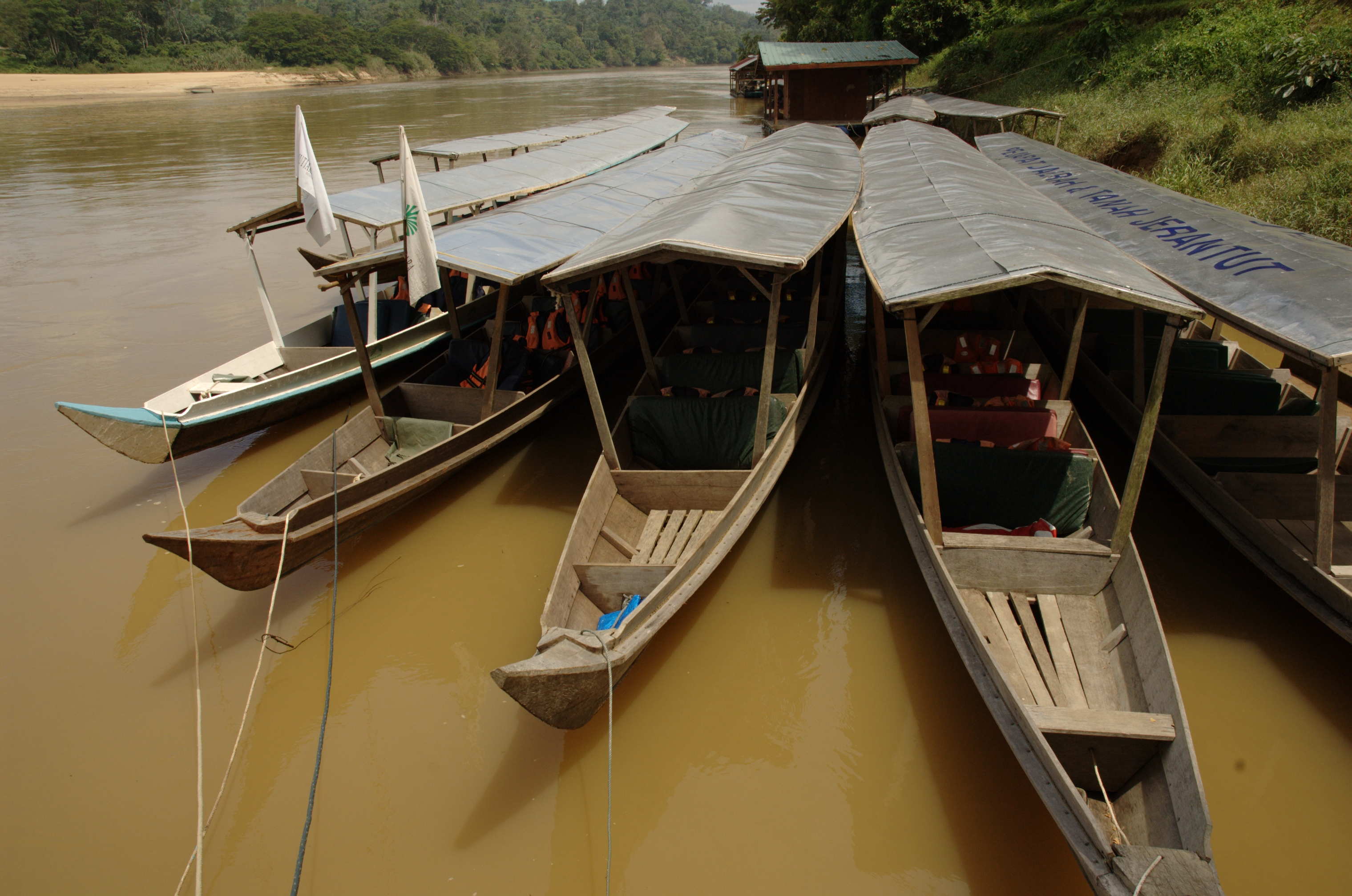
Boats in Kuala Tahan

Resorts at Kuala Tahan receive visitors to Taman Negara National Park. Other facilities include floating restaurants and campsites.

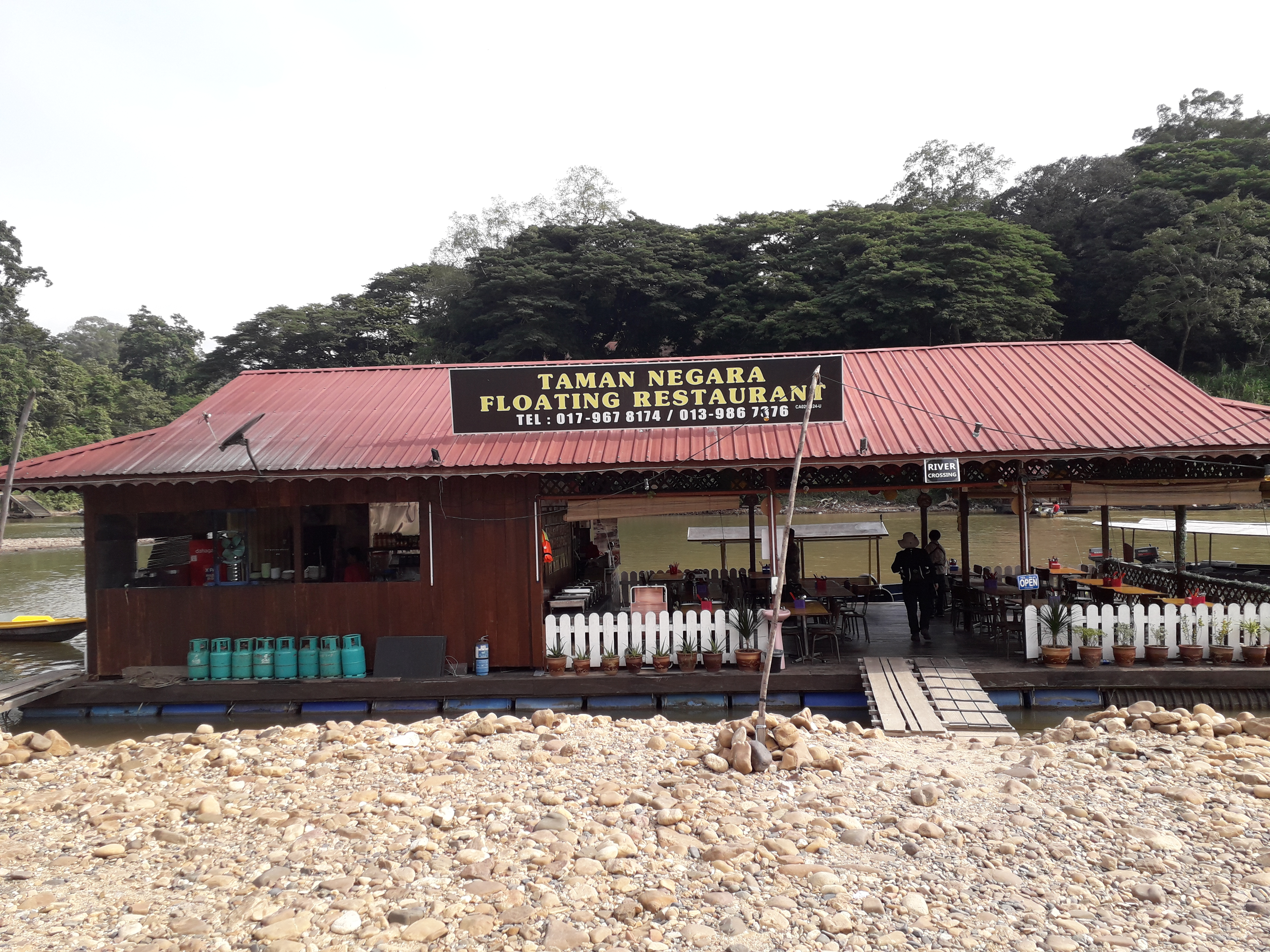
A floating restaurant at the shore

There are several accommodation options in Kuala Tahan which serve as Taman Negara's base camps. The Mutiara Taman Negara Resort is the only resort within Taman Negara National Park, located across the Tembeling river from Kuala Tahan town proper. Others within Kuala Tahan village area include Persona Resort, Rainforest Resort, Woodland Resort, Park Lodge (a bit far from the Taman Negara entrance), Durian Chalet, Teresek View Village, Liana Hostel, Agoh Chalet and Travelers Home.

== Transportation ==
Kuala Tahan is accessible by slowboat from Kuala Tembeling, or route 1508 (Jalan Felda Padang Piol) via a local bus from Jerantut, a share taxi, or by car.
