= Ayodhya (disambiguation) =

Ayodhya is a city located in Ayodhya District of Uttar Pradesh, India.

Ayodhya may refer to:

- Ayodhya (Ramayana), a legendary city mentioned in the Ramayana and other ancient Sanskrit-language texts, generally identified with the city in Uttar Pradesh.
- Ayodhya district, a district in Uttar Pradesh, India, centred on the city
  - Ayodhya division, a division of Uttar Pradesh, containing the district
  - Ayodhya (Assembly constituency)
- Ayodhya (2005 Tamil film), an Indian Tamil-language drama film
- Ayodhya (2005 Telugu film), an Indian Telugu-language film
- Ayodhya (1975 film), an Indian Malayalam-language film
- Ayodhya Kand, a book of the Ramayana
- Ayodhya (opera), a 2006 opera by Somtow Sucharitkul
- Ayutthaya Kingdom, classical Thai Kingdom
- Phra Nakhon Si Ayutthaya (city), locally and simply Ayutthaya is a city in Thailand
- Ayutthaya United F.C., football club in Thailand
- Bang Pa-in Ayutthaya F.C., football club in Thailand

== See also ==
- Ayutthaya (disambiguation)
