= Padang Tengku railway station =

Railway station in Malaysia

Padang Tengku

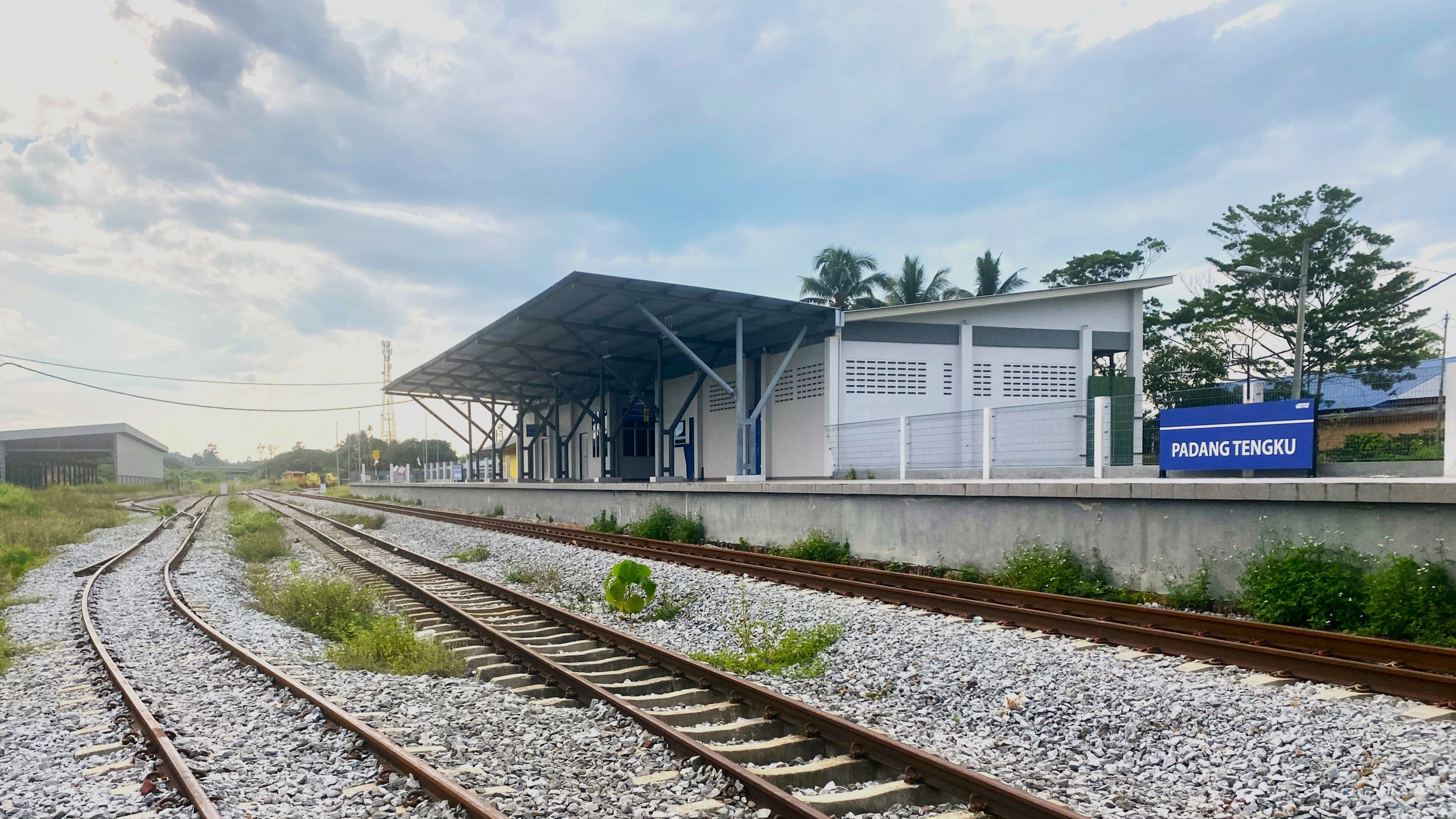
- Padang Tengku Railway Station

General information
- Other names: Malay: ڤادڠ تڠکو (Jawi); Chinese: 巴登东姑; Tamil: பாடாங் தெங்கு
- Location: Padang Tengku; Pahang; Malaysia
- Coordinates: 4.23372°N 101.98883°E
- System: KTM Intercity
- Owner: Railway Assets Corporation
- Operator: Keretapi Tanah Melayu
- Line: East Coast Line
- Platforms: 1 side platform
- Tracks: 3

Construction
- Structure type: At-grade
- Platform levels: 2
- Parking: Available, free.
- Accessible: Yes

Services
Preceding station	Keretapi Tanah Melayu (Intercity)	Following station
Bukit Betong Halt towards Tumpat	Shuttle Timur	Kuala Lipis Terminus
Bukit Betong Halt towards Gua Musang	Shuttle Timur	Kuala Lipis Terminus
Location

The Padang Tengku railway station is a Malaysian train station located at and named after the town of Padang Tengku in the Lipis District of the state of Pahang.

== Train services ==
The station is served by the following KTM Intercity services:

- Shuttle Timur 51/60 Tumpat-Kuala Lipis
- Shuttle Timur 50/59 Gua Musang-Kuala Lipis
