= Southern Thai language =

Southwestern Tai language

Southern Thai
- ภาษาไทยถิ่นใต้
- Pronunciation: /pʰaː.sǎː tʰaj tʰìn tâːj/
- Native to: Southern Thailand, Kedah, Kelantan and Tanintharyi Region
- Ethnicity: Southern Thai; Peranakans; Malaysian Siamese; Thai Malays
- Native speakers: 4.5 million (2006)
- Language family: Kra–Dai: Tai; Southwestern Tai; Chiang Saen; Sukhothai; Southern Thai
- Writing system: Thai script Thai Braille

Official status
- Recognised minority language in: Thailand
- Regulated by: None

Language codes
- ISO 639-3: sou
- Glottolog: sout2746
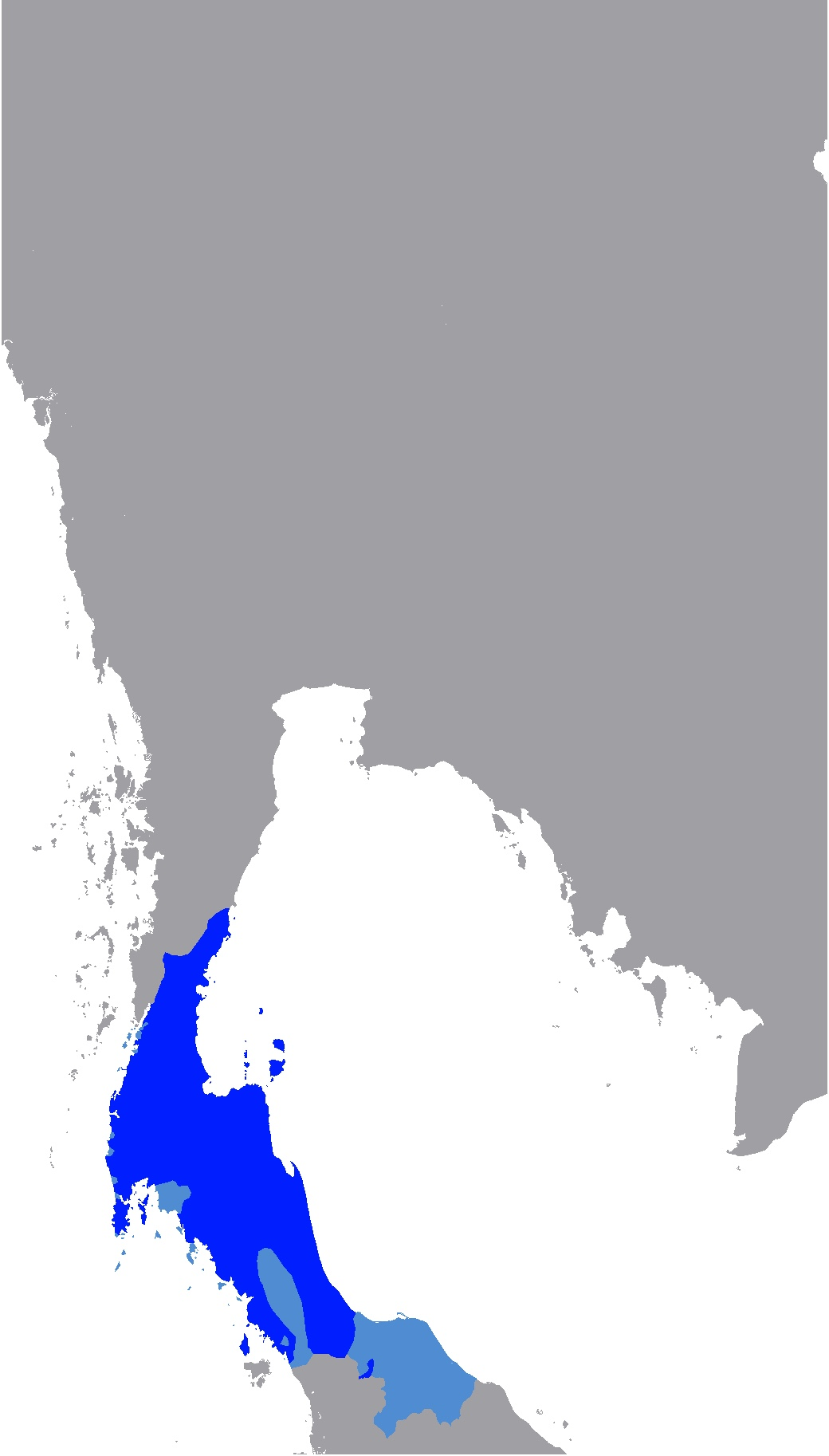

Southern Thai (ภาษาไทยถิ่นใต้ [pʰaːsǎː tʰaj tʰìn tâːj]), also known as Dambro (ภาษาตามโพร [pʰaːsǎː taːm pʰroː]), Pak Tai (ภาษาปักษ์ใต้ [pʰaːsǎː pàk tâːj]), or "Southern language" (ภาษาใต้ [pʰaːsǎː tâːj]), is a Southwestern Tai ethnolinguistic identity and language spoken in southern Thailand, as well as by small communities in the northernmost states of Malaysia. It is spoken by roughly five million people and as a second language by the 1.5 million speakers of Pattani and other ethnic groups such as the local Peranakan communities, Negritos and other tribal groups. Most speakers are also fluent in or understand the Central Thai dialects.

== Classification ==
Southern Thai is classified as one of the Chiang Saen languages, the others being Thai, Northern Thai and numerous smaller languages. They, together with the Northwestern Tai and the Lao-Phutai languages, form the Southwestern branch of the Tai languages. The Tai languages are a branch of the Kra–Dai language family, which encompasses a large number of indigenous languages that are spoken in an arc from Hainan and Guangxi south through Laos and northern Vietnam to the Cambodia border.

- Kra-Dai
  - Hlai languages
  - Kam-Sui languages
  - Kra languages
  - Be language
  - Tai languages
    - Northern Tai languages
    - Central Tai languages
    - Southwestern Tai languages
      - Northwestern Tai languages
        - Khamti language
        - Tai Lue language
        - Shan language
        - others
      - Chiang Saen languages
        - Northern Thai language
        - Sukhothai language
          - Thai language
          - Southern Thai language
      - Lao-Phuthai languages
        - Phuthai language
        - Lao language (Isan language)

== Dialects ==
Phonyarit (2018) recognizes the following nine main dialects of Southern Thai, based on tone split and merger patterns.

=== Southern Thai (Eastern) ===
- Nakhonsithammarat dialect (Standard), spoken in the upper part of Nakhon Si Thammarat Province and eastern part of Surat Thani Province
- Thungsong dialect, spoken in the lower part of Nakhon Si Thammarat Province and surrounding provinces such as Phatthalung
- Songkhla dialect, spoken in Songkhla and surrounding provinces, except in Hat Yai district, where Krungthep dialect with southern loanwords is spoken
- Syburi dialect, spoken in Syburi (Kedah), Palis and Satun Province

=== Southern Thai (Western) ===
- Chaiya dialect, spoken in the most part of Surat Thani Province and Ranong Province, classified as a dialect of the Peranakans except in Bandon district, where the Krungthep dialect is spoken with southern loanwords.
- Chumphon dialect, spoken in Chumphon Province and the southern part of Prachuap Khiri Khan Provinces
- Phuket dialect, spoken by Peranakans in Phuket Province, Krabi Province, Trang Province and Phang Nga Provinces
- Samui dialect, spoken in Samui District and Pha-ngan District

=== Takbai dialect ===
- Takbai dialect, spoken by the Siamese minority in Pattani

== Distribution ==
In Thailand, speakers of Southern Thai can be found in a contiguous region beginning as far north as southern part of Prachuap Khiri Khan Province and extending southward to the border with Malaysia. Smaller numbers of speakers reside in the Malaysian border states, especially Kedah, Kelantan, Penang, Perlis, and Perak. In those areas, it is the primary language of ethnic Thais and of the ethnically Malay people on both sides of the Thai-Malaysian border in Satun and Songkhla provinces.

Although numerous regional variations exist, and there is no standard, the language is most distinct near the Malaysian border. All varieties, however, remain mutually intelligible. For economic reasons, many speakers of Southern Thai have migrated to Bangkok and other Thai cities. Some have also emigrated to Malaysia, which offers economic opportunity but also a culture that shares Islam, which is practiced by some speakers of Southern Thai.

== History ==
Malay kingdoms ruled much of the Malay Peninsula, such as the Pattani Kingdom and Tambralinga, but most of the area, at one time or another, was under the rule of Srivijaya. The population of the Malay Peninsula was heavily influenced by the culture of India that was transmitted through missionaries or indirectly through traders. Numerous Buddhist and Hindu shrines attest to the diffusion of Indian culture. The power vacuum left by the collapse of Srivijaya was filled by the growth of the Nakhon Si Thammarat Kingdom, which subsequently became a vassal of the Sukhothai Kingdom. The area has been a frontier between the northern Tai peoples and the southern ethnic Malays as well as between Buddhism and Islam.

== Phonology ==
=== Tones ===
The majority of speakers using Southern Thai varieties display five phonemic tones (tonemes) in citation monosyllables although effects of sandhi can result in a substantially higher number of tonal allophones. This is true for dialects north of approximately 10° N and south of 7° N latitude, as well as urban sociolects throughout Southern Thailand. In between, there are dialects with six- and seven-tone systems. The dialect of Nakhon Si Thammarat Province (approximately centered on 8° N latitude), for example, has seven phonemic tones.

==== Initials ====
		Labial	Dental/ Alveolar	(Alveolo-) Palatal	Velar	Glottal
Nasal		/m/ ม	/n/ ณ, น	/ɲ/ ญ (Note: In some dialects.)		
Plosive/ Affricate	tenuis	/p/ ป	/t/ ฏ, ต	/tɕ/ จ	/k/ ก	/ʔ/ อ (Note: Implied before any vowel without an initial and after a short vowel without a final.)
Plosive/ Affricate	aspirate	/pʰ/ ผ, พ, ภ	/tʰ/ ฐ, ฑ, ฒ, ถ, ท, ธ	/tɕʰ/ ฉ, ช, ฌ	/kʰ/ ข, ฃ, ค, ฅ, ฆ (Note: ฃ and ฅ are no longer used. Thus, modern Thai is said to have 42 consonant letters.)	
Plosive/ Affricate	voiced	/b/ บ	/d/ ฎ, ด			
Fricative		/f/ ฝ, ฟ	/s/ ซ, ศ, ษ, ส			/h/ ง, ห, ฮ
Approximant		/w/ ว	/l/ ล, ฬ	/j/ ญ, ย		
Rhotic/Liquid			/r/ ร			

==== Clusters ====
In Southern Thai, each syllable in a word is considered separate from the others and so combinations of consonants from adjacent syllables are never recognised as clusters. Southern Thai has phonotactical constraints that define the permissible syllable structure, consonant clusters and vowel sequences. The original Thai vocabulary introduces only 11 combined consonantal patterns:

- /kr/ (กร), /kl/ (กล), /kw/ (กว)
- /kʰr/ (ขร, คร), /kʰl/ (ขล, คล), /kʰw/ (ขว, คว)
- /pr/ (ปร), /pl/ (ปล)
- /pʰr/ (พร), /pʰl/ (ผล, พล)
- /tr/ (ตร)

==== Finals ====
All plosive sounds (besides the glottal stop /ʔ/) are unreleased. Hence, final /p/, /t/, and /k/ sounds are pronounced as [p̚], [t̚], and [k̚] respectively. Of the consonant letters, excluding the disused ฃ and ฅ, six (ฉ ผ ฝ ห อ ฮ) cannot be used as a final, and the other 36 are grouped as follows:

	Labial	Alveolar	Palatal	Velar	Glottal
Nasal	/m/ ม	/n/ ญ, ณ, น, ร, ล, ฬ		/ŋ/ ง	
Plosive	/p/ บ, ป, พ, ฟ, ภ	/t/ จ, ช, ซ, ฌ, ฎ, ฏ, ฐ, ฑ, ฒ ,ด, ต, ถ, ท, ธ, ศ, ษ, ส		/k/ ก, ข, ค, ฆ	/ʔ/ (Note: The glottal stop appears at the end when no final follows a short vowel.)
Approximant	/w/ ว		/j/ ย		

=== Vowels ===
The vowels of Southern Thai are similar to those of Central Thai and, from front to back and close to open, are given in the following table. The top entry in every cell is the symbol from the International Phonetic Alphabet, the second entry gives the spelling in the Thai alphabet, where a dash (–) indicates the position of the initial consonant after which the vowel is pronounced. A second dash indicates that a final consonant must follow.

	Front		Central		Back	
	short	long	short	long	short	long
Close	/i/ -ิ	/iː/ -ี	/ɯ/ -ึ	/ɯː/ -ื-	/u/ -ุ	/uː/ -ู
Mid	/e/ เ-ะ	/eː/ เ-	/ɤ/ เ-อะ	/ɤː/ เ-อ	/o/ โ-ะ	/oː/ โ-
Open	/ɛ/ แ-ะ	/ɛː/ แ-	/a/ -ะ, -ั-	/aː/ -า	/ɔ/ เ-าะ	/ɔː/ -อ

The vowels each exist in long-short pairs: these are distinct phonemes forming unrelated words in Southern Thai, but usually transliterated the same: เขา /khaw/ means "he/she", while ขาว /khaːw/ means "white".

The long-short pairs are as follows:

Long					Short				
Thai	IPA	Example			Thai	IPA	Example		
–า	/aː/	ฝาน	/faːn/	'to slice'	–ะ	/a/	ฝัน	/fan/	'to dream'
–ี	/iː/				–ิ	/i/			
–ู	/uː/				–ุ	/u/	หนุน	/nun/	'jackfruit'
เ–	/eː/	เล	/leː/	'sea'	เ–ะ	/e/			
แ–	/ɛː/	แขบ	/kʰɛːp/	'hurry'	แ–ะ	/ɛ/	แหยะ	/jɛʔ/	'leftover'
–ื-	/ɯː/	คืน	/kʰɯːn/	'to return'	–ึ	/ɯ/			
เ–อ	/ɤː/				เ–อะ	/ɤ/	เงิน	/hɤn/	'money'
โ–	/oː/	โหนด	/noːt/	'palmyra palm'	โ–ะ	/o/	จก	/tɕok/	'mirror, glass'
–อ	/ɔː/				เ–าะ	/ɔ/			

The basic vowels can be combined into diphthongs. For purposes of determining tone, those marked with an asterisk are sometimes classified as long:

Long		Short	
Thai script	IPA	Thai script	IPA
–าย	/aːj/	ไ–^{*}, ใ–^{*}, ไ–ย, -ัย	/aj/
–าว	/aːw/	เ–า^{*}	/aw/
เ–ีย	/ia/	เ–ียะ	/iaʔ/
–	–	–ิว	/iw/
–ัว	/ua/	–ัวะ	/uaʔ/
–ูย	/uːj/	–ุย	/uj/
เ–ว	/eːw/	เ–็ว	/ew/
แ–ว	/ɛːw/	–	–
เ–ือ	/ɯa/	เ–ือะ	/ɯaʔ/
เ–ย	/ɤːj/	–	–
–อย	/ɔːj/	–	–
โ–ย	/oːj/	–	–

Additionally, there are three triphthongs. For purposes of determining tone, those marked with an asterisk are sometimes classified as long:

Thai script	IPA
เ–ียว*	/iaw/
–วย*	/uaj/
เ–ือย*	/ɯaj/

== Differences from Central Thai ==
Of the major regional languages of Thailand, Southern Thai is the most similar to Central Thai in terms of its lexicon and grammar. However, the two languages are sufficiently different that mutual intelligibility can be problematic. Southern Thai is a diglossic language, with registers ranging from the most formal (Standard Central Thai with Southern Thai tones and accent) to the common vernacular (a contracted form of Thai expressions with some loan words from Malay). The Thai language was introduced during incursions by the Siamese into the Malay Peninsula, possibly starting as early as the Sukhothai Kingdom. During this period and those of successive kingdoms, the area in which Southern Thai is spoken was a frontier zone between Thai polities and Malay sultanates. A considerable number of Malay speakers lived in or near the Patani polity, interacting with Thai speakers through trade, and the Malay language was formerly considered a lingua franca in the southern part of the Malay Peninsula.

Although the Thai alphabet is often used when Southern Thai is written in informal situations, it is mainly a spoken language.

The words used that are etymologically Thai are often spoken in a reduced and rapid manner, making comprehension by speakers of other varieties difficult. Also, as Southern Thai uses up to seven tones in certain provinces, the tonal distribution is different from other regional varieties of Thai. Additionally, Southern Thai speakers almost always preserve ร as /r/ in contrast to Northern Thai, the Lao-based Isan language, and informal registers of Central Thai where it is generally realized as /l/.

Differences between Southern Thai and Central Thai
Dambro	Siam	English
หร่อย [rɔj]	อร่อย [ʔa.rɔ̀j]	delicious
ม่าย [maːj]	ไหม [mǎj]	question particle
แหลง [lɛːŋ]	พูด [pʰûːt]	to speak
จังหู้ [tɕaŋ huː]	มาก [mâːk]	a lot
ดีปรี [diː.priː]	พริก [pʰrík]	chilli
หลุหละ [lu.laʔ]	สกปรก [sòk ka.pròk]	dirty
หยีบ [jiːp]	ยี่สิบ [jîː sìp]	twenty
บาย [baːj]	สบาย [sa.bāːj]	to be well
ยานัด [jaː nat]	สับปะรด [sàp pa.rót]	pineapple
นากา [naː kaː]	นาฬิกา [nāː lí.kāː]	clock
ขี้มัน [kʰiː man]	ขี้เหนียว [kʰîː nǐaw]	stingy
พรือ [pʰrɯː]	อะไร [ʔa.rāj]	what?
ยัง [jaŋ]	มี [mīː]	to have
แค [kʰɛː]	ใกล้ [klâj]	near
พี่บ่าว [pʰiː baːw]	พี่ชาย [pʰîː tɕʰāːj]	older brother
เกือก [kɯak]	รองเท้า [rɔːŋ tʰáːw]	shoe
ตอเช้า [tɔː tɕʰaːw]	พรุ่งนี้ [pʰrûŋ níː]	tomorrow
พร้าว [pʰraːw]	มะพร้าว [ma.pʰráːw]	coconut
หลาด [laːt]	ตลาด [ta.làːt]	market
ตู [tuː]	ประตู [pra.tūː]	door
แล [lɛː]	ดู [duː]	to see
นายหัว [naːj hua]	หัวหน้า [hǔa.nâː]	boss

== Sources ==
- Bradley, David. (1992). "Southwestern Dai as a lingua franca." Atlas of Languages of Intercultural Communication in the Pacific, Asia, and the Americas. Vol. II.I:13, pp. 780–781.
- Levinson, David. Ethnic Groups Worldwide: A Ready Reference Handbook. Greenwood Publishing Group. ISPN: 1573560197.
- Miyaoka, Osahito. (2007). The Vanishing Languages of the Pacific Rim. Oxford University Press. ISBN 0-19-926662-X.
- Taher, Mohamed. (1998). Encyclopaedic Survey of Islamic Culture. Anmol Publications Pvt. Ltd. ISBN 81-261-0403-1.
- Yegar, Moshe. Between Integration and Secession: The Muslim Communities of the Southern Philippines, Southern Thailand, and Western Burma/Myanmar. Lexington Books. ISBN 0-7391-0356-3.
- Diller, A. Van Nostrand. (1976). Toward a Model of Southern Thai Diglossic Speech Variation. Cornell University Publishers.
- Li, Fang Kuei. (1977). A Handbook of Comparative Tai. University of Hawaii Press. ISBN 0-8248-0540-2.
