= Tahan River =

River in Pahang, Malaysia

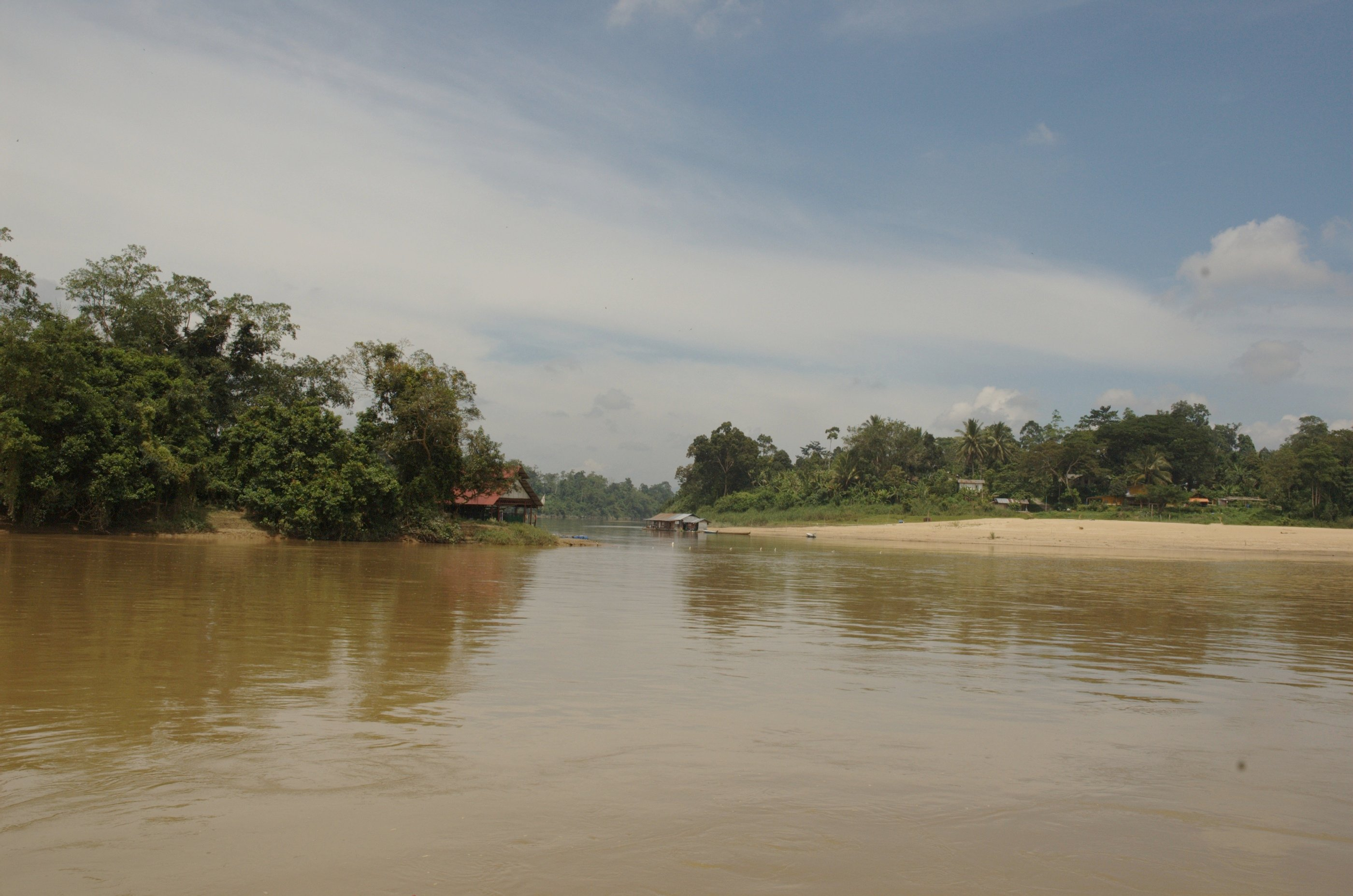
Tahan River

The Tahan River (Malay: Sungai Tahan) is a river that flows through Taman Negara in Malaysia. A popular hiking destination, it is generally accessed from a trail beginning at Kuala Tahan village in Jerantut District, Pahang.

Tahan River is one of the main tributary of Tembeling River. Together with Teku River, it forms the headwater of Tembeling River. The formation of this confluence can be seen in Teku Camp, one of the designated campsite of Mount Tahan in Taman Negara. The source of Tahan River is originated from Four Steps Waterfall. A remoted 150 meters height of four-tiered waterfall located deep in the jungle of Taman Negara. The waterfall can be reached within 8 - 9 days trekking with licensed guide. The river and waterfall itself is sacred among Orang Asli within Taman Negara.

== See also ==
- List of rivers of Malaysia
