= Taman Negara =

National park in Malaysia

- King George V National Park
- IUCN category II (national park)
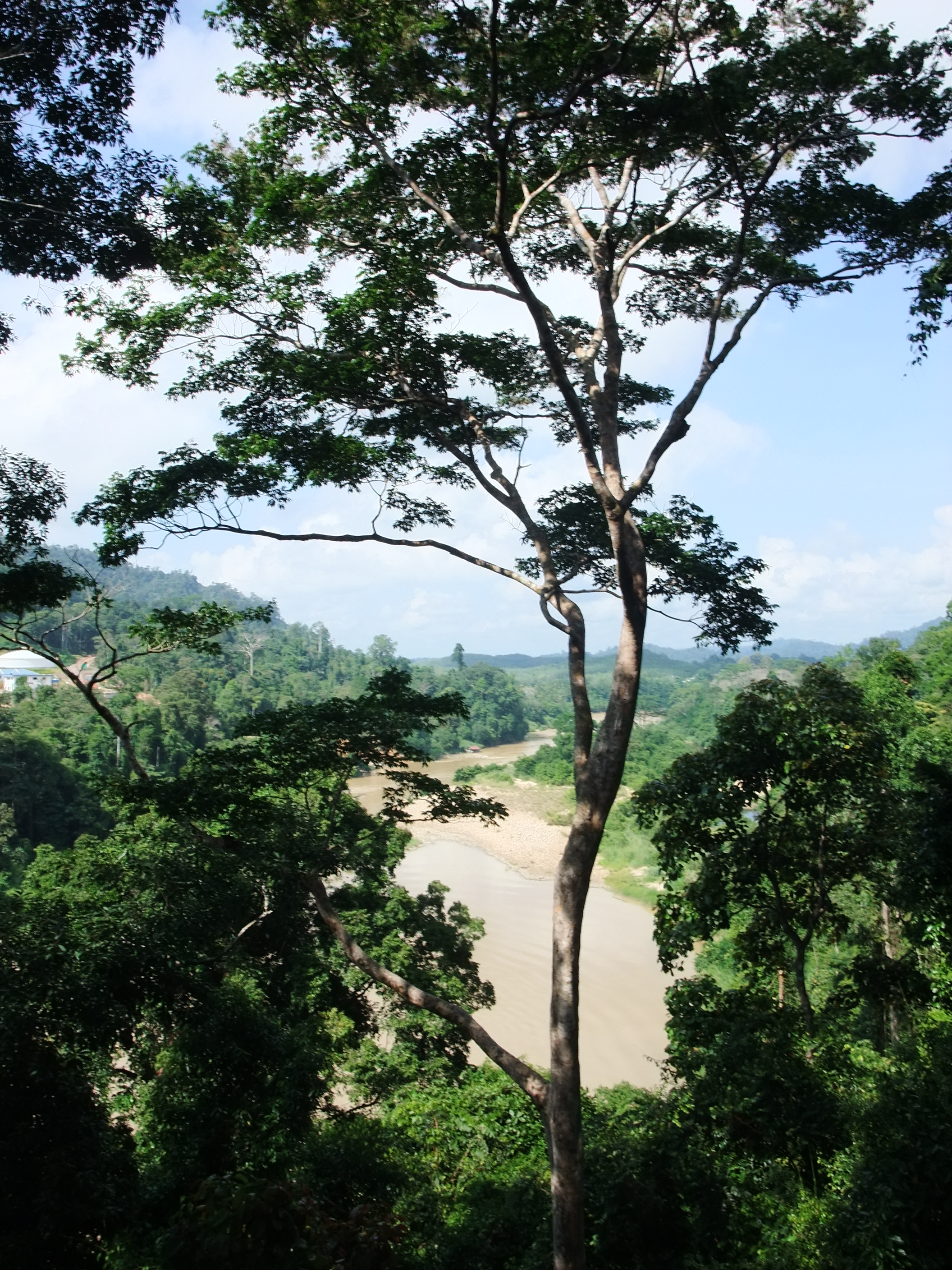
- View of Sungai Tembeling from atop the canopy walkway.

- Location within Malaysia
- Location: Malaysia; Pahang; Kelantan; Terengganu
- Nearest city: Kuala Tembeling
- Coordinates: 4°42′N 102°28′E
- Area: 4,343 km^{2} (1,677 sq mi)
- Established: 1938/1939
- Governing body: Department of Wildlife and National Parks

Taman Negara is a national park in Peninsular Malaysia. It was established in 1938 and 1939 as the King George V National Park after Theodore Hubback lobbied the sultans of Pahang, Terengganu and Kelantan to set aside a piece of land that covers the three states for the creation of a protected area. After independence, it was renamed Taman Negara, which means "national park" in Malay.

Taman Negara has a total area of 4,343 km^{2} and it is one of the world's oldest rainforests, estimated to be more than 130 million years old. Mount Tahan, Peninsular Malaysia's highest point with an elevation of 7,175 ft (2,187 m) above sea level, is within the park's boundaries. Taman Negara is an important conservation area for the Peninsular Malaysian rain forest and montane rain forest ecoregions, is rich in biodiversity and home to several endangered species such as the Malayan tiger and Asian elephant. The park exists on the traditional lands of several Orang Asli groups, such as the Batek people, whose use rights are recognised in the park's legislation.

A popular tourist attraction, the park is found near Kuala Tahan (where the Park headquarters for Pahang is located) and features a canopy walkway, the Gua Telinga cave system, and the Lata Berkoh rapids. Visitors can experience the tropical rainforest, birdwatching, jungle trekking, and the river views along the Tahan River, with many local resorts and hotels for visitors located nearby.

== Geography ==
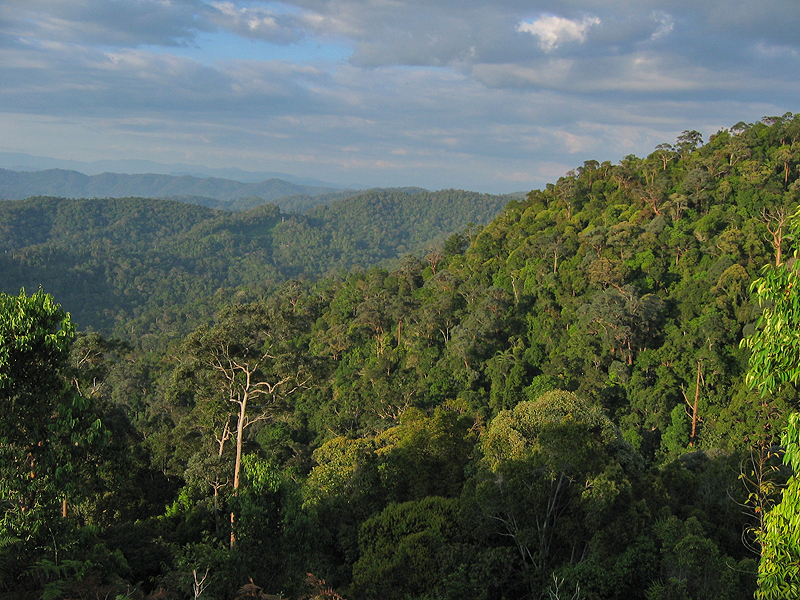
View over the canopy.

The park encompasses three states, Pahang, Kelantan and Terengganu, each with its own legislation. The Taman Negara Enactment (Pahang) No. 2 of 1939 is enforced in the state of Pahang, the Taman Negara Enactment (Kelantan) No. 14 of 1938 in the state of Kelantan and the Taman Negara Enactment (Terengganu) No. 6 of 1939 in the state of Terengganu. The enactments have similar contents.

Taman Negara Pahang is the largest at 2,477 km^{2}, followed by Taman Negara Kelantan at 1,043 km^{2} and Taman Negara Terengganu at 853 km^{2}. At an estimated age of more than 130 million years old, it is reputed to be the "oldest tropical rainforest", although the title more accurately belongs to the Daintree Rainforest in Queensland, Australia, estimated to be between 135 million years old and 180 million years old.

Taman Negara is mostly located on ancient, sedimentary rocks and the oldest part of the continent, it features mostly gentle rolling hills where about 57% of the total land area of the park are located below 300m above sea level due to a long time erosion. Despite that, it also features some mountainous parts of the Tahan Range, a subrange of the Tenasserim Hills. The Tahan Range is home to Mount Tahan, the highest and most prominent point in Peninsular Malaysia at about 2,187m above sea level.

The park acts as an important headwater for the states of Kelantan, Terengganu and Pahang. There are three main river systems that originated from The park, which are the Lebir, Terengganu and Tembeling Rivers. The Lebir is one of the tributaries of the Kelantan River, flowing northward passing through Kelantan Delta, while the Terengganu River flows eastward toward Kenyir Lake and is one of the primary inflow for the lake; and Tembeling River is one of the tributaries of the Pahang River, flowing southward towards the central valley of Pahang. These rivers ultimately discharge into the South China Sea.

The park has been developed into an ecotourism destination in Malaysia. There are several geological and biological attractions in the park. Gunung Tahan is the highest point of the Malay Peninsula; climbers can use Kuala Tahan or Merapoh as their departure point. All visitors to the park must obtain permits from the Department of Wildlife and National Parks.

== Indigenous people ==
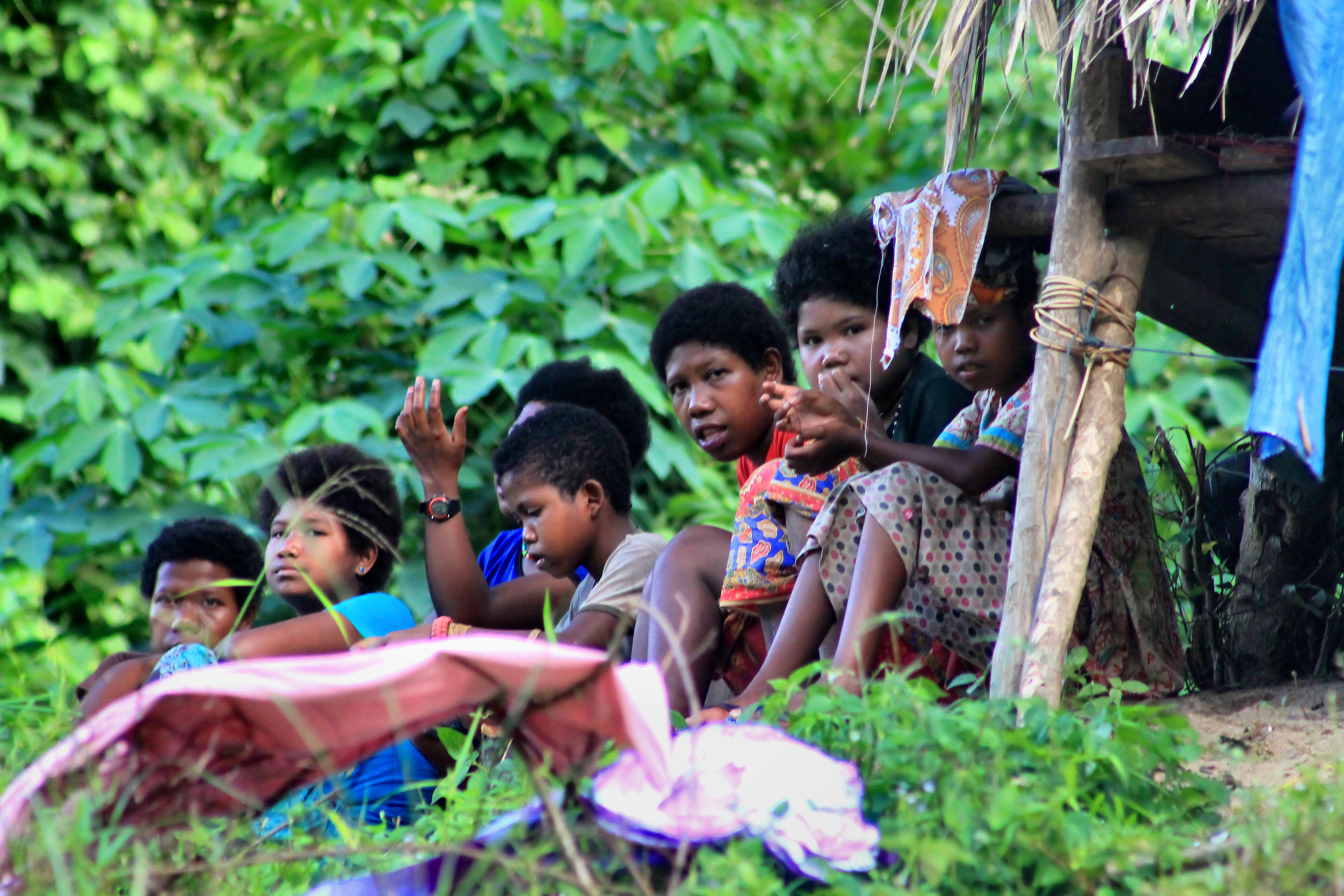
Batek people near Taman Negara.

Taman Negara is part of the traditional territory of several groups of Orang Asli, the indigenous people of Peninsular Malaysia. In particular, several groups of Batek people still live on the periphery of the park. The park legislation recognises use-rights of Orang Asli within Taman Negara (e.g. section 15(c), Pahang En. 2/1939). In this regard, six "aboriginal tribes" are listed (Ple, Temiar, Ple-Temiar, Senoi, Semang, and Pangan).

== Flora ==
Taman Negara features a largely virgin, lowland dipterocarp rainforest as well as Peninsular Malaysian montane rain forests on the higher elevation parts of the park.

== Fauna ==
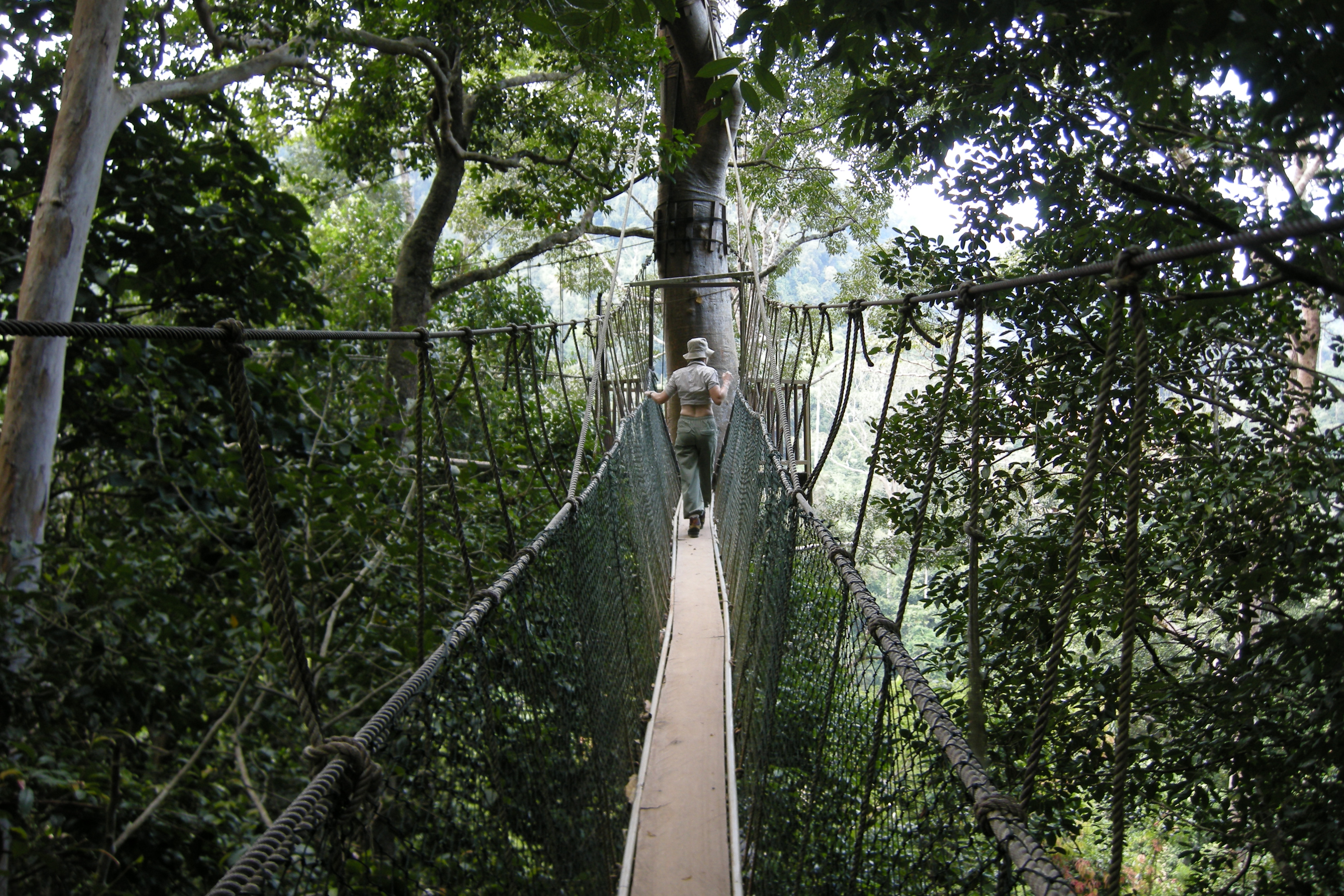
Canopy walkway.

Taman Negara is home to some rare mammals, such as the Malayan tiger, Malayan gaur (seladang) and Asian elephant. Additionally, some biologists also believe that a small population of Northern Sumatran Rhinoceros live in the park. As well as birds such as the great argus, red junglefowl, and the rare Malayan peacock-pheasant are still found here in some numbers. Tahan River has been preserved to protect the Malaysian mahseer (ikan kelah in Malay), a type of game fish. Species found in the park include 10,000 plants, 150,000 of insects, 25,000 invertebrates, 675 birds, 270 reptiles, 250 freshwater fish and 200 mammals at the national park, including some of which are rare or indigenous to Malaysia.

== Transportation ==
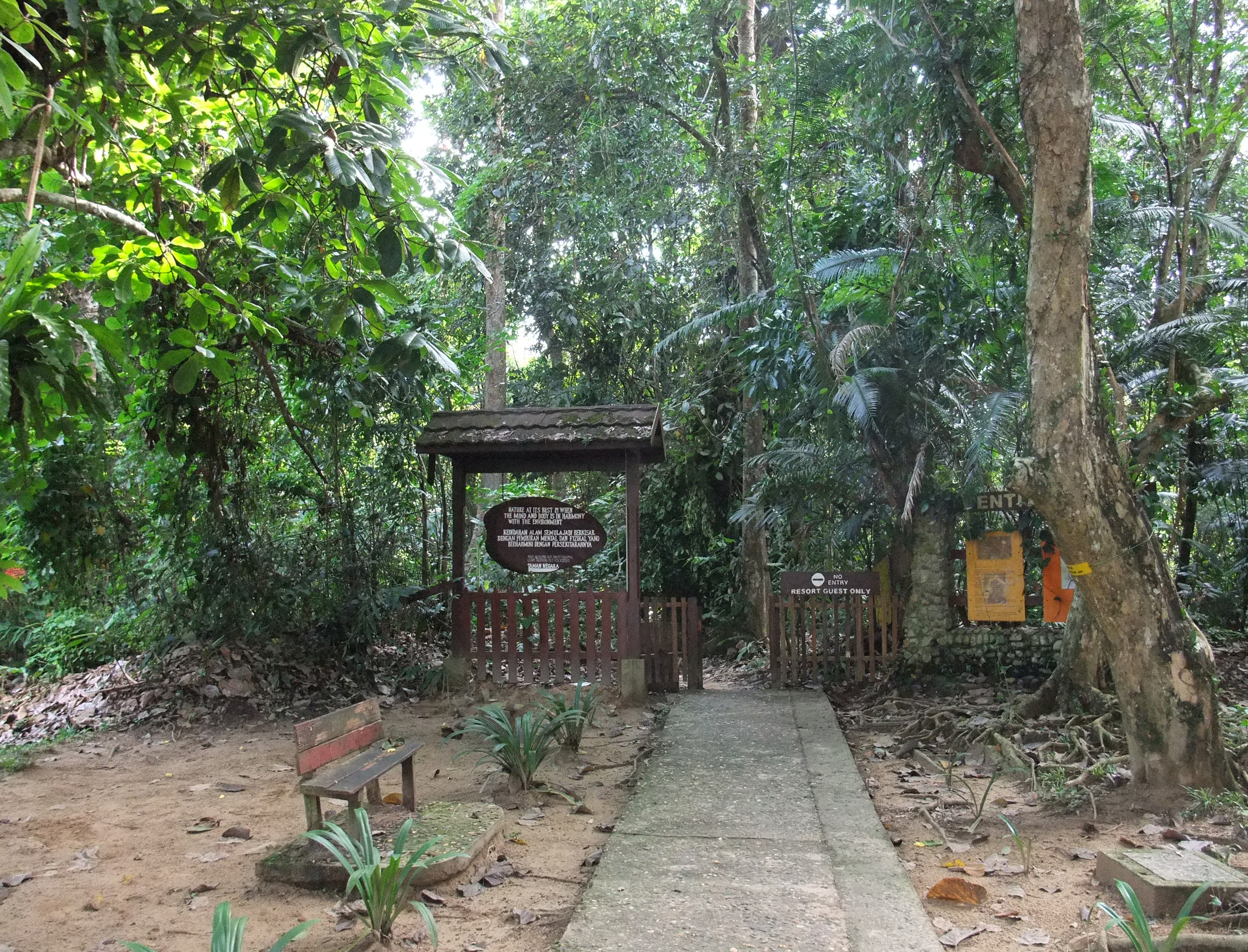
Entrance at Kuala Tahan.

Keretapi Tanah Melayu (KTM)'s KTM Intercity and Express trains stop at Jerantut railway station. Visitors to Taman Negara can disembark here.

Local tour operators arrange transportation from Kuala Lumpur to the entrance of the Park at Kuala Tahan. This may involve a 3-4 hour bus journey to Jerantut and Kuala Tembeling Jetty followed by a 2.5 hour river boat ride to Kuala Tahan. Entrance permits and park tours are often included in the package.

From Kuala Lumpur, buses may depart from Terminal Bersepadu Selatan and Hentian Pekeliling going to the nearest town, Jerantut. From here travel to Kuala Tembeling Jetty and Kuala Tahan.

== In the media ==
Taman Negara was featured in cartoonist, Lat's 1980 compilation of New Straits Times cartoons, With a Little Bit of Lat, published in 1980 by Berita Publishing.

The park also became the subject matter in 1998 documentary film, Taman Negara: Destinasi Alam Semulajadi, produced by Filem Negara Malaysia.

Taman Negara is featured in the first episode of the Apple TV+ docuseries, The Wild Ones.

== See also ==
- List of national parks of Malaysia
- Gunung Tahan, the highest point in Peninsular Malaysia
- List of old-growth forests
