= Kerambit railway station =

Railway station in Malaysia

Kerambit

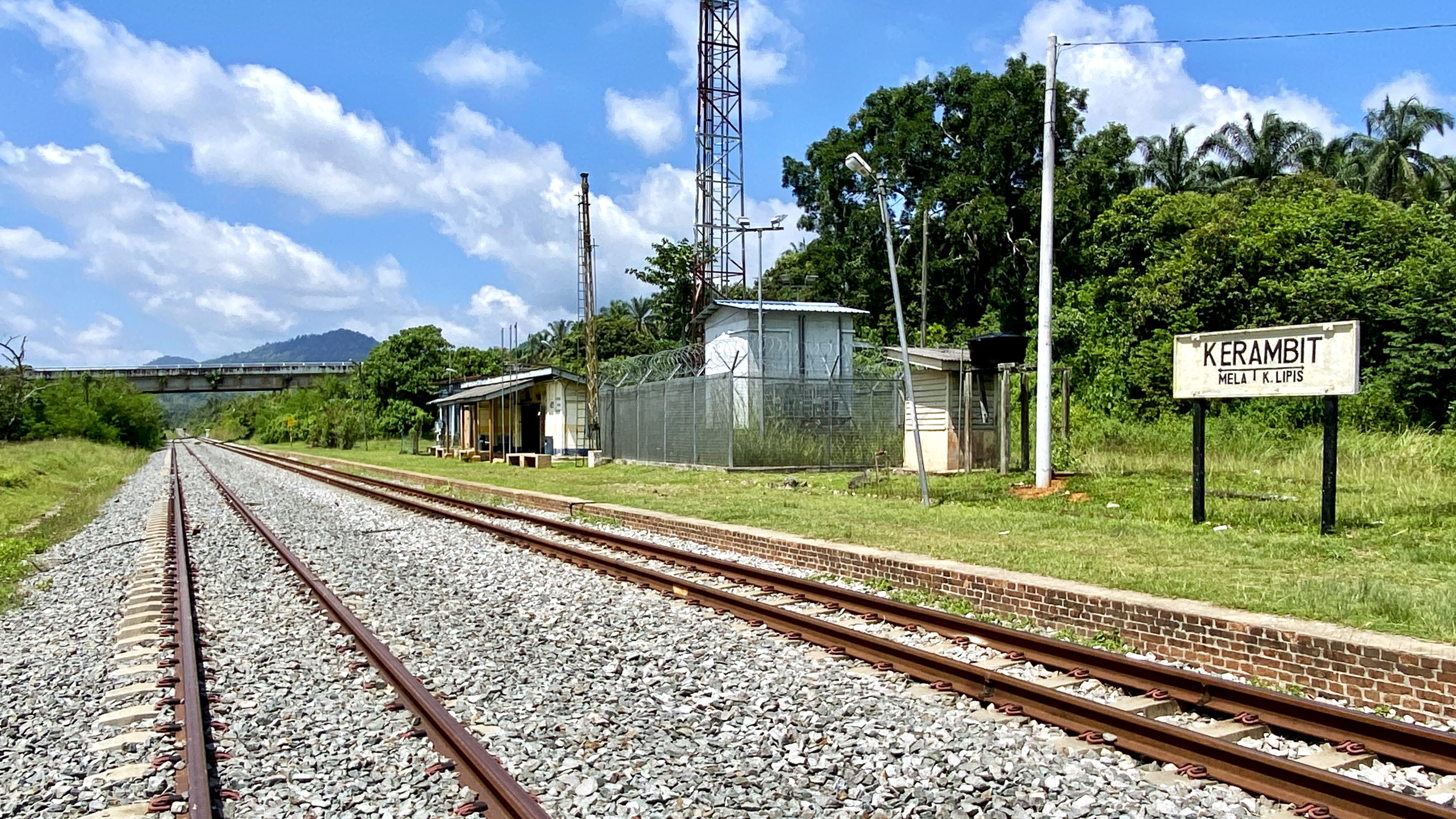
- Kerambit railway station

General information
- Other names: Malay: کرمبيت (Jawi); Chinese: 吉南蜜; Tamil: கெராம்பிட்
- Location: Kerambit, Lipis District; Pahang; Malaysia
- Owner: Railway Assets Corporation
- Operator: Keretapi Tanah Melayu
- Line: East Coast Line
- Platforms: 1 side platform 1 island platform
- Tracks: 3

Construction
- Parking: Available, free.
- Accessible: Y

Services
Preceding station	Keretapi Tanah Melayu (Intercity)	Following station
Kuala Lipis towards Tumpat	Ekspres Rakyat Timuran	Jerantut towards Johor Bahru Sentral
Kuala Lipis Terminus	Shuttle Timur	Mela Halt towards Gemas
Location

The Kerambit railway station is a Malaysian train station located at and named after the town of Kerambit in the Lipis District of the state of Pahang.

== Train services ==
The station is served by the following KTM Intercity services:

- Ekspres Rakyat Timuran 26/27 Tumpat–JB Sentral
- Shuttle Timur 30/31/34/35/38/39 Gemas-Kuala Lipis
