= Ayothaya =

Ayothaya (Thai: อโยธยา; from Sanskrit अयोध्य ayōdhya, "unconquerable") may refer to several places:

- Ayodhya, a city in India
- Ayodhya, a legendary city featured in the Ramayana.
- Ayothaya (city), ancient city in present-day Thailand, being a vassal state of Lavo Kingdom and the predecessor of Ayutthaya Kingdom
- Ayutthaya Kingdom, called Ayothaya until it was conquered by King Bayinnaung of Burma
- Ayothaya (town), town in Phra Nakhon Si Ayutthaya Province, Thailand
- Ayutthaya United F.C., football club in Thailand
- Bang Pa-in Ayutthaya F.C., football club in Thailand

== See also ==
- Ayutthaya (disambiguation)
