= Merapoh railway station =

Railway station in Malaysia

Coordinates: 4°41′35″N 102°00′10″E

Merapoh

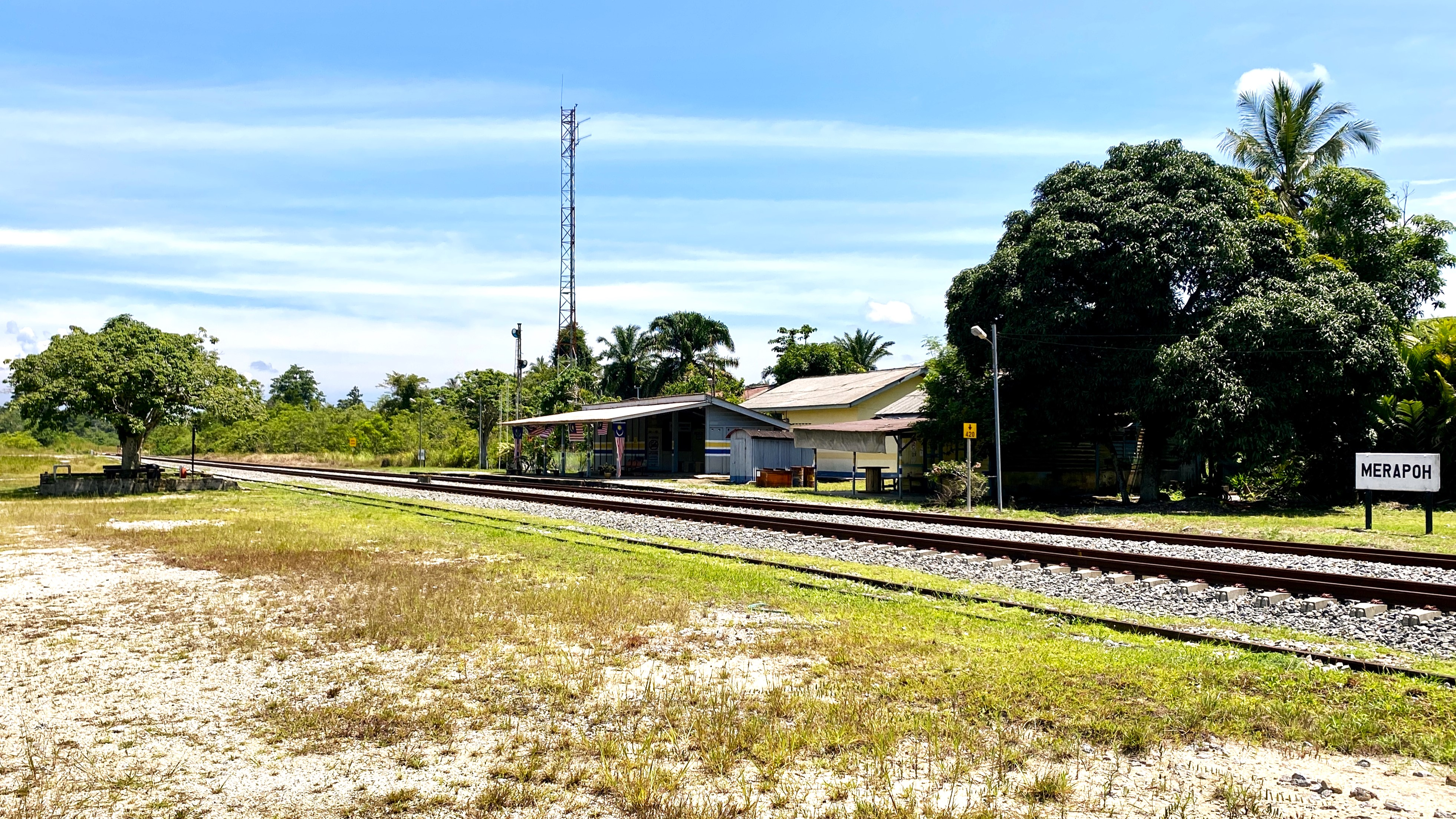
- Merapoh Railway Station

General information
- Other names: Malay: مراڤوه (Jawi); Chinese: 美拉坡; Tamil: மெராப்போ
- Location: Merapoh, Lipis District; Pahang; Malaysia
- Owner: Railway Assets Corporation
- Operator: Keretapi Tanah Melayu
- Line: East Coast Line
- Platforms: 1 side platform
- Tracks: 3

Construction
- Platform levels: 2
- Parking: Available, free.
- Accessible: Yes

Services
Preceding station	Keretapi Tanah Melayu (Intercity)	Following station
Gua Musang towards Tumpat	Ekspres Rakyat Timuran	Kuala Lipis towards Johor Bahru Sentral
Mentara Baru Halt towards Tumpat	Shuttle Timur	Telok Gunong Halt towards Kuala Lipis
Mentara Baru Halt towards Gua Musang	Shuttle Timur	Telok Gunong Halt towards Kuala Lipis
Location

The Merapoh railway station is a Malaysian train station of the KTM East Coast Line located and named after the town of Merapoh, Lipis District, Pahang.

== Train services ==
The station is served by the following KTM Intercity services:

- Ekspres Rakyat Timuran 26/27 Tumpat–JB Sentral
- Shuttle Timur 50/53/58/59 Gua Musang–Kuala Lipis
