= Thai Malays =

Ethnic group

ไทยเชื้อสายมลายู ملايو تاي Orang Melayu Thailand Oré Jawi Bangso Yawi Oghae Nayu
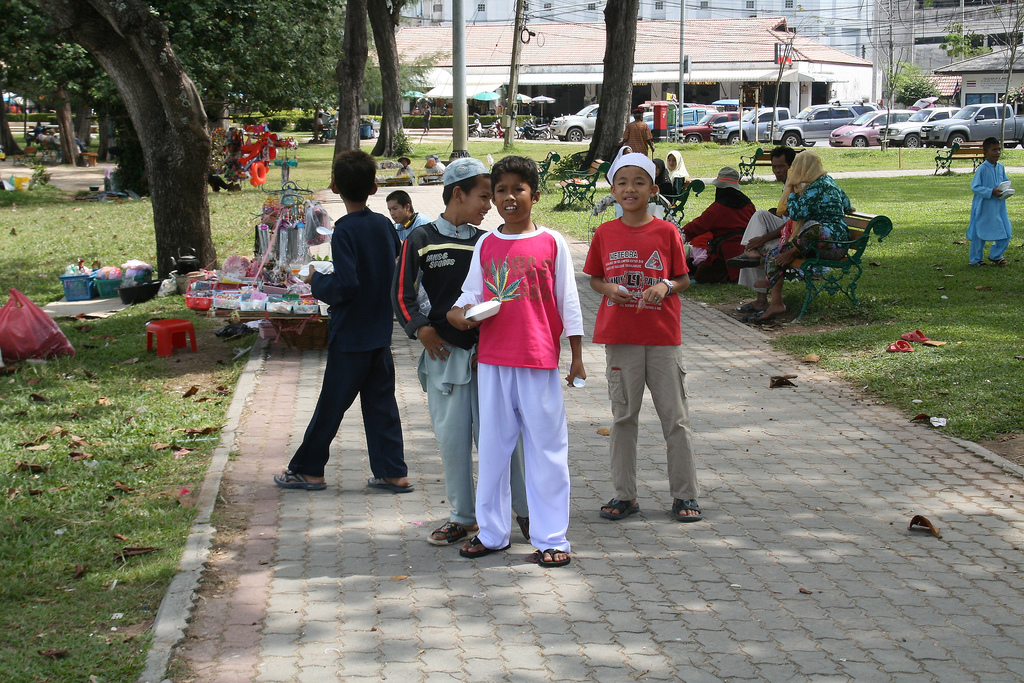
- Thai Malay boys in Songkhla

Total population
- 1.5 million (2018, est.)

Regions with significant populations
- Thailand; Malaysia

Languages
- Malayic languages: (Kelantan-Pattani Malay; Songkhla Malay, Satun Malay; Bangkok Malay); Thai and Southern Thai

Religion
- Sunni Islam

Related ethnic groups
- Other Malays

Thai Malays (Standard Malay: Orang Melayu Thailand/Siam, Thai: ไทยเชื้อสายมลายู: Jawi: ملايو تاي; Pattani Malay: Oré Nayu Siae, Bangso Yawi; Bangkok Malay: Oghae Nayu Thai), with officially recognised terms including 'Malayu-descended Thais' and 'Malay', is a term used to refer to ethnic Malay citizens of Thailand, the sixth largest ethnic group in Thailand. Thailand is home to the third largest ethnic Malay population after Malaysia and Indonesia. Most Malays live primarily in the four southernmost provinces of Yala, Narathiwat, Satun and Pattani. They live in one of the country’s poorest regions. They also live in Songkhla, Phuket and Ranong. Trang province, home to a sizeable Muslim population, also has many people who are of Malay descent. Some live in Thailand's capital, Bangkok. They are descended from migrants or deportees who were relocated from the South from the 13th century onwards.

== History and politics ==
Separatist inclinations among ethnic Malays in Narathiwat, Pattani, Yala and Songkhla provinces, the cause of the Southern Thai insurgency, are due in part to cultural differences from the Thai people as well as past experiences of forced attempts to assimilate them into Thai mainstream culture after the annexation of the Sultanate of Patani by Siamese Rattanakosin Kingdom. In 1816, Siam divided the sultanate into seven provinces as part of a policy of 'divide and rule'. Despite occasional subsequent rebellions, the policy was generally successful in ensuring peace until the beginning of the twentieth century. In 1901, Siam restructured the seven provinces into a single administrative unit, 'Monthon Pathani', under the new Ministry of the Interior, which consolidated the seven provinces into four: Patani, Bangnara, Saiburi and Yala. Kedah was then ceded to the British under the Anglo-Siamese Treaty of 1909, in which a more integrated district formerly belonging to Kedah became Satun Province. The Malay Muslims of Satun are less inclined towards separatism; this is largely a result of the historical affinity of the Malay King of Setul towards Siam, compared to the violent breakup of the Sultanate of Patani. Pro-Thai inclinations can also be observed in Malay communities in Phuket, Ranong and Bangkok.

In 1975, five Thai Malays were killed by Thai soldiers and their bodies thrown over a bridge into the Saiburi in Bacho district. The incident, known as Koto Bridge incident, sparked a massive demonstration in Pattani province, lasting 45 days. It marked one of the biggest demonstrations of Thai Malays, and in Thai history at the time.

== Culture ==
Demographic map of Thailand in 1974, showing the distribution of ethnic groups across the country, with Thai Malays concentrated in the southern provinces and highlighted in purple.

=== Sub-ethnicity ===
- Bangkok Malay (Melayu Bangkok)
- Patani Malay (Melayu Patani)
  - Pattani/Songkhla (Singgora) Malay
  - Narathiwat/Tak Bai Malay (Kelantanese)
  - Yala/Reman Malay
- Syiburi Malay (Melayu Kedah)
  - Setun Malay
  - Krabi Malay
  - Trang Malay
  - Ranong Malay
  - Phuket Malay

=== Cuisine ===
In Province Pattani, Narathiwat & Yala also known as 3 Malay regions/Province (kawasan 3 wilayah) having and practicing the same culture as the state of Kelantan, Malaysia. They also speak the same language but some different because Standard Malay education is non-open and not supported by the Thai government which causes them to sometimes mix Malay and Thai.

=== Language ===
The majority of Malays in Thailand speak a distinct variety of Malay known as Pattani Malay (Yawi: Baso Yawi/Pattani). However, not all Thai Malays speak Pattani Malay, some people who live in Satun and its vicinage use another distinct variety of Malay known as Satun Malay, while the Malays up north in Bangkok have developed their distinct variant of Malay that incorporated elements of localism with visible Pattani-Kedahan Malay dialect influences known as Bangkok Malay (Bangkok Malay: Bangkok Melayu/Nayu). The Bangkok, Kedahan and Pattani are closely related and shared many similar vocabularies but still mutually partly unintelligible.

With the introduction of Islam to Southeast Asia, the Malays use a modified version of the Arabic script known as Jawi. Unlike other parts of the Malay world, like Malaysia, Singapore and Indonesia, where the usage of Jawi is declining rapidly from the increasing usage of the Latin alphabet, Jawi is still widely used and understood among Malays in Thailand.

=== Religion ===
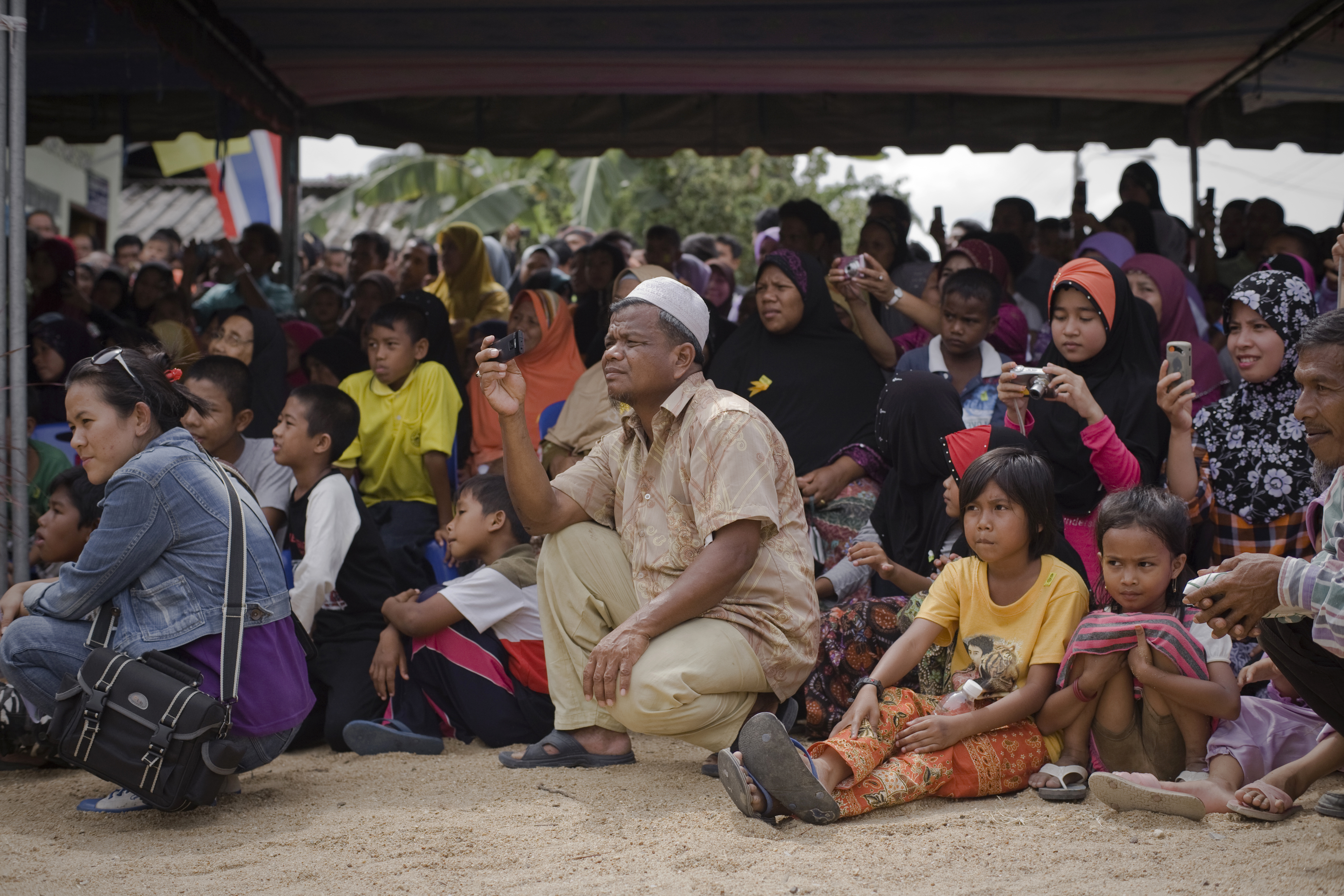
Thai Malays in 2011

Thai Malays are mainly Sunni Muslims. They're mostly of the Shafi'i school of thought. Islam is the defining element of the Thai Malay identity.

== Notable individuals ==
- Thao Thep Kasattri and Thao Sri Sunthon – Heroine and Ancestors of na Thalâng Clan. (Malay descent from Phuket)
- Wan Muhamad Noor Matha (Wanmuhamatno Matha) – Thai Politician (Malay descent from Yala)
- Adul Lahsoh – Thai footballer (Malay descent from Phatthalung)
- Jirayut
- Nurul Sriyankem
- Supachai Jaided
- Abdulhafiz Bueraheng
- Sompong Soleb
- Airfan Doloh
- Surin Pitsuwan – 12th General Secretary of ASEAN
- Elias Dolah
- Rosenanee Kanoh – Thai women's cricketer
- Soraya Lateh – Thai women's cricketer
- Denkaosan Kaovichit
- Muhammad Osamanmusa

== See also ==
- Ethnic groups in Thailand
- Islam in Thailand
- Mahsuri
- Malaysian Siamese
- South Thailand insurgency
