= Tembeling River =

River in Pahang, Malaysia

Coordinates: 4°04′N 102°19′E

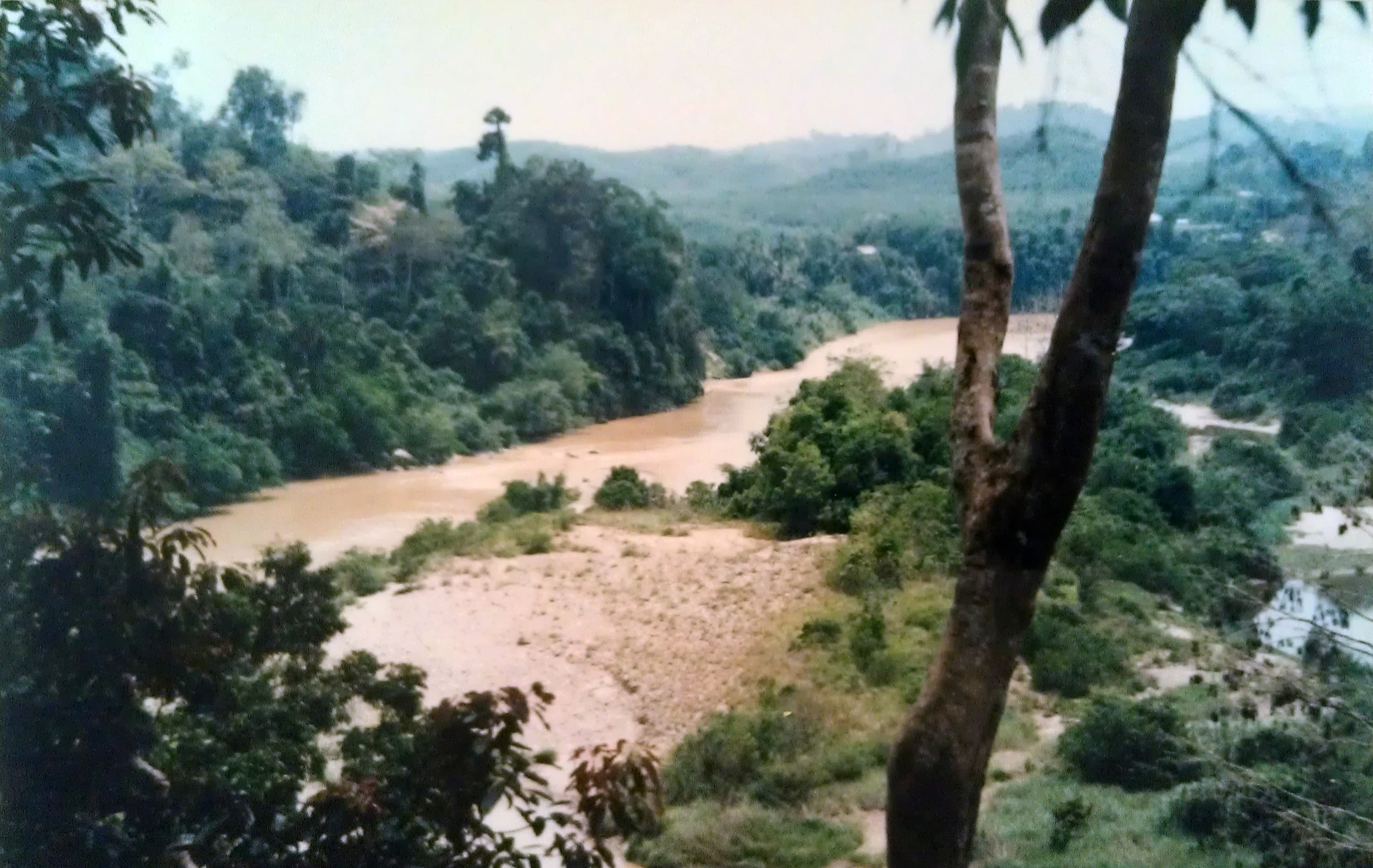
- View of the Tembeling from the Taman Negara.
- Native name: Sungai Tembeling (Malay)

Location
- Country: Malaysia
- State: Pahang

Physical characteristics
- Source: Pantai Timur Range
  - location: Ulu Tembeling, Jerantut District
- Mouth: Pahang River
  - location: Kuala Tembeling, Jerantut District

Basin features
- Progression: Pahang > South China Sea

The Tembeling River (Malay: Sungai Tembeling) is in Pahang, Malaysia. It is a main tributary of the Pahang River, which is the longest river in the Malay Peninsula at 459 km.

== See also ==
- List of rivers of Malaysia
