= Merapoh =

Town in Pahang, Malaysia

Coordinates: 4°42′N 102°00′E

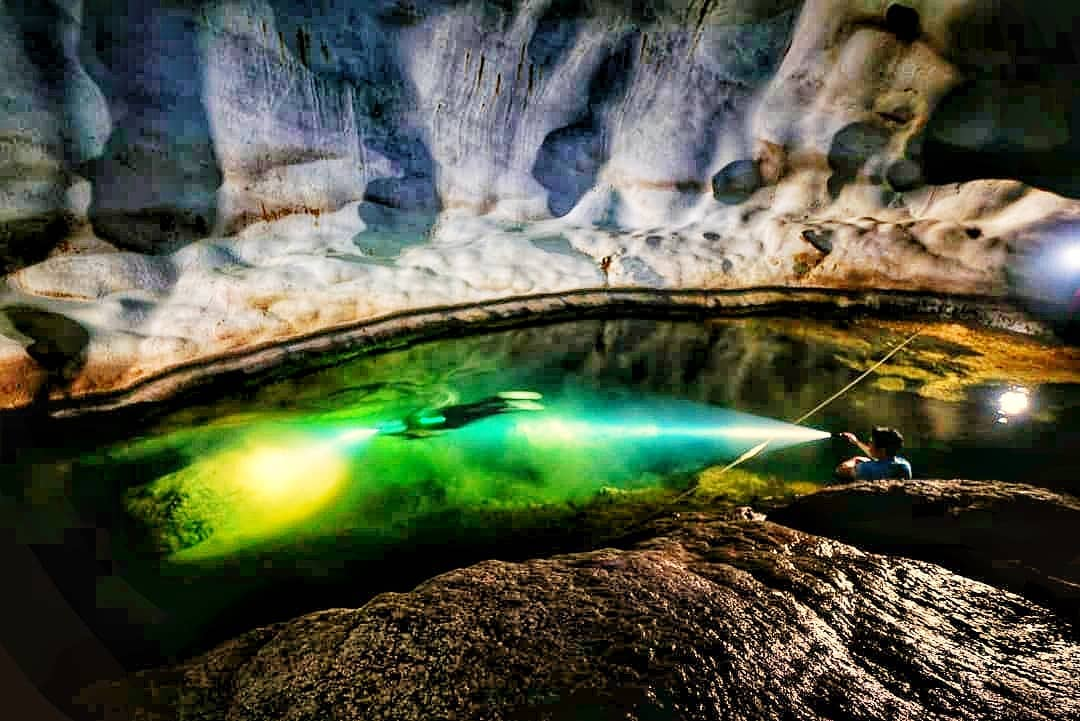
Jinjang Pelamin Cave, Merapoh

Merapoh is a small town in Lipis District, Pahang, Malaysia. It is located next to the Pahang-Kelantan border. A railway station of the KTM East Coast Line is located here.

From Merapoh it is 7 km to Sg Relau, one of the entry points to Taman Negara. One of Malaysia's popular spots for spelunking activities, Merapoh is also known for its karst landscape.

Jalan Bukit Tujuh (Seven Hill Road) is an infamous short strip of road along the route from Merapoh in the state of Pahang to Gua Musang in the state of Kelantan. The strip which is in the state of Pahang, lies on a slope with a very high inclination angle. It is on this strip that two saddening incidents happened in the 1980s; the road laden with travelers returning for the festive season collapsed suddenly, taking along a few vehicles. Rescue was difficult since the strip is secluded, the nearest residential area were very far away. Victims trapped in vehicles that were unable to be dug-out were left buried. The incident made front-page news on local newspaper. As of 2009, a new strip of road has been built next to the old tragic road. Faint traces of the old road is noticeable to travelers seasoned with this road. Jalan Bukit Tujuh is a constituent of Malaysia Federal Route 8.
