= Kelantan–Pattani Malay =

Austronesian language

- Baso/Kecek Taning; Baso/Kecek Klate; Baso/Kecek Nayu (only in Thailand); Baso Jawi
- ภาษายาวี بهاس ملايو ڤطاني / كلنتن; Bahasa Melayu Kelantan/Pattani
- Native to: Malaysia, Thailand
- Region: Malaysia: Kelantan; Merapoh, Pahang; Besut and Setiu, Terengganu; Baling, Sik and Padang Terap, Kedah; Hulu Perak (Pengkalan Hulu and Grik), Perak; Thailand: Pattani; Songkhla; Yala; Narathiwat
- Ethnicity: Patani Malays; Bangkok Malays; Kelantanese Malays; Baling Malays; Grik Malays; Reman Malays
- Native speakers: 1.5 million in Thailand (2010); 2 million in Malaysia
- Language family: Austronesian: Malayo-Polynesian; Malayic; Kelantan–Pattani Malay
- Writing system: Latin script Thai script Jawi script

Official status
- Recognised minority language in: Thailand

Language codes
- ISO 639-3: mfa Pattani
- Glottolog: patt1249
- Linguasphere: 33-AFA-cb (Kelantan); 33-AFA-cc (Pattani)
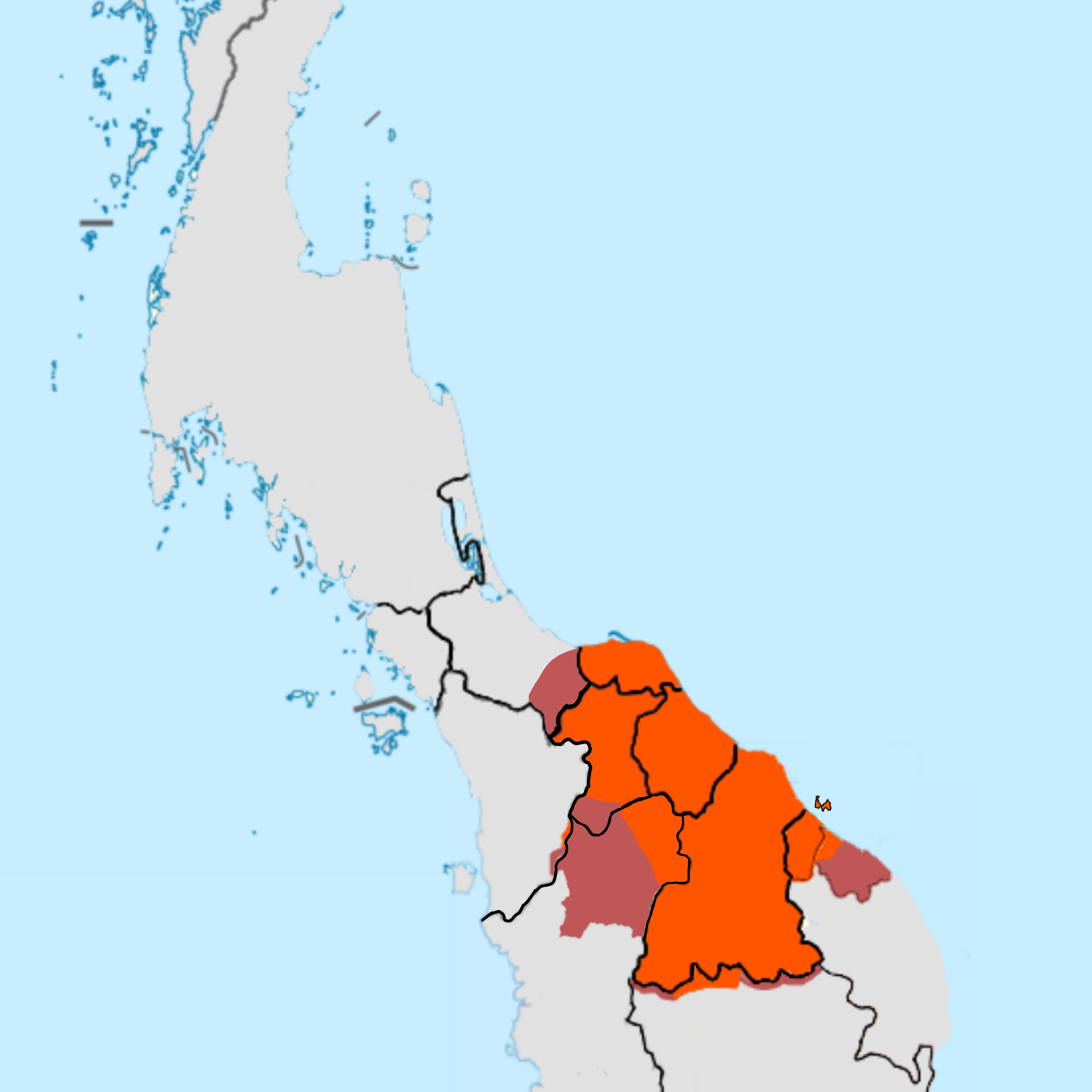
- Majority language Minority language

Kelantan–Pattani Malay (Malay: bahasa Melayu Kelantan–Patani; Thai: ภาษายาวี; บาซอ/แกแจะ 'นายู in Pattani; baso/kecek Klate in Kelantan) is an Austronesian language of the Malayic subfamily spoken in the Malaysian state of Kelantan, as well as in Besut and Setiu districts of Terengganu state and the Perhentian Islands, and in the southernmost provinces of Thailand. It is the primary spoken language of Thai Malays and used as a lingua franca by ethnic Southern Thais in rural areas, Muslim and non-Muslim and the Sam-Sam, a mostly Thai-speaking population of mixed Malay and Thai ancestry.

Kelantan–Pattani Malay is highly divergent from other Malay varieties because of its geographical isolation from the rest of the Malay world by high mountains, deep rainforests and the Gulf of Thailand. It is also influenced by Thai in Thailand.

Kelantanese–Pattani Malay is distinct enough that radio broadcasts in Standard Malay cannot be understood easily by native speakers of Kelantan–Pattani Malay, such as those in Thailand, who are not taught the standard variety of the language. Unlike Malaysia, where Standard Malay is compulsory in the school curriculum, no one is required to learn Standard Malay in Thailand and so there is potentially less language influence from Standard Malay but potentially more from Thai. It is also distinct from Kedah Malay, Pahang Malay and Terengganu Malay, but those languages are much more closely related to the Kelantanese-Pattani Malay language than Standard Malay.

== Names ==
The language is often referred to in Thai as phasa Yawi (Thai: ภาษายาวี; IPA: [pʰāːsǎː jāːwīː]), which is a corruption of the Malay name for the modified Arabic alphabet for writing Malay, Jawi (جاوي; IPA [ɟaˈwi]). It is also referred to in Thai as phasa Malayu Pattani (Thai: ภาษามลายูปัตตานี; IPA: [pʰāːsǎː mālāːjūː pàttāːnīː]) and similarly locally in Malay as bahasa Melayu Patani (Jawi: بهاس ملايو ڤطاني). The language is often called baso Taning, or baso Nayu Taning (Malay pronunciation: [baˈsɔ ˈnːaju ˈtːaniŋ]) in local varieties of Pattani.

Kelantanese is known in Standard Malay as bahasa Kelantan, and in Kelantanese as baso Kelate. It is also known as baso Besut or Kecek Kelate-Besut in Besut and Setiu of Terengganu State.

One variant of Kelantan–Pattani Malay is the Reman variant, also known as bahasa Reman, according to the speakers of this area. The areas where this variant was spoken were under the Reman state of the Kingdom of Pattani that was abolished in 1902 in which the areas were Batu Kurau, inland Perak (Gerik, Pengkalan Hulu, Lenggong) and inland Kedah (Sik, Baling, Padang Terap). This Reman variant has many dialects and subdialects, with local endonyms, across the areas where this variant is spoken.

== Writing system ==
Kelantanese Malay is written both in Latin and in the Jawi alphabet, a writing system based on the Arabic script. This is in stark contrast to the rest of the general population of Malay speakers in both Malaysia and Indonesia that now mainly use the Latin script, known in Malay as rumi (رومي), for daily communication. Today, Pattani Malay is generally not a written language, though it is sometimes written in informal settings. An old-fashioned form of standard Malay is used when writing is needed rather than the local dialect. A phonetic rendering of Pattani Malay in the Thai alphabet has been introduced, but it has not been met with much success due to the socio-religious significance of Jawi to Muslim Malays.

== History ==
Southern Thailand has continued to be a region affected by two cultural spheres: the mainly Buddhist, Thai-speaking Siamese kingdoms and the mainly Muslim, Malay-speaking sultanates. The region was a warehouse of trade where merchants from Europe, India, Arabia, China, Siam, and other parts of the Malay world met. At first dominated by Hindu-Buddhist Indian influences, the great kingdom of Srivijaya would later fall into chaos. Islam was introduced by Arab and Indian traders in the 11th century and has been the dominant religion ever since, replacing Buddhism and Hinduism that had held sway. By the 14th century, the area became vassals to Ayutthaya, but the region was autonomous and never fully incorporated into modern Thai nation-state until 1902. This political autonomy and isolation from the rest of the Malay world allowed for the preservation of the Malay language and culture but also led to the divergence of the dialect.

== Variation ==
Kelantan–Pattani Malay can be divided into three major variants and several dialects (and a few subdialects):

Kelantan: Coastal (Narathiwat, Besut dialects), Central / River, Dabong / Inland

Pattani: Yala, Saiburi, Bana Taning, Chenok / Chana, Nonthaburi / Bangkok

Reman: Grik, Sik, Baling, Padang Terap, Batu Kugho / Selama, Southern Yala

- The Reman variants of Kedah and Perak show some vocabulary influence from Perak Malay and Kedah Malay (e.g. mika ('you'), ang/hang ('you'), ciwi ('brag/show off'), etc.).

Creole/Pidgin: Samsam Malay (a mixed language of Thai and Pattani Malay spoken by those of mixed Thai-Malay ancestry)

== Distribution ==
Kelantanese is spoken in the Malaysian state of Kelantan, as well as in Besut and Setiu districts of Terengganu and the Perhentian Islands. It is also spoken in the Merapoh township, in the Lipis district of Pahang since this town borders the state of Kelantan.

Many people in the districts of Baling, Sik and Padang Terap in Kedah as well as the Hulu Perak district of Perak speak Kelantan-Patani language of Reman dialects, since most of the Malay people there are the descendants of Kelantanese migrants and Pattani refugees (in which whereby these regions were once parts of the Reman Kingdom of Pattani).

Pattani Malay is the main language of the Thai provinces Narathiwat, Yala and Pattani where ethnic Malays make up the majority of the population, it is also spoken in parts of Songkhla and Bangkok. It is less spoken in the province of Satun, where despite making up the majority, ethnic Malays generally speak Southern Thai and their Malay dialect is similar to Kedah Malay. It is also spoken in scattered villages as far north as Hat Yai. In the past, Malay was the main language as far north as the Isthmus of Kra, the traditional division between Central Thailand and Southern Thailand, based on the preponderance of etymologically Malay place names.

== Comparison with Standard Malay ==
Kelantan–Pattani Malay is different enough from Standard Malay that it is often unintelligible to speakers of the standard language. Differences include some differences in vocabulary, and different sound correspondences. The influence of Southern Thai and the Kelantan–Pattani Malay in Pattani upon each other is great, and both have large numbers of loanwords from the other. The influence of the Thai language makes comprehension between the Pattani variety of Kelatan-Pattani Malay and Standard Malay a bit more difficult than comprehension between the Kelantanese variety of Kelantan–Pattani Malay and Standard Malay.

=== Vowels ===
Correspondence Rule (SM ≙ KPM)			Standard Malay (SM)		Kelantan–Pattani Malay (KPM)	English Translation
Final /a/ with nasal coda	≙	Nasal [ɛ̃]	ayam	/ajam/	[ajɛ̃]	'chicken'
Initial /ia/	≙	Open-mid front [ɛ]	biasa	/biasa/	[bɛsɔ]	'normal'
/ah/ before [ɛ̃]	≙	Open-mid front [ɛ]	bahan	/bahan/	[bɛhɛ̃]	'ingredient'
/an/ before [ɛ̃]	≙	Open-mid front [ɛ]	makanan	/makanan/	[mãkɛnɛ̃]	'food'
/a/ in final /ah/	≙	Open-mid [ɔ]	rumah	/rumah/	[ɣumɔh]	'house'
/a/ in final /ak/	≙	Open-mid [ɔ]	masak	/masak/	[masɔʔ]	'cooking'
Final /a/ in open-ended words	≙	Open-mid [ɔ]	sana	/sana/	[sanɔ]	'there'
Initial /ua/	≙	Open-mid [ɔ]	puasa	/puasa/	[pɔsɔ]	'fasting'
Final /ai/	≙	Open [a]	sungai	/suŋai/	[suŋa]	'river'
Final /au/	≙	Open [a]	pisau	/pisau/	[pisa]	'knife'
/an/ before consonant	≙	Open [a]	santan	/santan/	[satɛ̃]	'coconut milk'
/u/ in coda /uŋ/	≙	Nasal [ũ]	mungkin	/muŋkin/	[mũkiŋ]	'maybe'

=== Consonants ===
Correspondence Rule (SM ≙ KPM)			Standard Malay (SM)		Kelantan–Pattani Malay (KPM)	English Translation
Final coda /f/	≙	Glottal fricative [h]	maaf	/maaf/	[maah]	'sorry'
Final coda /s/	≙	Glottal fricative [h]	panas	/panas/	[panah]	'hot'
Initial, mid and final /r/	≙	Velar fricative [ɣ]	reban	/rəban/	[ɣəbɛ̃]	'coop'
Coda /r/	≙	Omitted	permata	/pərmata/	[pəmatɔ]	'jewellery'
Final coda /l/	≙	Omitted	tinggal	/tiŋɡal/	[tiŋɡa]	'leave'
Final coda /p/	≙	Glottal stop [ʔ]	letup	/lətup/	[lətuʔ]	'to explode'
Final coda /t/	≙	Glottal stop [ʔ]	sesat	/səsat/	[səsaʔ]	'lost'
Final coda /k/	≙	Glottal stop [ʔ]	masak	/masak/	[masɔʔ]	'to cook'
Final coda /m/ and /n/ after non-a vowel	≙	Velar nasal [ŋ]	mungkin	/muŋkin/	[mũkiŋ]	'maybe'
Initial and mid /t͡ʃ/	≙	Voiceless palatal plosive [c]	cuci	/t͡ʃut͡ʃi/	[cuci]	'to wash'
Initial and mid /d͡ʒ/	≙	Voiced palatal plosive [ɟ]	jalan	/d͡ʒalan/	[ɟalɛ̃]	'path'

=== Vocabulary ===
Basic Words
Kelantan–Pattani Malay	Standard Malay	English Translation
jamah	pegang	'to hold'
goba	risau	'worried'
ghohok	susah	'difficult'
getek	juga	'too'
kekoh	gigit	'to bite'
kelorek	kedekut	'greedy'
kesit	sunyi	'quiet'
tubik	keluar	'exit/out'
mmupo	mandi sungai	'river bathing'
nnate	binatang	'animal'
gege	bising	'noisy'
petong	baling	'to throw'
ggapo	apa	'what'
dok	bukan	'not'
betak	kenyang	'full'

Note(s):

- The spelling used for the Kelantan–Pattani Malay words is a pronunciation respelling.

Speakers in the Pattani region are also noted to use loans directly from Thai such as tahang "army" from ทหาร RTGS: tá-hǎan, torosak "telephone" from โทรศัพท์ RTGS: toorá-sàp and besek "receipt" from ใบเสร็จ RTGS: bai-set.

== Phonology ==
There are 21 consonants and 12 vowels in Pattani Malay..

=== Consonants ===
		Bilabial	Alveolar	Palatal	Velar	Glottal
Nasal		m	n	ɲ	ŋ	
Plosive	voiceless	p	t	c͡ç	k	ʔ
Plosive	voiced	b	d	ɟ͡ʝ	ɡ	
Fricative	voiceless		s		x	h
Fricative	voiced		(z)		ɣ	
Semivowel		w		j		
Lateral			l			
Trill			(r)			

Notes(s):

- the palatal stops has been identified as palatal plosives [c, ɟ] according to Nawanit (1993), palatal affricates [c͡ç, ɟ͡ʝ] according to Wu (2023), and post alveolar affricates [t͡ʃ, dʒ]
- /x/ is inherently geminated and can only occur at the front of the word like 'kkijo' [xːiɟ͡ʝɔ] "to work" and 'kketah' [xːətah] "paper", some speakers may merge the phoneme with [kː]
- The phonemes /r/ and /z/ only appear in some loanwords or proper names with [r] usually merging with [ɣ] and [z] merging with [ɟ͡ʝ]
- /t/ is more pronounced as a voiceless dental plosive [t̪] rather than an alveolar one (Wu, 2023)

=== Vowels ===
Nawawit (1986)
	Front		Central		Back	
	oral	nasal	oral	nasal	oral	nasal
High	i		ɨ		u	ũ
Mid	e				o	
Low	ɛ	ɛ̃	a	ã	ɔ	ɔ̃

Adi Yasran (2010), Teoh (1994)
	Front	Central	Back
High	i		u
Mid	e	ə	o
Low		a	

Wu (2023)
	Front		Central		Back	
	oral	nasal	oral	nasal	oral	nasal
High	i				u	ũ
Mid-high	e				o	
Mid-low	ɛ	ɛ̃	ə		ɔ	ɔ̃
Low			a	ã		

Note(s):

- The close central unrounded vowel /ɨ/ is believed to actually be a schwa /ə/ according to Teoh (1994), Adi Yasran (2005) and Wu (2023).
- Before a final /k/ and final /h/ coda and in open-ended words, /a/ is pronounced as:
  - Open-mid back rounded [ɔ] according to Nawanit (1989) and Wu (2023) across his work; exp. mata > /matɔ/ 'eyes', masak > /masɔʔ/ 'ripe' (the one used from hereon throughout the page).
  - Open back unrounded [ɑ] according to Adi Yasran (2006, 2010) and Zaharani (2006).
  - Near-open central [ɐ] according to Teoh (1984).
- Many such as Adi Yasran (2010) and Teoh and Yeoh (1988) believe that the nasal vowels of Kelantan–Pattani Malay do not count as phonemes, yet Wu (2023) distinguishes it as separate phonemes.

=== Gemination ===
Gemination occurs for various purposes and in various forms in Kelantan-Pattani Malay. At the phonemic level, these geminations are transcribed as /CC/ but they are pronounced as [Cː] so /dd/ is pronounced as [dː].

==== Initial syllable reduction ====
These geminations are derived by deleting the initial syllable and replacing it with a geminated form of the initial consonant of the remaining word.

- From simple words
  - betina /bətina/ > /ttina/ [tːinɔ] 'woman'
  - buwi /buwi/ > /wwi/ [wːi] 'to give'
- From prefixed words
  - berjalan /bərɟalan/ > /ɟɟalan/ [ɟːalɛ̃] 'to walk'
  - berdiri /bərdiri/ > /ddiri/ [dːiɣi] 'to stand up'

==== Initial morpheme reduction ====
These geminates are derived by deleting the initial morpheme of a reduplicated word and replacing it with a geminated form of the remaining morpheme. Unlike the geminations acquired from initial syllable reduction, these geminates are not free variants of their Standard Malay counterparts.

- From the reduplicated form of a word
  - baik-baik /baik baik/ > /bbaik/ [bːaiʔ] 'well'
  - molek-molek /molek molek/ > /mmolek/ [mːɔlɛʔ] 'properly'
- From words that are reduplications of a single word
  - layang-layang /lajaŋ lajaŋ/ > /llajaŋ/ [lːajɛ̃] 'kite'
  - kura-kura /kura kura/ > /kkura/ [kːuɣɔ] 'tortoise'

==== Functional word reduction ====
In this situation, a word with a function is deleted and the word afterwards is geminated. This sort of gemination is a free variant of its Standard Malay counterpart.

- From a verbal linker
  - basuh buwi cuci /basuh buwi cuci/ > /basuh ccuci/ [basuh cːuci] 'to wash clean'
  - taruh buwi panjang /taruh buwi paɲɟaŋ/ > /taruh ppaɲɟaŋ/ [taɣuh pːaɲɟɛ̃] 'to keep something so it'll grow long'
- From preposition reduction
  - ke darat /kə darat/ > /ddarat/ [dːaɣaʔ] 'to/at/from the shore'
  - sejak pagi /səɟak paɡi/ > /ppaɡɡi/ [pːaɡi] 'since the morning'

==== Loanwords ====
Many loanwords tend to have initial geminated consonants too.

- tar /tar/ > /ttar/ [tːa] 'tar'

=== Stress ===
Kelantan–Pattani Malay has a set of stress rules that is quite different to that of Standard Malay.

==== Words with initial simple consonants ====
Generally, in Kelantan–Pattani Malay, the primary stress falls on the last syllable if the word starts with a single consonant.

- nak /nak/ > [ˈnɔ̃ʔ] 'to want'
- dalam /dalam/ > [ˌdaˈlɛ̃] 'in'
- gelisah /ɡəlisah/ > [ɡəˌliˈsɔh] 'restless'

However, in words with more than one syllable, syllables with a schwa /ə/ are unstressed.

- petang /pətaŋ/ > [pəˈtɛ̃] 'afternoon'
- belakang /bəlakaŋ/ > [bəˌlaˈkɛ̃] 'back'

Syllables that do not have the schwa and are not in the word-final position take the secondary stress.

- jalan /ɟalan/ > [ˌɟaˈlɛ̃] 'path'
- makanan /makanan/ > [ˌmãˌkɛˈnɛ̃] 'food'

==== Words with geminated consonants ====
If a word has an initial syllable with a geminated consonant, that syllable automatically takes the primary stress.

- berjalan /bərɟalan/ > /ɟɟalan/ [ˈɟːaˌlɛ̃] 'to walk'
- ke darat /kə darat/ > /ddarat/ [ˈdːaˌɣaʔ] 'to/at/from the shore'
