= Kuala Lipis railway station =

Rail station in Malaysia

Coordinates: 4°11′13″N 102°03′11″E

Kuala Lipis

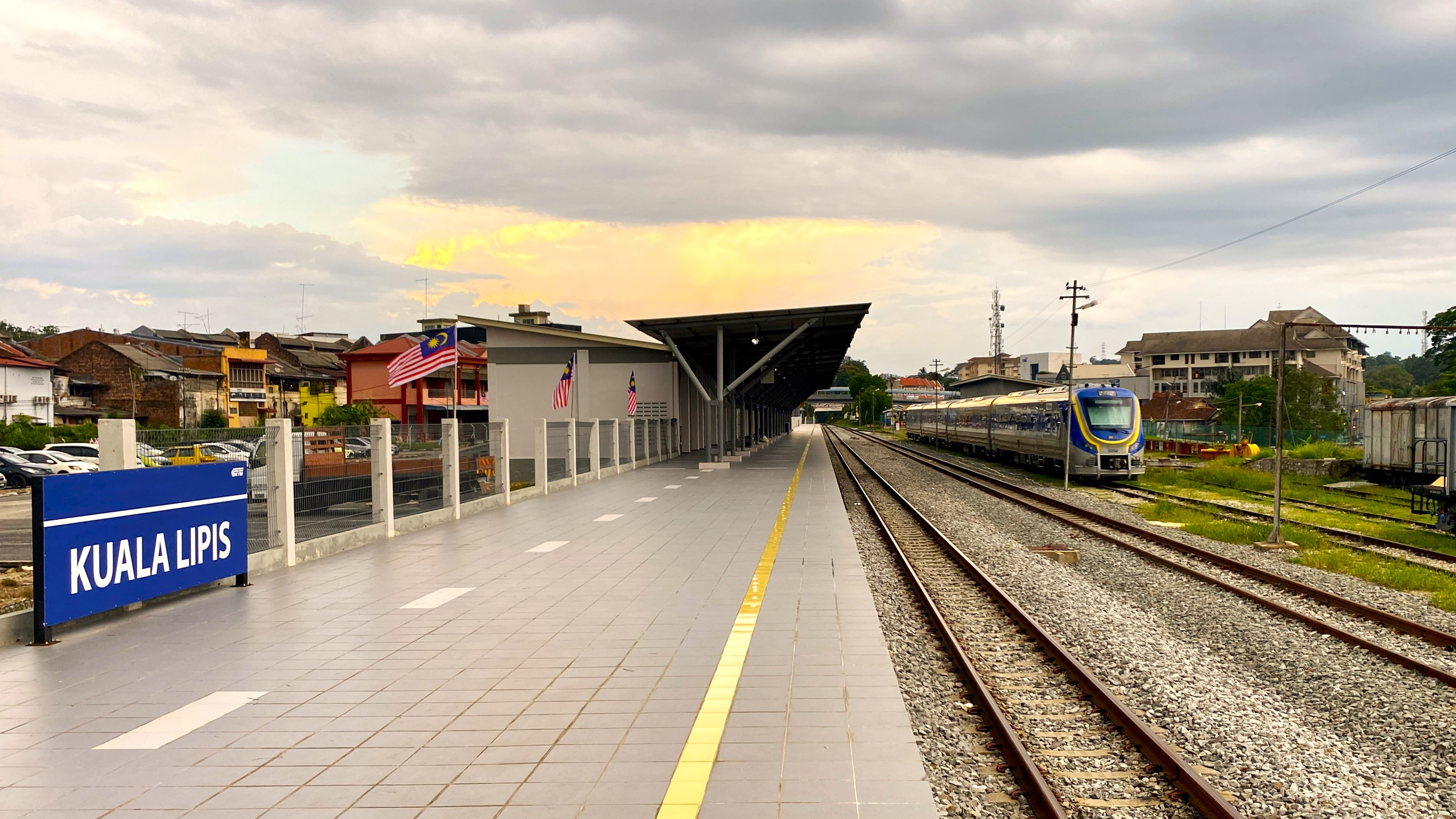
- Platform of the new Kuala Lipis Railway Station.

General information
- Other names: Malay: کوالا ليڤيس (Jawi); Chinese: 瓜拉立卑; Tamil: கோலா லிப்பிஸ்
- Location: Kuala Lipis, Lipis District; Pahang; Malaysia
- Owner: Railway Assets Corporation
- Operator: Keretapi Tanah Melayu
- Line: East Coast Line
- Platforms: 1 side platform 1 island platform
- Tracks: 3
- Connections: Pahang Lin Siong Bus

Construction
- Structure type: At-grade
- Platform levels: 2
- Parking: Available, free.
- Accessible: Yes

History
- Opened: 1917

Services
Preceding station	Keretapi Tanah Melayu (Intercity)	Following station
Merapoh towards Tumpat	Ekspres Rakyat Timuran	Kerambit towards Johor Bahru Sentral
Padang Tengku towards Tumpat	Shuttle Timur	Terminus
Padang Tengku towards Gua Musang	Shuttle Timur	Terminus
Terminus	Shuttle Timur	Kerambit towards Gemas
Location

The Kuala Lipis railway station is a Malaysian train station located at and named after the town of Kuala Lipis in the Lipis District of the state of Pahang.

It is a major stop; shuttle trains to Tumpat, Gua Musang and Gemas start here.

== Train services ==
The station is served by the following KTM Intercity services:

- Ekspres Rakyat Timuran 26/27 Tumpat–JB Sentral
- Shuttle Timur 30/31/34/35/38/39 Gemas–Kuala Lipis
- Shuttle Timur 51/60 Tumpat–Kuala Lipis
- Shuttle Timur 50/59 Gua Musang–Kuala Lipis

== Bus connection ==
Operator	Destinations	Time by tavel
Pahang Lin Siong	Jalan Pekeliling, Titiwangsa, Kuala Lumpur	3 hours
