= Ayutthaya =

Ayutthaya, Ayudhya, or Ayuthia may refer to:

- Ayutthaya Kingdom, a Thai kingdom that existed from 1350 to 1767
  - Ayutthaya Historical Park, the ruins of the old capital city of the Ayutthaya Kingdom
- Phra Nakhon Si Ayutthaya province (locally and simply Ayutthaya)
  - Phra Nakhon Si Ayutthaya district, the capital district
  - Phra Nakhon Si Ayutthaya (city), the city in Phra Nakhon Si Ayutthaya Province
- HTMS Sri Ayudhya, a ship of the Royal Thai Navy
- Si Ayutthaya Road, a road in downtown Bangkok
- Bank of Ayudhya, a Thai commercial bank
- Ayuthia (cicada), a genus of cicadas
- Ayutthaya United F.C., football club in Thailand
- Bang Pa-in Ayutthaya F.C., football club in Thailand

== See also ==
- Ayodhya (disambiguation), a city in Uttar Pradesh, India
- Ayothaya (disambiguation)
