= Tengku Hassanal Wildlife Reserve =

Malaysian protected area

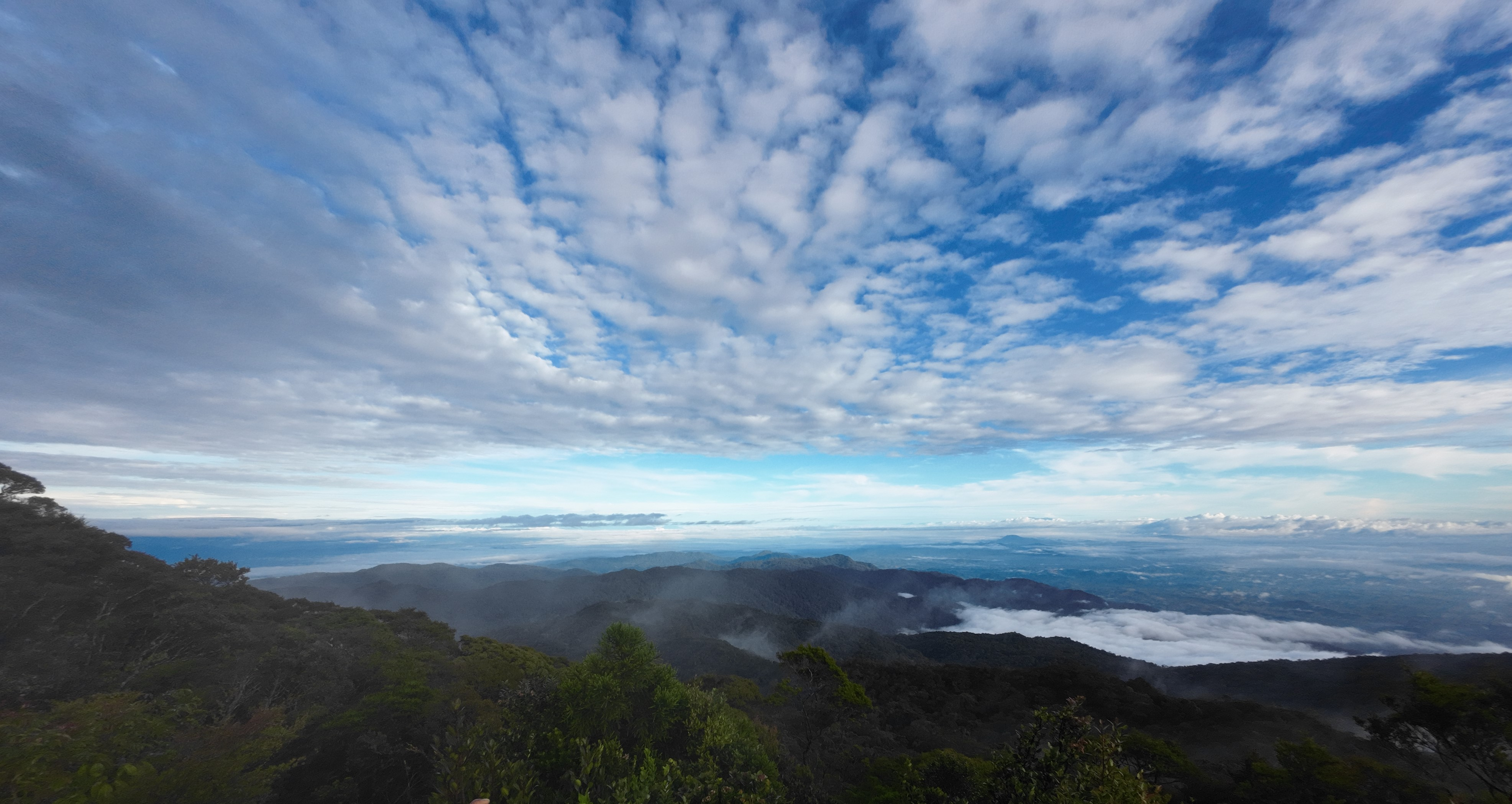
- Interactive map of Tengku Hassanal Wildlife Reserve
- Nearest city: Temerloh
- Coordinates: 3°43′N 102°10′E
- Area: 60,552 ha (233.79 sq mi)
- Authorized: June 1923; 103 years ago
- Governing body: Department of Wildlife and National Parks

Tengku Hassanal Wildlife Reserve is one of the largest wildlife reserves in Peninsular Malaysia covering 605.52 km^{2} located in the Titiwangsa Mountains, central state of Pahang, Malaysia that was established during the British Colonial Administration. It was officially gazetted to protect all wildlife species, particularly the gaur (Bos gaurus). The administrative offices of the reserve are located in several places. The main office is located in Bukit Rengit (southern side), and the other stations are in Lembah Klau (western side), Kuala Lompat (eastern side), and Perlok (northern side).

The lowland dipterocarp forest area contains a very high diversity of birds and mammals, especially primates and bats. There are a few Wildlife Conservation Centers managed by PERHILITAN in the close vicinity of the reserve. Mainly, Malayan Tiger Conservation Center, Kuala Gandah Elephant Conservation Centre, and Pusat Konservasi Jenderak Selatan. Among the birdlife, the rare Malayan peacock-pheasant is still found in the reserve in some numbers.

In the 1960s, Lord Medway led a zoological expedition to Gunong Benom (2,107 m asl) which later attracted many scholars, biologists, and primatologists to research the western part of the reserve called Kuala Krau research station.

== History of Establishment ==
Krau Game Reserve was established in June 1923 under Wild Animals and Bird Protection Enactment following growing public concerns for the conservation of wildlife and human-wildlife conflicts amid clearing of forested area to make way for the rubber industry.

The name Krau Game Reserve was changed to Krau Wildlife Reserve in 1965. The administration of the Reserve was passed from Pahang State Game Department to the Federal Game Department in 1973. Federal Game Department then changed to the Department of Wildlife and National Parks in 1976. In November 2022, the name Tengku Hassanal Wildlife Reserve (THWR) was officially enacted to champion the crown prince of Pahang which is KDYMM Tengku Hassanal Ibrahim Alam Shah as its protector. The size of Tengku Hassanal Wildlife Reserve has been reconstituted a few times, and the latest area size is 60,551.608 hectares.

== Geography ==
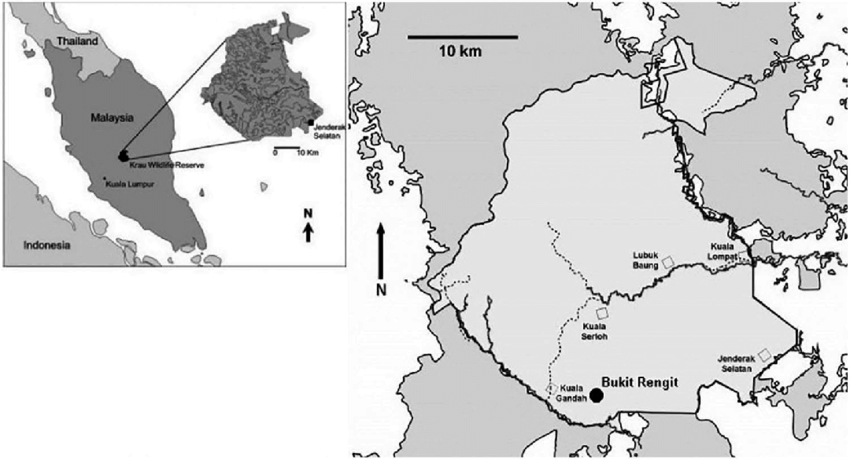
Map of Krau Wildlife Reserve

Tengku Hassanal Wildlife Reserve is located at 3°42'57.89" N 102°10'33.60" E, in the state of Pahang and in the center of Peninsular Malaysia. The Reserve is approximately 167 km from Kuantan, the capital state of Pahang, and 109 km from Kuala Lumpur, the capital city of Malaysia.

The Reserve is located in three districts in Pahang, which are Temerloh, Jerantut, and Raub. Where the largest geographical space of Krau Wildlife Reserve is within the Temerloh district.

Altitude in the reserve ranges between 43 meters at Kuala Lompat to 2,107 meters above sea level at the peak of Gunung Benom and is drained by Krau River, Lompat River, and Teris River.

The Reserve consists of sedimentary rocks (Semantan formation and post-Semantan redbeds), igneous rock (Benom Complex), and Quaternary sediments. On the northern and western parts of Tengku Hassanal Wildlife Reserve, igneous rocks are more exposed, while from the northeast to the southern part of the Reserve, the sedimentary rocks are more abundant. The Benom Complex mainly dominates the center of the reserve.

== Forest Types ==
There are five major different forest types with their own subtypes that are acknowledged in Tengku Hassanal Wildlife Reserve. About 61% of the forest area in the reserve is the Lowland Dipterocarp forest. The second largest forest type in the reserve is Hill Dipterocarp. While Montane Forest is the third largest forest type. The remaining forest type is disturbed secondary vegetation and cultivated areas.

== Flora and Fauna ==
All major forest types in Tengku Hassanal Wildlife Reserve are high with conservation values. Especially in the hills and lower montane forests. The majority of the area is still covered by lowland dipterocarp forests, and the vast areas of high altitude along the Gunung Benom are still pristine. Among endangered flora species in Tengku Hassanal Wildlife Reserve are Kibatalia laurifolia sp. and Phlegmariurus phyllanthus sp.

Tengku Hassanal Wildlife Reserve is home to a high number of wildlife species. There are about 655 wildlife species comprising 292 avian species, 65 amphibian species, 79 reptile species, 71 bat species, 79 mammal species, and 69 fish species.

Of the 655 fauna species, 322 are totally protected, and 70 are protected under the Wildlife Conservation Act 2010 (Act 716) and Fisheries Act 1985 (Act 317). Moreover, five species are listed as critically endangered, 16 as endangered, 33 as vulnerable, and 486 as least concerned. Among the endangered and critically endangered species that still can be observed in the Reserve are Malayan Tiger (Panthera tigris jacksoni), Flat-headed Cat (Prionailurus planiceps), Dhole (Cuon alpinus), Sunda Pangolin (Manis javanica), White-crowned Hornbill (Berenicornis comatus), Storm's Stork (Ciconia stormi), Spiny Turtle (Heosemys spinosa), Otter Civet (Cynogale bennettii), Dusky Leaf Monkey (Trachypithecus obscurus), Sunda Slow Loris (Nycticebus coucang), and Malayan Tapir (Tapirus indicus).

== Local Community ==
Around 36 villages are surrounding and within the Reserve. Population data from three administrative districts and 10 sub-districts surrounding the Tengku Hassanal Wildlife Reserve shows that there is an increase in the population of over 133, 000 individuals since 1991. The dominant indigenous communities of THWR are Jah Hut and Cheq Wong, who predominantly live in Mukim Jenderak, east of the reserve.

Conclusively, there are 10 indigenous people villages within and surrounding the Reserve namely Kg. Seboi, Kg. Pian, Kg. Penderas, Kg. Paya Mendoi, Kg. Paya Rekoh, Kg. Paya Pelong, Kg. Lubuk Wong, Kg. Kuala Terboi, Kg. Berdut, and Kg. Pasu. As for other communities, there are several settlements near the borders of THWR. To name a few, the villagers are Kg. Bolok Hulu and Hilir, located in the south of the reserve, Kg. Ulu Cheka, Kg. Damak, Kg. Tengah, Kg. Perlok, Kg. Pekan Sehari, and Kg. Tanjung Puteri, located in the northeast of the Reserve; and Felda Lembah Klau, located in the west of the Reserve.

All these villages are located within 15 km of THWR. The PERHILITAN under the Biodiversity Protection and Patrolling Program (BP3) hires some of the local indigenous community as part of its conservation efforts and to highlight the importance of these community as the guardian of the forest.

== Ecotourism ==
The abundance of interesting features such as scenic mountains and hills peaks, beautiful rivers and waterfalls, and a culturally rich local community can be the catalyst for the Reserve to be an eco-tourism hub for both local and international guests. Even though, the reserve itself is not fully open to tourists. There are several interesting locals that can be visited. This place is including and is not limited to:

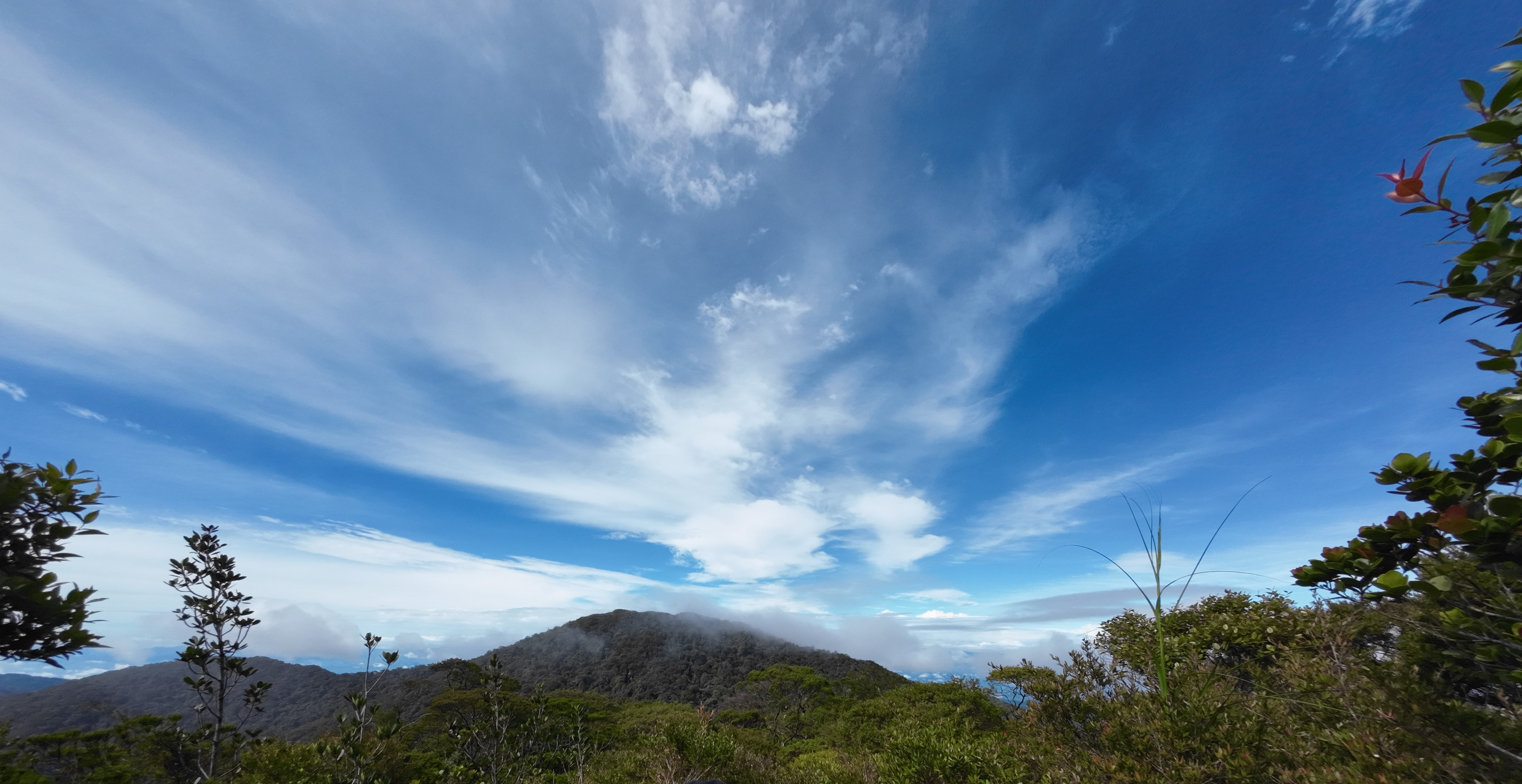
View from the Peak of Gunung Benom

- Gunung Benom is the second-highest mountain in the state of Pahang and the ninth-highest mountain in peninsular Malaysia with an altitude of 2,107 meters above sea level.
- Lata Bujang Waterfall is a seven tiers waterfall with just less than an hour of trekking from the nearest access point.
- Gunung Tungku
- Bukit Bongkok

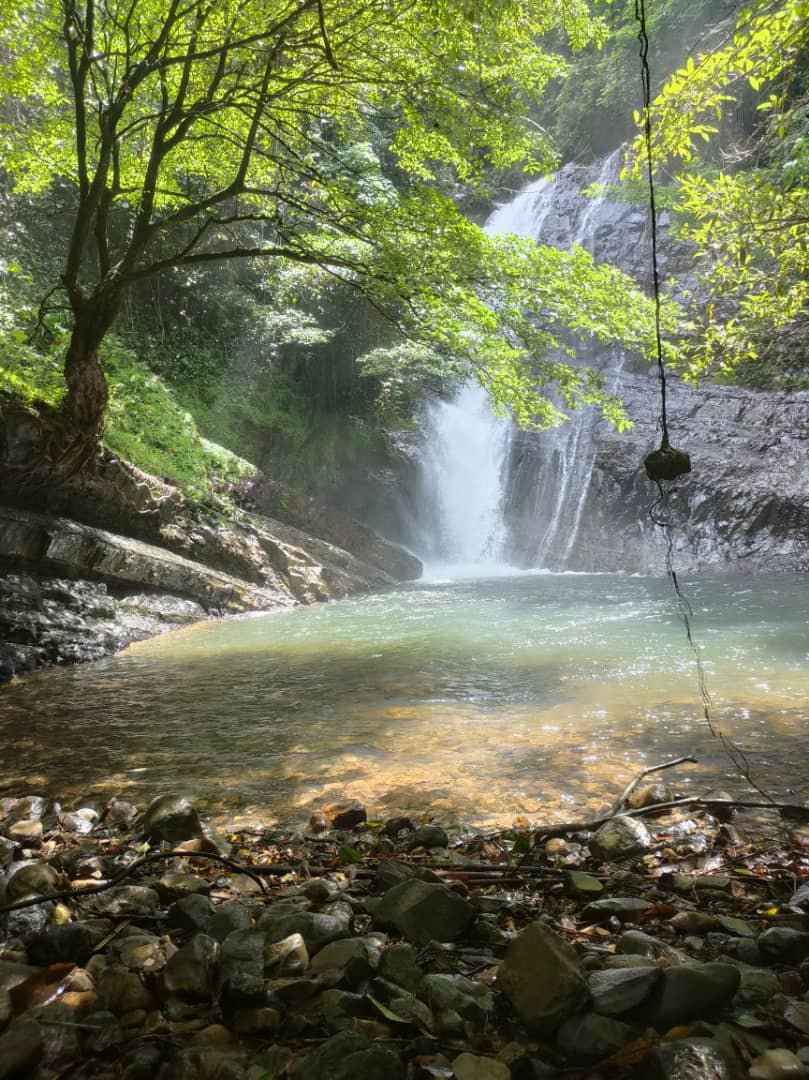
Lata Sebarau in the Tengku Hassanal Wildlife Reserve

- Lata Sebarau
- Kuala Gandah Elephant Conservation Centre is one of the Wildlife Conservation Centers that are near the vicinity of the reserve. Located in the southern part of the reserve. It's free to visit with various activities with elephants that can be experienced.

== See also ==
- List of national parks in Malaysia
- Malaysian Wildlife Law

== Bibliography ==
- Krau Wildlife Reserve Management Plan. 2001. Perhilitan and DANCED.
- Marie Cambon, Damian Harper, Eddin Khoo. Lonely Planet : Malaysia, Singapore & Brunei.
- Joshua Eliot, Jane Bickersteth. Footprint Malaysia Handbook.
- Jaclyn H Wolfheim. Primates of the World: Distribution, Abundance and Conservation.
- D S Edwards, W E Booth, S C Choy. Tropical Rainforest Research- Current Issues: Proceedings of the Conference.
