= Malaysia Federal Route 236 =

Road in Malaysia

Federal Route 236
- Jalan Lanchang

Route information
- Maintained by Malaysian Public Works Department
- Length: 14.03 km (8.72 mi)

Major junctions
- Northwest end: Hulu Teris
- FT 1500 Jalan Bolok-Mempaga East Coast Expressway / AH141; C115 Jalan Teris; FT 2 Federal Route 2
- Southeast end: Lanchang

Location
- Country: Malaysia
- Primary destinations: Cempaka

Highway system
- Highways in Malaysia; Expressways; Federal; State

Jalan Lanchang, Federal Route 236 (formerly Pahang State Route C118), is a federal road in Pahang, Malaysia. It is also a main route to East Coast Expressway via Lanchang Interchange.

== Features ==
At most sections, the Federal Route 236 was built under the JKR R5 road standard, allowing maximum speed limit of up to 90 km/h.

== Junction lists ==
The entire route is located in Temerloh District, Pahang.

Legend:

- I/C - Interchange, I/S - Intersection, RSA - Rest and service area, OBR - Overhead bridge restaurant, R/R - Restaurant and rest plaza, L/B - Layby, V/P - Vista point, TN - tunnel, T/P - Toll plaza, BR - Bridge
- C - Cloverleaf, S - Stack, T-A - Trumpet-A, T-B - Trumpet-B, DT - Directional-T/Y, SDT - Semi-Directional-T/Y, P-Y - Partial-Y, D - Diamond, P-C - Partial cloverleaf, D-D - Diverging diamond, D-R - Direct ramp

Location	km	mi	Name	Destinations	Notes
Lanchang			Hulu Teris		
Lanchang			Kuala Gandah Elephant Conservation Centre	Kuala Gandah Elephant Conservation Centre – Visitor centre, Elephant sanctuary	
Lanchang			Kuala Gandah Orang Asli Village		
Lanchang			Jalan Kuala Gandah	Jalan Kuala Gandah – Kuala Gandah, Kuala Gandah Deerland, National Biology Conservation Training Centre	T-junctions
Lanchang			Kampung Bolok		
Lanchang			Kampung Bolok Hilir		
Lanchang			Jalan Bolok–Mempaga	FT 1500 Jalan Bolok–Mempaga – FELDA Lakum, FELDA Mempaga, Raub, Kuala Lipis	T-junctions
Lanchang			Kampung Cempaka	Kampung Cempaka, Kampung Cempaka Kiri, Kampung Cempaka Kanan	Junctions
Lanchang			Lanchang-ECE	East Coast Expressway / AH141 – Kuala Lumpur, Bentong, Karak, Temerloh, Kuantan, Kuala Terengganu	T-junctions
Lanchang			Jalan Teris	C115 Jalan Teris – Kampung Teris	T-junctions
Lanchang			Kampung Sendayan-Kampung Mempatih	Kampung Sendayan, Kampung Mempatih	
Lanchang			Sungai Semantan bridge		
Lanchang			Kampung Lanar		
Lanchang			Lanchang	FT 2 Malaysia Federal Route 2 – Kuala Lumpur, Bentong, Karak, Mentakab, Temerloh, Kuantan	T-junctions
1.000 mi = 1.609 km; 1.000 km = 0.621 mi
