= Jalan Mempaga =

Road in Malaysia

Federal Route 1498
- Jalan Mempaga

Route information
- Maintained by Malaysian Public Works Department

Major junctions
- Northwest end: Kampung Asap
- FT 8 Federal Route 8 (1500) Jalan Bolok–Mempaga; C124 Jalan Lakum; East Coast Expressway FT 2 Karak Expressway; East Coast Expressway East Coast Expressway; FT 2 Federal route 2
- Southeast end: Karak Interchange; East Coast Expressway FT 2 Karak Expressway; East Coast Expressway East Coast Expressway

Location
- Country: Malaysia
- Primary destinations: Kampung Lebu; FELDA Mempaga; FELDA Lakum; Kampung Sertik; Kampung Cinta Manis

Highway system
- Highways in Malaysia; Expressways; Federal; State

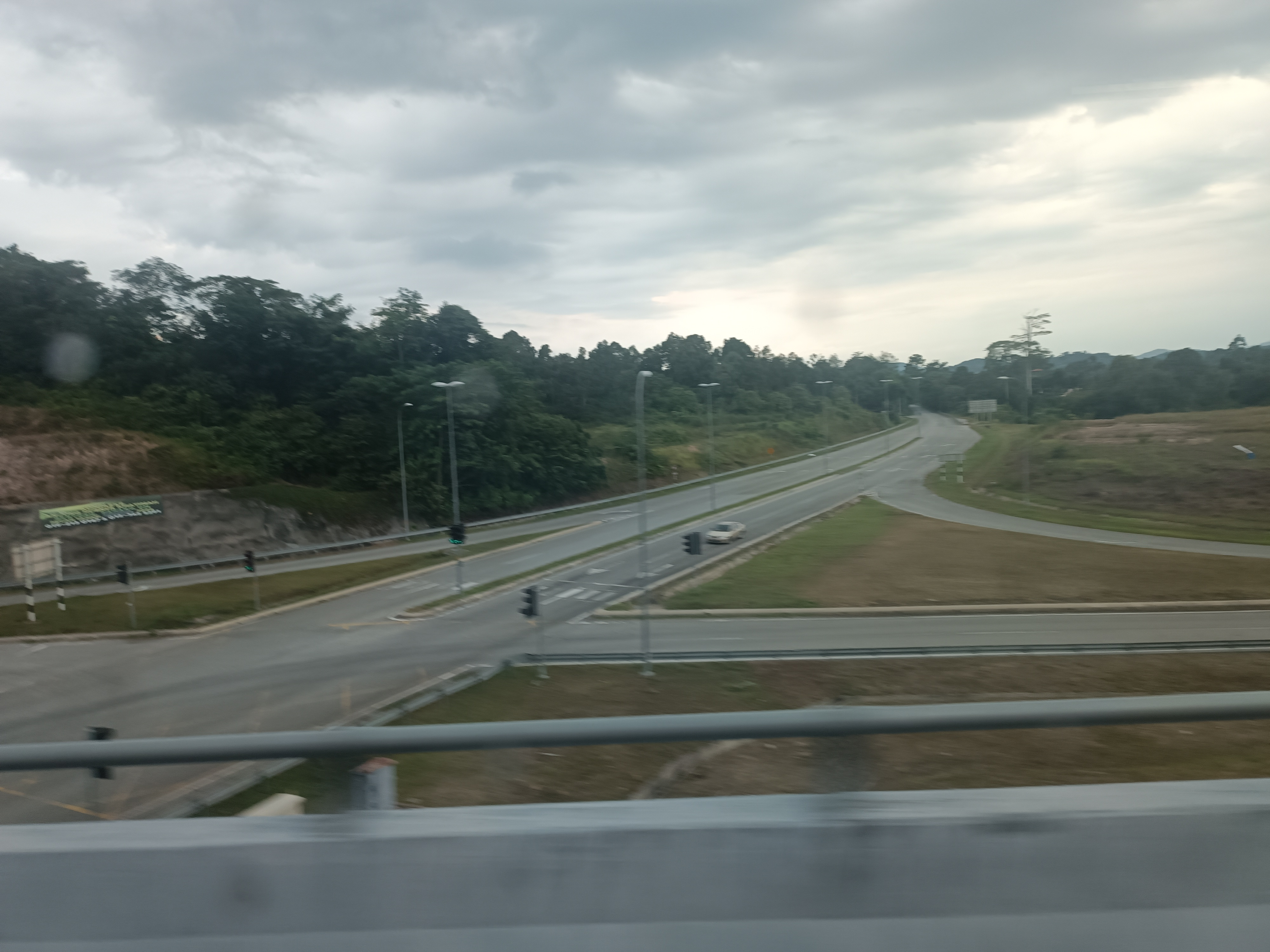
Jalan Mempaga

Jalan Mempaga, Federal Route 1498 (formerly Pahang state route C138), is a federal road in Pahang, Malaysia.

At most sections, the Federal Route 1498 was built under the JKR R5 road standard, with a speed limit of 90 km/h.

== List of junctions ==
| Km | Exit | Junctions | To | Remarks |
|---|---|---|---|---|
| | | Kampung Asap | North; FT 8 Raub; FT 8 Benta; FT 8 Kuala Lipis South; FT 8 Bentong; East Coast Expressway Karak Expressway; Kuala Lumpur; Kuantan | T-junctions |
| | | Kampung Keruntong | | |
| | | Kampung Lebu | | |
| | | Kampung Hulu Lebu | | |
| | | Jalan Sungai Ruan | Northeast; C149 Jalan Sungai Ruan; Sungai Ruan; FELDA Klau 2 | T-junctions |
| | | FELDA Mempaga 1 | | |
| | | Pusat Serenti Mempaga | | |
| | | Jalan Lakum | East; FT 1500 (1500) Jalan Bolok–Mempaga; FELDA Lakum; Lanchang | T-junctions |
| | | Jalan Sertik | North; C124 Jalan Sertik; FELDA Sertik | T-junctions |
| | | Kampung Cinta Manis | | |
| | | Sungai Bentong bridge | | |
| | | Karak-ECE | see also 813 Karak Interchange | Interchange |
