= Jalan Bolok–Mempaga =

Road in Malaysia

Federal Route 1500
- Jalan Bolok–Mempaga

Route information
- Maintained by Malaysian Public Works Department

Major junctions
- Northwest end: FELDA Mempaga
- FT 1496 Jalan Mempaga; FT 236 Jalan Mempaga
- Southeast end: Kampung Bolok

Location
- Country: Malaysia
- Primary destinations: FELDA Lakum; FELDA Bukit Damar; Lanchang

Highway system
- Highways in Malaysia; Expressways; Federal; State

Jalan Bolok–Mempaga, Federal Route 1500 (formerly Pahang state route C124), is a federal road in Pahang, Malaysia.

At most sections, the Federal Route 1500 was built under the JKR R5 road standard, allowing maximum speed limit of up to 90 km/h.

As of 31 December 2022, it is considered one of the major federal roads in Pahang, and is 14,030 kilometres (8,720 mi) in length. It is restricted to weight class five, which does not allow vehicles with seven joint axles, or tankers, to travel along its route with any weight and is one of the three weight classes which allows travel for vehicles with five and six joint axles.

== List of junctions ==
Km	Exit	Junctions	To	Remarks
		FELDA Mempaga	FT 1429 Jalan Mempaga North; FELDA Mempaga; Bentong; Raub; Kuala Lipis South; Karak; East Coast Expressway FT 2 AH141 Kuala Lumpur–Karak Expressway; Kuala Lumpur; Kuantan	T-junctions
		Sungai Kelau bridge		
		Kampung Jemampung		
		Jalan Sertik	South; Jalan Sertik; FELDA Sertik	T-junctions
		FELDA Lakum		
		Sungai Jenalik bridge		
Bentong–Temerloh district border
		FELDA Bukit Damar		
		Kampung Orang Asli Bukit Damar		
		Kampung Bolok	FT 236 Jalan Lanchang North; Hulu Teris; Kampung Bolok; Kuala Gandah Conservation Centre South; Mempateh; Lanchang; East Coast Expressway AH141 East Coast Expressway; Kuala Lumpur; Kuantan	T-junctions
