= Tiger Protection Society of Malaysia =

Malaysian conservation group

Tiger Protection Society of Malaysia (RIMAU)
- Persatuan Pelindung Harimau Malaysia
- Abbreviation: RIMAU
- Formation: 2018; 8 years ago
- Type: Charity
- Registration no.: PPM-037-14-04092018
- Purpose: Environmentalism
- Location: Bukit Tunku, Kuala Lumpur, Malaysia
- Services: Wildlife protection, Lobbying, Research, Consultancy
- Website: https://rimau.ngo

Rimau, also known as the Tiger Protection Society of Malaysia (Malay: Persatuan Pelindung Harimau Malaysia, abbrev. RIMAU), is a non-governmental organisation in Malaysia dedicated to the conservation of the critically endangered Malayan tiger (Panthera tigris tigris), an national symbol found exclusively in Peninsular Malaysia and southern Thailand.

The Rimau headquarters is located at Bukit Tunku, Kuala Lumpur.

== History ==
Following the extinction of the Sumatran rhino, married documentary filmmakers Harun Rahman and Lara Ariffin feared that Malayan tigers would befall the same fate. In 2018, the couple set up Persatuan Pelindung Harimau Malaysia (RIMAU).

Initially Rimau was focused on raising awareness through initiatives like the documentary Malaysia's Last Tigers.

It primarily operates in Perak state, with major projects in areas like Royal Belum State Park, Amanjaya Forest Reserve, and Korbu Forest Reserve.

The Malayan tiger requires a minimum of 100 square kilometres of continuous forest to sustain its hunting and territorial range. Large, unbroken forest areas are therefore considered essential for the species's long-term survival. In Perak, key protected areas include the Belum-Temengor forest complex—encompassing the Royal Belum State Park—and the Bintang Hijau forest reserve, both of which constitute significant habitat for remaining Malayan tiger populations.

Harun Rahman, the project's lead, said in 2024, RIMAU is currently only focused on Perak: "There are several NGOs that are working in protecting tigers, such as World Wildlife Fund (WWF), Pelindung Alam Malaysia (PELINDUNG) and Malaysian Conservation Alliance for Tigers (MYCAT) in a few states like Pahang, Kelantan, parts of Perak as well as Terengganu, so there is no overlap even if we have the same mission."

== Conservation and anti-poaching initiatives ==
Rimau is involved in on-the-ground anti-poaching patrols, community empowerment, and collaborative conservation efforts. The organisation works with indigenous Orang Asli communities (particularly the Jahai), training and employing them as rangers to patrol key habitats, remove snares, and monitor wildlife.

Rimau anti-poaching programs include ranger training, public advocacy, and community awareness.

In collaboration with the Perak State Parks Corporation (PSPC) and other conservation partners, the organization facilitates the training and deployment of patrol rangers tasked with monitoring forest habitats and using standardized tiger management protocols. To maintain technical standards, Rimau partners with external environmental organizations, such as the World Wide Fund for Nature (WWF) and Pertubuhan Pelindung Alam Malaysia (Pelindung), to provide specialized field training for its personnel.

== Annual events ==
The Rimau 2025 Gala Event under the title Keep the roar alive marked the inaugural edition of an annual celebration held in Kuala Lumpur, Malaysia.

In July 2025, Rimau organized a two-day event in Gerik, Perak, to commemorate Global Tiger Day. The program included a public screening of the documentary Malaysia's Last Tigers and a community fair at Taman Inai featuring participation from government agencies, eco-tourism operators, and other non-governmental organizations. The initiative aimed to promote the Malayan tiger's survival as a critical component of forest preservation and national biodiversity.
