= Lan Chang =

Lan Chang (A Million Elephants) may refer to:

- Lan Xang, a kingdom in Laos 1353-1707
- Lan Chang Province, annexed by Thailand 1941-46

== See also ==
- Lanchang
