= Kuala Semantan (state constituency) =

Political subdivision in Malaysia

Kuala Semantan (N32)
Pahang constituency

State constituency
- Legislature: Pahang State Legislative Assembly
MLA
Hassanuddin Salim
PN
- Constituency created: 1959
- Constituency abolished: 1974
- Constituency re-created: 2003
- First contested: 1959
- Last contested: 2022

Demographics
- Population (2020): 51,290
- Electors (2022): 36,786

Kuala Semantan is a state constituency in Pahang, Malaysia, that is represented in the Pahang State Legislative Assembly.

== Demographics ==
Ethnic breakdown of Kuala Semantan's electorate as of 2022
1. Malay (78.9%)
2. Chinese (13.5%)
3. Other ethnicities (5.37%)
4. Indian (2.18%)

== History ==
=== Polling districts ===
According to the federal gazette issued on 30 March 2018, the Kuala Semantan constituency is divided into 15 polling districts.

State constituency	Polling district	Code	Location
Kuala Semantan (N32）	Sri Semantan	088/32/01	SK Mentakab Jaya
Kuala Semantan (N32）	Sanggang	088/32/02	SK Sanggang
Kuala Semantan (N32）	Songsang	088/32/03	Kolej Vokesional Temerloh
Kuala Semantan (N32）	Sanggang Seberang	088/32/04	SK Sanggang Seberang
Kuala Semantan (N32）	Kampung Gau	088/32/05	SK Sungai Gau
Kuala Semantan (N32）	Teluk Ira	088/32/06	SK Telok Ira
Kuala Semantan (N32）	Bangau	088/32/07	SK Bangau
Kuala Semantan (N32）	Bandar Temerloh	088/32/08	SJK (C) Khee Chee
Kuala Semantan (N32）	Kampung Batu	088/32/09	SMK Temerloh
Kuala Semantan (N32）	Jalan Bahagia	088/32/10	SK Jalan Bahagia
Kuala Semantan (N32）	Sri Bahagia	088/32/11	SMK Seri Bahagia
Kuala Semantan (N32）	Lubuk Pasu	088/32/12	SK Bandar Temerloh
Kuala Semantan (N32）	Tanjung Batu	088/32/13	SMK Seberang Temerloh
Kuala Semantan (N32）	Paya Pulai	088/32/14	SK Paya Pulai
Kuala Semantan (N32）	Lebak Seberang	088/32/15	Tabika Kemas Kampung Lebak Seberang

=== Representation history ===
Members of the Legislative Assembly for Kuala Semantan
Assembly	No	Years	Member	Party
Constituency created
1st	NN18	1959-1964	Awang Ngah Tok Muda Ibrahim	Alliance (UMNO)
2nd	NN18	1964-1969	Awang Ngah Tok Muda Ibrahim	Alliance (UMNO)
		1969-1971	Assembly dissolved	
3rd	N18	1971-1973	Awang Ngah Tok Muda Ibrahim	Alliance (UMNO)
3rd	N18	1973-1974	Awang Ngah Tok Muda Ibrahim	BN (UMNO)
Constituency abolished, split into Bandar Temerloh, Triang, Semantan, Bera and Mentakab
Constituency created from Semantan and Pelangai
11th	N32	2004-2008	Md. Hamdan Sudin	BN (UMNO)
12th	N32	2008-2013	Syed Hamid Syed Mohamed	PR (PAS)
13th	N32	2013-2015	Syed Hamid Syed Mohamed	PR (PAS)
13th	N32	2015-2018	Syed Hamid Syed Mohamed	AMANAH
14th	N32	2018-2022	Nor Azmi Mat Ludin	BN (UMNO)
15th	N32	2022–present	Hassanuddin Salim	PN (PAS)

== Election results ==
Pahang state election, 2022
Party	Candidate	Votes	%	∆%
PN	Hassanuddin Salim	12,386	42.45	▲42.45
BN	Nor Azmi Mat Ludin	10,648	36.49	▼0.37
PH	Azizul Shah Mohd Noor	5,918	20.28	▲20.28
PEJUANG	Mohd Syafiq Mohd Khaidir	225	0.77	▲0.77
Total valid votes		29,177	100.00	
Total rejected ballots		272		
Unreturned ballots		83		
Turnout		29,532	80.28	
Registered electors		36,786		
Majority		1,738	5.96	
PN gain from BN		Swing		?

Pahang state election, 2018
Party	Candidate	Votes	%	∆%
BN	Nor Azmi Mat Ludin	7,880	36.86	▼6.91
PAS	Hassanuddin Salim	7,406	34.64	▼21.60
PKR	Syed Hamid Syed Mohamed	6,095	28.51	▲28.51
Total valid votes		21,381	100.00	
Total rejected ballots		246		
Unreturned ballots		115		
Turnout		21,742	83.80	▼2.02
Registered electors		25,944		
Majority		474	2.22	▼10.26
BN gain from PAS		Swing		-

Pahang state election, 2013
Party	Candidate	Votes	%	∆%
PAS	Syed Hamid Syed Mohamed	12,101	56.24	▲3.20
BN	Mohammad Anuar Mohd. Yunus	9,416	43.76	▼3.20
Total valid votes		21,517	100.00	
Total rejected ballots		285		
Unreturned ballots		75		
Turnout		21,877	85.83	▲8.42
Registered electors		25,490		
Majority		2,685	12.48	▲6.40
PAS hold		Swing		

Pahang state election, 2008
Party	Candidate	Votes	%	∆%
PAS	Syed Hamid Syed Mohamed	8,136	53.04	▲8.49
BN	Mohd Khairuddin Abdul Manan	7,204	46.96	▼8.49
Total valid votes		15,340	100.00	
Total rejected ballots		267		
Unreturned ballots		108		
Turnout		15,715	77.40	▲1.18
Registered electors		20,303		
Majority		932	6.08	▼4.83
PAS gain from BN		Swing		-

Pahang state election, 2004
Party	Candidate	Votes	%	∆%
BN	Md Hamdan Sudin	7,421	55.45	▲55.45
PAS	Abdul Wahab Ismail	5,962	44.55	▲27.29
Total valid votes		13,383	100.00	
Total rejected ballots		272		
Unreturned ballots		228		
Turnout		13,883	76.22	
Registered electors		18,214		
Majority		1,459	10.90	
BN hold		Swing		-

Pahang state election, 1969
Party	Candidate	Votes	%	∆%
Alliance	Awang Ngah Tok Muda Ibrahim	1,873	49.21	▼5.91
Socialist Front	Zulkifly Mat Amin	1,276	33.53	▼11.35
PMIP	Abdul Moin Mohd Taib	657	17.26	▲17.26
Total valid votes		3,806	100.00	
Total rejected ballots		291		
Unreturned ballots		0		
Turnout		4,097	70.99	▼4.54
Registered electors		5,771		
Majority		597	15.69	▲5.44
Alliance hold		Swing		

Pahang state election, 1964
Party	Candidate	Votes	%	∆%
Alliance	Awang Ngah Tok Muda Ibrahim	1,894	55.12	▼0.02
Socialist Front	Zulkifly Mat Amin	1,542	44.88	▲19.29
Total valid votes		3,436	100.00	
Total rejected ballots		222		
Unreturned ballots		0		
Turnout		3,658	75.53	▲1.79
Registered electors		4,843		
Majority		352	10.24	▼19.31
Alliance hold		Swing		

Pahang state election, 1959
Party	Candidate	Votes	%
Alliance	Awang Ngah Tok Muda Ibrahim	1,431	55.14
Socialist Front	Jaafar Hussin	664	25.59
PMIP	Abdul Wahab Mohamed Zabidin	500	19.27
Total valid votes		2,595	100.00
Total rejected ballots		47	
Unreturned ballots		0	
Turnout		2,642	73.74
Registered electors		3,583	
Majority		767	29.56
This was a new constituency created.
