= Mount Benum =

Mountain in Malaysia

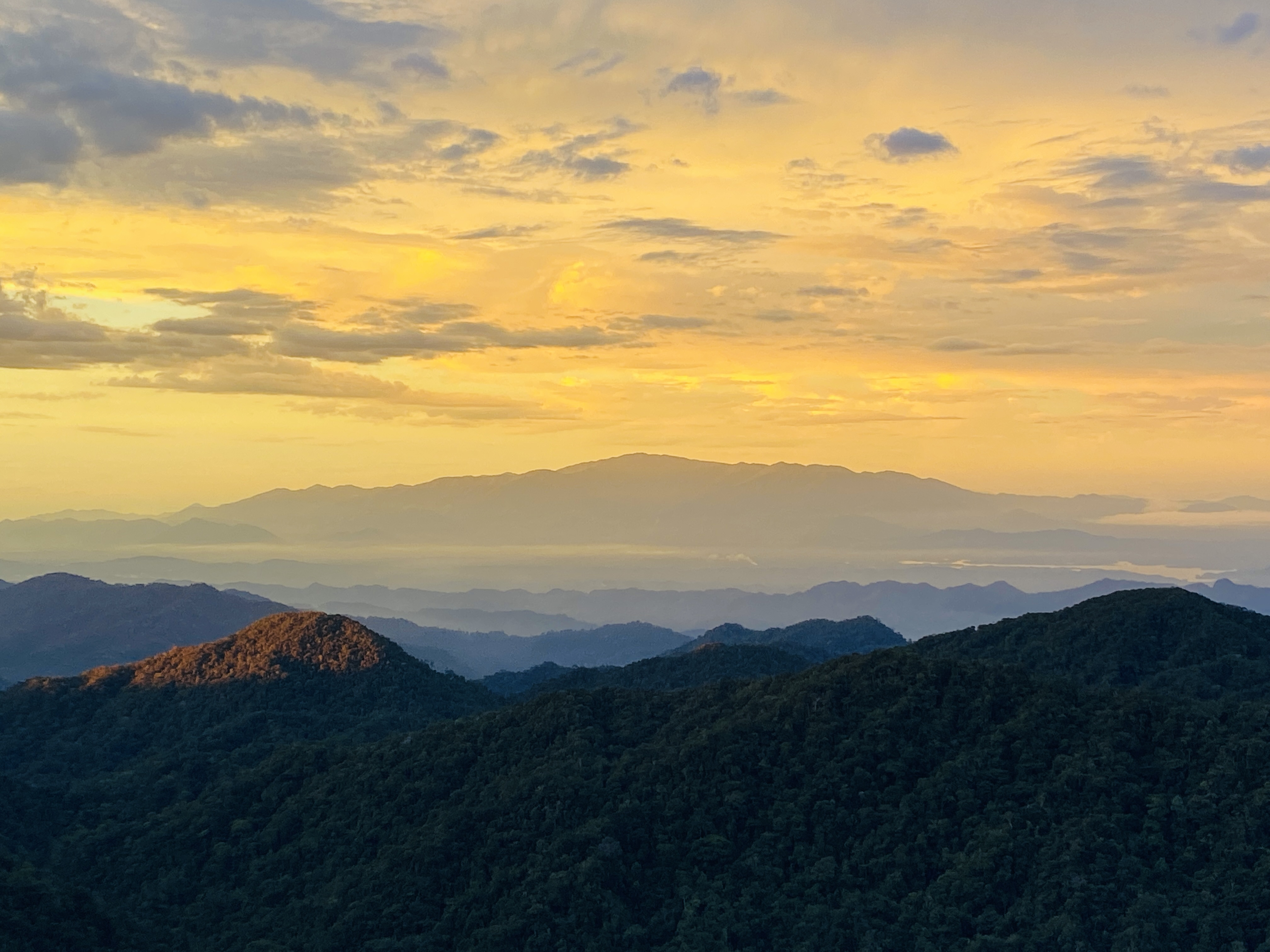
- Mount Benum at golden hour, seen from Genting Highlands

Highest point
- Elevation: 2,107 m (6,913 ft)
- Prominence: 1,950 m (6,400 ft)
- Listing: Ultra; Ribu
- Coordinates: 3°49′24″N 102°05′39″E

Naming
- Native name: Gunung Benum (Malay)

Geography
- Location within Malaysia
- Location: Temerloh, Raub and Jerantut Districts, Pahang
- Parent range: Benom Massif

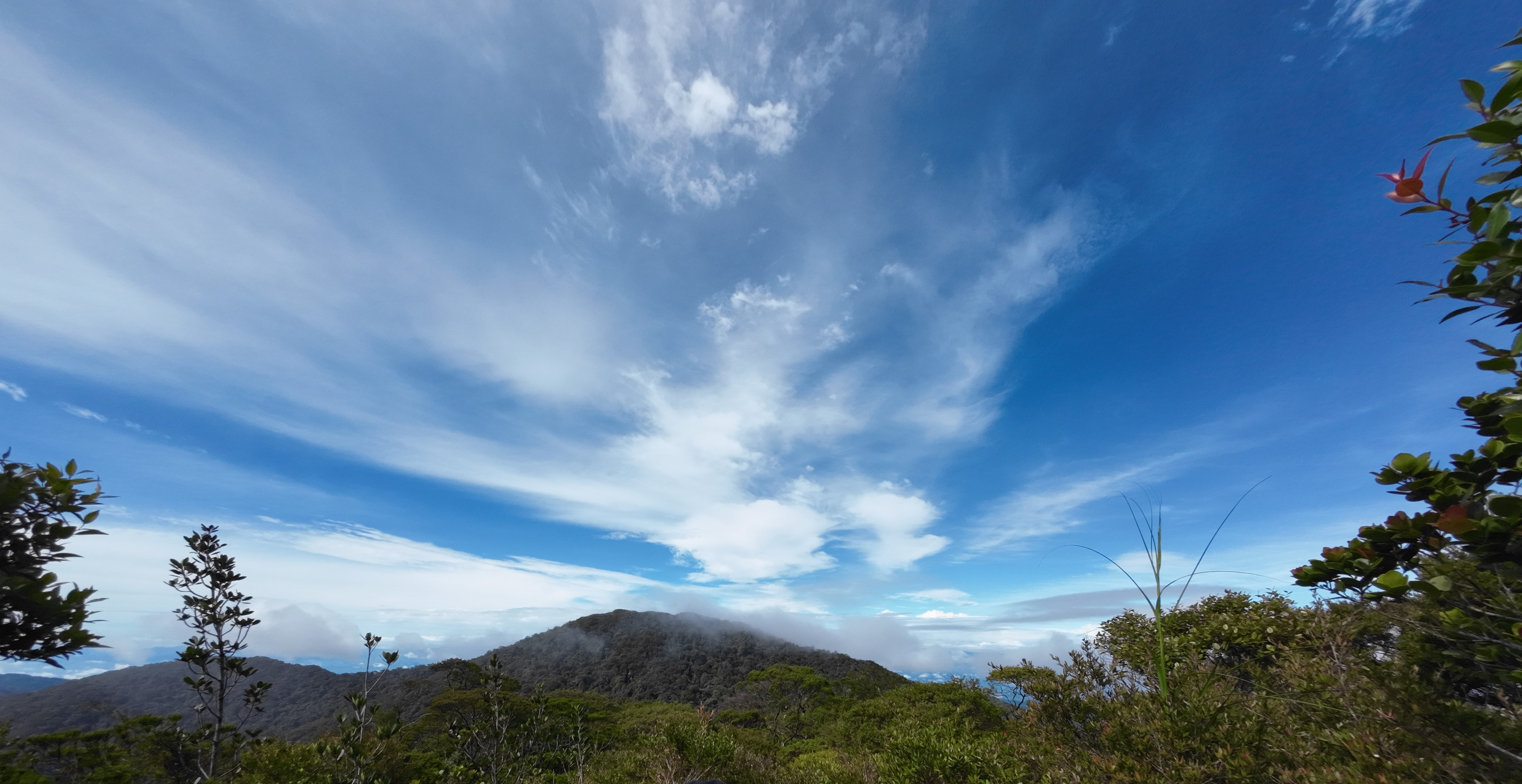
View from the summit

Mount Benum or Mount Benom (Malay: Gunung Benom) is a mountain in the state of Pahang in Malaysia. Its summit is 2,107 m (6,913 ft) above sea level. The mountain is located in a centre of an isolated massif east of the Titiwangsa Mountains.

== See also ==
- List of ultras of Southeast Asia
- List of mountains in Malaysia
- Jerantut
- Raub District
- Krau Wildlife Reserve
- Tenasserim Hills
