= Malaysian Conservation Alliance for Tigers =

Malaysian organization

Malaysian Conservation Alliance for Tigers (MYCAT)
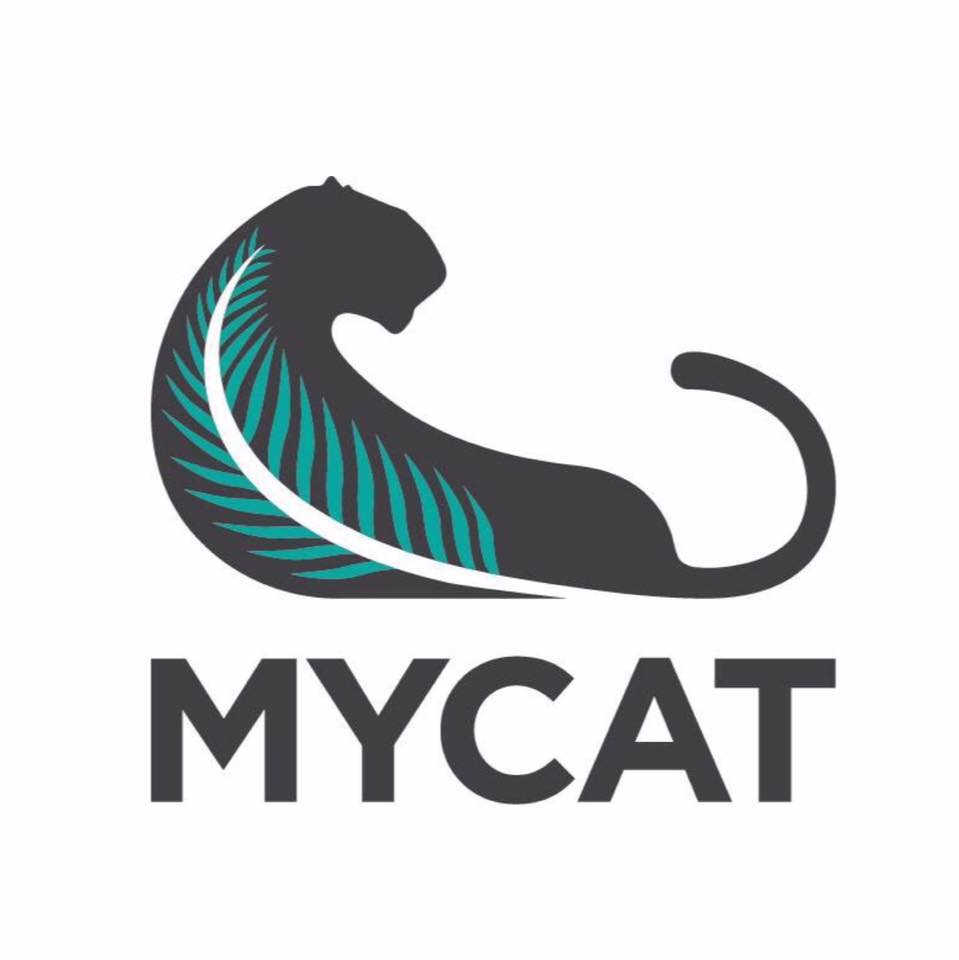
- Logo of MYCAT
- Founded: 2003; 23 years ago
- Purpose: Conservation of tigers
- Headquarters: T3-16-15, 3 Towers, Jalan Ampang, 50450 Kuala Lumpur, Malaysia
- Region served: Peninsular Malaysia
- Method: Protection, community outreach, partnership, advocacy, reforestation
- General Manager: Kae Kawanishi
- Website: mycat.my

The Malaysian Conservation Alliance for Tigers (MYCAT) is, according to the New Straits Times, "an alliance of non-governmental organisations comprising the Malaysian Nature Society (MNS), Traffic Southeast Asia, Wildlife Conservation Society-Malaysia Programme and WWF-Malaysia." It also includes the Department of Wildlife and National Parks.

They have estimated the number of tigers left in Malaysia to be between 250 and 340. In 2007, they implemented a hotline to report tiger-related crimes, such as poaching. In order to deter poaching, they organize "Cat Walks", a citizen patrol in danger zones. In 2009, they planned to double the tiger population from 500 to 1000 by 2020, but they called this goal "unachievable" in 2014.

== See also ==
- Malayan tiger
- Animal welfare and rights in Malaysia
