= Peter Jackson (conservationist) =

British tiger conservationist

Peter Jackson (27 January 1926 – 8 December 2016) was a British journalist, photographer and author, who took an interest in the conservation of tigers. In 1983 he became the Chair of the Cat Specialist Group, a position he held for 17 years.

Jackson worked with Reuters and was the chief correspondent for the India bureau from 1954 to 1960 and from 1962 to 1970. His interest in tigers arose during his 18 years in India as a news correspondent, which led to him working with WWF International's Operation Tiger, India's Project Tiger and conservation programs in Nepal, Thailand and Indonesia.

Jackson initially worked independently to promote tiger conservation. He was Chairman of the International Union for Conservation of Nature (IUCN) Cat Specialist Group of the Species Survival Commission (SSC) between 1983 and 2000, and subsequently became chairman emeritus. Jackson was a world-renowned tiger conservationist who was involved in tiger research and conservation efforts from the late 1960s.

In 2005 a newly established subspecies of the tiger, Malayan tiger, was given the name Panthera tigris jacksoni in his honour.

Jackson co-authored and co-edited several publications on big cats and tigers, including Tiger! (Boxtree 1994) with Simon Barnes in association with Tigress Productions and Meridian Broadcasting, Wild Cats: Status Survey and Conservation Action Plan with Kristin Nowell (IUCN 1996) and Riding the Tiger: Tiger Conservation in Human Dominated Landscapes (Cambridge University Press 1999).

Jackson died on 8 December 2016 at the age of 90.
