= Lanchang =

Town in Pahang, Malaysia

- Town

Other transcription(s)
  - Jawi: لنچڠ
  - Chinese: 联增; Liánzēng (Hanyu Pinyin)
  - Tamil: லஞ்சாங் Lañcāṅ (Transliteration)
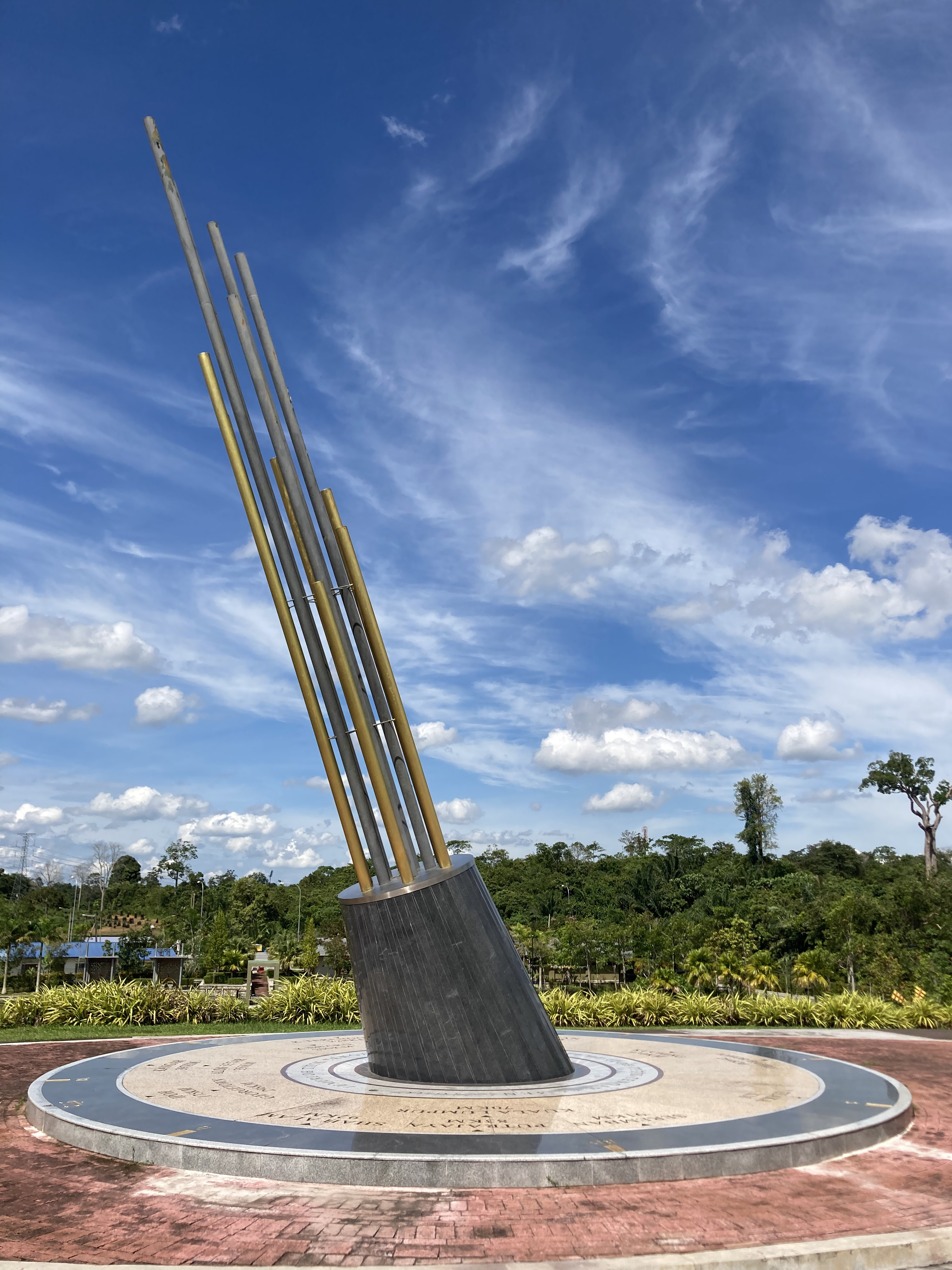
- Geographic centre of Peninsular Malaysia monument.
- Interactive map of Lanchang
- Lanchang in Pahang Lanchang (Malaysia) Lanchang (Southeast Asia)
- Coordinates: 3°29′55.32″N 102°11′23.28″E
- Country: Malaysia
- State: Pahang
- District: Temerloh

Government
  - Type: Municipal council
  - Body: Temerloh Municipal Council

Population (2020 (Note: Population for the state constituency of Lanchang))
  - Total: 38,473
- Time zone: UTC+8 (MST)
- Postal code: 28500
- Area code(s): 09-2xxxxxxx
- Vehicle registration: C

Lanchang is a small town in Temerloh District, Pahang, Malaysia, located 32 km (19.9 mile) from the town of Temerloh and has a total population of 38,473, with a density of 41,000 km^{2}, from the census results of the Malaysian Department of Statistics of Pahang in 2020.

Lanchang has a number of agricultural activities and many Felda projects of both rubber and palm oil plantations. These activities are thriving well today, because it has a low population density, yet still has much land available for agriculture.

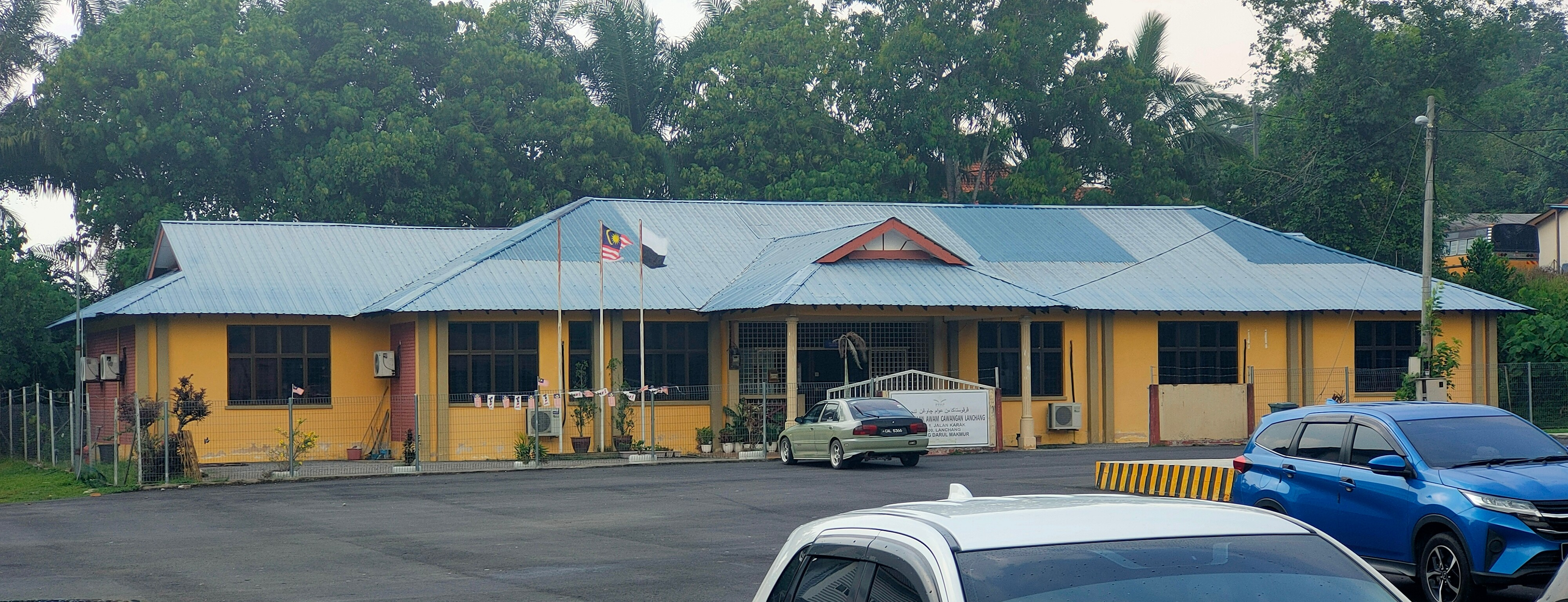
Lanchang library building

== Representative ==
Since the 15th general election in 2022, N31 Lanchang has been represented by Member of the Pahang State Legislative Assembly (MLA), YB Tuan Hassan Omar of (PAS). Before that, Lanchang also known as N27 Lanchang was represented by BN for 8 terms, held successively by V. V. Aboo (MIC) from 1986 to 1990, Bahari Yahaya (UMNO) from 1990 to 1999, and starting the era of Mohd Sharkar Shamsudin (UMNO) from 1999 to 2022 changed to N31 Lanchang.

== List of Villages in Lanchang ==
Traditional Malay Village

1. Kampung Sungai Kepong

2. Kampung Bongsu

3. Kampung Paya Siput

4. Kampung Rantau Panjang

5. Kampung Sementeh

6. Kampung Kenangan

7. Kampung Insaf

8. Kampung Indah

9. Kampung Nasai

10. Kampung Punjung

11. Kampung Dala

12. Kampung Jeragan

13. Kampung Kuala Kaung

14. Kampung Sempadan

15. Kampung Lanar

16. Kampung Mempateh

17. Kampung Tedung

18. Kampung Lubuk Kawah

19. Kampung Paya Laman

20. Kampung Teris

21. Kampung Jergoh

22. Kampung Chempaka

23. Kampung Bolok Hilir

24. Kampung Sokmik

25. Kampung Bolok Hulu

Residential Area

26. Taman Desa Jaya Permai

27. Taman Desa Bongsu

28. Taman Setia

29. Taman Tengku Ampuan Afzan

30. Taman Lanchang Indah

31. Taman Dato Bahaman

32. Taman Lanchang Height

33. Taman Murni

34. Taman RTK Paya Laman

35. Taman Lanchang Permai

Felda Settlement

36. Felda Bukit Damar

37. Felda Lakum

Indigenous Village

38. Kampung Licin

39. Kampung Sungai Leleh

40. Kampung Bukit Ngeri

41. Kampung Bukit Gabang

42. Kampung Selimbar

43. Kampung Beh

44. Kampung Sungai Enggang

Estate Quarters

45. Lanchang Estate

46. Sungai Kawang Estate

Housing Quarters

47. Felcra Paya Laman

48. Perhilitan Bukit Rengit

49. Perhilitan Kuala Gandah

Historical Village Site

50. Kampung Paya Besar (Kampung Sungai Kepong Area)

51. Kampung Wan Peh (Kampung Paya Siput Area)

52. Kampung Rewok (Kampung Paya Siput Area)

53. Kampung Renting (Kampung Rantau Panjang Area)

54. Kampung Seberang Linggam (Kampung Rantau Panjang Area)

55. Kampung Putat Hulu (Kampung Rantau Panjang Area)

56. Kampung Putat Hilir (Kampung Rantau Panjang Area)

57. Kampung Lubuk Langkap (Kampung Rantau Panjang Area)

58. Kampung Wau (Kampung Rantau Panjang Area)

59. Kampung Lancang Kuning (Kampung Orang Asli Licin Area)

60. Kampung Orang Asli Pandau (Kampung Orang Asli Sungai Leleh Area)

61. Kampung Padang Lalang (Kampung Indah Area)

62. Kampung Kuala Senut (Kampung Dala Area)

63. Kampung Danau Perayun (Kampung Dala Area)

64. Kampung Danau Jeragan (Kampung Jeragan Area)

65. Kampung Padang Kambing (Kampung Kuala Kaung Area)

66. Kampung Paluh (Kampung Kuala Kaung Area)

67. Kampung Cukang Paku (Kampung Kuala Kaung Area)

68. Kampung Teluk (Kampung Kuala Kaung Area)

69. Kampung Lubuk Cawan (Kampung Sempadan Area)

70. Kampung Lubuk Petai (Kampung Sempadan Area)

71. Kampung Gong (Kampung Sempadan Area)

72. Kampung Orang Asli Paya Kak (Kampung Sempadan Area)

73. Kampung Pasir Bayam (Kampung Sempadan Area)

74. Kampung Pongsun (Kampung Sempadan Chinese Area)

75. Kampung Baru (Old Name of Kampung Sempadan)

76. Kampung Betong (Kampung Mempateh Area)

77. Kampung Lubuk Terua (Kampung Mempateh Area)

78. Kampung Senggarat (Kampung Mempateh Area)

79. Kampung Padang Perkasa (Kampung Mempateh Area)

80. Kampung Charok Dollah (Kampung Mempateh Area)

81. Kampung Paya Kuala (Kampung Mempateh Area)

82. Kampung Mempateh Tengah (Kampung Mempateh Area)

83. Kampung Luar (Kampung Lubuk Kawah Area)

84. Kampung Kuala Dai (Kampung Lubuk Kawah Area)

85. Kampung Cheriau (Kampung Paya Laman Area)

86. Kampung Tengah (Kampung Teris Area)

87. Kampung Kuala Sokmik (Kampung Teris Area)

88. Kampung Kemuning (Kampung Teris Area)

89. Kampung Batu Tagar (Kampung Chempaka Area)

90. Kampung Sendayan (Kampung Chempaka Area)

91. Kampung Cherok Kelawar (Kampung Chempaka Area)

92. Kampung Sangka Gajah (Kampung Bolok Hilir Area)

93. Kampung Sungai Nangka (Kampung Bolok Hilir Area)

94. Kampung Ulu Irong (Kampung Bolok Hilir Area)

95. Kampung Orang Asli Gahun (Kampung Bolok Hulu Area)

96. Kampung Juru (Kampung Orang Asli Bukit Gabang Area)

97. Kampung Batu Asah (Felda Bukit Damar Area)

98. Kampung Gong (Felda Bukit Damar Area)

99. Kampung Orang Asli Tekal (Lakum Permanent Forest Reserve Area)

== History ==
In Lanchang, there is the oldest village that can be traced, called Kampung Kemuning, dating back to around 1630, 119 years after the Portuguese colonial conquest of Malacca City in 1511. The villages in Lanchang that exist today almost all come from Kampung Kemuning, which has a family descended from Tun Teh.

The history of another name for Lanchang is Semantan, which is believed to come from the word Seman Tahan which is a Brunei citizen who lived in one of the tributaries of Sungai Pahang which is now known as Sungai Semantan. His name is Osman, and he has knowledge of defense and is good at martial arts. Because of that, he was known as Seman Tahan, because of his endurance when fighting, and he was very famous among the people around the river who later referred to him simply and became known as Semantan.

The arrival of many residents to the Semantan area has made the settlement area expand beyond the Kuala Semantan area, or as it is now known as Temerloh, which only includes the mouth of the river, which is the area around the confluence of the Semantan River and the Pahang River. Therefore, this settlement has grown rapidly into a small town and was given a new name, Lanchang. Lanchang is now one of the mukims or zones whose economy has grown since the introduction of rubber cultivation, it has become the main crop along with rice by 1909.

Lanchang is very famous all over the world because it is one of the birthplaces of freedom fighters who fought against foreign colonization led by Dato' Bahaman, or better known as the Orang Kaya Semantan, who fought in the past to drive out the British Resident who had established himself and wanted to interfere in the administration of the rulers and affairs in the state of Pahang on the basis of widespread colonization and imperialism in the 19th century, during that era the British colonialists also built an observation post in the Kampung Batu Tagar area and a police station in the Kampung Mempateh Tengah area on the banks of the semantan river which was eventually attacked and burned by Mat Kilau and his lieutenants. In the 20th century, there was also another person who was considered a nationalist revolutionary fighter by the community in Mukim Semantan or Lanchang Zone in the early 20th century, namely Abu Samah Mohd Kassim who was also a great figure who was the grandson of Dato' Bahaman who also followed in the footsteps of his ancestors to achieve independence to drive out colonization from this beloved homeland. According to oral sources from local residents, which were also said to be during the height of the communist era, the second police station that was built after the first police station was burned by Mat Kilau and his cronies was rebuilt and located in the Kampung Mempateh area as well, but in a different location, precisely at an old chinese well (also known as a British well) that was also burned by a group of communists, and finally the third police station was built in the Kampung Insaf area near Lanchang Town.

== Transportation Road ==
Traditional Route

In the pre-independence era, the people in Lanchang often used the river route as the main road, with the Semantan River upstream connecting to the Bentong area, while the Semantan River could also flow downstream to the Kuala Semantan (Temerloh) area, where Kuala Semantan connected the Hulu Pahang and Hilir Pahang areas.

Modern Route

Lanchang is served by the East Coast Expressway and the older Malaysia Federal Route 2, both of which connect the town with Kuala Lumpur as well as the state capital city of Kuantan. Lanchang also has alternative roads to several districts such as routes to the districts of Bentong, Raub, Maran, Bera and Jerantut.

== Economy ==
Traditional Economy

Lanchang has long been an area famous for its rice cultivation as well as cash crop cultivation.

Modern Economy

Lanchang today has changed economically, where rice farming has been replaced by oil palm and rubber plantations.

== Education ==
Primary School

(National School)

1. Sekolah Kebangsaan Rantau Panjang

2. Sekolah Kebangsaan Lanchang

3. Sekolah Kebangsaan Kuala Kaung

4. Sekolah Kebangsaan Lubuk Terua

5. Sekolah Kebangsaan Bolok

6. Sekolah Kebangsaan Bukit Damar

7. Sekolah Kebangsaan Lakum

(Vernacular School)

8. Sekolah Jenis Kebangsaan Cina Lanchang

9. Sekolah Jenis Kebangsaan Tamil Ladang Sungai Kawang

10. Sekolah Jenis Kebangsaan Tamil Ladang Lanchang

High school

(National School)

11. Sekolah Menengah Kebangsaan Datuk Bahaman

12. Sekolah Menengah Kebangsaan Lanchang

13. Sekolah Menengah Kebangsaan Bukit Damar

== Hills, Cascades, Lakes and Caves ==
1. Bukit Woh (Kampung Paya Siput Area)

2. Lata Woh (Kampung Paya Siput Area)

3. Bukit Klompang (Kampung Rantau Panjang Area)

4. Danau Licin (Kampung Orang Asli Licin Area)

5. Danau Chermang (Kampung Sementeh Area)

6. Danau Putus Nasai (Kampung Insaf Area)

7. Bukit Punjung (Kampung Punjung Area)

8. Bukit Che Timah (Kampung Mempateh Area)

9. Bukit Bujei (Kampung Lubuk Kawah Area)

10. Bukit Pulai (Kampung Paya Laman Area)

11. Bukit Penangkap (Kampung Teris Area)

12. Lata Nering (Kampung Jergoh Area)

13. Gua Lalat (Kampung Bolok Hilir Area)

14. Bukit Kalung Gantai (Kampung Bolok Hilir Area)

15. Bukit Rengit (Kampung Bolok Hulu Area)

16. Lata Tujuh (Tengku Hassanal Wildlife Reserve Area)

17. Bukit Selimbar (Felda Bukit Damar Area)

18. Gua Tapah (Krau Permanent Forest Reserve Area)

19. Gunung Tapah (Krau Permanent Forest Reserve Area)

20. Bukit Jekas (Krau Permanent Forest Reserve Area)

21. Bukit Pot (Krau Permanent Forest Reserve Area)

== Attractions ==
Kuala Gandah Elephant Conservation Centre

The Kuala Gandah Elephant Conservation Centre is situated in Kampung Orang Asli Sungai Enggang, in Kampung Bolok Hulu. This is considered the main attraction of this town.

As the name suggests, it is an Asian elephant (Elephas maximus) sanctuary, which is listed as endangered, as according to the UNEP there are only about 1,000 wild Asian elephants left on the Malay peninsula. The rapid development phase in Malaysia has effects on the elephants. Unused land and forest became a much sought after commodity. As agricultural development rapidly encroached into these areas, the elephants' natural and ancestral foraging ground shrunk smaller and smaller. Consequently, some of these elephants began to forage in new farm areas and plantations.

An effort by the Department of Wildlife and National Parks was the setting up of an elephant translocation unit in 1974 to track down, capture and then release these elephants into larger and safer forest reserves throughout the Peninsula.

Deerland Park

This park is an animal sanctuary that has areas dedicated to different types of deer species and other animals. There is also a section dedicated to herbs.

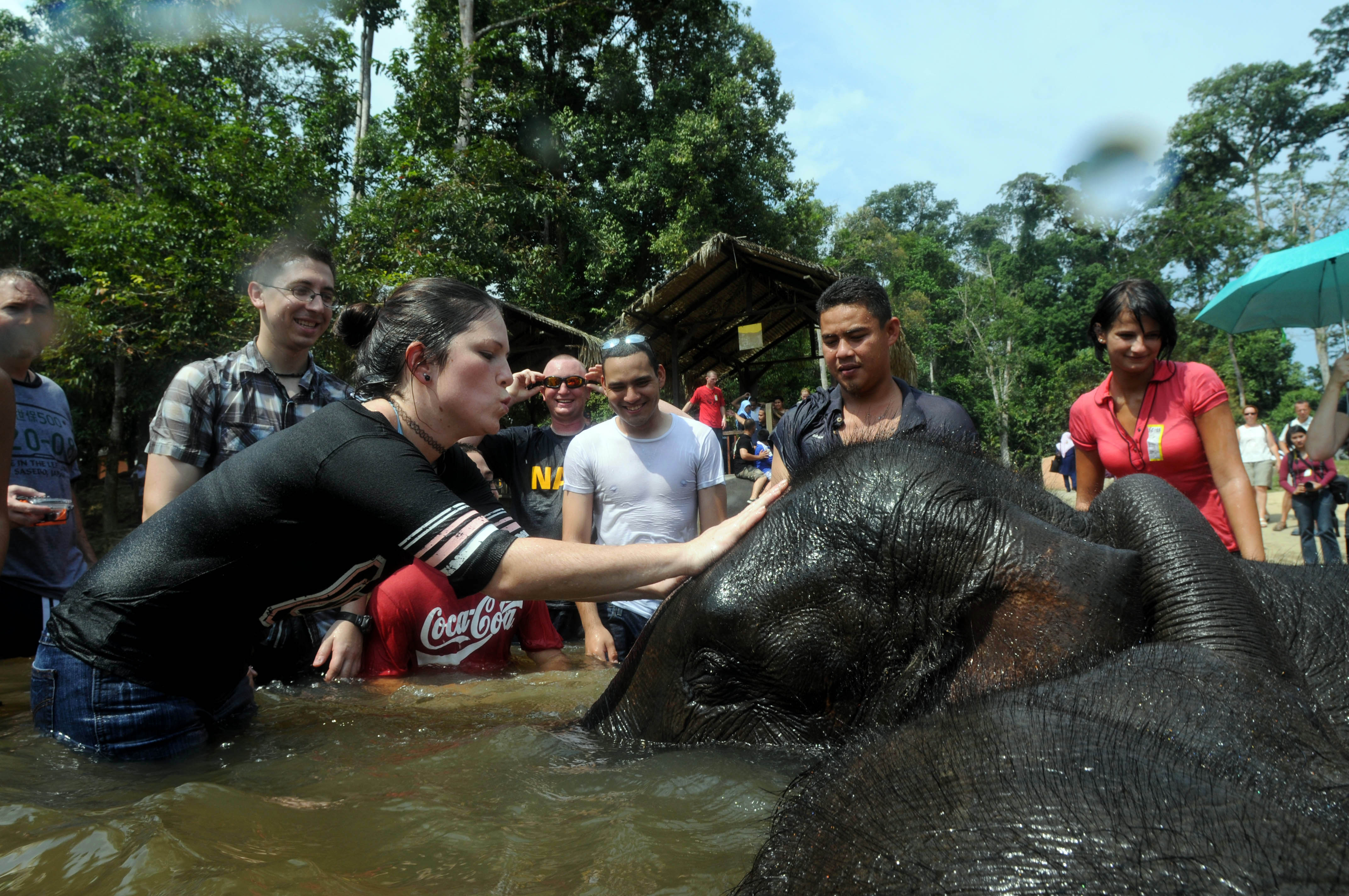
Visitors help to wash a young elephant at Kuala Gandah Elephant Conservation Centre.

Malayan Tiger Conservation Center

The Malayan Tiger Conservation Center (MTCC), built on 80 hectares of land in Lanchang, is the only Malayan tiger conservation center in the country.

MTCC started operating on February 1, 2022, which aims to increase the breeding of tigers and release the animals before they are released into their natural habitat.

The existence of the Malayan Tiger Conservation Center which cost RM42.25 million is aimed to overcome the problem of the extinction of the animal species which is becoming critical.

Geographic Centre of Peninsular Malaysia Monument

Lanchang is also home to the geographic centre of Peninsular Malaysia (3°29′33″N 102°13′10″E), situated in Kampung Paya Siput (Batu 11). The monument was built near a monument built by the Department of Survey and Mapping Malaysia to mark zero degrees or in other words, the Central Point of Peninsular Malaysia.

Other attractions

Other places of interest around Lanchang include Bukit Rengit, Lata Woh, Bukit Woh, and Bukit Gahun.

== Public Facilities ==
1. Mosque

2. Clinic

3. Police Station

4. AGROBank

5. ATM Machine in BHPetrol

6. BHPetrol Gas Station

7. Supermarket Mempaga Segar Lanchang

8. 99 Speedmart Lanchang

9. 118 Freshmart Lanchang

10. Bus Stop

11. Multipurpose Hall

12. Community Centre

13. Datuk Bahaman Square

14. Dala Suspension Bridge

15. Mempateh Bridge

16. Lanar Water Treatment Plant
