= Malaysian Wildlife Law =

Malaysian Wildlife Law (Malay: Undang-Undang Hidupan Liar Malaysia) consists of the regulation, protection, conservation and management of wildlife in Malaysia. The Constitution of Malaysia empowers those at the federal and the states level to make laws regarding wildlife resources. As such, eleven states in peninsular are managed under an act while Sabah enacted an enactment and Sarawak an ordinance.

== Precursor to the Federal Wildlife Act ==
A Wildlife Commission of Malaya was established by the British colonists in 1932 to make full inquiry into existing regulations for protection of wildlife; ways to deal with wildlife damage to agriculture; and the organisation needed to administer the preservation of wildlife. Some of the major recommendations of the report were:

- Appointment of Commissioner for Wildlife and another for National Parks
- Establishment of Taman Negara and Krau Game Reserve
- Open and close hunting seasons
- Total ban on wildlife commercialisation
- Appointment of honorary Deputy Wildlife Officers, wildlife rangers as guardian of forest and wildlife
- Conservation and management of riverine fish
- Establishment of Wildlife Fund.

The report provided the framework for the consolidation of the state game offices and establishment of the Wildlife Ordinance 1955 in Malayan States. Later, the 1955 Ordinance was repealed with the enactment of the Wildlife Protection Act 1972 by the Malaysia Parliament. The 1972 Act enable for the federalisation of all state wildlife departments and appointment of the Director-General of Department of Wildlife and National Parks (DWNP).

=== List of DWNP Directors-General ===
- Mr Bernard Thong
- Mr Mohd Khan Bin Momin Khan
- Dato' Musa Nordin
- Dato' Abd Rashid Samsuddin
- Dato’ Abdul Kadir bin Abu Hashim

== Federal laws and policies ==
There are various other laws that mentioned on the wildlife or habitat conservation issues in Malaysia.

| Law | Details |
|---|---|
| Aboriginal Peoples Act 1954 | • Provides for the protection, well-being and advancement of aboriginal people. • No land within an aboriginal area can be designated as wildlife reserve. |
| Land Conservation Act 1960 | • Specifically to conserve hill lands, to prevent soil erosion, and control salutation. |
| Land Capability Classification 1963 | • Land use planning in PM has been partly based on LCC. • Mining and agriculture have higher priority; then only forestry and other uses. • Wildlife reserves and protected forest reserves are included in the category for land possessing little or no mineral, agricultural or productive forest development potential in Class V. |
| National Land Code 1965 | • Makes provisions to set aside potential protected areas as wildlife reserve or national park. |
| Customs Act 1967 (amended in 1988) | • Identifies that the DWNP as the reference agency for import and export of any wild bird and animal, alive or dead; DWNP licence; CITES permit |
| Environmental Quality Act 1974 (amended 1985) | • DOE monitors 20 specific activities and parameters related to pollution and environmental standards. • Prescribed activities that affect forest e.g. logging >5 km² • EIA guidelines for forestry |
| Local Government Act No. 171 of 1976 | • Empowers the state government to create local authorities, who then may establish and manage public places, including parks and provide for the creation of small protected areas of natural habitat and intensively managed parks. |
| Town and Country Planning Act No. 172 of 1976 | • Empowers the state to have their own T&CPD. • Ensures conservation is an essential component of land use planning and authorises the state to set aside specific areas as conservation zones. |
| Third Malaysia Plan 1976–1980 | • The first time mentioned on the proposed additional 15 conservation areas totalling 5,663.30 km². |
| The National Forest Policy 1978 revised in 1992 | • Applicable to Peninsular Malaysia. • Provides the classification of forests as protective, productive and amenity forests. • Provides guidelines for the management of remaining forest resources. • Forest harvesting is carried out in the production forest and state land forest. |
| National Parks Act 1980 | • Provides for the states to establish national parks to be administered by DWNP under the federal government. |
| National Forest Act 1984 (Act 313) | • Act to provide for the administration, management and conservation of forests and forestry development within the States of Malaysia. |
| Fisheries Act 1985 (Act 317) | • Act relating to fisheries, including the conservation, management and development of maritime and estuarine fishing and fisheries, in Malaysia waters, to turtles and riverine fishing in Malaysia and to matters connected therewith or incidental thereto. • Establishment of marine park and marine reserve. • Protection of aquatic mammals and turtles. |
| National Conservation Strategy 1993 | • Emphasis on the conservation of natural resources, develop sustainable and improve efficiency in resource use and management. |
| National Environment Policy | • Aim at achieving development taking account the environmental carrying capacity and conserving the country's cultural and natural heritage, all within the concept of sustainable development. |
| National Policy on Biodiversity 1994 | • Sets out a policy, strategy and action plan of programmes for effective conservation and management of biological diversity. • Enhance sustainable utilization of biodiversity. • Strengthen biodiversity management. |
| Marine Park Island Management Conceptual Plan 1994 | • Identifies important marine resources and habitats within protected waters. • Protection of specific land areas on these islands |
| National Ecotourism Plan 1995 | • Use ecotourism as a way to promote conservation and sustainable development. |
| Wildlife Conservation Act 2010 | Regulate, protect, conserve and manage wildlife. |
| Wildlife Conservation Act 2020 (Act 716) | Amended 2021 and 2022 |

== State government policy and legislature ==
- Taman Negara Enactments of 1938 and 1939 in Kelantan, Terengganu and Pahang – Empowers the DWNP to manage Taman Negara with a total area of 4,324.53 km².
- River Terrapin Enactment (Kedah) of 1972 – Protection and management of turtles, tortoises and terrapins by DWNP
- National Park of Johore Enactment 1989 – Provides for the creation of parks in Johor
- State Parks Enactment (Trengganu) of 1987 – Similar to the National Park Act of 1980; but none have been designated yet.

== Legislations applicable to Sarawak ==
- Forest Ordinance 1954 – An Ordinance to provide for the regulation of taking forest produces; protection and management of the forest of Sarawak.
- Natural Resources and Environmental Ordinance 1994
- National Parks and Nature Reserve Ordinance 1998 (Chapter 27) – An Ordinance for the constitution and management of National Parks and Nature Reserves and all matters incidental thereto.
- Wildlife Protection Ordinance 1998 – An Ordinance to provide better provisions for the protection of wild life, the establishment and management of Wild Life Sanctuaries and all matters ancillary thereto.
- Sarawak Biodiversity Ordinance 1998

== Legislation applicable to Sabah ==
- Kinabalu Park Ordinance 1962 Sabah Parks – A law for the constitution of the Kinabalu Park
- Wildlife Conservation Enactment 1997 – A law for the regulation, protection, conservation and management of wildlife, caves and wildlife areas.
- Sabah Biodiversity Enactment 2001 – A law for the regulation of biological research on the natural resources

== See also ==
- Fisheries Act 1985
- List of national parks in Malaysia
- Sabah Wildlife Department
- Wildlife Conservation Enactment
