= Syed Hamid Syed Mohamed =

Malaysian politician

Yang Berbahagia Dato' Syed Hamid Syed Mohamed DSAP
- سيد حميد سيد محمد

Member of the Pahang State Legislative Assembly for Kuala Semantan
- In office 8 March 2008 – 9 May 2018
- Preceded by: Md Hamdan Sudin (BN–UMNO)
- Succeeded by: Nor Azmi Mat Ludin (BN–UMNO)
- Majority: 932 (2008); 2,685 (2013)

Personal details
- Party: Malaysian Islamic Party (PAS) (–2015); National Trust Party (AMANAH) (2015–present)
- Other political affiliations: Pakatan Rakyat (PR) (2008–2015); Pakatan Harapan (PH) (2015–present)
- Occupation: Politician

Syed Hamid bin Syed Mohamed is a Malaysian politician who had served as Member of the Pahang State Legislative Assembly (MLA) for Kuala Semantan from March 2008 to May 2018. Syed Hamid initially won the constituency as a PAS member but later exited and joined AMANAH in 2015.

== Election results ==
Pahang State Legislative Assembly
Year	Constituency	Candidate	Votes	Pct	Opponent(s)	Votes	Pct	Ballots cast	Majority	Turnout
2008	N32 Kuala Semantan	Syed Hamid Syed Mohamed (PAS)	8,136	53.04%	Khairuddin Abdul Manan (UMNO)	7,204	46.96%	15,715	932	77.40%
2013	N32 Kuala Semantan	Syed Hamid Syed Mohamed (PAS)	12,101	56.24%	Mohammad Anuar Mohd Yunus (UMNO)	9,416	43.76%	21,802	2,685	85.53%
2018	N32 Kuala Semantan	Syed Hamid Syed Mohamed (AMANAH)	6,095	28.51%	Nor Azmi Mat Ludin (UMNO)	7,880	36.86%	21,742	474	83.80%
2018	N32 Kuala Semantan	Syed Hamid Syed Mohamed (AMANAH)	6,095	28.51%	Hassanuddin Salim (PAS)	7,406	34.64%	21,742	474	83.80%

== Honours ==
- Pahang :
  - Knight Companion of the Order of Sultan Ahmad Shah of Pahang (DSAP) – Dato' (2021)
