= Simon Barnes =

British journalist

- Occupation: Journalist
- Known for: Chief Sports Writer of The Times until 2014
- Notable work: Birdwatching With your Eyes Closed: An Introduction to Birdsong

Simon Barnes is a British journalist. He was chief sports writer of The Times until 2014, and wrote a wildlife opinion column in the Saturday edition of the same newspaper. He has written three novels.

The son of Edward Barnes, a co-creator of the BBC children's TV programme Blue Peter, Barnes was educated at Emanuel School, and studied English literature at the University of Bristol, which awarded him an honorary doctorate in 2007.

After beginning his journalism career on local newspapers in Britain, he travelled to Hong Kong, where he wrote for travel magazines and, briefly, the South China Morning Post. After his return to Britain, he became a sports writer for The Times, being promoted in time to the position of Chief Sports Writer. He is the author of 16 books, including three novels. His latest book, Birdwatching With your Eyes Closed: An Introduction to Birdsong, was published in 2011. Barnes has appeared in a number of programmes on BBC Radio 2, including a reading of his book How to Be a Bad Birdwatcher.

Barnes lives in Norfolk. He was on The Times team at the 2012 London Olympics, the seventh summer Games that he has covered for the newspaper. In March 2009 he was runner-up in the Sports Journalists' Association's 'Sports Columnist of the Year' award, an award he won in 2008.

In June 2014 Barnes was sacked by The Times after 32 years' employment, the newspaper having informed him it could no longer afford to pay his salary. Speculation in some sections of the UK media was that the real reason may have been Barnes's outspoken views expressed in his wildlife opinion column. The column blamed illegal activity by red grouse shooting interests for the continued persecution and near extinction of the hen harrier in England. Writing on his blog, which he began after leaving The Times in 2014, Barnes wrote: "Certainly I have annoyed some powerful people."

== Bibliography ==
- with Nik Wheeler (1981). China in focus. Hong Kong: CFW Guidebooks. pp. 63p. : chiefly col ill. ISBN 962-7031-12-7.
- Phil Edmonds: a singular man. London: Kingswood. 1986. pp. xi, 179p, [8]p of plates : ill., ports., 24cm. ISBN 0-434-98092-7.
- Eamonn McCabe, photographer. London: Kingswood. 1988. pp. xxii, 88 p. : ill., ports., 29 cm. ISBN 0-434-98147-8.
- Horsesweat and tears a year in John Dunlop's racing stable. London: Heinemann Kingswood. 1988. pp. xii, 228p, 8p. of plates, 24cm. ISBN 0-434-98152-4.
- A la recherche du cricket perdu. London: Macmillan London. 1989. pp. v, 137p : ill, 21cm. ISBN 0-333-48722-2., winner of The Cricket Society/MCC Book of the Year
- A Sportswriter's Year. London: Heinemann London. 1989. pp. v, 224p : ill, 25cm. ISBN 0-434-98180-X.
- Flying in the face of nature a year in Minsmere Bird Reserve. London: Pelham. 1992. pp. xi, 227p, 25cm. ISBN 0-7207-2005-2.
- with Peter Jackson (1994). Tiger!. London: Boxtree in association with Tigress Productions and Meridian Broadcasting. pp. 160p, 29cm. ISBN 1-85283-931-7.
- Rogue Lion Safaris. London: HarperCollins, London. 1997. pp. 320 p. : col. ill.., 33cm. ISBN 0-00-649849-3.
- Hong Kong Belongers. London: HarperCollins, London. 1999. pp. 320 p., 33cm. ISBN 0-00-651195-3.
- with Alan Marks (2000). Planet Zoo: One Hundred Animals We Can't Afford to Lose. London: Orion Children's. pp. 264 p. : col. ill.., 28 cm. ISBN 1-85881-488-X.
- Miss Chance. London: HarperCollins, London. 2000. pp. 288 p., 27 cm. ISBN 0-00-651196-1.
- How to be a bad birdwatcher: To the greater glory of life. London: Short. 2004. pp. 198 p. : ill., 21 cm. ISBN 1-904095-95-X.
- A bad birdwatcher's companion --or a personal introduction to Britain's 50 most obvious birds. London: Short. 2005. pp. 281 p. : ill., 21 cm. ISBN 1-904977-37-5.
- The meaning of sport. London: Short. 2007. pp. 365 p., 20 cm. ISBN 978-1-904977-85-8.
- with Joseph Barnes (2008). How to be wild. London: Short. pp. 1 v. : ill., 20 cm. ISBN 978-1-906021-48-1.
- The Horsey Life. London: Short. 2008. pp. 288 : ill., 25 cm. ISBN 978-1-906021-42-9.
- Birdwatching With your Eyes Closed: An Introduction to Birdsong. London: Short. 2011. p. 288. ISBN 978-1-907595-47-9.
- Ten Million Aliens. London: Short. 2014. pp. 480 p. ISBN 978-1780721422.
- Rewild Yourself: 23 Spellbinding Ways to Make Nature More Visible. London: Simon and Schuster UK. 2018. p. 208. ISBN 978-1471175404.
- On the Marsh: A Year Surrounded by Wildness and Wet. Simon & Schuster UK. 2019. ISBN 978-1-4711-6849-9.
- The Year of Sitting Dangerously: My Garden Safari. London: Simon and Schuster UK. 2023. p. 336. ISBN 978-1398518902.
- Barnes, Simon (2025). Twelve Books to Furnish a Room. London: Anthony Powell Society. ISBN 978-0-9956267-9-9.
