= Kuala Gandah Elephant Conservation Centre =

Coordinates: 3.5923°N 102.1428177°E

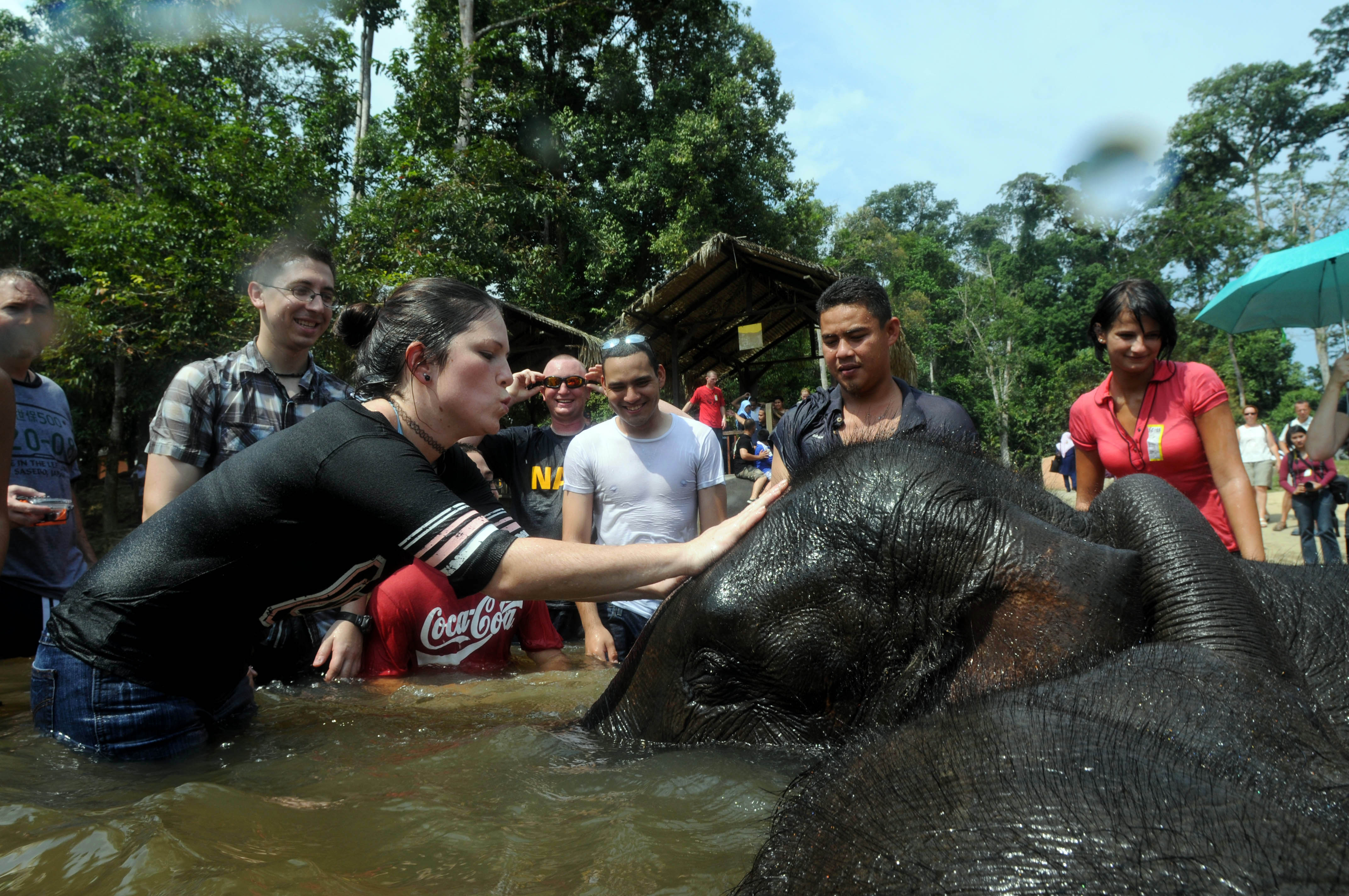
Visitors help to wash a young elephant at Kuala Gandah Elephant Conservation Centre.

The Kuala Gandah Elephant Conservation Centre is an elephant sanctuary located in Temerloh in the state of Pahang, Malaysia. within the Krau Wildlife Reserve.

The Centre was established in 1989 by the Malaysian Department of Wildlife and National Parks, and forms a base for the Elephant Relocation Team, which since 1974 has been rescuing problem Asian elephants whose habitats are being lost to cultivation or development. and relocating them to suitable habitats such as Taman Negara. The Centre also aims to raise public awareness and support research, and has increasingly become a popular tourist attraction since its existence began to be publicised in 1997.

Visitors to the Centre can enter for free but can give a donation which helps towards the food costs, medical expenses as well as future elephant rescues. The centre offers to go into the river with two younger elephants. You can buy sugar cane for a small fee to feed the elephants. Elephant shows are performed daily in the afternoon to give education on the elephants. Daily visitor admissions are subject to strict quotas and advance booking is strongly recommended. Since limited budget together with congestion is a growing concern in Elephant centre's management, generating more sustainable source of income has to be considered (e.g. entry fee).

== Gallery ==
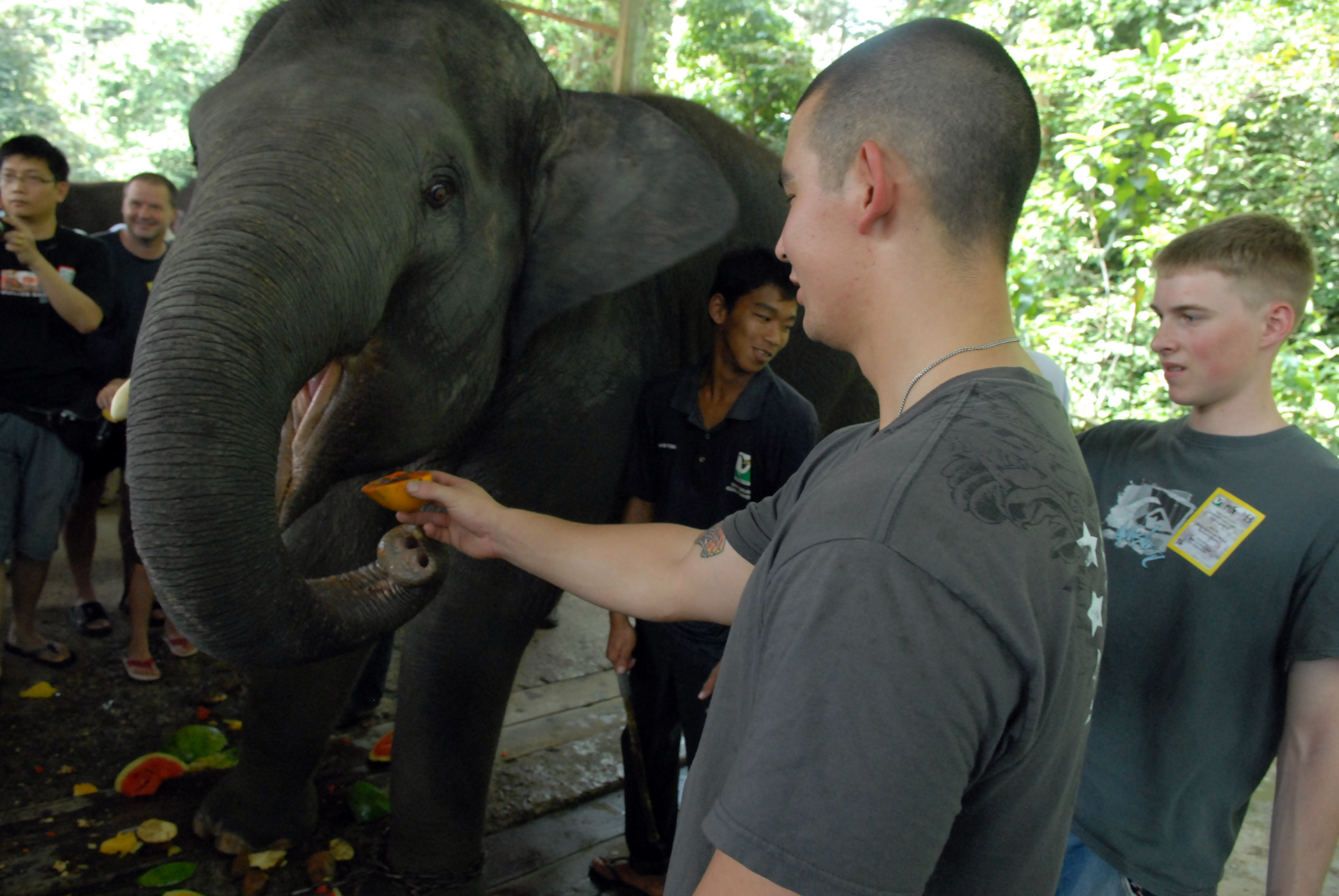
Visitors feeding an elephant.

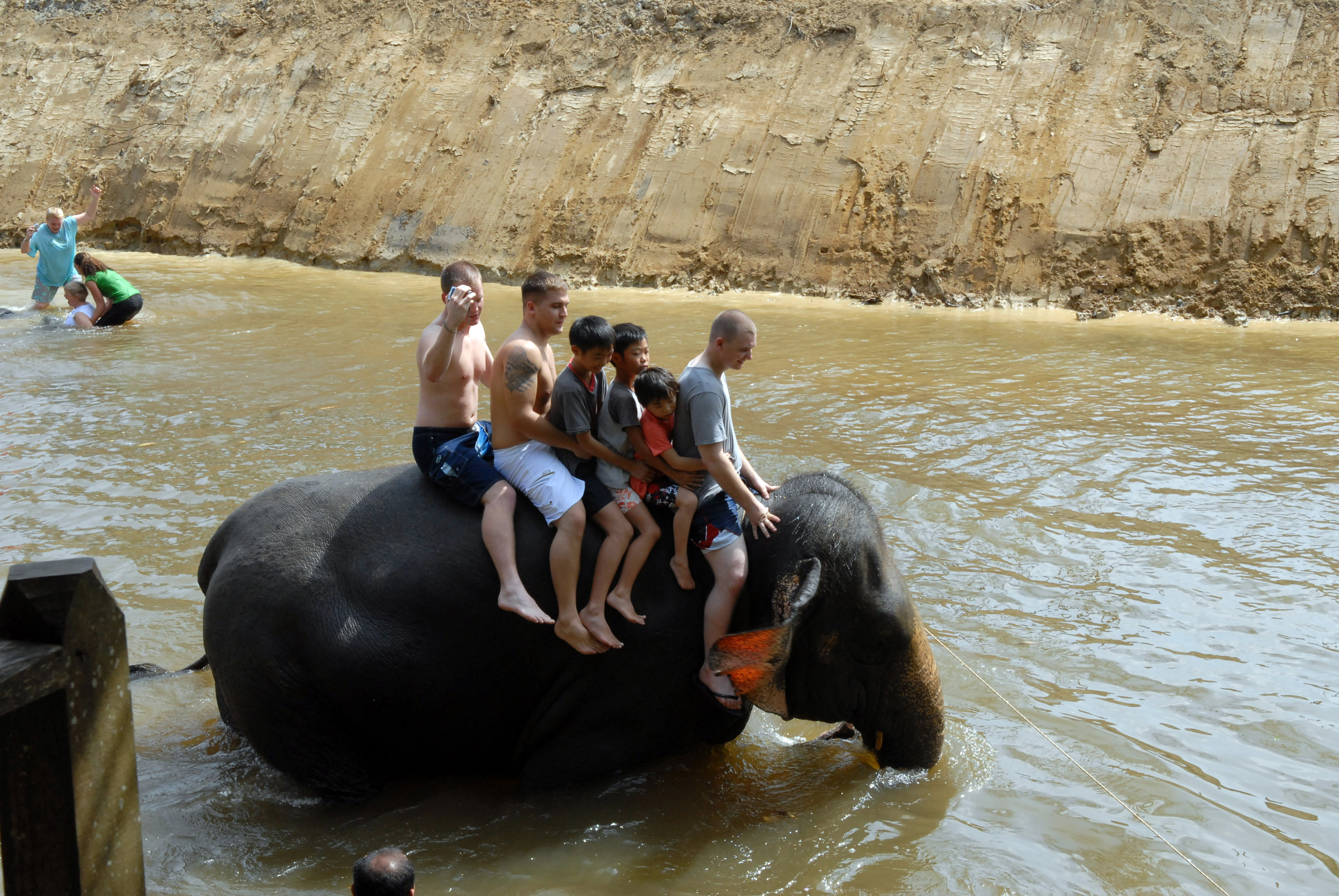
Elephant rides.

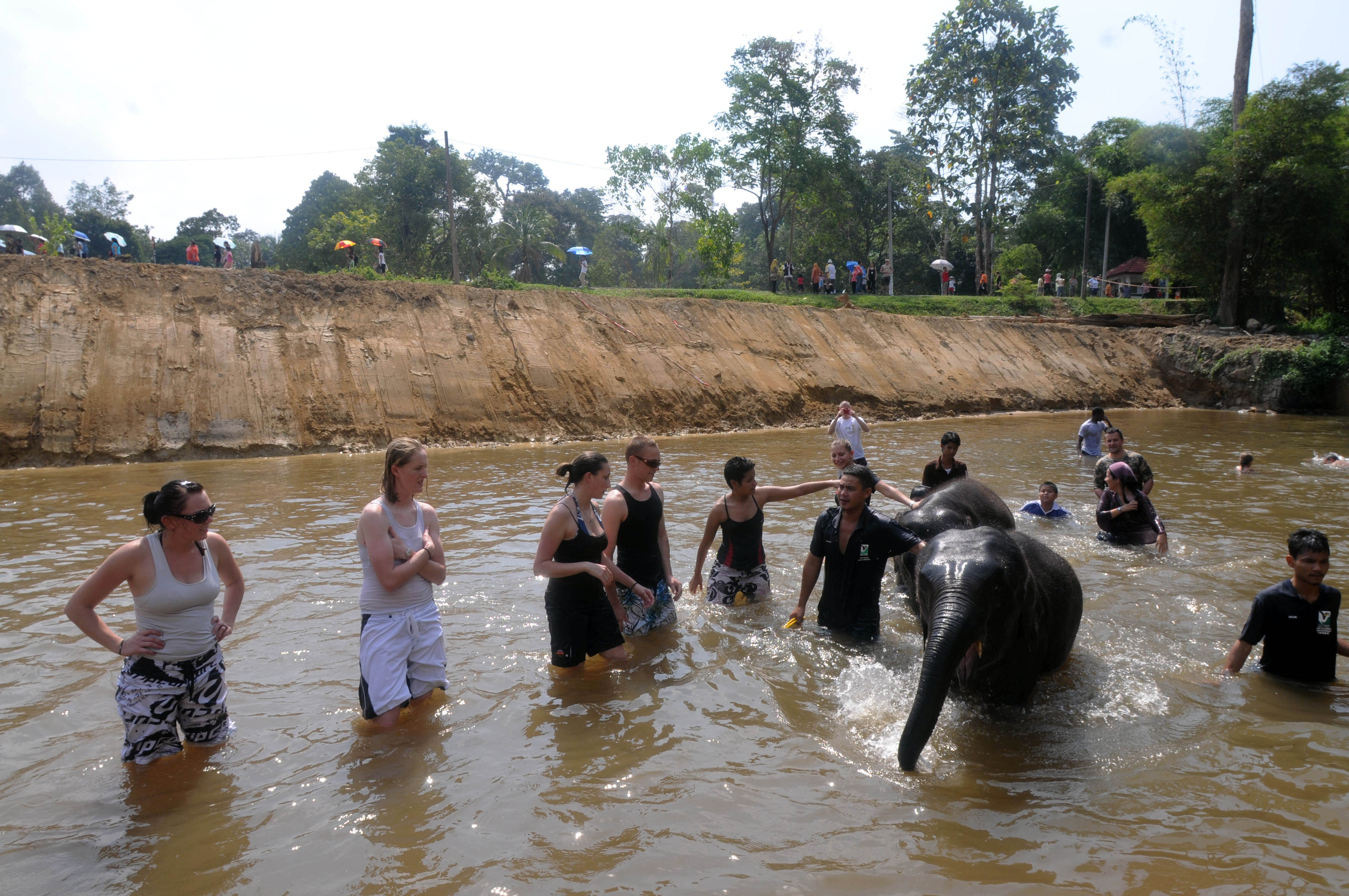
Helping to bath the elephants.

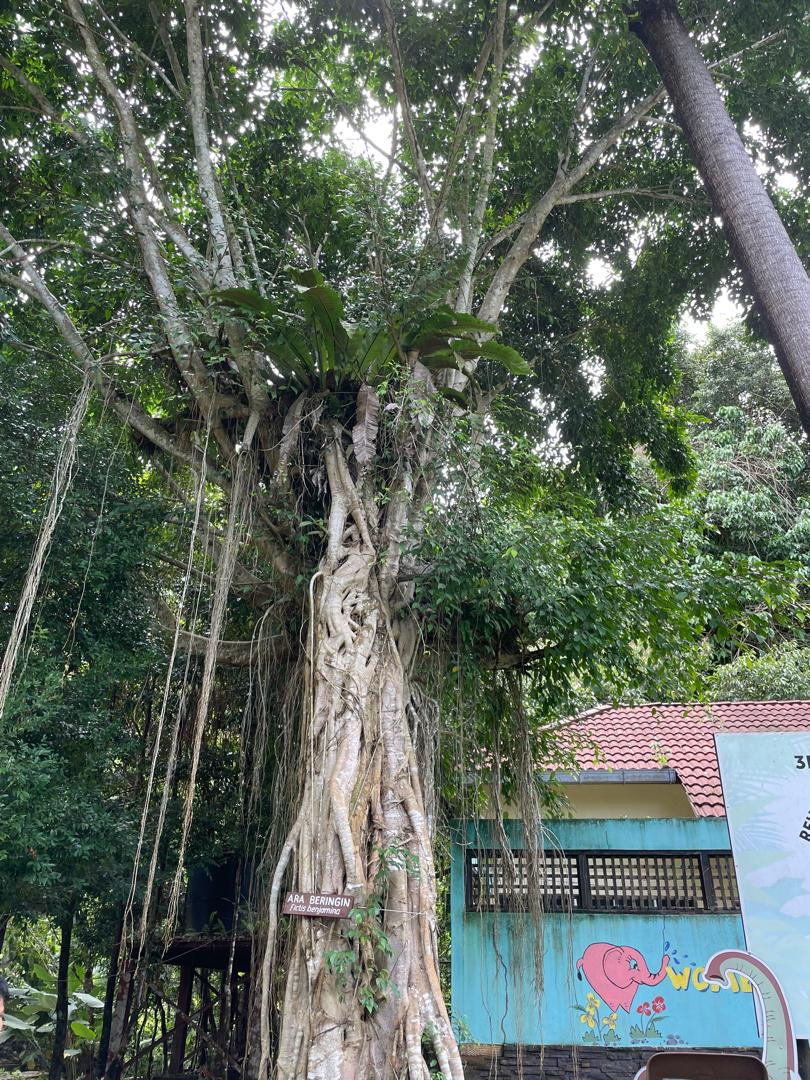
A tree of Ficus benjamina at the centre.
