= Wildlife Conservation Enactment 1997 =

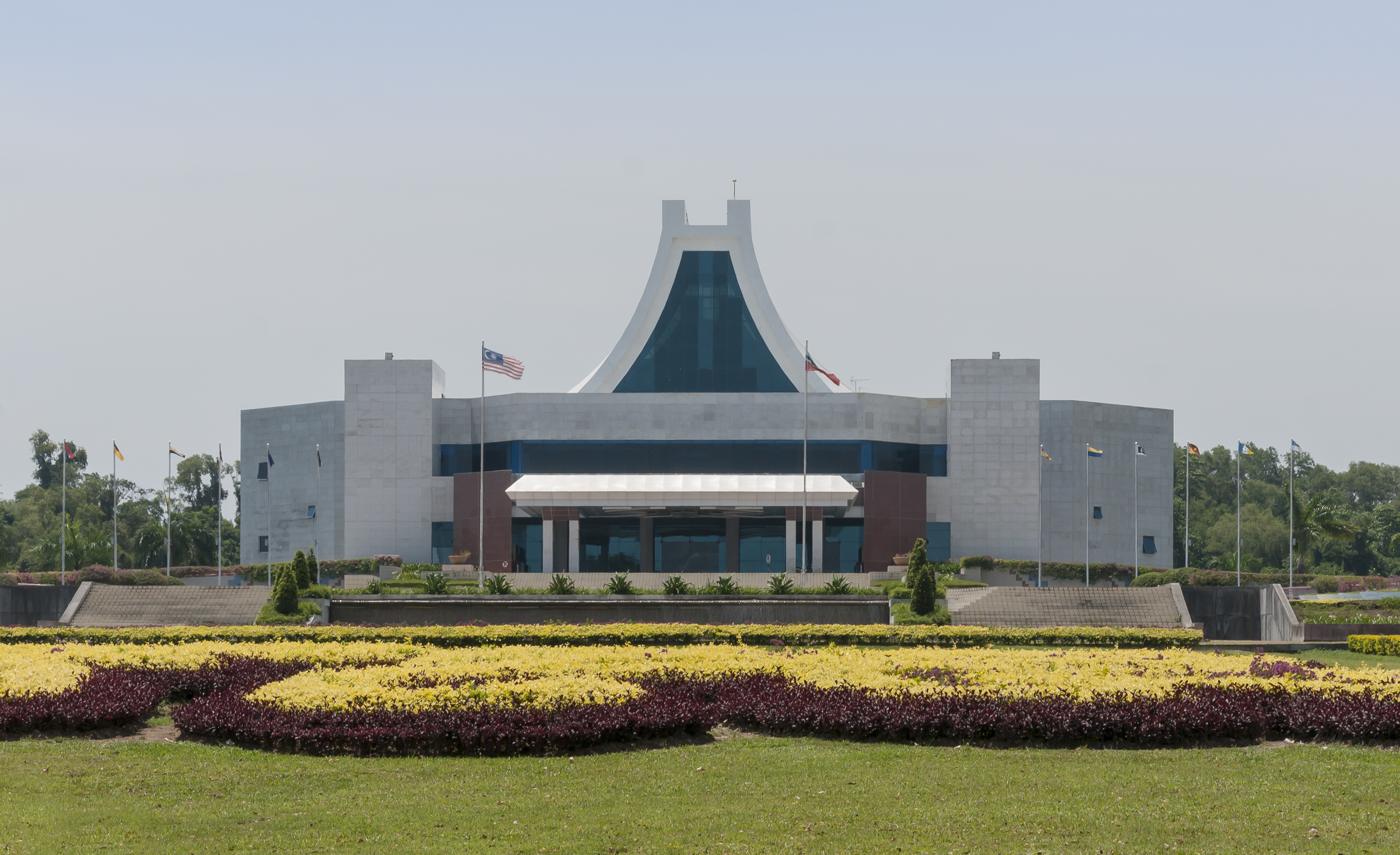

Sabah State Legislative Assembly
- Long title: An Enactment to make provisions for the conservation and management of wildlife and its habitats in the State of Sabah for the benefit and enjoyment of the present and future generations of the people of the State of Sabah.
- Citation: Sabah No. 6 of 1997
- Territorial extent: Sabah
- Passed: 18 November 1997
- Assented to by: Sakaran Dandai, Yang di-Pertua Negeri of Sabah
- Assented to: 24 December 1997
- Effective: 31 July 1998
- Administered by: Sabah Wildlife Department

Amends
- The Forest Enactment 1968 [En. No. 2 of 1968]

Repeals
- Birds' Nests Ordinance [Cap. 15] Section 25 of The Land Ordinance [Cap.68.] The Fauna Conservation Ordinance 1963 [Ord. No. 11 of 1963.]

Amended by
- [Enactment No. 8 of 2002] [G.N.S. 30/2013] [Enactment No. 9 of 2016] [G.N.S. 10/2017]

Keywords
- Habitat conservation, habitat management, wildlife conservation, wildlife management
- Status: In force

The Wildlife Conservation Enactment 1997 (Malay: Enakmen Pemeliharaan Hidupan Liar 1997) is a regional piece of legislation enforced only in the state of Sabah in Malaysian Borneo. Its aim is to protect the endangered species of fauna and flora in the region as well as control international trade of these species. It also details specific punishments for those that break the rules and regulations put forth in the enactment.

== Structure ==
The Wildlife Conservation Enactment 1997, in its current form (27 April 2016), consists of 12 Parts containing 119 sections and 5 schedules.

- Part I: Preliminary
- Part II: Administration
- Part III: Protected Areas
- Part IV: Protection of Animals and Hunting
- Part V: Possession of and Trade in Animals
- Part VI: Protection of Plants
- Part VII: Utilisation of Wildlife
- Part VIII: Enforcement
- Part IX: Offences
- Part X: Liability of Company Members, Administrative Penalties and Other Penalties
- Part XI: Powers of the Minister
- Part XII: Miscellaneous
- Schedules
