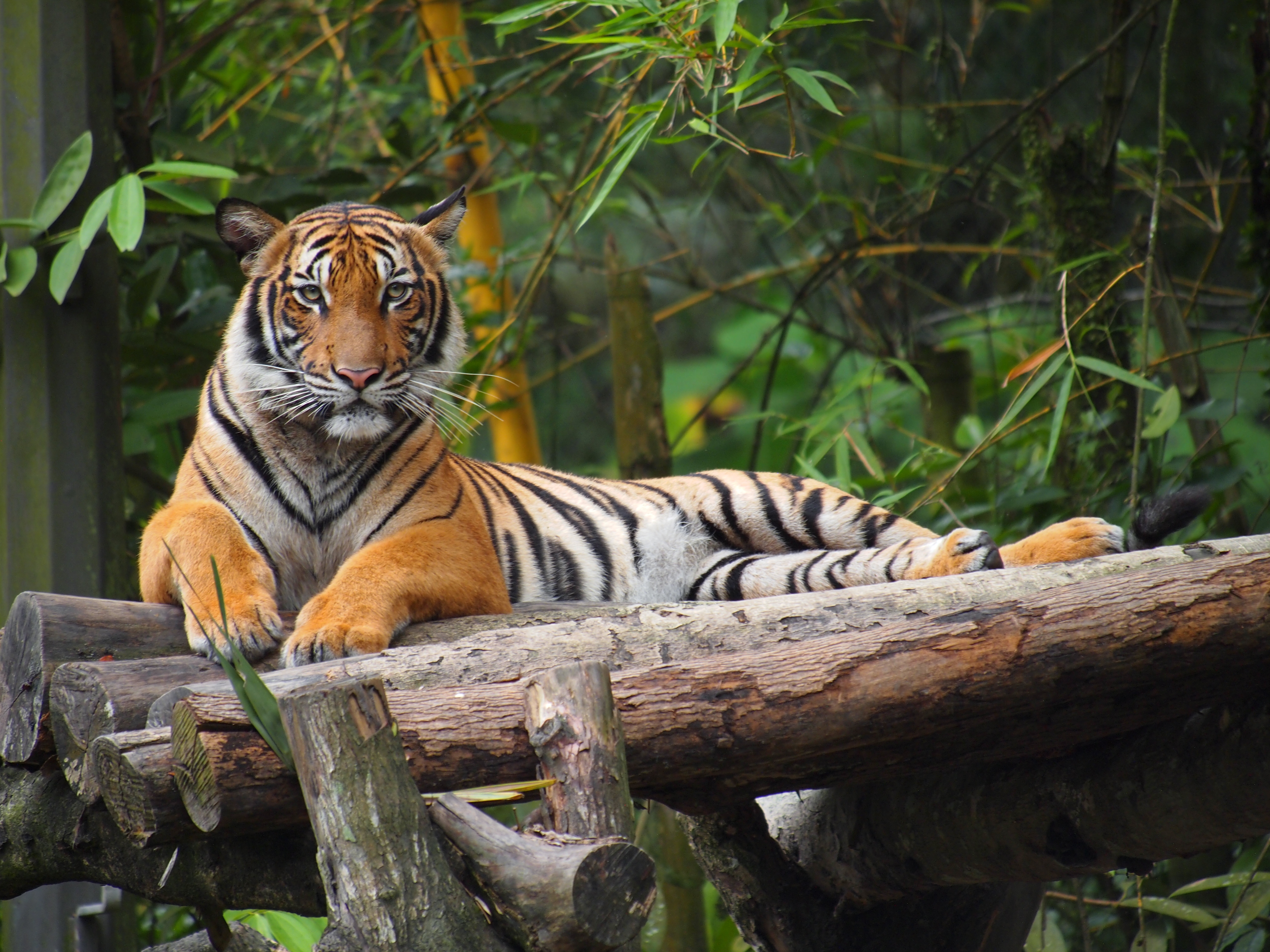
- A Malayan tiger at National Zoo of Malaysia

Conservation status
- Critically Endangered (Department of Wildlife and National Parks Peninsular Malaysia)

Scientific classification
- Kingdom: Animalia
- Phylum: Chordata
- Class: Mammalia
- Order: Carnivora
- Family: Felidae
- Genus: Panthera
- Species: P. tigris
- Subspecies: P. t. tigris
- Population: Malayan tiger
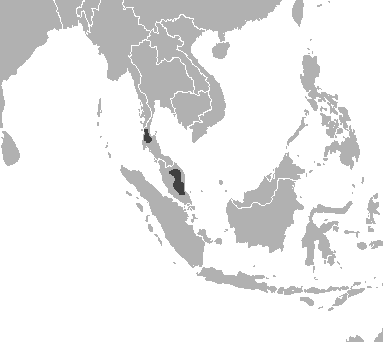
- Range of the Malayan tiger

= Malayan tiger =

Tiger population in Malayan Peninsula

The Malayan tiger is a tiger from a specific population of the Panthera tigris tigris subspecies that is native to Peninsular Malaysia. This population inhabits the southern and central parts of the Malay Peninsula, and has been classified as critically endangered. As of April 2014, the population was estimated at 80–120 mature individuals, with a continuing downward trend.

In the Malay language, the tiger is called harimau, also abbreviated to rimau. It has also been known as the southern Indochinese tiger, to further distinguish it from the Indochinese tiger population to the north in Myanmar and Thailand, which differ genetically from this population.

== Taxonomy ==
Felis tigris was the scientific name used by Carl Linnaeus in 1758 for the tiger. Panthera tigris corbetti was proposed by Vratislav Mazák in 1968 for the tiger subspecies in Southeast Asia. Panthera tigris jacksoni was proposed in 2004 as a subspecies as a genetic analysis indicated differences in mtDNA and micro-satellite sequences to P. t. corbetti. Since revision of felid taxonomy in 2017, the Malayan tiger is recognised as a P. t. tigris population. However, a genetic study published in 2018 supported six monophyletic clades based on whole-genome sequencing analysis of 32 specimens. The Malayan tiger appeared to be distinct from other mainland Asian tiger specimens, thus supporting the concept of six subspecies.

=== Naming ===
When the tiger population of the Malay Peninsula was accepted as a distinct subspecies in 2004, the chairman of the Malaysian Association of Zoos, Parks and Aquaria argued that the new subspecies should be named Panthera tigris malayensis to reflect the geographical region of its range. As a compromise, it received the vernacular name "Malayan tiger", and the scientific name jacksoni, which honours the tiger conservationist Peter Jackson. Nevertheless, P. t. malayensis was used by other authors.

== Characteristics ==
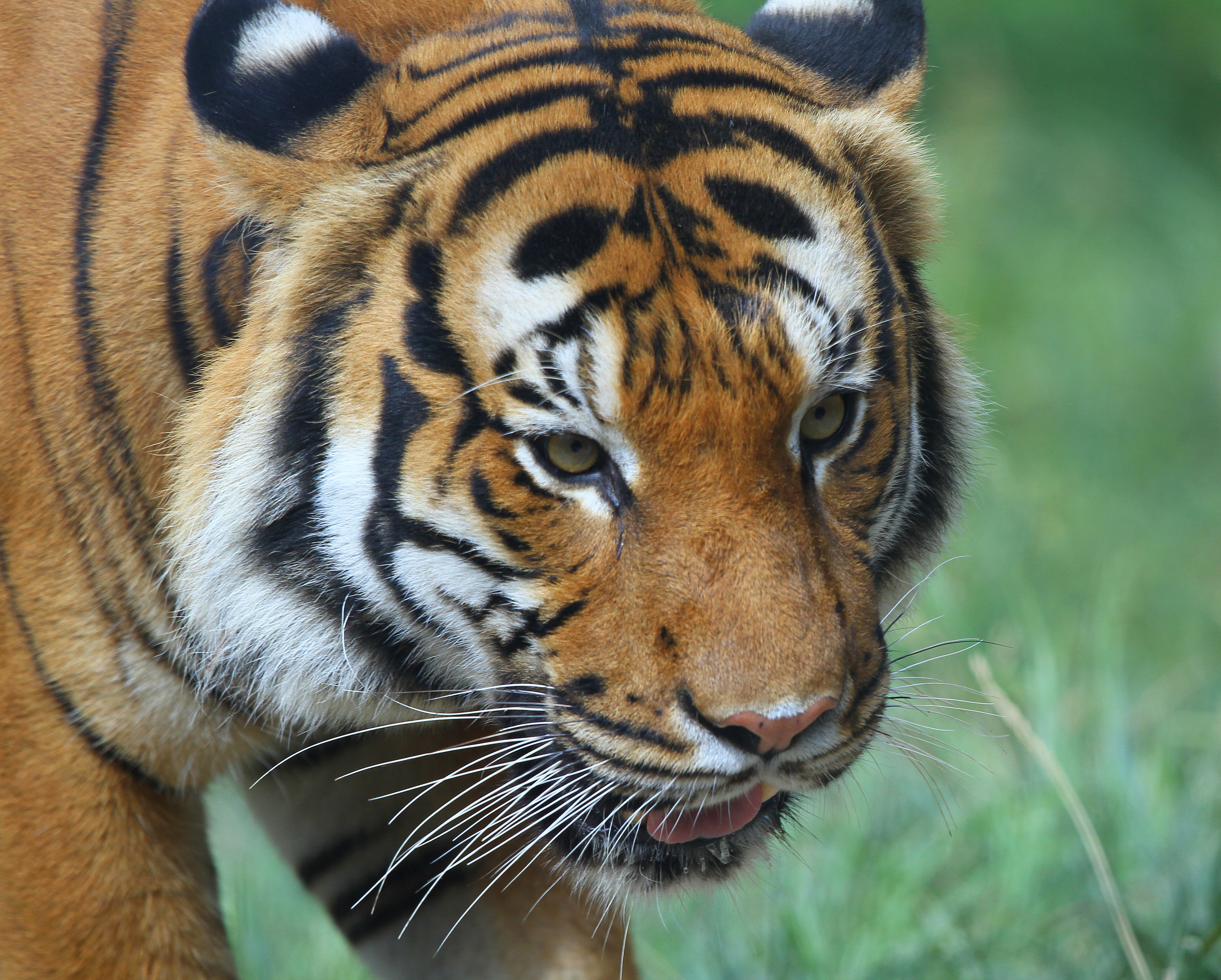
Close up of a tiger's head

There is no clear difference between the Malayan and the Indochinese tiger, when specimens from the two regions are compared cranially or in pelage. No type specimen was designated. Malayan tigers appear to be smaller than Bengal tigers. From measurements of 11 males and 8 females, the average length of a male is 8 ft 6 in (259 cm), and of a female 7 ft 10 in (2.39 m). Body length of 16 female tigers in the State of Terengganu ranged from 70 to 103 in (180 to 260 cm) and averaged 80.1 in (203 cm). Their height ranged from 23 to 41 in (58 to 104 cm), and their body weight from 52 to 195 lb (24 to 88 kg). Data from 21 males showed that total length ranged from 75 to 112 in (190 to 280 cm), with an average of 94.2 in (239 cm). Their height ranged from 24 to 45 in (61 to 114 cm), and their body weight from 104 to 284.7 lb (47.2 to 129.1 kg).

== Distribution and habitat ==
The geographic division between Malayan and Indochinese tigers is unclear as tiger populations in northern Malaysia are contiguous with those in Southern Thailand.

Tigers abounded on Singapore Island in the 1830s when it was still a dense jungle and were also seen crossing the Strait of Johor. The first fatal attack of a tiger on a human was reported in 1831. Tiger hunting became a sport in those years. The expansion of plantations on Singapore Island led to more encounters between humans and tigers; daily tiger attacks were reported in the late 1840s. Local authorities organized tiger bounties, and the tiger population in Singapore decreased significantly. Tigers were extirpated on Singapore Island by the 1950s, and the last one was shot in 1932.

In Malaysia, tiger signs were reported in early-succession vegetation fields between 1991 and 2003, agricultural areas outside forests in Kelantan, Terengganu, Pahang, and Johor, and many riparian habitats outside forests in Pahang, Perak, Kelantan, Terengganu, and Johor. Most of the major rivers that drain into the South China Sea had some evidence of tigers, whereas those draining into the Strait of Malacca in the west did not. The total potential tiger habitat was 66,211 km^{2} (25,564 sq mi), which comprised 37,674 km^{2} (14,546 sq mi) of confirmed tiger habitat, 11,655 km^{2} (4,500 sq mi) of expected tiger habitat and 16,882 km^{2} (6,518 sq mi) of possible tiger habitat. All the protected areas greater than 402 km^{2} (155 sq mi) in size had tigers.

In September 2014, two conservation organisations announced that camera trap surveys in seven sites in three separate habitats from 2010 to 2013 had produced an estimate of the surviving population of 250–340 individuals, with a few additional isolated small pockets probable. The decline meant that the population might have to be moved to the "Critically Endangered" category in the IUCN Red List. As of 2019, poaching and depletion of prey has caused the tiger population in Belum-Temengor Forest Reserve to decline about 60% over a period of 7–8 years, from approximately 60 to 23.

== Ecology and behaviour ==
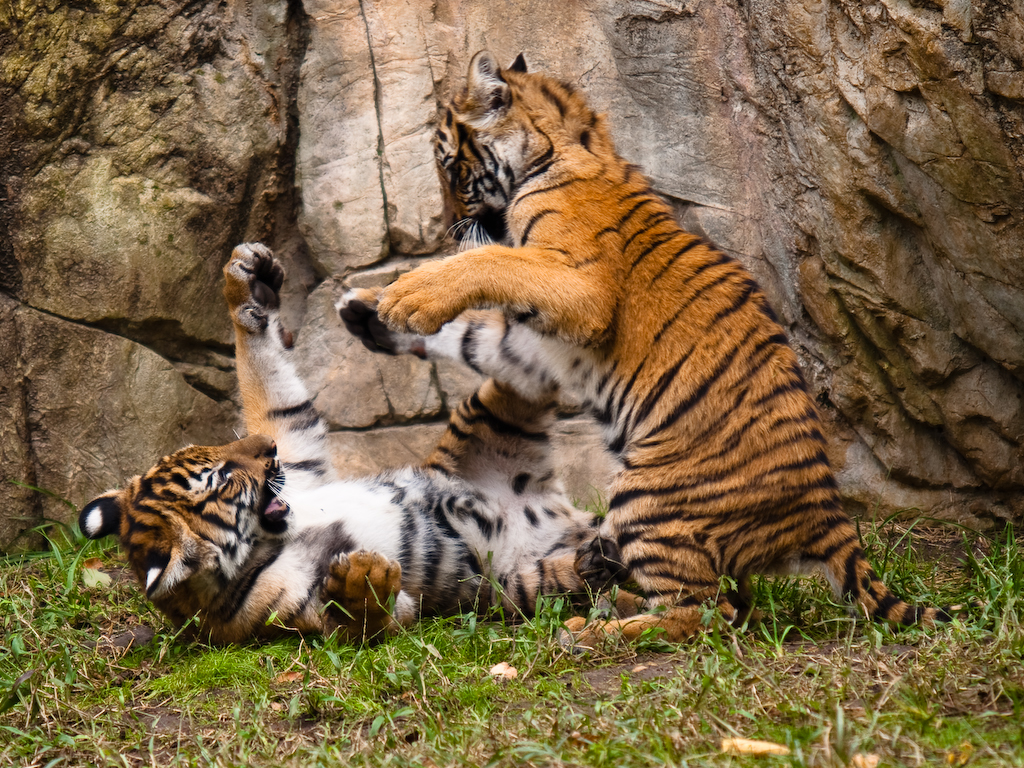
Two female cubs playing together

Malayan tigers prey on sambar deer, barking deer, Indian hog deer, wild boar, Bornean bearded pig and mainland serow, as well as Asian black bear, Asian Elephant calves and sun bear.

== Threats ==
Habitat fragmentation because of development projects and agriculture is a serious threat. Between 1988 and 2012, an area of about 13,500 km^{2} (5,200 sq mi) natural forest was lost in Peninsular Malaysia. Nearly 64,800 km^{2} (25,000 sq mi) was converted to large-scale industrial plantations, primarily for palm oil production. An area of around 8,300 km^{2} (3,200 sq mi) constituted prime tiger habitat.

Commercial poaching occurs at varying levels in all tiger range states. In Malaysia there is a substantial domestic market in recent years for tiger meat and manufactured tiger bone medicines. Between 2001 and 2012, body parts from at least 100 tigers were confiscated in Malaysia. In 2008, police found 19 frozen tiger cubs in a zoo. In 2012, skins and bones of 22 tigers were seized. The demand for tiger body parts used in Chinese traditional medicine apparently also attracts poachers from Vietnam, Thailand and Cambodia. Between 2014 and 2019, anti-poaching units removed around 1,400 snares from protected areas.

== Conservation ==
The tiger is included on CITES Appendix I, banning international trade. All tiger range states and countries with consumer markets have banned domestic trade as well. The Malaysian Conservation Alliance for Tigers (MYCAT) is "an alliance of non-governmental organisations comprising the Malaysian Nature Society, Traffic Southeast Asia, Malaysia Programme of the Wildlife Conservation Society and World Wide Fund for Nature Malaysia." MYCAT has a goal of increasing the tiger population. The alliance also includes the Department of Wildlife and National Parks. In 2007, they implemented a hotline to report tiger-related crimes, such as poaching. In order to deter poaching, they organize "Cat Walks", a citizen patrol in danger zones.

In November 2021, the Cabinet of Malaysia announced the initiation of nine conservation strategies through 2030 to ensure the survival of the Malayan tiger; these include enforcement of patrols, preservation and conservation of the Malayan tiger's natural habitat, establishment of a National Task Force for its conservation under the Department of Wildlife and National Parks Peninsular Malaysia's Tiger Conservation Unit; the wildlife crime bureau under the Royal Malaysia Police and the National Wildlife Forensics Laboratory were emboldened for its ex situ conservation, and provisions for a Malayan tiger habitat accreditation schemes enabled. The government also cooperates with zoos and universities in other countries to further research into inbreeding, and establishes a Malayan Tiger conservation centre to temporarily accommodate tigers before releasing them into the wild. The moratorium ban on deer hunting was extended further.

== Cultural references ==
The Malayan tiger is the national animal of Malaysia. In Emilio Salgari's cycle of novels on the 19th century fictional pirate Sandokan, the protagonist is known as "The Tiger of Malaysia".

== See also ==
- Tiger populations
  - Mainland Asian populations
    - Bengal tiger
    - Caspian tiger
    - Indochinese tiger
    - Siberian tiger
    - South China tiger
  - Sunda island populations
    - Bali tiger
    - Bornean tiger
    - Javan tiger
    - Sumatran tiger
  - Prehistoric tigers: Panthera tigris soloensis
  - Panthera tigris trinilensis
  - Panthera tigris acutidens
- Holocene extinction
