= FELDA Mempaga =

Coordinates: 3°32′23.1″N 101°58′00.5″E

FELDA Mempaga is one of the FELDA settlements in Bentong District, Pahang, Malaysia. The Federal Land Development Authority is a Malaysian government agency handling the resettlement of rural poor into newly developed areas. The Mempaga Correctional Centre (Pusat Serenti Mempaga) is one of the government agencies in the settlement.

== List of FELDA settlements ==
1. FELDA Mempaga 1
2. FELDA Mempaga 2
3. FELDA Mempaga 3
