= Kuala Semantan =

Malaysian town

Coordinates: 3°56′22″N 101°50′27″E

Kuala Semantan كوالا سمنتن
- Town
- Flag
- Interactive map of Kuala Semantan
- Country: Malaysia
- State: Pahang Darul Makmur
- District: Temerloh District

Government
  - Body: Temerloh Municipal Council (Majlis Perbandaran Temerloh)

Area
  - Total: 271 km^{2} (105 sq mi)

Population (2020)
  - Total: 51,290
- Postcode: 28000
- Calling code: +609-2
- Vehicle registration: C
- MP: Nor Azmi Mat Ludin(BN) Hassanuddin Salim(PAS)

Kuala Semantan (alternately Koler Semantan, كوالا سمنتن Jawi: , Pahang Malay: Kuala Semantan) is a town, a mukim (commune) and a state assembly constituency in Temerloh District in central Pahang, Malaysia. It is 5 km (3.1 mi) northwest from downtown Temerloh and 87 km (54 mi) northeast from Kuala Lumpur.
