= Department of Wildlife and National Parks Peninsular Malaysia =

Government department

Department of Wildlife and National Parks of Peninsular Malaysia
- Jabatan Perlindungan Hidupan Liar dan Taman Negara (PERHILITAN); Semenanjung Malaysia جابتن ڤرليندوڠن هيدوڤن ليار دان تامن نڬارا

Department overview
- Formed: 1896 (1972)
- Preceding Department: Game Department (Jabatan Mergastua)
- Type: Federal government (Peninsular)
- Jurisdiction: Government of Malaysia
- Headquarters: Km 10, Jalan Cheras, 56100 Kuala Lumpur, Malaysia. Tel: 03-90866800
- Motto: Wildlife For Future Generations (Hidupan Liar Untuk Generasi Akan Datang)
- Minister responsible: Arthur Joseph Kurup, Minister of Natural Resources, Environment and Climate Change
- Deputy Minister responsible: Syed Ibrahim Syed Noh, Deputy Minister of Natural Resources, Environment and Climate Change
- Department executive: Dato’ Fakhrul Hatta bin Musa, Director-General
- Parent Department: Ministry of Water, Land and Natural Resources
- Website: www.wildlife.gov.my

Footnotes
- Department of Wildlife and National Parks Peninsular Malaysia on Facebook

The Department of Wildlife and National Parks of Peninsular Malaysia (Malay: Jabatan Perlindungan Hidupan Liar dan Taman Negara Semenanjung Malaysia; Jawi: جابتن ڤرليندوڠن هيدوڤن ليار دان تامن نڬارا), abbreviated PERHILITAN, is a governmental organisation that is responsible for the protection, management and preservation of wildlife and national parks in Peninsular Malaysia.

The department was established under the Wildlife Protection Act, 1972 which consolidated all the state game departments in Peninsular Malaysia. As of 2006, the department is placed under the purview of Malaysian Ministry of Natural Resources and the Environment. It is headed by a director-general and that post is currently held by Dato’ Fakhrul Hatta bin Musa since 5 October 2026.

National parks in Sabah are the responsibility of the Sabah Wildlife Department and Sabah Parks while for Sarawak, it is under Sarawak Forest Corporation.

== See also ==
- List of national parks of Malaysia
- Malaysian Wildlife Law

== Sources ==
- Shepherd, Chris R; Shepherd, Loretta Ann (June 2010). "The trade in Viverridae and Prionodontidae in Peninsular Malaysia with notes on conservation and legislation". Small Carnivore Conservation. 42.
- Karuppannan, K.V; Saaban, S; Firdaus Ariff, A.R; Mustappa, A.R (January 2013). "NON-SURGICAL CASTRATION IN CONTROLING [sic] LONG TAILED MACAQUE (Macaca fascicularis) POPULATION BY DEPARTMENT OF WILDLIFE AND NATIONAL PARKS (DWNP) PENINSULAR MALAYSIA". Malaysian Journal of Veterinary Research. 4 (1): 33–36.
