= Mentakab–Temerloh Bypass =

Highway bypass in Pahang, Malaysia

Federal Route 2
- Mentakab–Temerloh Bypass

Route information
- Maintained by Malaysian Public Works Department
- Existed: 1978–present
- History: Completed in 1981

Major junctions
- West end: Mentakab
- FT 2 Federal Route 2 FT 87 Federal Route 87; FT 88 Jalan Chatin; FT 10 Federal Route 10
- East end: Temerloh

Location
- Country: Malaysia
- Primary destinations: Kuala Lumpur, Karak, Lanchang, Chenor, Maran, Kuantan

Highway system
- Highways in Malaysia; Expressways; Federal; State

The Mentakab–Temerloh Bypass, Federal Route 2 is a main highway bypass in Pahang, Malaysia.

== History ==
In 1971, the old Temerloh Bridge spanning across the Pahang River was collapsed due to the huge flood in Temerloh. As a result, the Malaysian Public Works Department (JKR) constructed a 575-m replacement bridge known as the Sultan Ahmad Shah Bridge FT2 beside the old bridge. The Sultan Ahmad Shah Bridge was much higher than the old bridge, forming the first grade-separated interchange in Pahang that was linked to the Federal Route 10. The new bridge project also included a new roadway that bypassed Temerloh and Mentakab, causing the former Temerloh-Mentakab section to be re-gazetted as the Federal Route 87. The construction of the Sultan Ahmad Shah Bridge was completed in 1974.

== Junction lists ==
The entire route is located in Temerloh District, Pahang.

Legend:

- I/C - Interchange, I/S - Intersection, RSA - Rest and service area, OBR - Overhead bridge restaurant, R/R - Restaurant and rest plaza, L/B - Layby, V/P - Vista point, TN - tunnel, T/P - Toll plaza, BR - Bridge
- C - Cloverleaf, S - Stack, T-A - Trumpet-A, T-B - Trumpet-B, DT - Directional-T/Y, SDT - Semi-Directional-T/Y, P-Y - Partial-Y, D - Diamond, P-C - Partial cloverleaf, D-D - Diverging diamond, D-R - Direct ramp

Location	km	mi	Exit	Name	Destinations	Notes
Mentakab			Through to FT 2 Malaysia Federal Route 2			
Mentakab			233	Mentakab (West) I/S	FT 87 Malaysia Federal Route 87 – Mentakab, Jerantut, Taman Negara East Coast Expressway / AH141 – Kuala Lumpur, Kuantan, Kuala Terengganu	T-junctions
Mentakab				Earth Station, Malaysian Remote Sensing Agency (MRSA)	Earth Station, Malaysian Remote Sensing Agency (MRSA) (Formerly known as Malaysian Centre of Remote Sensing (MACRES)	T-junctions
Mentakab			Railway crossing bridge			
Temerloh			234	Temerloh Industrial Park I/S	FT 88 Jalan Chatin – Kampung Chatin, Mentakab, Kolej Komuniti Mentakab; Jalan Industri Temerloh – Taman Industri Temerloh	Junctions
Temerloh				Taman Tualang Indah		
Temerloh				Kampung Tualang		
Temerloh				Kampung Pulau Kujan		
Temerloh				Kampung Bukit Kelulut		
Temerloh			Viaduct			
Temerloh			236	Temerloh I/C	FT 87 Malaysia Federal Route 87 – Town Centre, Mentakab, Jerantut, Taman Negara East Coast Expressway / AH141 – Kuala Lumpur, Kuantan, Kuala Terengganu; FT 10 Malaysia Federal Route 10 – Bera, Teriang, Bahau, Gemas, Segamat, Bera Lake	Roundabout and parcelo interchange
Temerloh			Temerloh Rest and Service Area (westbound)			
Temerloh			Sungai Pahang Bridge; Sultan Ahmad Shah Bridge (Temerloh Bridge)			
Temerloh			Through to FT 2 Malaysia Federal Route 2			
1.000 mi = 1.609 km; 1.000 km = 0.621 mi: Concurrency terminus
