= Malaysia Federal Route 87 =

Road in Malaysia

Federal Route 87
- Jalan Mentakab–Temerloh

Route information
- Maintained by Malaysian Public Works Department
- Length: 15.65 km (9.72 mi)

Major junctions
- West end: Mentakab (South)
- FT 2 Federal Route 2 FT 88 Federal Route 88; FT 98 Federal Route 98; FT 10 Federal Route 10; FT 2 Mentakab–Temerloh Bypass
- East end: Temerloh

Location
- Country: Malaysia
- Primary destinations: Mentakab, Jerantut, Taman Negara

Highway system
- Highways in Malaysia; Expressways; Federal; State

Federal Route 87, or Jalan Mentakab–Temerloh, is a main federal road in Pahang, Malaysia. The 15.6 km (9.7 mi) roads connects Mentakab until Temerloh. The roads was called Federal Route 2 before Mentakab–Temerloh Bypass was built in 1978.

== Route background ==
The Kilometre Zero of the Federal Route 87 starts at Mentakab South, at its interchange with the Federal Route 2, the main trunk road of central Peninsular Malaysia.

== History ==
In 1971, the old Temerloh Bridge spanning across the Pahang River collapsed due to the huge flood in Temerloh. As a result, the Malaysian Public Works Department (JKR) constructed a 575-m replacement bridge known as the Sultan Ahmad Shah Bridge FT2 beside the old bridge. The Sultan Ahmad Shah Bridge was much higher than the old bridge, forming the first grade-separated interchange in Pahang that was linked to the Federal Route 10. The new bridge project also included a new roadway that bypassed Temerloh and Mentakab, causing the former Temerloh–Mentakab section to be re-gazetted as the Federal Route 87. The construction of the Sultan Ahmad Shah Bridge was completed in 1974.

== Features ==
At most sections, the Federal Route 87 was built under the JKR R5 road standard, allowing maximum speed limit of up to 90 km/h (56 mph).

== Junction lists ==
The entire route is located in Temerloh District, Pahang.

Legend:

- I/C - Interchange, I/S - Intersection, RSA - Rest and service area, OBR - Overhead bridge restaurant, R/R - Restaurant and rest plaza, L/B - Layby, V/P - Vista point, TN - tunnel, T/P - Toll plaza, BR - Bridge
- C - Cloverleaf, S - Stack, T-A - Trumpet-A, T-B - Trumpet-B, DT - Directional-T/Y, SDT - Semi-Directional-T/Y, P-Y - Partial-Y, D - Diamond, P-C - Partial cloverleaf, D-D - Diverging diamond, D-R - Direct ramp

Location	km	mi	Name	Destinations	Notes
Mentakab	0.0	0.0	Mentakab (West)	FT 2 Malaysia Federal Route 2 – Kuala Lumpur, Karak, Lanchang; FT 2 Mentakab–Temerloh Bypass – Temerloh, Maran, Kuantan, Earth Station, Malaysian Remote Sensing Agency (MRSA)	T-junctions
Mentakab			Start/End of dual carriageway		
Mentakab			Taman Saga		
Mentakab			Kampung Batu Kapur		
Mentakab			Taman Bendera		
Mentakab			Railway crossing bridge		
Mentakab			Mentakab railway station		T-junctions
Mentakab			Abu Bakar Mosque	Abu Bakar Mosque	
Mentakab			Mentakab		
Mentakab			Mentakab	Jalan Tun Razak – Kampung Melayu	Town Centre; Junctions
Mentakab			Mentakab		
Mentakab			Mentakab	FT 88 Malaysia Federal Route 88 – Kampung Chatin, Kuala Lumpur, Kuantan, Kolej Komuniti Mentakab, Earth Station, Malaysian Remote Sensing Agency (MRSA) (Formerly known as Malaysian Centre of Remote Sensing (MACRES))	Junctions
Mentakab			Kampung Catin		
Mentakab			Kampung Batu Dua		
Mentakab			Kampung Sungai Dingin		
Temerloh			Kampung Tok Embun		
Temerloh			Semantan	FT 98 Malaysia Federal Route 98 – Jerantut, Taman Negara East Coast Expressway / AH141 – Kuala Lumpur, Kuantan, Kuala Terengganu; Jalan Sri Kemuning – Kampung Batu Tiga	Junctions
Temerloh			Tanjung Lalang		
Temerloh			Taman Chengal		
Temerloh			Sungai Chengal bridge		
Temerloh			Taman Temerloh Jaya	Jalan Temerloh Jaya – Taman Temerloh Jaya	T-junctions
Temerloh			Kampung Paya Kechil		
Temerloh			Super Cowboy Supermarket		
Temerloh			Taman Seri Chengal; Al-Mukmin Study Centre; Chengal Muslim Cemetery	Taman Seri Chengal – Marrybrown Restaurant; Al-Mukmin Study Centre, Temerloh; Chengal Muslim Cemetery (* Grave of Sudirman Arshad, Malaysia's People Singer)	
Temerloh			Kampung Carak Paya Dalam		
Temerloh			Kampung Batu Satu	Kampung Bukit Pak Silap	T-junctions
Temerloh			McDonald's Drive Thru	McDonald's	
Temerloh			Taman Bahagia	Jalan Bahagia 7 – Taman Bahagia; Jalan Aman	Junctions
Temerloh			Temerloh	Jalan Tan Sri Yahya – Town Centre, Temerloh Bus and Taxi Terminal, Temerloh Lake Gardens, Esplanade Temerloh, Temerloh District and Land Office, Temerloh District Mosque, Sultan Haji Ahmad Shah Hospital	T-junctions
Temerloh			Kampung Sungai Rabit		
Temerloh			Start/End of dual carriageway		
Temerloh			Temerloh	FT 2 Mentakab–Temerloh Bypass – Kuala Lumpur, Karak, Lanchang, Earth Station, Malaysian Remote Sensing Agency (MRSA) Chenor, Maran, Kuantan, Sultan Haji Ahmad Shah Hospital	Roundabout and Parcelo interchange
Temerloh			Through to FT 10 Malaysia Federal Route 10		
1.000 mi = 1.609 km; 1.000 km = 0.621 mi: Route transition
