= Malaysia Federal Route 88 =

Road in Malaysia

Federal Route 88
- Jalan Chatin

Route information
- Maintained by Malaysian Public Works Department
- Length: 5.67 km (3.52 mi)

Major junctions
- North end: Mentakab
- FT 87 Federal Route 87; FT 2 Mentakab–Temerloh Bypass
- South end: FT 2 Mentakab–Temerloh Bypass

Location
- Country: Malaysia
- Primary destinations: Kampung Chatin

Highway system
- Highways in Malaysia; Expressways; Federal; State

Federal Route 88, or Jalan MACRES, is a main federal road in Pahang, Malaysia. The road connects Mentakab to Mentakab-Temerloh Bypass (Federal Route 2).

== Route background ==
The Kilometre Zero of the Federal Route 88 starts at Mentakab.

== Features ==
At most sections, the Federal Route 88 was built under the JKR R5 road standard, allowing maximum speed limit of up to 90 km/h.

== Junction lists ==
The entire route is located in Temerloh District, Pahang.

Legend:

- I/C - Interchange, I/S - Intersection, RSA - Rest and service area, OBR - Overhead bridge restaurant, R/R - Restaurant and rest plaza, L/B - Layby, V/P - Vista point, TN - tunnel, T/P - Toll plaza, BR - Bridge
- C - Cloverleaf, S - Stack, T-A - Trumpet-A, T-B - Trumpet-B, DT - Directional-T/Y, SDT - Semi-Directional-T/Y, P-Y - Partial-Y, D - Diamond, P-C - Partial cloverleaf, D-D - Diverging diamond, D-R - Direct ramp

| Location | km | mi | Name | Destinations | Notes |
|---|---|---|---|---|---|
| Mentakab | 0.0 | 0.0 | Mentakab | FT 87 Malaysia Federal Route 87 – Town Centre, Temerloh, Jerantut, Taman Negara East Coast Expressway / AH141 – Kuala Lumpur, Kuantan, Kuala Terengganu | T-junctions |
| Mentakab | | | Mentakab | | |
| Mentakab | | | Kampung Chatin | | |
| Mentakab | | | SK Mentakab (Chatin) | Sekolah Kebangsaan Mentakab (Chatin) | |
| Mentakab | | | Kolej Komuniti Mentakab | Kolej Komuniti Mentakab | |
| Mentakab | 5.7 | 3.5 | Mentakab–Temerloh Bypass | FT 2 Mentakab–Temerloh Bypass – Kuala Lumpur, Karak, Lanchang, Chenor, Maran, Kuantan; Jalan Industri Temerloh – Taman Industri Temerloh | Junctions |
1.000 mi = 1.609 km; 1.000 km = 0.621 mi
