= Sultan Ahmad Shah III Bridge =

Sungai Pahang Bridge Jambatan Sultan Ahmad Shah III (Jambatan Chenor)
- Carries: Motor vehicles, Pedestrians
- Crosses: Pahang River
- Locale: Jalan Jambatan Chenor
- Official name: Sultan Ahmad Shah III Bridge (Chenor Bridge)
- Maintained by: Malaysian Public Works Department (JKR) Temerloh

Characteristics
- Design: box girder bridge
- Total length: 530 m
- Width: --
- Longest span: --

History
- Designer: Government of Malaysia; Malaysian Public Works Department (JKR)
- Constructed by: Malaysian Public Works Department (JKR)
- Opened: 2006

Sultan Ahmad Shah III Bridge or Chenor Bridge is the main bridge on Pahang River near Temerloh, Pahang, Malaysia. The 530 metre bridge is located near Chenor.

== History ==
The bridge was constructed in 2004 and was completed in 2006 at a cost of RM200 million. It was officially opened on 8 December 2006 by Sultan Ahmad Shah of Pahang.

== See also ==
- Sultan Ahmad Shah Bridge (Temerloh Bridge)
- Sultan Ahmad Shah II Bridge (Semantan Bridge)
