= Pahang River =

River in Pahang, Malaysia

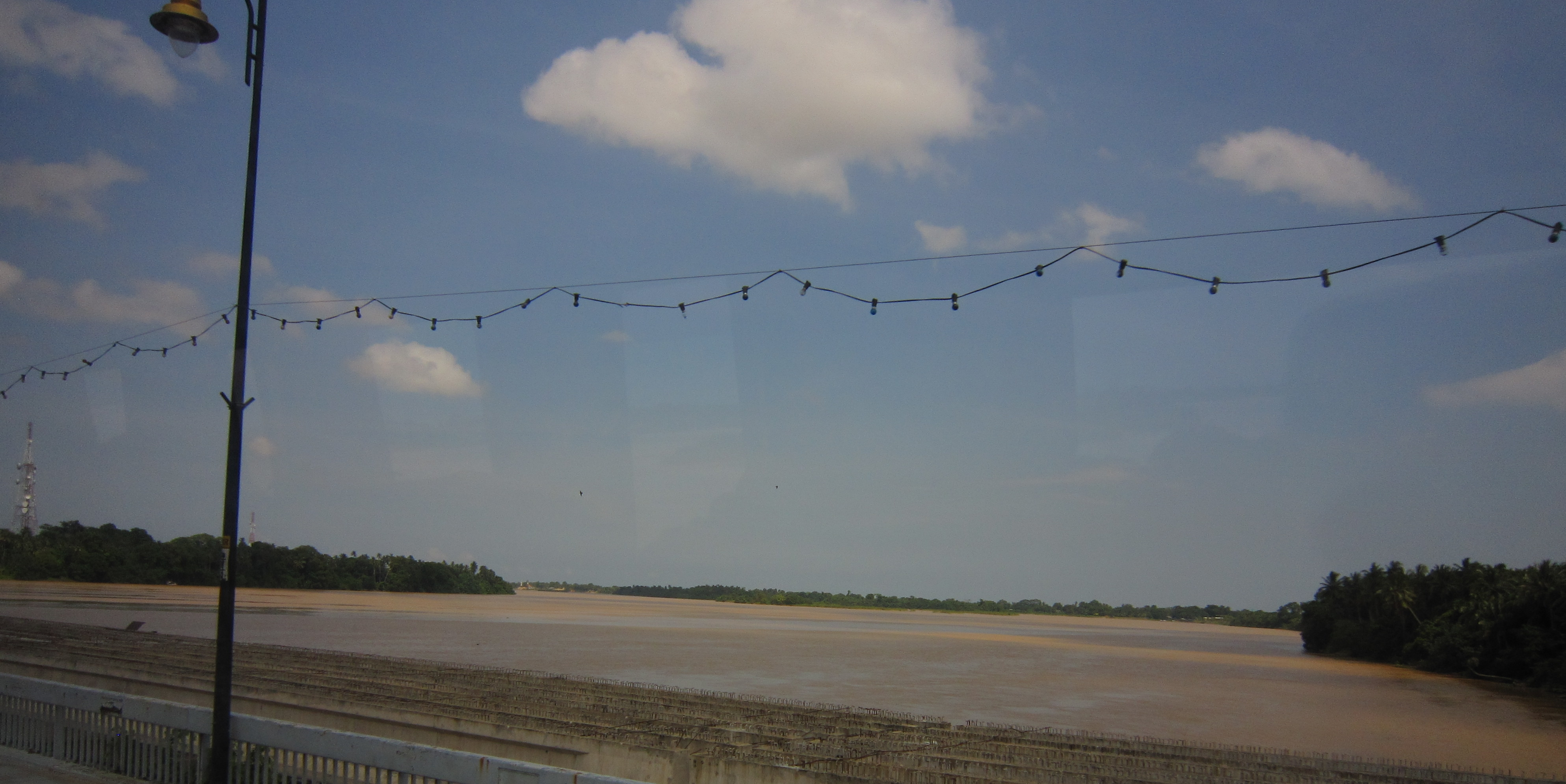
- Mouth of the Pahang, near Pekan
- Native name: Sungai Pahang (Malay)

Location
- Country: Malaysia
- State(s): Pahang and Negeri Sembilan

Physical characteristics
- Source: Jelai River
  - location: Titiwangsa Mountains in Cameron Highlands District
- 2nd source: Tembeling River
  - location: Pantai Timur Mountains in Ulu Tembeling, Jerantut District
- Source confluence: Kuala Tembeling, Jerantut District
- Mouth: South China Sea
  - location: Kuala Pahang, Pekan District
  - coordinates: 3°31′45″N 103°28′07″E
- Length: 459 km (285 mi)
- Basin size: 29,300 km^{2} (11,300 sq mi)
- Discharge
  - average: 596 m^{3}/s (21,000 cu ft/s)

The Pahang River (Malay: Sungai Pahang) mainly flows through the state of Pahang, Malaysia. Its drainage basin covers its namesake state, as well as the neighbouring state of Negeri Sembilan.

At 459 km in length, it is the longest river on the Malay Peninsula.

== Course ==
From the upper slopes of the Titiwangsa Mountains near Cameron Highlands, the Jelai River flows in a southeasterly direction, passing through Padang Tengku and Kuala Lipis before merging with the Tembeling River. The Tembeling, which begins at the Pahang–Terengganu border at Ulu Tembeling within the Pantai Timur Mountains, flows in a southwesterly direction passing through Kuala Tahan. From its confluence near Kuala Tembeling, the Pahang River flows in a southerly direction, passing through Jerantut Feri, Kuala Krau, Kerdau and Temerloh. At Mengkarak, the river takes a turn toward northeast, passing through Chenor and then turning east at Lubuk Paku and Lepar into the floodplains of Paloh Hinai, Pekan and Kuala Pahang before draining into the South China Sea.

=== Basin extent and tributaries ===
From the source to the mouth, the Pahang River basin comprises almost all the districts in Pahang, and eastern Negeri Sembilan. The Pahangese section covers the districts of Cameron Highlands, Lipis, Raub, Jerantut, Temerloh, Bera, Maran, Kuantan and Pekan; while the Negri section comprises the districts of Jelebu and Jempol.

The Lipis River, a tributary of the Jelai, begins at the Pahang–Perak border in Ulu Sungai, Raub district and ends at the confluence with the Jelai at Kuala Lipis. The Semantan River, a tributary of the Pahang, starts in Bentong district and merges with the river at Kuala Semantan. The Lepar River, a tributary of the Pahang, has its source in Kuantan district in the east and merges with the river at Paloh Hinai. The Bera River, a tributary of the Pahang, begins at the namesake district of Bera and merges with the river at Kuala Bera. At the Negri part of the basin, the Triang River, a tributary of the Pahang, begins near Kuala Klawang in the district of Jelebu and merges with the river at Kuala Teriang. The Serting River, a tributary of the Bera, is sourced near Serting Ulu in neighbouring Jempol district and merges with the Bera at Kuala Serting.

The only district in Pahang that does not have a tributary of the Pahang River or have the Pahang River flowing through it is Rompin.

== History ==
The Pahang River has changed course in the past. There is evidence that in the past it exited via Muar.

The banks of the Pahang River were settled as early as 1400 by warriors and seafarers from around Maritime Southeast Asia including places such as Aceh, Riau, Palembang and Sulawesi. The earliest historical records of the Pahang River, the riverine inhabitants or the people of Pahang were found in the Malay Annals and Hikayat Abdullah.

=== Early transportation role ===
The Pahang and Muar Rivers were nearly connected at a place called Jempol, in Negeri Sembilan as the Serting River flows into the Bera River, a tributary of the Pahang River. The Jempol River then flows into the Muar River. Trading boats from the Muar could continue their journey until they reached Kuala Pahang in Pekan, or Kuala Lipis to continue into Terengganu, Kelantan or Perak.

== Natural history ==
During the Pleistocene epoch or Mesolithic period about 10,000 years ago, there was a 5 degrees Celsius drop in the global temperature. At mountaintops, snow accumulated as ice caps and glaciers (including Mount Kinabalu), thus disrupting the global hydrological cycle. Due to lack of water discharge into the sea, the sea level was 120 meters lower than it is today. The South China Sea dried up, exposing the Sunda Shelf and previous deep trenches became huge ancient rivers called the North Sunda River.

Mainland Asia, the Malay Peninsula, Sumatra and Java became connected to Borneo via the landbridge of exposed Sunda Shelf. The North Sunda River provided vital connection to the Mekong River in Vietnam and the Chao Phraya River in Thailand to the north, the Baram and Rajang rivers in Sarawak to the east and the Pahang River and Rompin River to the west of the massive land mass. Freshwater catfishes from those rivers migrated and mated about 10,000 years ago. After the Holocene, when the temperature increased, a substantial amount of the ice that had accumulated melted, increasing sea levels, inundating the landbridges and the Sunda River, thus isolating the catfish populations. Their genetic relations seen in their DNA is evidence of the previous connections of the Pahang River to other isolated rivers in Indochina and Borneo.

== Towns and bridges ==
Jerantut is 15 km from the confluence of the Jelai River and the Tembeling River. Temerloh is situated on the confluence between the Semantan River and Pahang River. The town of Pekan, which is Pahang's royal capital, is situated on the southern bank of the river, near its mouth.

There are seven bridges built across the river. The bridges are the Abu Bakar Bridge in Pekan, the Paloh Hinai bridge of Tun Razak Highway in Paloh Hinai, the Chenor Bridge in Chenor, the new Temerloh Bridge in Temerloh, the Semantan Bridge of East Coast Expressway in Sanggang, the Sultan Ahmad Shah Bridge in Kuala Krau and the Sultan Abdullah Bridge in Jerantut Feri.

Bera is the only district on the Pahang River watershed that has no bridge crossing the river.

== Gallery ==
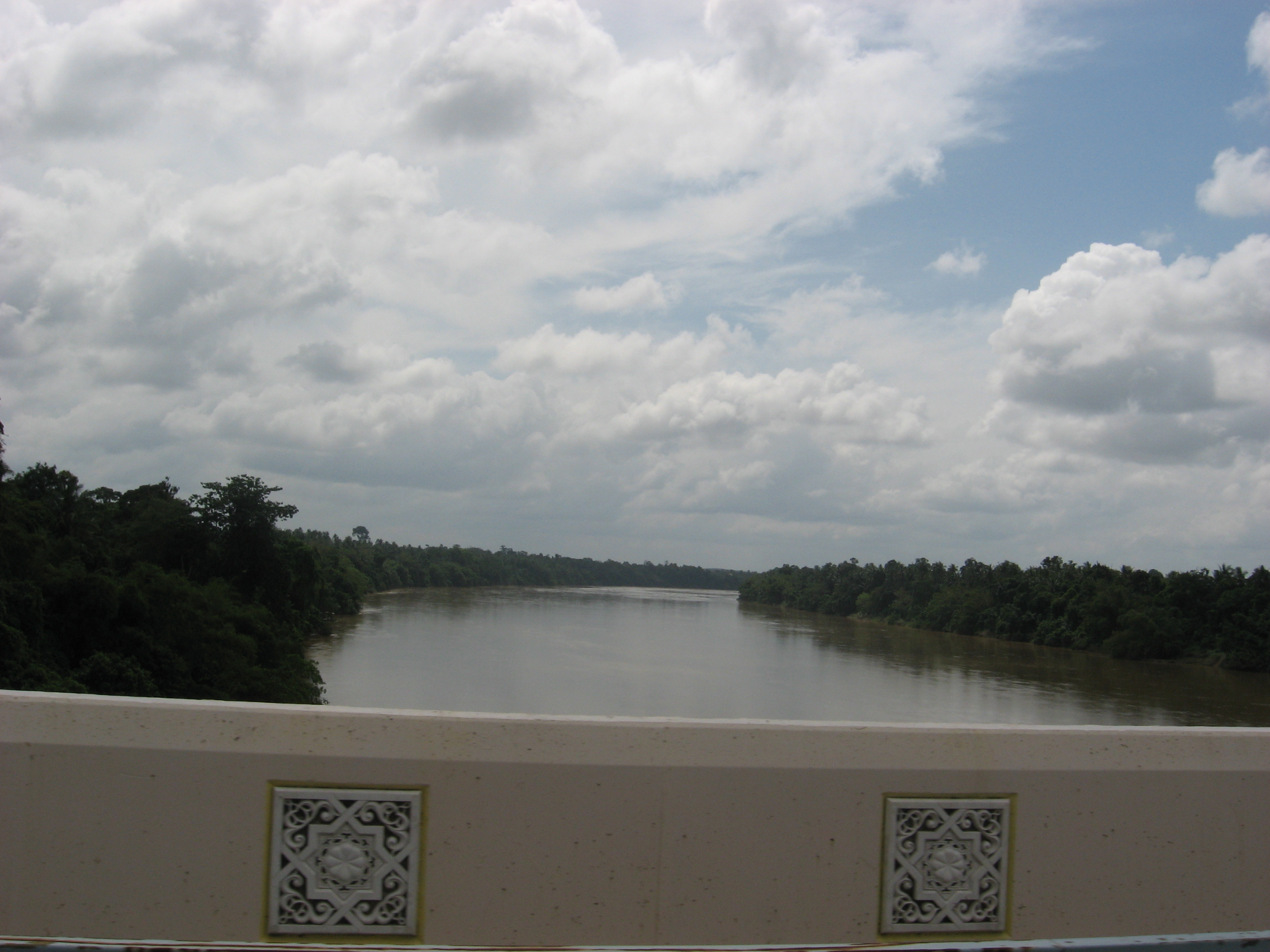
Pahang River near Chenor.

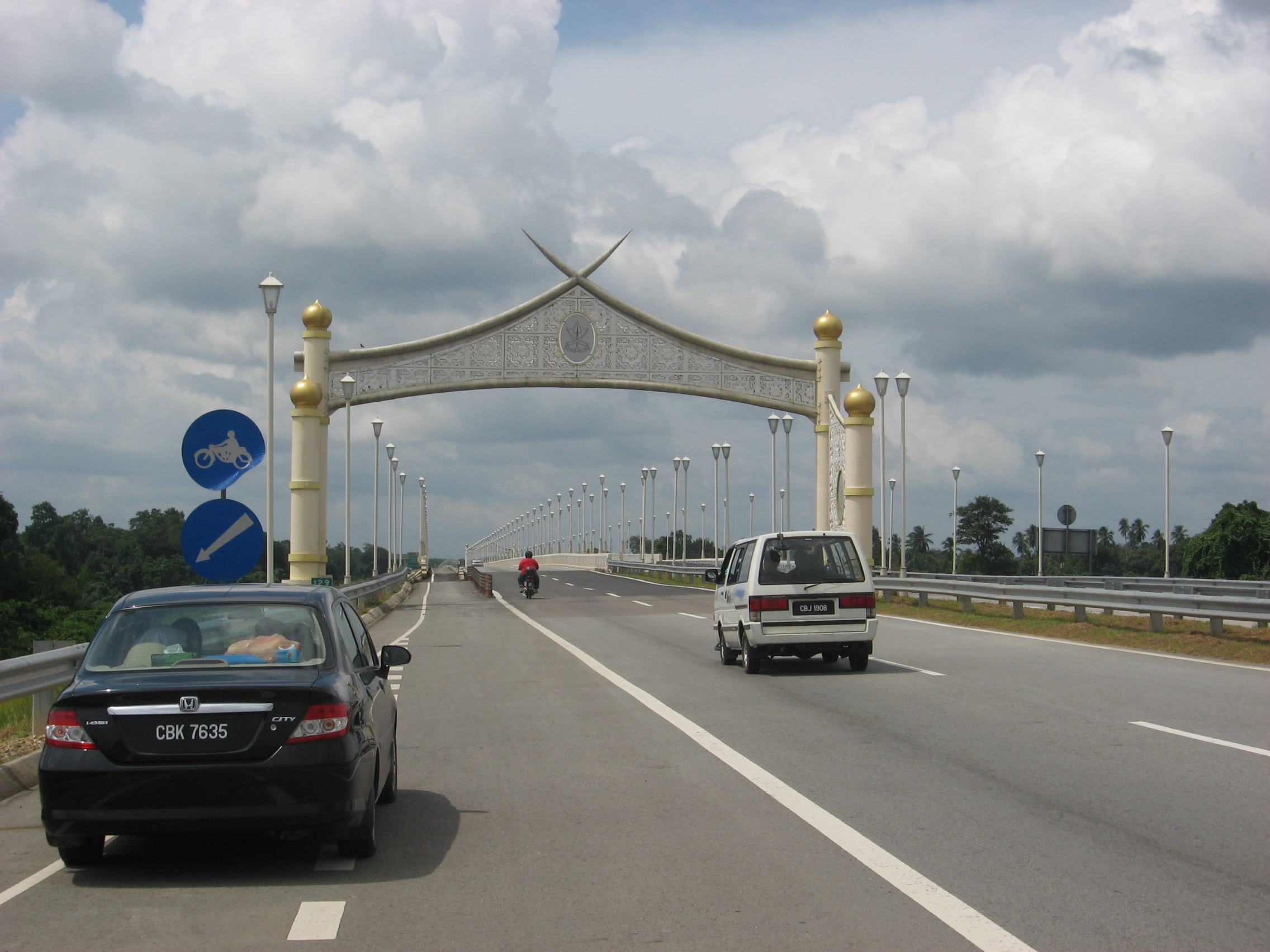
A new concrete bridge over the Pahang River.

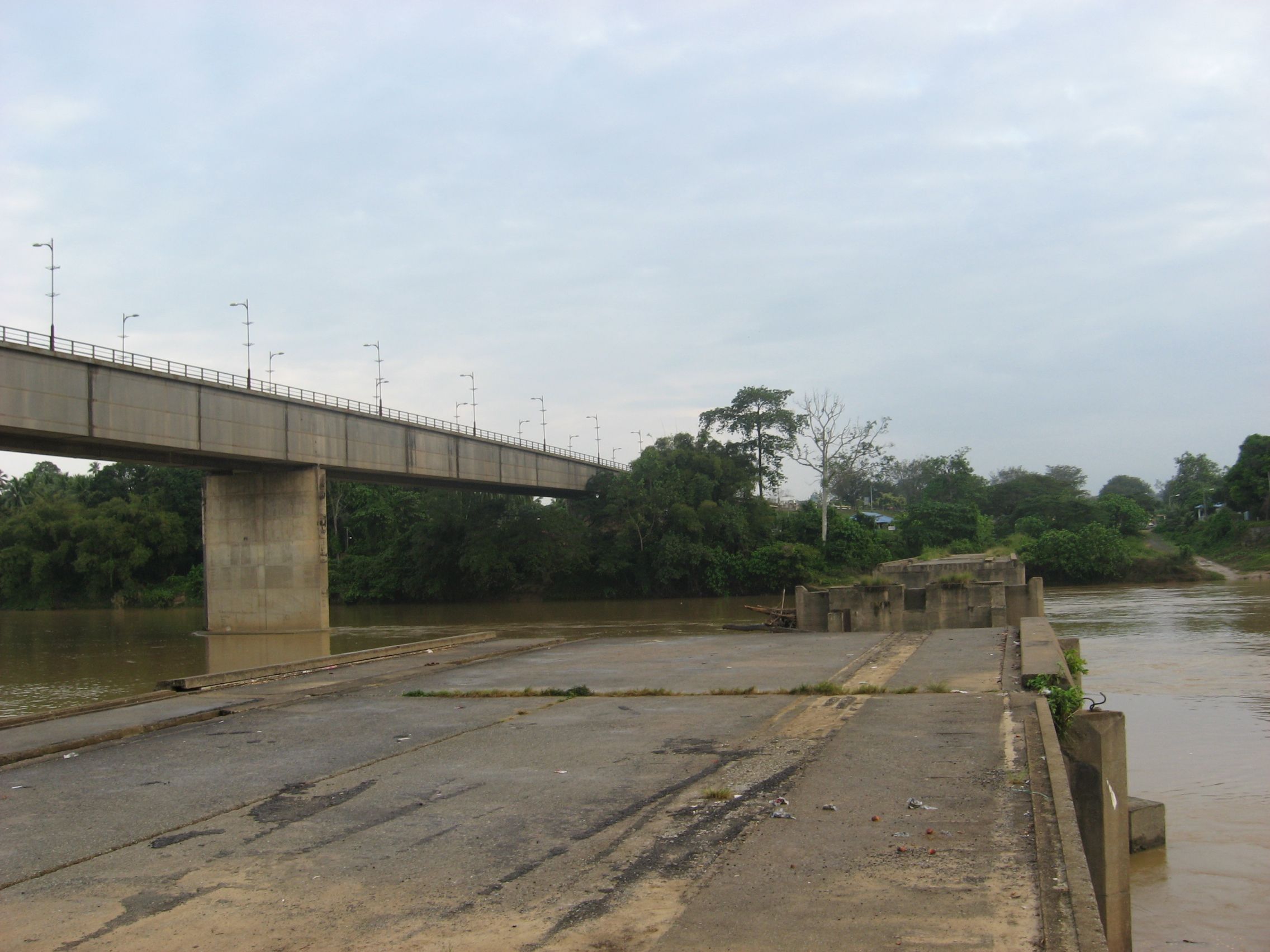
Damaged Temerloh bridge during 1971/72 flood.

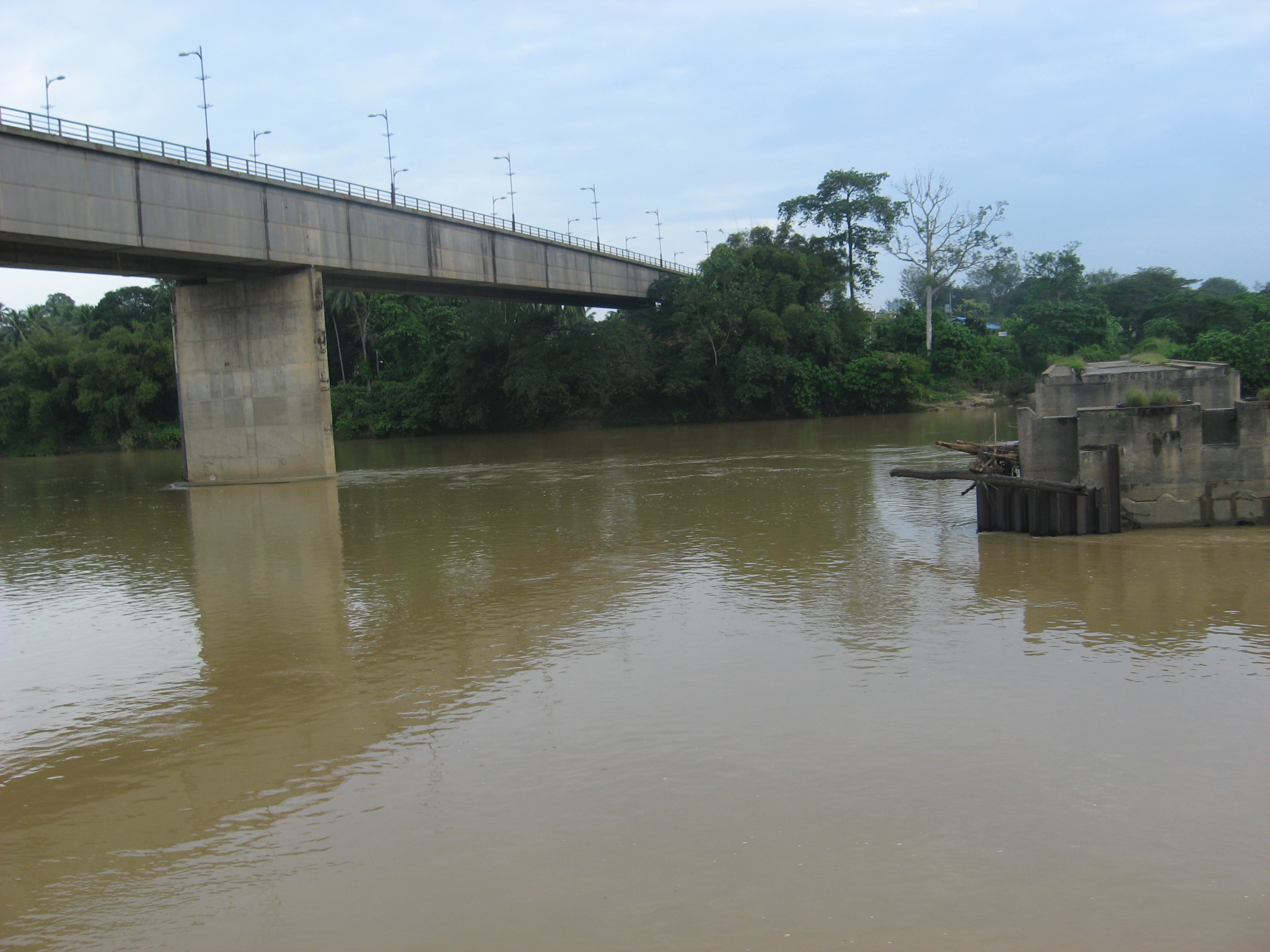
Steel bridge constructed in 1973 near Temerloh.

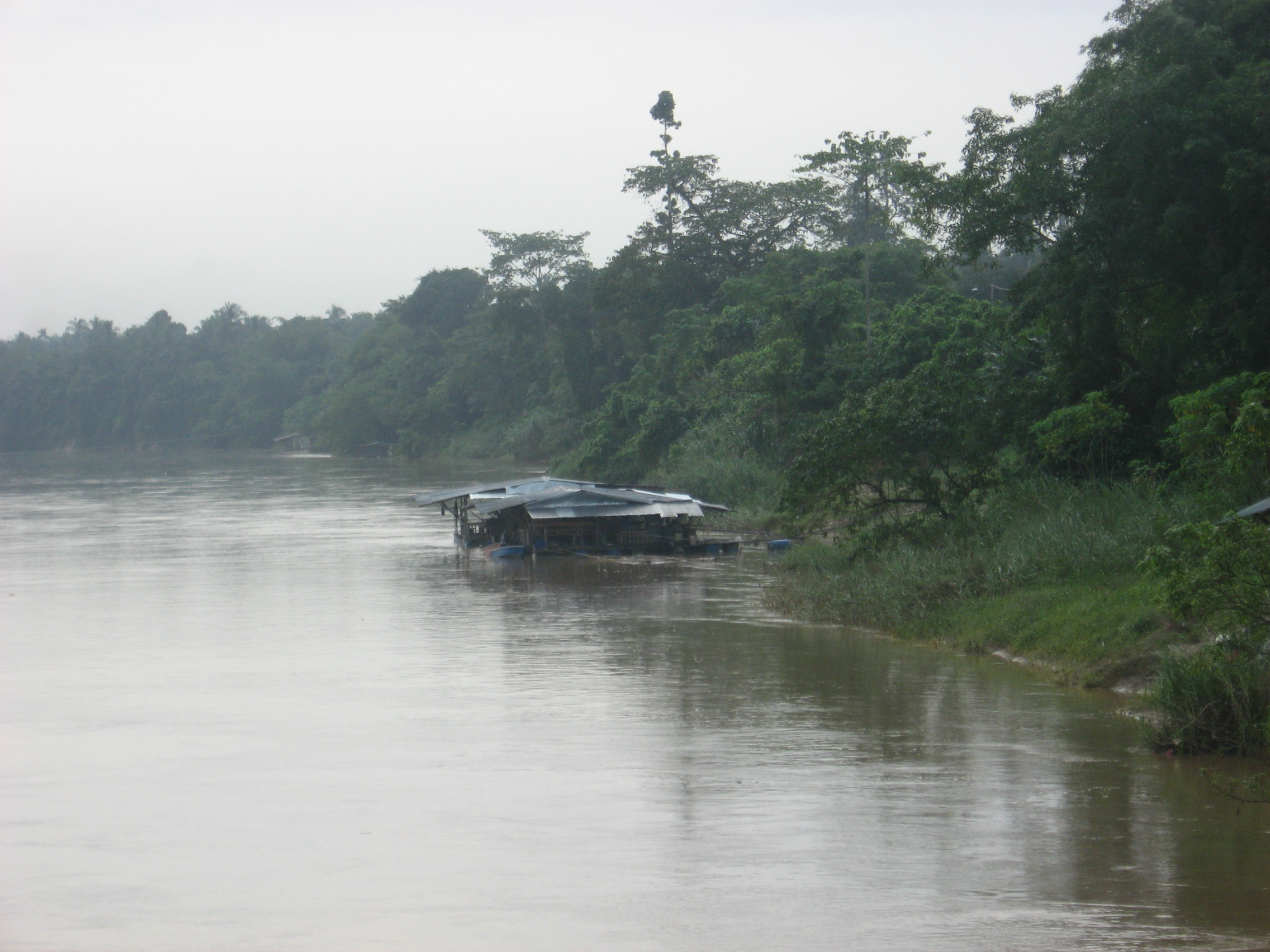
Raft-house on Sungei Pahang near Temerloh town.

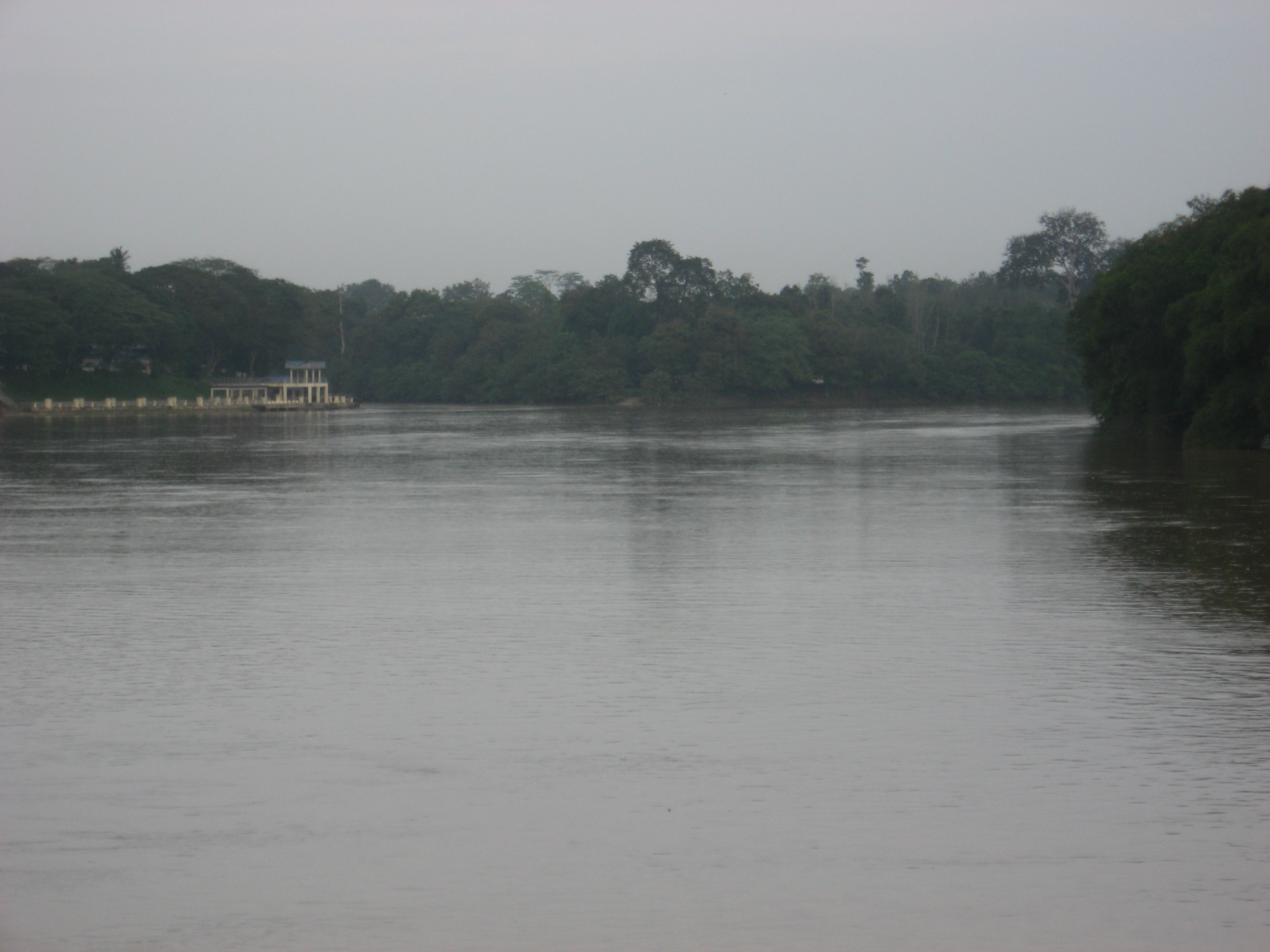
The confluence of Sungei Semantan on the right near Pekan Sari Temerloh.

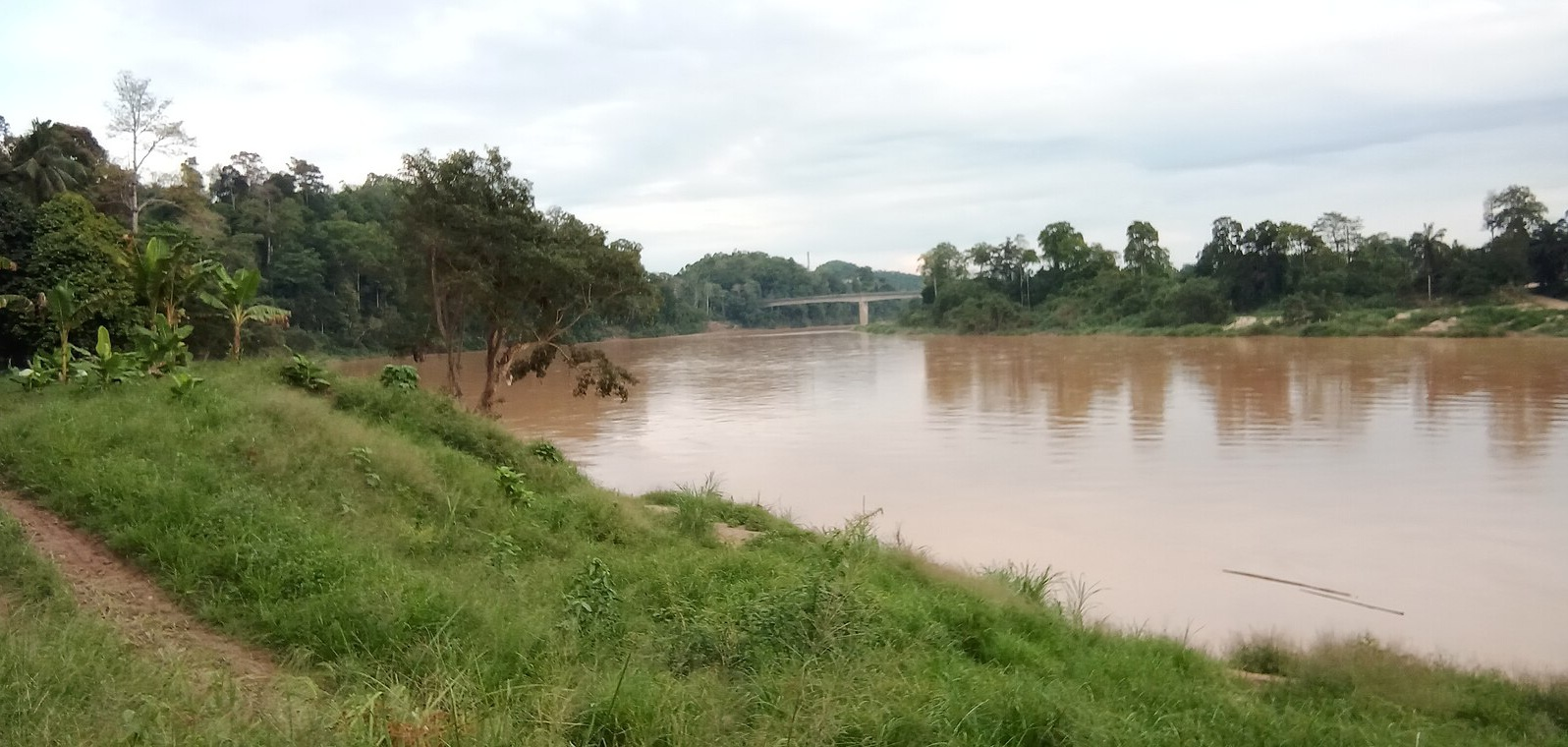
Pahang River in Jerantut with view of Jerantut Feri Bridge.

=== References on Historical Pahang ===
- Sejarah Melayu. 1612-1615. Tun Seri Lanang.
- Yusoff Iskandar, Abdul Rahman Kaeh; W G Shellabear. Sejarah Melayu : satu pembicaraan kritis dari pelbagai bidang.
- Abdullah, W. G. (William Girdlestone) Shellabear. Hikayat Munshi Abdullah bin Abdul Kadir
- Anon. The Hikayat Abdullah.
- A. C Milner. A Missionary : Source for a Biography of Munshi Abdullah.
- Anthony Milner. The Invention of Politics in Colonial Malaya.
- C. M. (Constance Mary) Turnbull The Straits Settlements, 1826-67: Indian Presidency to Crown Colony.
- Journal of the Malayan Branch of the Royal Asiatic Society.
- Journal of the Federated Malay States Museums
- The Selangor Journal: Jottings Past and Present.
- S. L. Wong Exciting Malaysia: A Visual Journey.
- Carl A. Trocki. 1999. Opium, Empire and the Global Political Economy: Asia's Transformations.
- Virginia Matheson Hooker. A Short History of Malaysia: Linking East and West.
- Nicholas Tarling. The Cambridge History of Southeast Asia.
- S. Durai Raja Singam. 1980. Place-names in Peninsular Malaysia.
- Muhammad Haji Salleh. Sajak-Sajak Sejarah Melayu.
- Lucian Boia. Great Historians from Antiquity to 1800: An International Dictionary.
- MacKinnon K, Hatta G, Halim H, Mangalik A.1998. The ecology of Kalimantan. Oxford University Press, London.

== See also ==
- Malaysia
- Pahang
- Laluan Penarikan
- Prehistoric Malaysia
- Pekan District
- Muar River
- Taman Negara National Park
- Malay Peninsula
- Titiwangsa Mountains
