= Sultan Ahmad Shah II Bridge =

Bridge in Malaysia

Sungai Pahang Bridge Jambatan Sultan Ahmad Shah II (Jambatan Semantan) 苏丹阿末沙二世大桥 (士曼丹大桥)
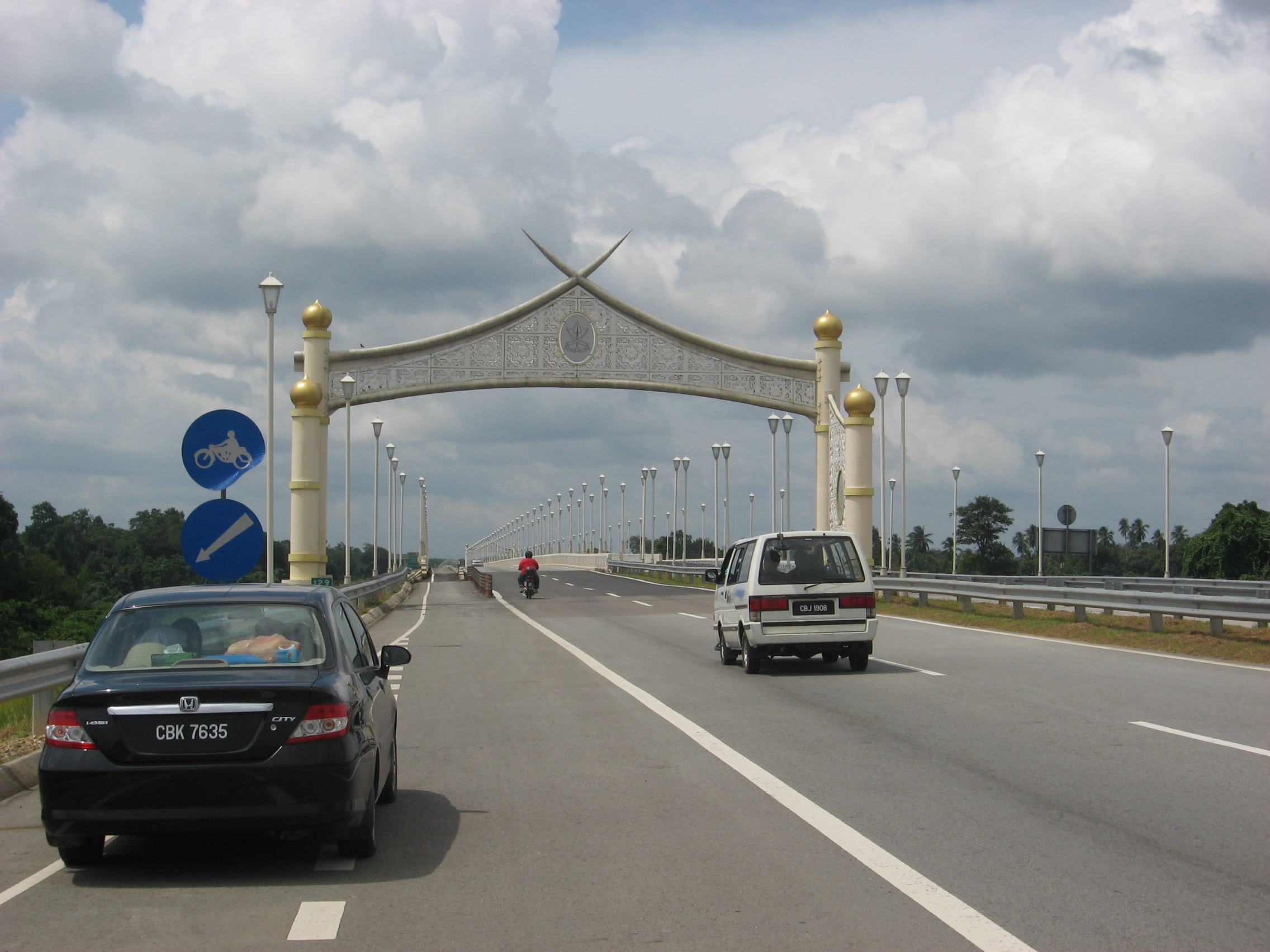
- Coordinates: 3°30′41″N 102°25′52″E
- Carries: Motor vehicles, Pedestrians
- Crosses: Pahang River
- Locale: East Coast Expressway
- Official name: Sultan Ahmad Shah II Bridge (Semantan Bridge)
- Maintained by: ANIH Berhad (formerly MTD Prime Sdn Bhd)

Characteristics
- Design: Arch bridge
- Total length: 700 m
- Width: --
- Longest span: --

History
- Designer: Government of Malaysia; Malaysian Highway Authority (LLM); MTD Infraperdana Sdn Bhd
- Constructed by: MTD Construction Sdn Bhd
- Opened: 2004

Location
- Interactive map of Sungai Pahang Bridge

Sultan Ahmad Shah II Bridge or Semantan Bridge is the longest highway bridge in the East Coast Expressway network. It bridges the Pahang River in Pahang, Malaysia. This 700 m (2,300 ft) bridge was opened when the East Coast Expressway was built. It crosses the Pahang River, the longest river in west Malaysia. At the entrance of the bridge there are 2 elephant trunks which symbolize Pahang. There also many colorful lights around this bridge. This bridge was opened by Sultan of Pahang, Sultan Ahmad Shah on 22 April 2004. Near the bridge is the Temerloh Rest and Service Area (both bound).

== Gallery ==
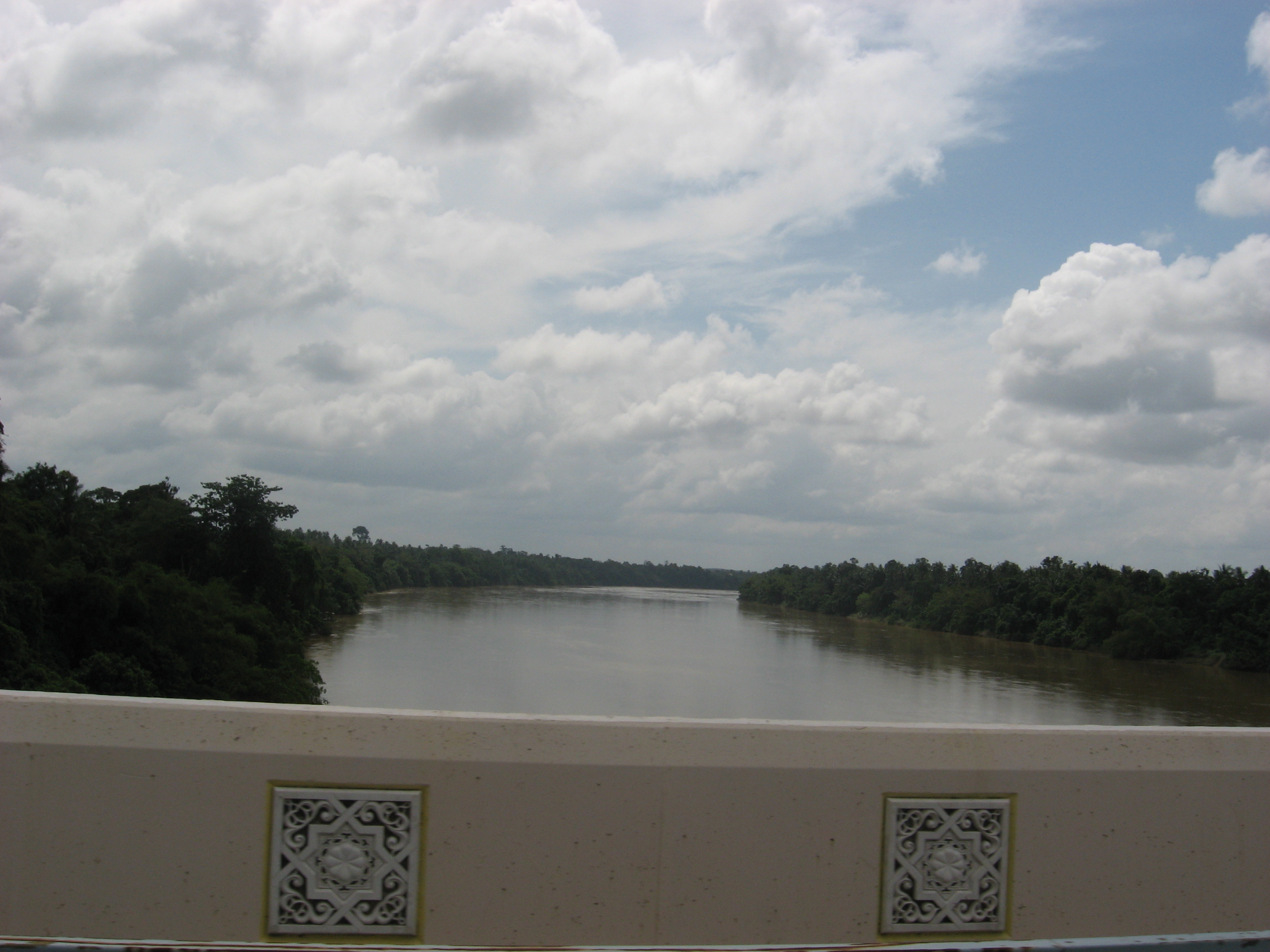
Sungai Pahang near Chenor

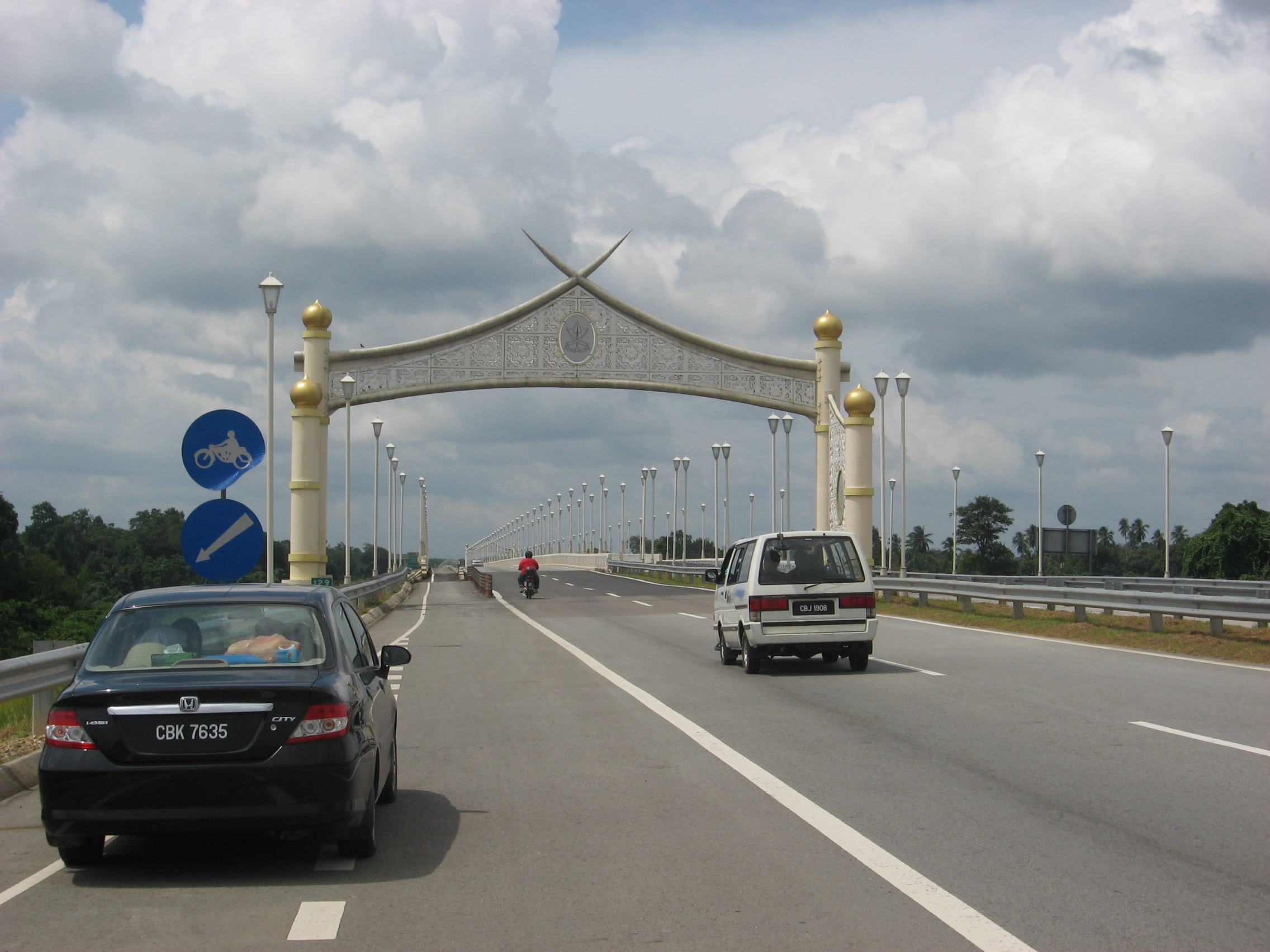
A new concrete bridge over Pahang River

== See also ==
- Sultan Ahmad Shah Bridge (Temerloh Bridge)
- Sultan Ahmad Shah III Bridge (Chenor Bridge)
