= Mentakab railway station =

Train station in Pahang, Malaysia

Coordinates: 3°29′04″N 102°20′36″E

Mentakab

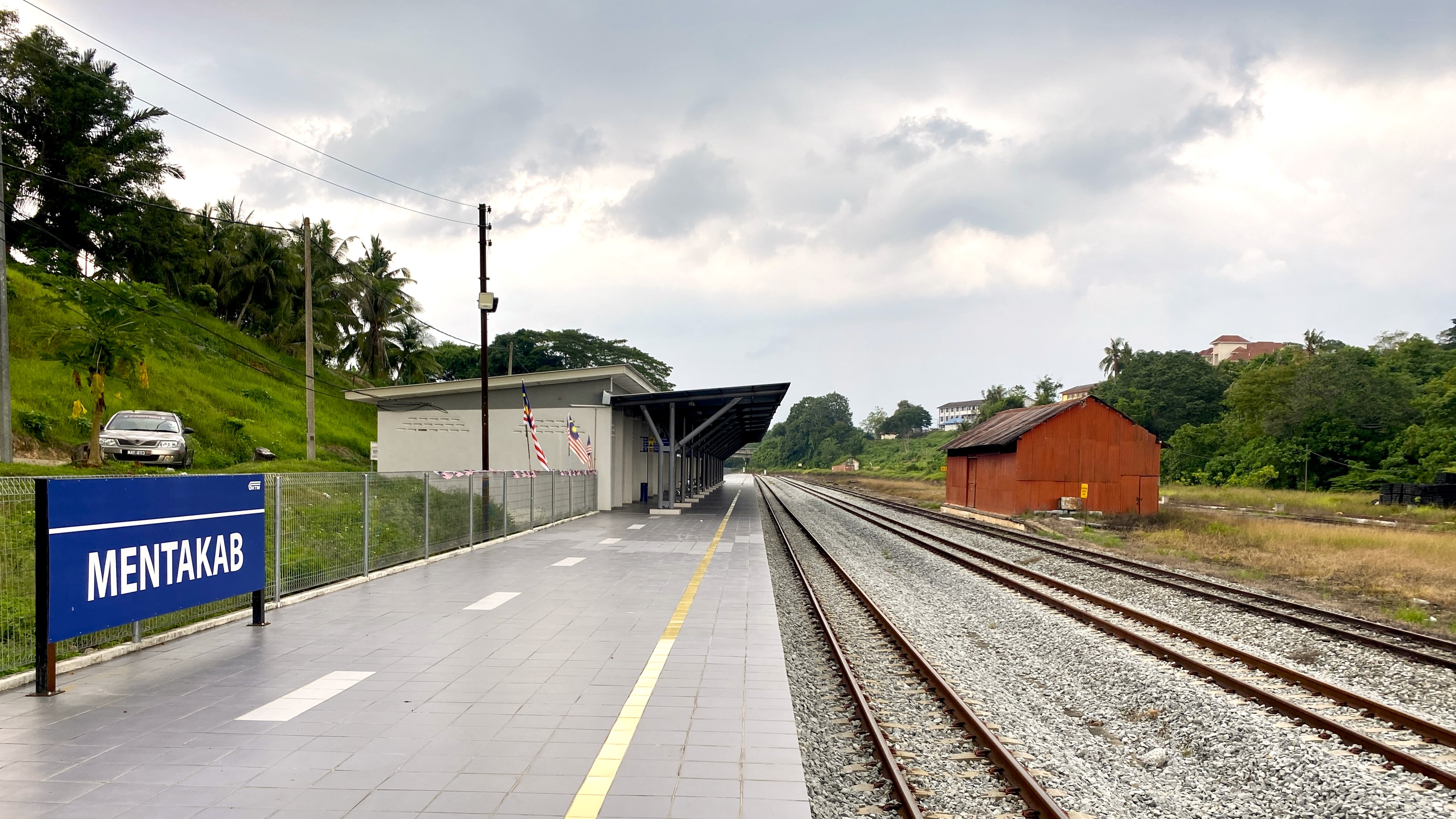

General information
- Other names: Malay: منتاكب (Jawi); Chinese: 文德甲; Tamil: மெந்தகாப்
- Location: Mentakab, Temerloh District; Pahang; Malaysia
- Owner: Railway Assets Corporation
- Operator: Keretapi Tanah Melayu
- Line: East Coast Line
- Platforms: 1 side platform
- Tracks: 3

Construction
- Structure type: At-grade
- Parking: Available, free
- Accessible: Yes

History
- Opened: 1 August 1911

Services
Preceding station	Keretapi Tanah Melayu (Intercity)	Following station
Kuala Krau towards Tumpat	Ekspres Rakyat Timuran	Triang towards Johor Bahru Sentral
Kuala Krau towards Kuala Lipis	Shuttle Timur	Mengkarak towards Gemas
Future services
Preceding station	Malaysia Rail Link	Following station
Bentong towards Westport or Gombak	East Coast Rail Link	Maran towards Kota Bharu
Location

The Mentakab railway station is a Malaysian train station located at and named after the town of Mentakab in the Temerloh District of the state of Pahang. This station also serves the towns of Temerloh, Bentong and Genting Highlands, as the nearest railway station to these places.

The station is one of the major railway stations of Keretapi Tanah Melayu's (KTM) East Coast Line. KTM Intercity shuttle and express trains stop at this station. It will also be an interchange with the future East Coast Rail Link, currently under construction.

== Train services ==
The station is served by the following KTM Intercity services:

- Ekspres Rakyat Timuran 26/27 Tumpat–JB Sentral
- Shuttle Timur 34/35/36/37 Gemas–Kuala Lipis
