= Sultan Ahmad Shah Bridge =

Sungai Pahang Bridge Jambatan Sultan Ahmad Shah (Jambatan Temerloh)
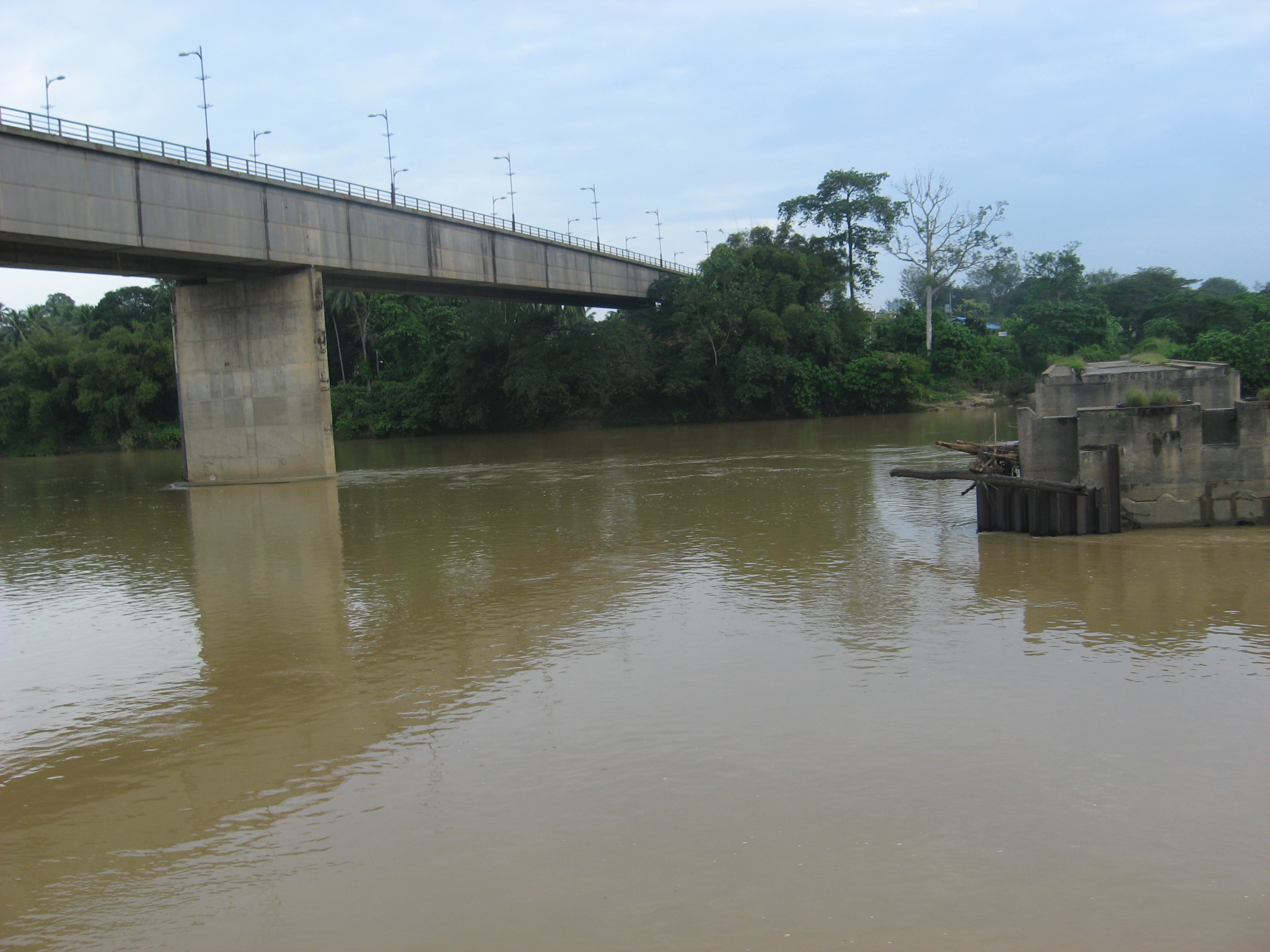
- Coordinates: 3.444224°N 102.427007°E
- Carries: Motor vehicles, Pedestrians
- Crosses: Pahang River
- Locale: Federal Route 2 Jalan Temerloh-Maran
- Official name: Sultan Ahmad Shah Bridge (Temerloh Bridge)
- Maintained by: Malaysian Public Works Department (JKR) Temerloh

Characteristics
- Design: steel viaduct
- Total length: 575 m
- Width: --
- Longest span: --

History
- Designer: Government of Malaysia; Malaysian Public Works Department (JKR)
- Constructed by: Malaysian Public Works Department (JKR)
- Opened: 1974

Sultan Ahmad Shah Bridge or Temerloh Bridge is the main bridge on Pahang River near Temerloh, Pahang, Malaysia. The 575 m bridge is located at Federal route Federal Route 2.

== History ==
In 1971, the old Temerloh Bridge spanning across the Pahang River collapsed due to a massive flood in Temerloh. As a result, the Public Works Department (JKR) constructed a 575-m replacement bridge known as the Sultan Ahmad Shah Bridge FT2 beside the old bridge. The Sultan Ahmad Shah Bridge is much higher than the old bridge, forming the first grade-separated interchange in Pahang that links to the Federal Route 10. The new bridge also links to a new road that bypasses Temerloh and Mentakab townships, causing the former Temerloh-Mentakab section to be re-gazetted as the Federal Route 87. The construction of the Sultan Ahmad Shah Bridge was completed in 1974.

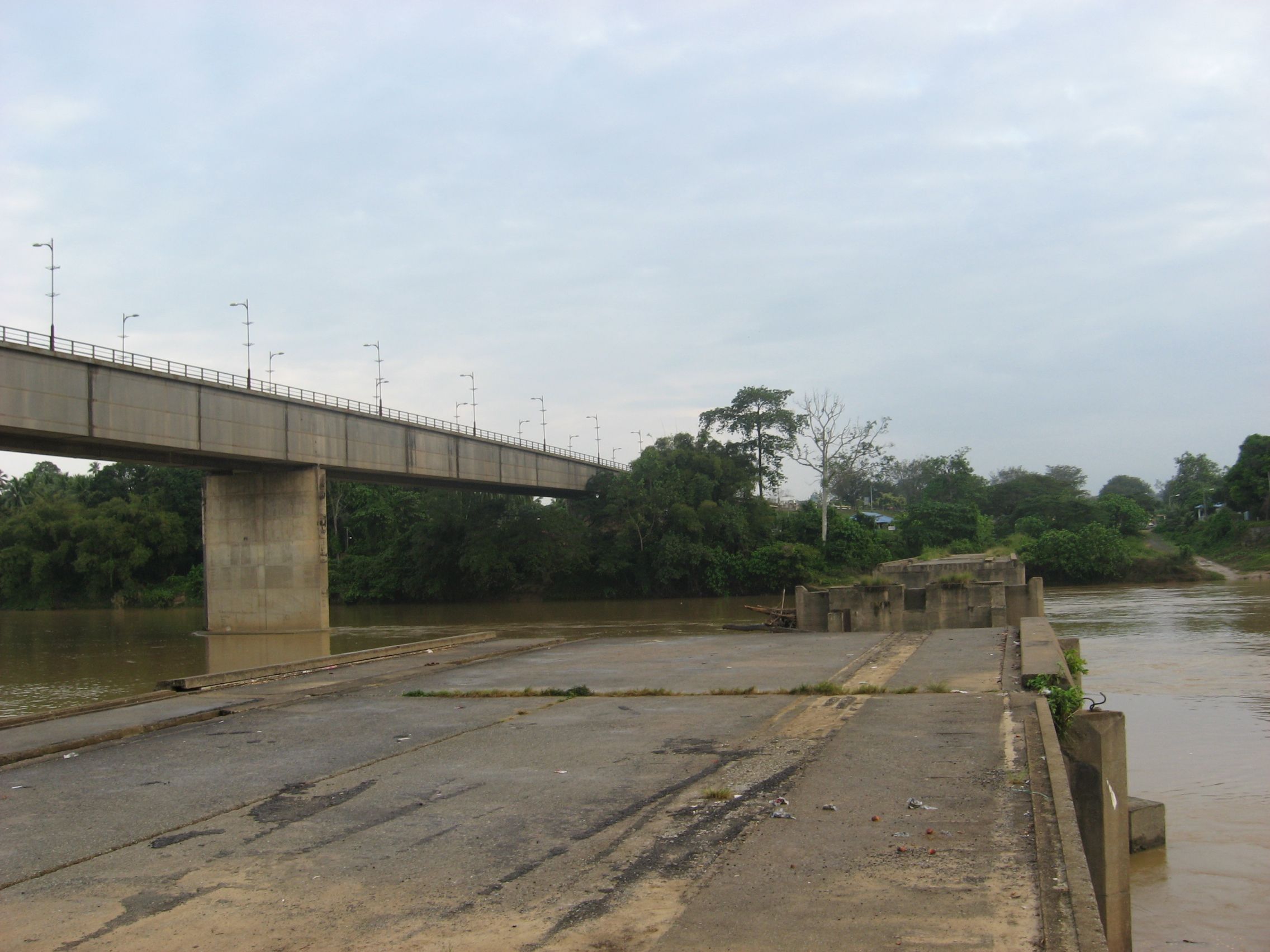
An old Temerloh Bridge near new bridge

== See also ==
- Sultan Ahmad Shah II Bridge (Semantan Bridge)
- Sultan Ahmad Shah III Bridge (Chenor Bridge)
