= Mentakab =

Mentakab Mentekak (Pahang Malay)
- Town

Other transcription(s)
  - Jawi: منتاكب
  - Chinese: 文德甲; Wéndéjiǎ (Hanyu Pinyin)
  - Tamil: மெந்தகாப் Mentakāp (Transliteration)
- Interactive map of Mentakab
- Mentakab in Pahang Mentakab (Malaysia) Mentakab (Southeast Asia)
- Coordinates: 3°29′4.56″N 102°21′1.08″E
- Country: Malaysia
- State: Pahang Darul Makmur
- District: Temerloh District

Government
  - Type: Municipal council
  - Body: Temerloh Municipal Council

Area
  - Total: 1,210 km^{2} (470 sq mi)

Population (2020)
  - Total: 52,018
- Postcode: 28400
- Calling code: +60-9-2
- Vehicle registration: C
- MP: Anuar Tahir (PH) Salamiah Mohd Nor (Parti Islam Se-Malaysia)

Mentakab (alternately Mentekab, Pahang Malay: Mentekak) is a town, a mukim (commune) and a state assembly constituency in Temerloh District in central Pahang, Malaysia. It is 9 km (5.6 mi) northwest from downtown Temerloh and 82 km (51 mi) northeast from Kuala Lumpur.

== History ==
It was originally known as Pasir Rawa. In the late 19th century, Mentakab was a candidate for Pahang's new capital city, replacing Pekan. However, due to its mountainous terrain, Kuala Lipis was instead chosen as the capital of the state in 1898, later replaced by Kuantan in 1955.

== Transport ==
=== Rail ===
Mentakab has a railway station operated by Keretapi Tanah Melayu. The railway station is on the East Coast Line of the KTM Intercity network, running from Gemas in Negeri Sembilan to Tumpat in Kelantan and goes through the railway station in Mentakab. Presently two trains stop at the station daily. The station also serves other nearby towns such as Temerloh, Lanchang, and Karak.

=== Road ===
Mentakab is connected to the constituency centre Temerloh via national highway Federal Route 87.

The original road from Kuala Lumpur to Kuantan (Federal Route 2) also goes through Mentakab which gives Mentakab an important role. Travelers used to recognize the famous round-about near Jalan Tun Razak-Jalan Temerloh intersection every time they reached the town. However, the iconic round-about has been replaced by a traffic light. The role of route 2 has now been superseded by the East Coast Expressway East Coast Expressway, which connects Gombak in Selangor to Kuala Terengganu via Kuantan. The nearest exit from the East Coast Expressway is at Temerloh.

== Economy and infrastructure ==
=== Agriculture ===
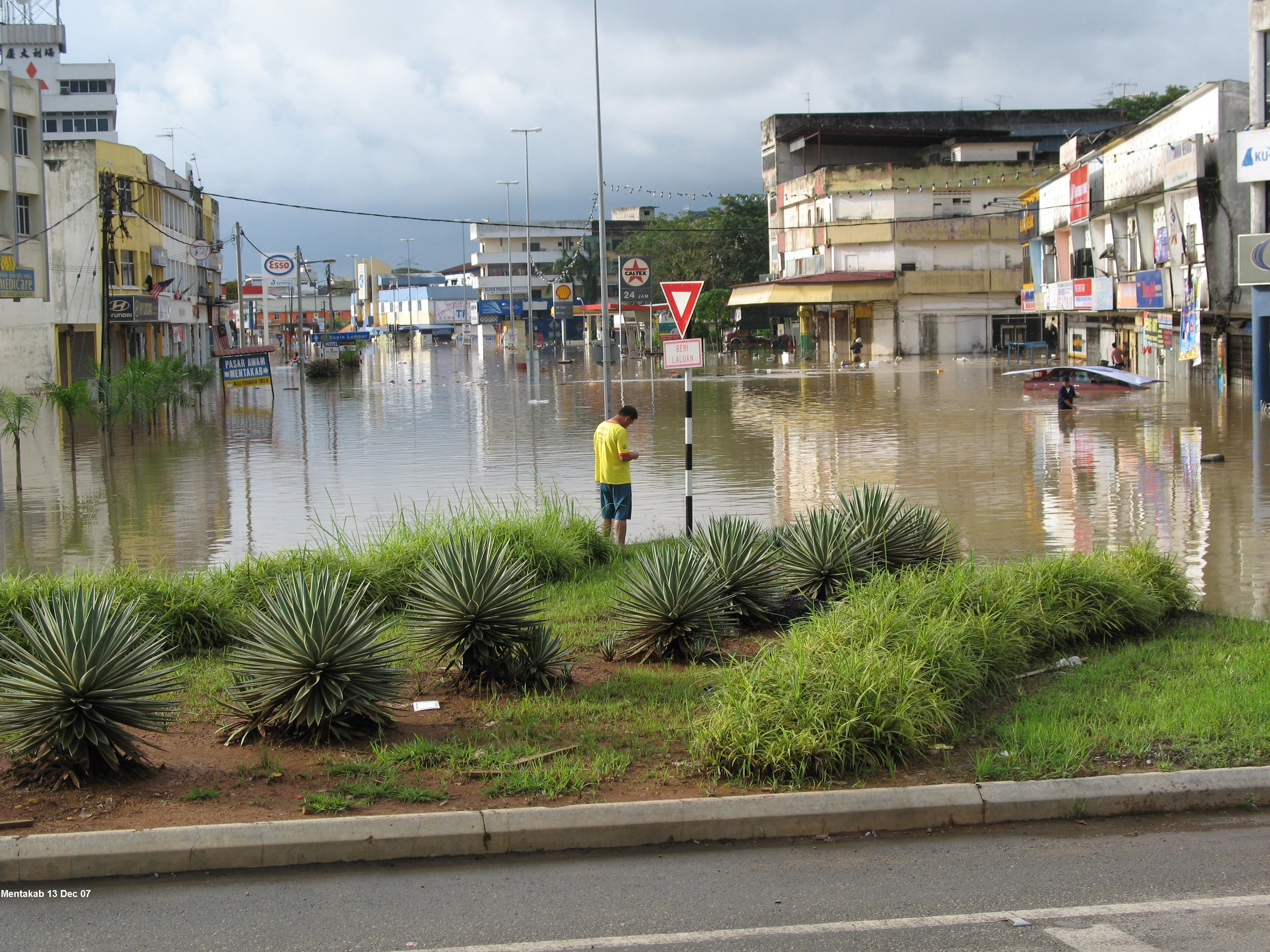
13 December 2007, Mentakab during flood.

Mentakab is a popular site for urban swiftlet farming; the top floor of many shoplots in the city are modified to provide space for swiftlet farming. Successful urban farming can be rewarding as each kilogram of swiftlets' nest can be sold for as high as US$2000. However, few have succeeded and disadvantages towards urban residents can potentially outweigh economic gains such as widespread of diseases or bird flu and excessive bird droppings. The Semantan River that goes through the town is the water source for the agricultural activities.

Other than in 1970, Mentakab is seldom caught in serious floods prior to 2000 but serious floodings did occur in 2007, 2014 and 2017. A major flood in December 2021 following Tropical Depression 29W has submerged almost 95% of Mentakab town underwater, caused by floodwater flow-through from prior floodings in Bentong and Raub. The flooding of Mentakab town, as well as many other cities and towns in the country, has been considered as the worst flooding the country has experienced post-independence.

=== Industries ===
Robin Resources (M) Sdn. Bhd. is the only company manufacturing medium-density fibreboard in Pahang since 1995. 100% of workers from Robin Resources (M) Sdn. Bhd. are employed locally and hence provides working opportunities to the local community. 80% of the manufactured medium-density fibreboard from Robin Resources are exported to the international market, including countries such as Saudi Arabia and China. Malaysian Newsprint Industries (MNI) started up a greenfield paper mill in Mentakab in the year 1996. MNI is one of the largest paper factories in Southeast Asia.

Mentakab Veneer & Plywood Sdn Bhd (MVP) was incorporated in 1986 as a joint venture company between Malaysian and Taiwanese shareholders. It main business is to engage in the manufacture and marketing of plywood. Mentakab Veneer & Plywood’ factory which is a located at the 5th Mile, Jalan Karak, P.O. Box 12, 28400 Mentakab, Pahang Darul Makmur (Mentakab is strategically located 123 km from Kuala Lumpur, 181 km from KLIA and 192 km from Port Klang (major port in Malaysia), commenced plywood production in 1986 and marketed its product for local consumption and a small volume for export. Today, MVP is an active member of The Malaysian Panel-Products Manufacturer's Association (MPMA) and it manufactures Urea Formaldehyde, Phenol Formaldehyde and Melamine Urea Formaldehyde Plywood.

=== Night market ===
Mentakab has a daily night market (pasar malam) located along the Jalan Mok Hee Kiang stretch. At around 5pm, this road will be closed to motorists to make way for hawkers. Jalan Mok Hee Kiang is one of the street where most of the citizens often visit due to its wide variety of daily goods sold. Jalan Mok Hee Kiang is famous among Mentakab citizens.

=== Mentakab Mall ===
Located between Taman Bukit Bendera and Taman Rimba in the western suburbs of Mentakab, Star Mall is the newest and largest shopping mall in the city. The mall was constructed by a private developer from Kuantan namely Sistem Duta Sdn Bhd, a subsidiary body of Kinsteel Bhd, owned by Tan Sri Dato' Pheng Yin Huah, a steel industry tycoon in Malaysia. Mentakab Star Mall consists three stories, and currently houses Mentakab's only cinema.

=== Public healthcare ===
- Klinik Kesihatan Mentakab
- Klinik 1Malaysia

=== Telecommunications ===
All four major telcos in Malaysia - Maxis, Celcom, Digi and U Mobile have provided coverage in Mentakab.

=== Other facilities ===
Being the largest city in central Pahang, several major banking institutions of Malaysia have set up branches in Mentakab. There are also several inns around the city.

== Housing estates and suburbs ==
- Batu Kapur
- Kampung Netas
- Ladang Edensor
- Ladang Mentakab
- New Village Kampung Suria
- Taman Bukit Bendera
- Taman Bukit Cermin
- Taman Bukit Mentakab
- Taman Desa Saujana
- Taman KSM Indah
- Taman KSM
- Taman KSM Heights
- Taman Lee Chan
- Taman Mahkota
- Taman Mentakab
- Taman Pinggiran Temerloh Damai
- Taman Rimba
- Taman Saga
- Taman Saga Indah
- Taman Sri Layang
- Taman Suppiah
- Taman Tan Chew Tong
- Taman Tualang indah
- Taman Tunas
- Tanjong Kerayong
- Taman Pinggiran Netas Jaya

== Education ==
=== Primary ===
National schools (Sekolah Kebangsaan)

- SK Abu Bakar
- SK Bandar Mentakab
- SK Batu Kapur
- SK Chatin

Chinese and Tamil vernacular schools

- SJK (Tamil)/SJK(T) Bandar Mentakab
- SJK(C) Mentakab 1 (文德甲中华华文小学1校)
- SJK(C) Mentakab 2 (文德甲中华华文小学2校)
- SJK(C) Yeow Cheng Luan (姚贞嫒华文小学) and SJK(T) Yeow Cheng Luan
- SJK(T) Ladang Mentakab

=== Secondary ===
- SMJK Hwa Lian (文德甲华联国民型华文中学)
- SMK Mentakab
- SMK Seri Semantan
- SMK Bukit Cermin

=== Higher education ===
- Kolej Komuniti Temerloh (Temerloh Community College)
- Open University Malaysia - Temerloh campus

== Demographics ==
Mentakab is also very famous for its inter-racial unity; the population contains people of diverse ethnic backgrounds and religious beliefs. Religious houses such as mosques, churches, hindu temples, chinese temples, Sikh gurdwara, buddhist monastery are abundant here.

== Driving distance from Mentakab to cities in Malaysia (km) ==
- 35 km Teriang
- 49 km Kemayan
- 63 km Jerantut
- 71 km Bahau
- 121 km Kuala Lipis
- 124 km Kuantan
- 136 km Kuala Lumpur
- 143 km Gemas
- 157 km Segamat
- 158 km Shah Alam
- 162 km Putrajaya
- 195 km Seremban
- 249 km Cameron Highlands
- 277 km Malacca
- 322 km Ipoh
- 338 km Kuala Terengganu
- 355 km Johor Bahru
- 470 km Kota Bharu
- 472 km George Town
- 554 km Alor Setar
- 603 km Kangar
- 2,775 km Kuching
- 3,768 km Kota Kinabalu
