= Kerdau =

Kerdau (Pahang Malay: Keghda) is a mukim (township) in Temerloh District, Pahang, Malaysia.
