= Temerloh =

- Municipality and district capital
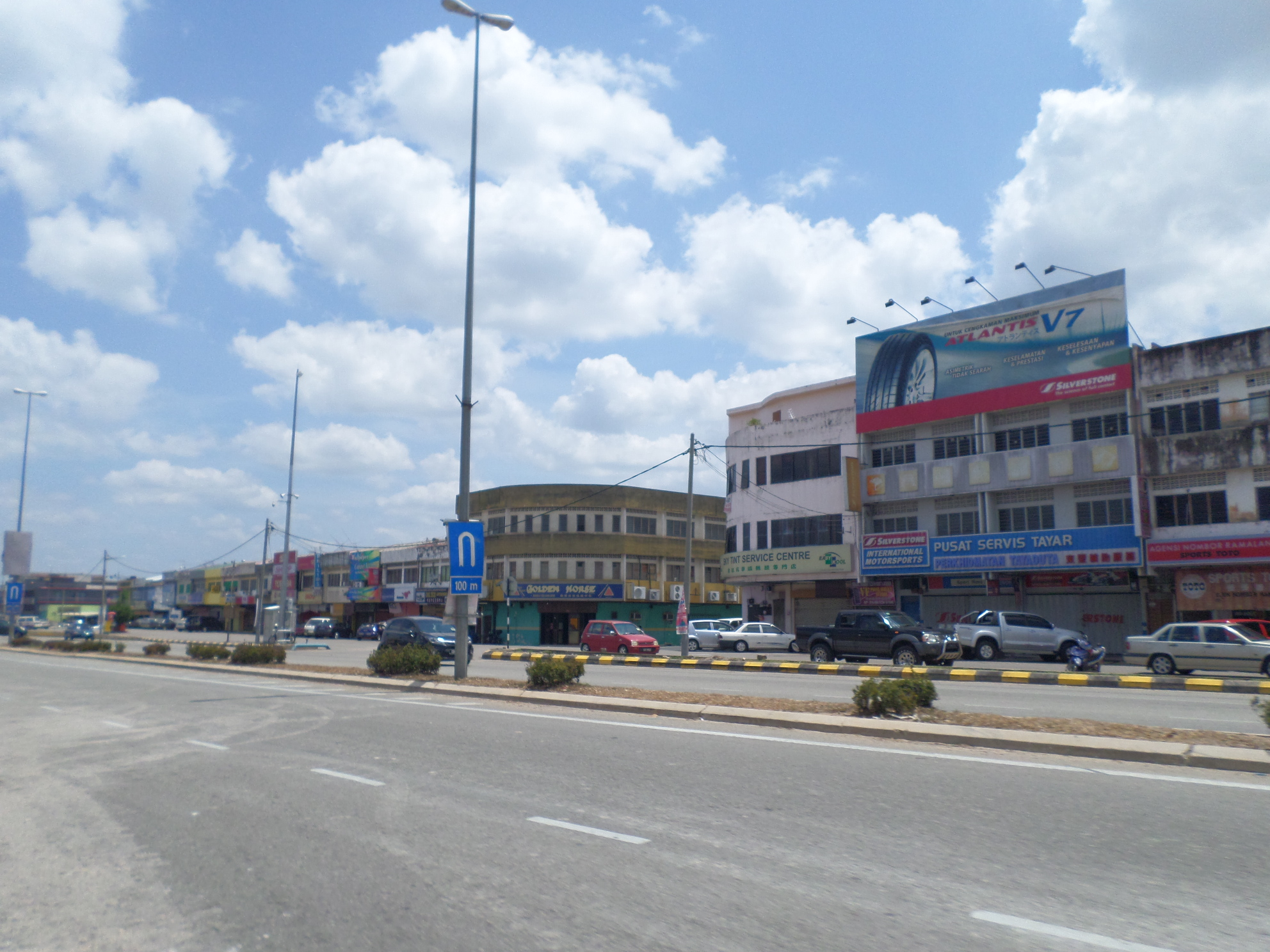
- Temerloh Town

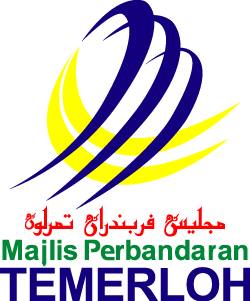
- Seal
- Interactive map of Temerloh
- Country: Malaysia
- State: Pahang
- District: Temerloh District
- Establishment: 1889
- Granted municipality status: 15 January 1997

Government
  - Type: Local government
  - Body: Temerloh Municipal Council
  - President: Jezlily Bt Jamaluddin

Area
  - Total: 120,000 km^{2} (46,000 sq mi)

Population (2020)
  - Total: 141,781
  - Density: 1.2/km^{2} (3.1/sq mi)
- Postcode: 28xxx
- Telephone area code: +60-09
- Website: mpt.gov.my

Temerloh Municipal Council Majlis Perbandaran Temerloh مجليس ڤربندرن تمارلوه
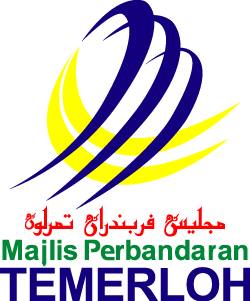

Type
- Type: Local authority

History
- Founded: 15 January 1997
- Preceded by: Temerloh District Council

Leadership
- President: Jezlily Jamaluddin

Meeting place
- Kompleks Pejabat Plaza Temerloh, Jalan Ahmad Shah, 28000 Temerloh, Pahang Darul Makmur

Website
- www.mpt.gov.my

Temerloh is a municipality in central Pahang, Malaysia. Located about 130 kilometres (81 mi) from Kuala Lumpur along the Kuantan–Kuala Lumpur trunk road, Temerloh is the second largest urban area in Pahang after Kuantan, the state capital city. It is situated at the confluence of the Pahang and Semantan Rivers. Today, Temerloh usually refers to the territory under the administration of Temerloh Municipal Council which includes Mentakab, Lanchang, Kuala Krau and Kerdau.

An old town with some colonial buildings and shophouses, the town has prospered in recent years as a transport hub and new industrial centre. There have been many new commercial and industrial hubs built in Temerloh in recent years. Cutting travel time in half, the East Coast Expressway links the town to Kuala Lumpur and Kuantan and adds to the growth of Temerloh.

== Etymology ==
The town was once called Kuala Semantan as it is situated at the Semantan River's confluence. The later name Temerloh was derived from the Pahangite term mereloh meaning "to sleep" or "to snore": it is said that Temerloh came about when a group of Minangkabau settlers, who came there to settle, noticed an Orang Asli (aborigine) who slept (mereloh) all day without a care in the world. Perhaps as a mark of amazement on such lazy conduct and perhaps for lack of other names, or probably just in jest, he then called the settlement Temerloh. Another more plausible theory claims the town's name is derived from a local resting place of the same Orang Asli tribe there called tempat mereloh, this would be contracted to temerloh easier on the Minangkabau settlers' tongues.

== Government ==
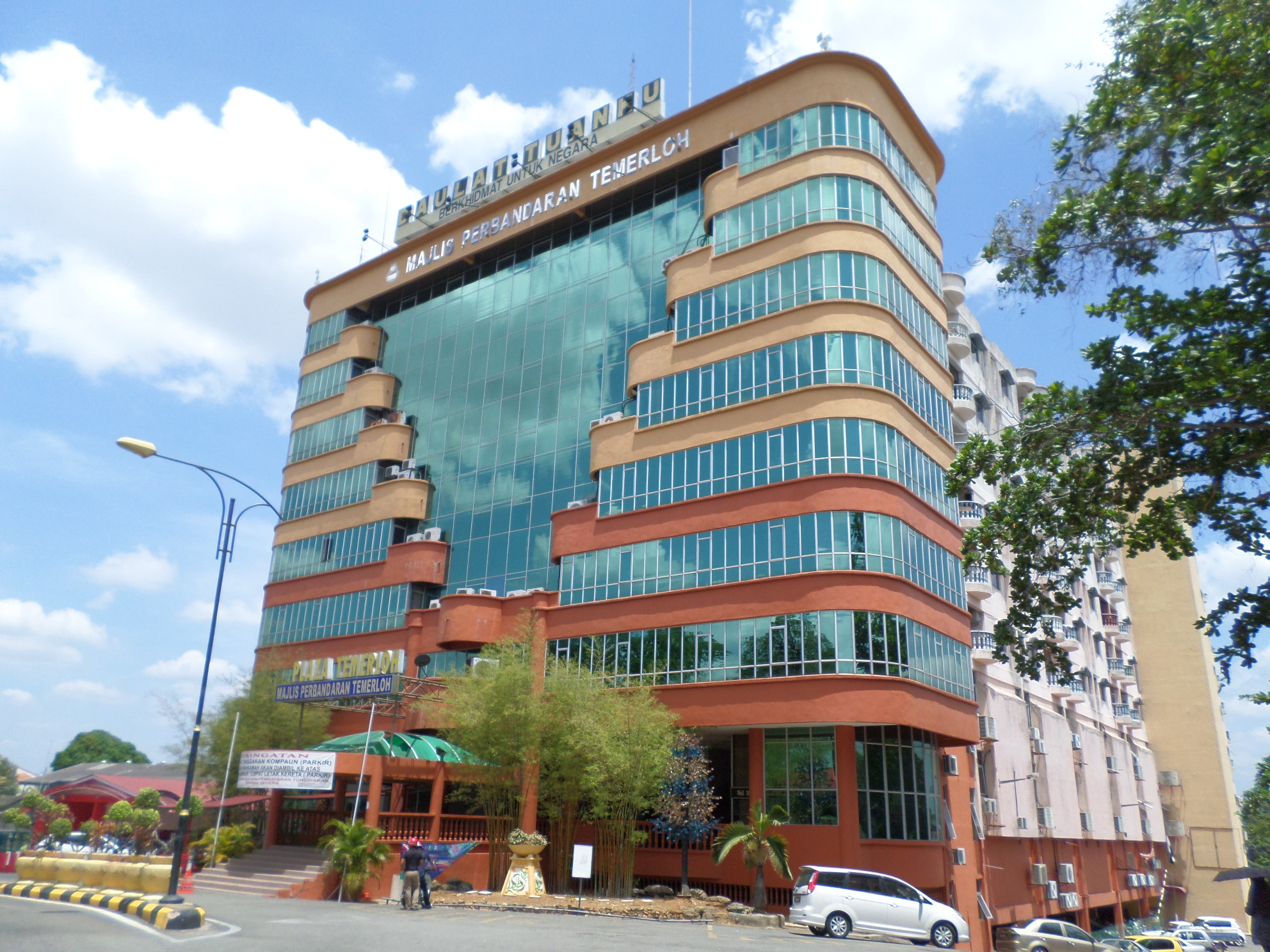
The building of Temerloh Municipal Council

Temerloh Municipal Council (Malay: Majlis Perbandaran Temerloh) is the local authority of the whole of Temerloh District including Temerloh town. From 1 July 1981 until 14 January 1997, Temerloh town was governed by the Temerloh District Council (Malay: Majlis Daerah Temerloh), which was formed through the merger of Temerloh and Mentakab Town Council and the Local Councils of Kuala Krau, Kerdau and Lanchang. Temerloh District Council was upgraded to the present-day Municipal Council on 15 January 1997.

== Climate ==
Temerloh has a tropical rainforest climate (Af) with no distinct seasons. Temperatures remain hot year round with warm nights. Precipitation peaks during the months of October to December.

Climate data for Temerloh
Month	Jan	Feb	Mar	Apr	May	Jun	Jul	Aug	Sep	Oct	Nov	Dec	Year
Record high °C (°F)	32.8 (91.0)	35.0 (95.0)	35.6 (96.1)	36.1 (97.0)	35.6 (96.1)	35.0 (95.0)	35.0 (95.0)	35.0 (95.0)	35.0 (95.0)	35.0 (95.0)	33.9 (93.0)	33.3 (91.9)	36.1 (97.0)
Mean daily maximum °C (°F)	29.4 (84.9)	31.1 (88.0)	32.2 (90.0)	32.8 (91.0)	32.8 (91.0)	32.2 (90.0)	32.2 (90.0)	32.2 (90.0)	32.2 (90.0)	31.7 (89.1)	30.6 (87.1)	30.0 (86.0)	31.6 (88.9)
Daily mean °C (°F)	25.6 (78.1)	26.4 (79.5)	27.2 (81.0)	27.8 (82.0)	27.8 (82.0)	27.5 (81.5)	27.2 (81.0)	27.2 (81.0)	27.2 (81.0)	27.2 (81.0)	26.7 (80.1)	26.1 (79.0)	27.0 (80.6)
Mean daily minimum °C (°F)	21.7 (71.1)	21.7 (71.1)	22.2 (72.0)	22.8 (73.0)	22.8 (73.0)	22.8 (73.0)	22.2 (72.0)	22.2 (72.0)	22.2 (72.0)	22.8 (73.0)	22.8 (73.0)	22.2 (72.0)	22.4 (72.3)
Record low °C (°F)	17.8 (64.0)	18.9 (66.0)	19.4 (66.9)	20.6 (69.1)	20.0 (68.0)	20.0 (68.0)	20.0 (68.0)	19.4 (66.9)	18.9 (66.0)	20.6 (69.1)	20.6 (69.1)	18.3 (64.9)	17.8 (64.0)
Average precipitation mm (inches)	198.1 (7.80)	99.1 (3.90)	152.4 (6.00)	193.0 (7.60)	167.6 (6.60)	109.2 (4.30)	86.4 (3.40)	142.2 (5.60)	165.1 (6.50)	236.2 (9.30)	246.4 (9.70)	256.6 (10.10)	2,052 (80.79)
Source: Sistema de Clasificación Bioclimática Mundial

== History ==
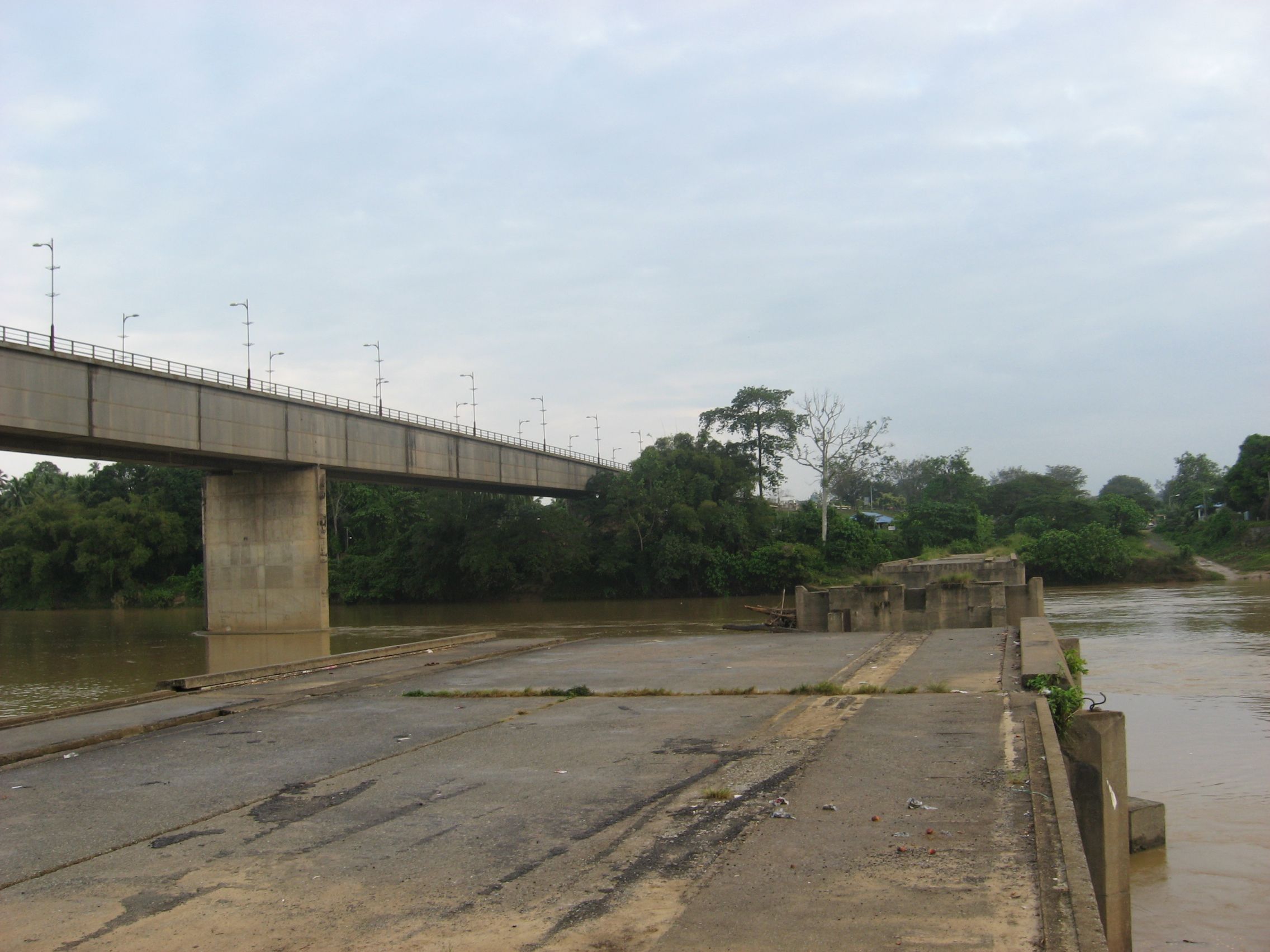
Damaged Temerloh bridge during 1971/72 flood.

According to Haji Zakaria Hitam, the modern-day Temerloh developed from a small settlement called Kuala Semantan. Kuala Semantan was actually a small old village at the bank of Semantan River. According to the folk story, the name Semantan came from the words Seman Tahan. Osman, or Seman Tahan as the villagers called him, is a Bruneian who settled at the small river connected to Pahang River. He mastered the martial art of silat, thus many people came all the way and settled here to learn silat from him. As Seman Tahan became popular among the villagers, they named the river Seman Tahan River. Thus, the town near the river was called Kuala Seman Tahan (kuala in Malay means 'river confluence'). The name Seman Tahan gradually became Semantan.

The Temerloh district, on the other hand was established on July 1, 1889, when J. P. Rodger, the first Pahang Resident divided Pahang state into six smaller administration areas (districts): Pekan, Rompin, Kuala Pahang, Kuantan, Temerloh and Hulu Pahang. The capital of Temerloh district then (1 July 1889) was Kuala Semantan. As Kuala Semantan begin to develop rapidly, the name Kuala Semantan was thought unsuitable as the kuala only refers to the river confluence. Hence, Kuala Semantan changed its name to Temerloh. Before the British colonization, Temerloh was governed by several headvillagers (village level) and Orang Besar (dignitaries) under the Pahang's administration of the Orang Besar System. The Temerloh people (then) were mainly Malay and Orang Asli; however, there were also small groups of Chinese and Arabs there.

== Demographics ==
The following is based on the Department of Statistics Malaysia 2010 census.

Ethnic groups in Temerloh Municipal Council, 2010 census
Ethnicity	Population	Percentage
Bumiputera	120,154	75.7%
Chinese	25,078	15.8%
Indian	12,380	7.8%
Others	1,111	0.7%

== Infrastructure ==
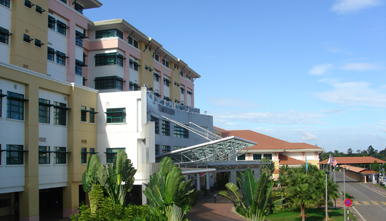
Sultan Haji Ahmad Shah Hospital.

Temerloh is well-connected to Kuala Lumpur and Kuantan via the East Coast Expressway and the Karak Expressway. These expressways also link Temerloh to other major towns in Pahang such as Maran, Karak and Bentong. The new state-of-the-art Hospital Sultan Haji Ahmad Shah serves as the main hospital in Central Pahang apart from Hospital Mentakab and Hospital Jengka. To cater to various sports activities such as athletics and field games, Temerloh Stadium was built and is usually fully utilized during the weekends. There are many shopping places in Temerloh: The Store, Lurah Semantan, Seri Semantan, Bazaar Temerloh, and others. The East Coast Expressway project includes the Sultan Ahmad Shah II Bridge in Temerloh. It crosses the Pahang River, the longest river in west Malaysia.

Hotel Green Park, one of the best hotels in Temerloh, is the tallest building in the town.

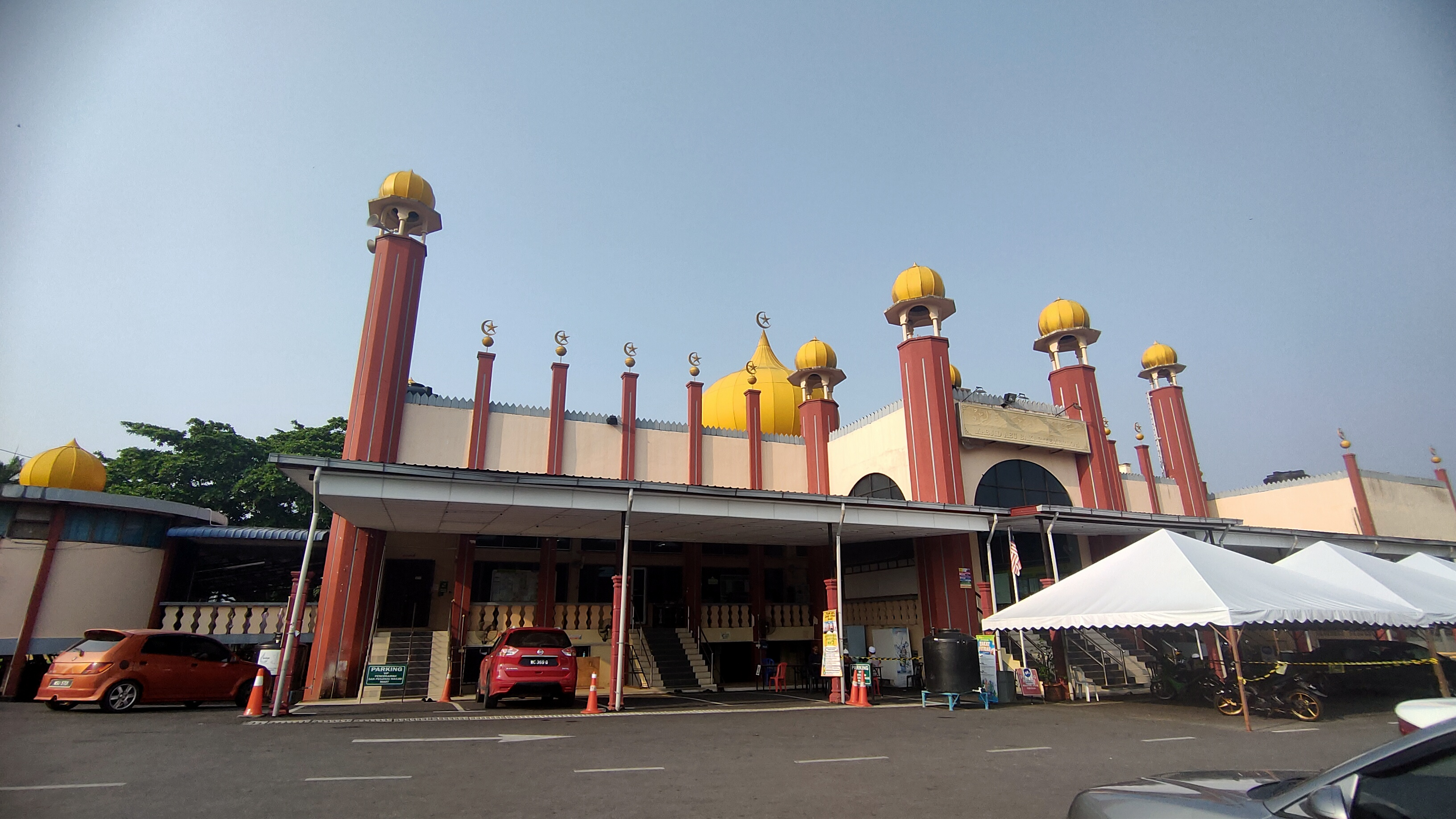
Abu Bakar Mosque in Temerloh, Pahang.

Temerloh Mini Stadium is home to match Malaysia Premier League and FAM Cup League Malaysia for the team Pahang FA and Shahzan Muda FC

== Tourism ==
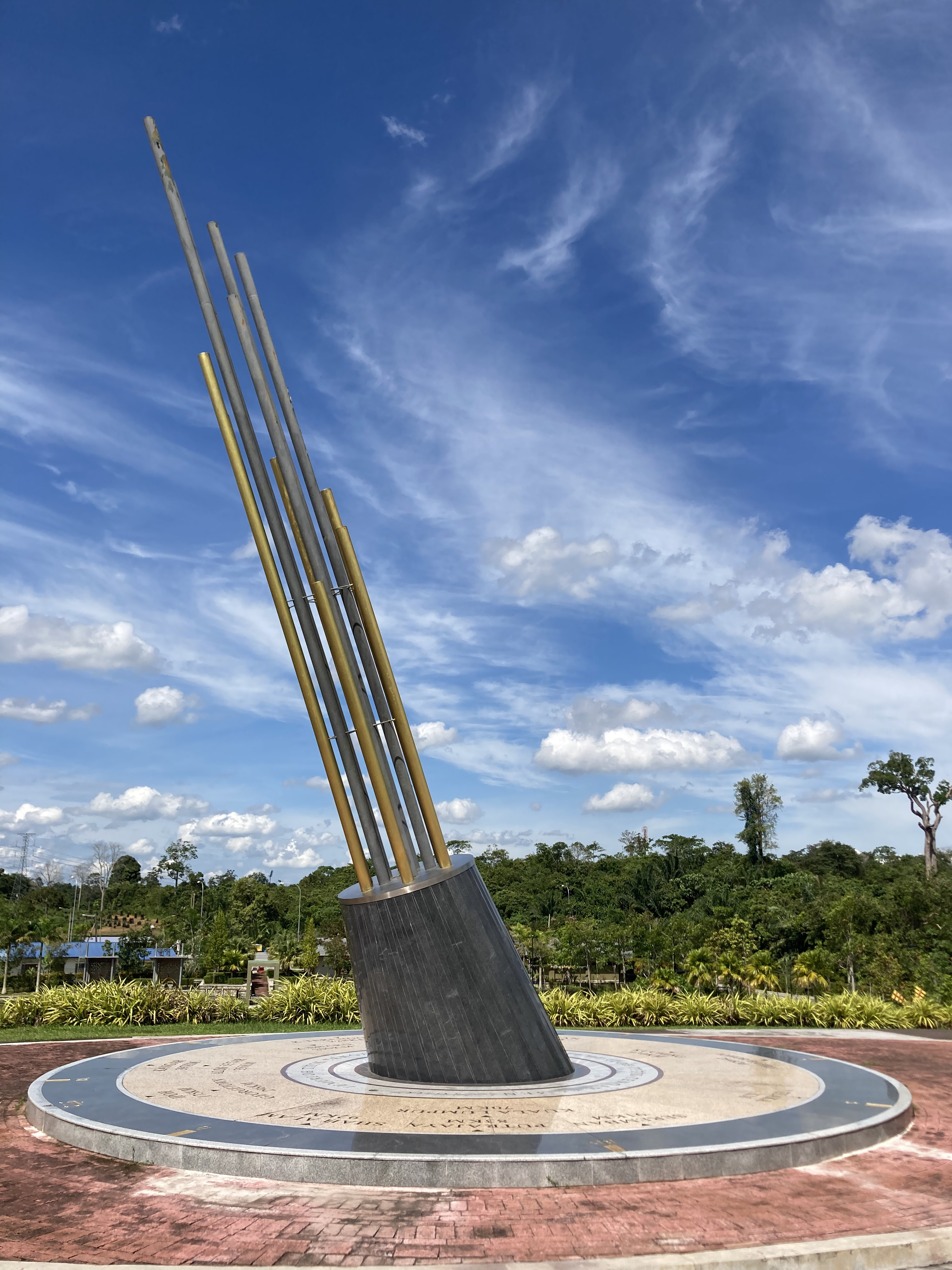
Gnomon monument marking the geographic centre of Peninsular Malaysia.

Temerloh is located around 22.7 km (14.10 mi) east from the geographic centre of Peninsular Malaysia, which is situated at Kampung Paya Siput, Lanchang (3°29′33″N 102°13′10″E).

Temerloh sits at the confluence of the Pahang and Semantan Rivers, attributing the town with an abundance of with freshwater fish species such as patin (Pangasius), jelawat (Leptobarbus hoevenii), baung (Hemibagrus nemurus), tenggalan (Puntioplites bulu), lampam (Barbonymus sp), belida (Chitala lopis), tilapia and kerai (Hypsibarbus wetmorei) . As the home of the patin fish, the local cuisine exhibits dishes that bring out the taste of the fish. Located along the town's riverside, the Sunday bazaar, Pekan Sehari, is a place where a wide range of commodities are sold at a reasonable price. The Pekan Sehari is said to be the longest and biggest in the whole of Pahang. The sellers normally come by riverboat early in the morning, and take their place before the customers arrive about 7:00 in the morning. Sunday mornings are busy when boats come and go ferrying passengers and goods to the Pekan Sehari.

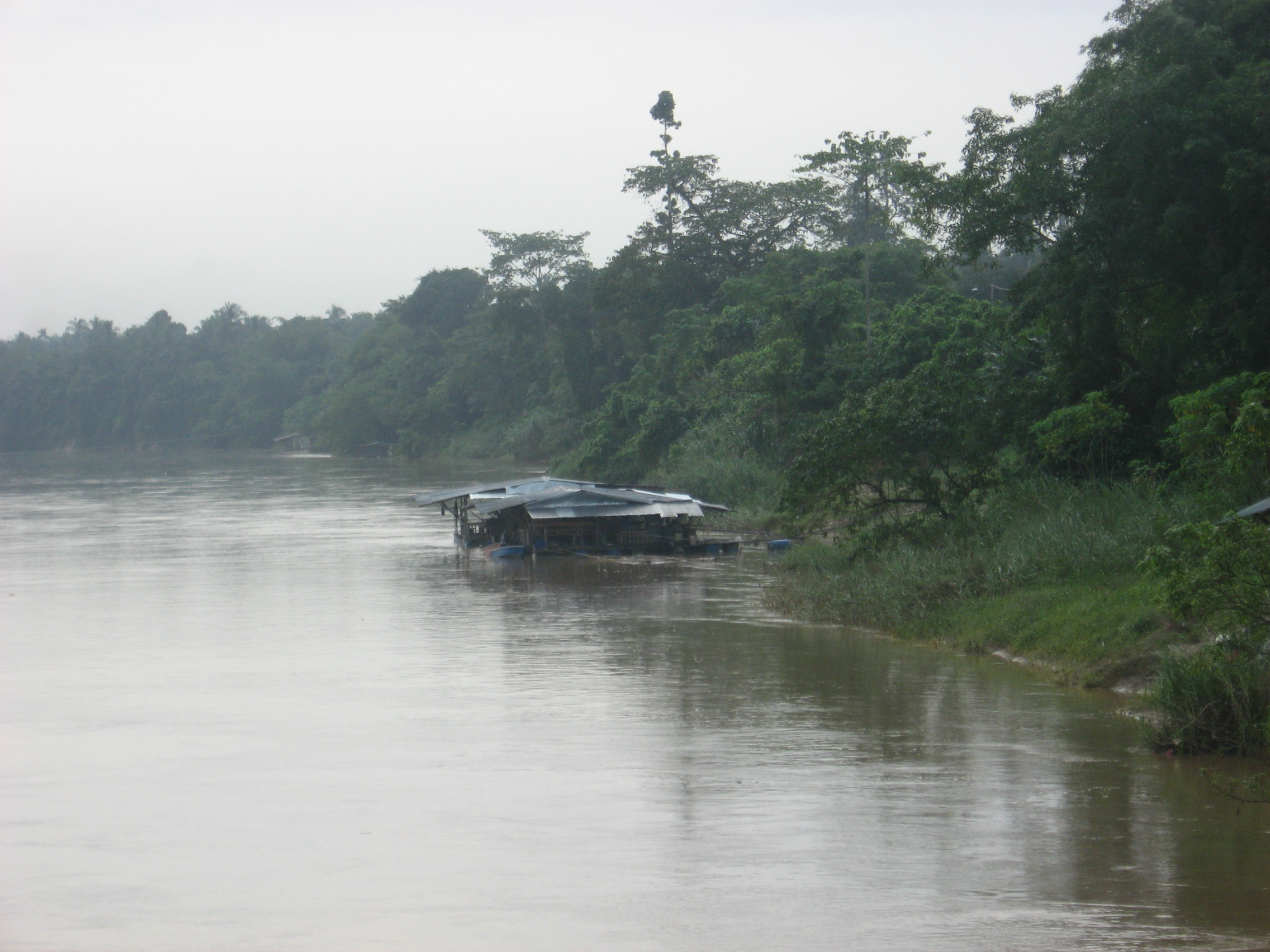
Raft house on the Pahang River near Temerloh town.

Apart from its variety of fish, the town of Temerloh also offers a variety of jungle and wildlife experiences. The Kuala Krau Wildlife Reserve, a virgin forest reserve with untouched flora and fauna, is also where you can find the Kuala Gandah Elephant Conservation Centre and the Seladang Breeding Center. Gunung Senyum Recreational Forest, a paradise for nature and cave lovers is just about 20 kilometres (12 mi) away. Located at Bukit Rengit, Lanchang, the Deerland Park features not only deer, allowing visitors to feed, touch, and learn about them, but also other animals such as ostrich, peacock, tuna deer, nilgai (India) and wood duck (Canada). Home to the albino monkey, porcupine, black leopard, civet, the Malayan gharial crocodile and alligators, the town's mini zoo covers over 1.5 hectares (3.7 acres) of land, and is located at Jalan Bahagia, near Kampung Sungai Rabit. There's also a recreational park located right in the middle of Temerloh town, behind the courthouse, called Taman Bandar (Town Park). Among the facilities provided here are skateboard track, playground, jogging trails and a mini stadium.

== Transportation ==
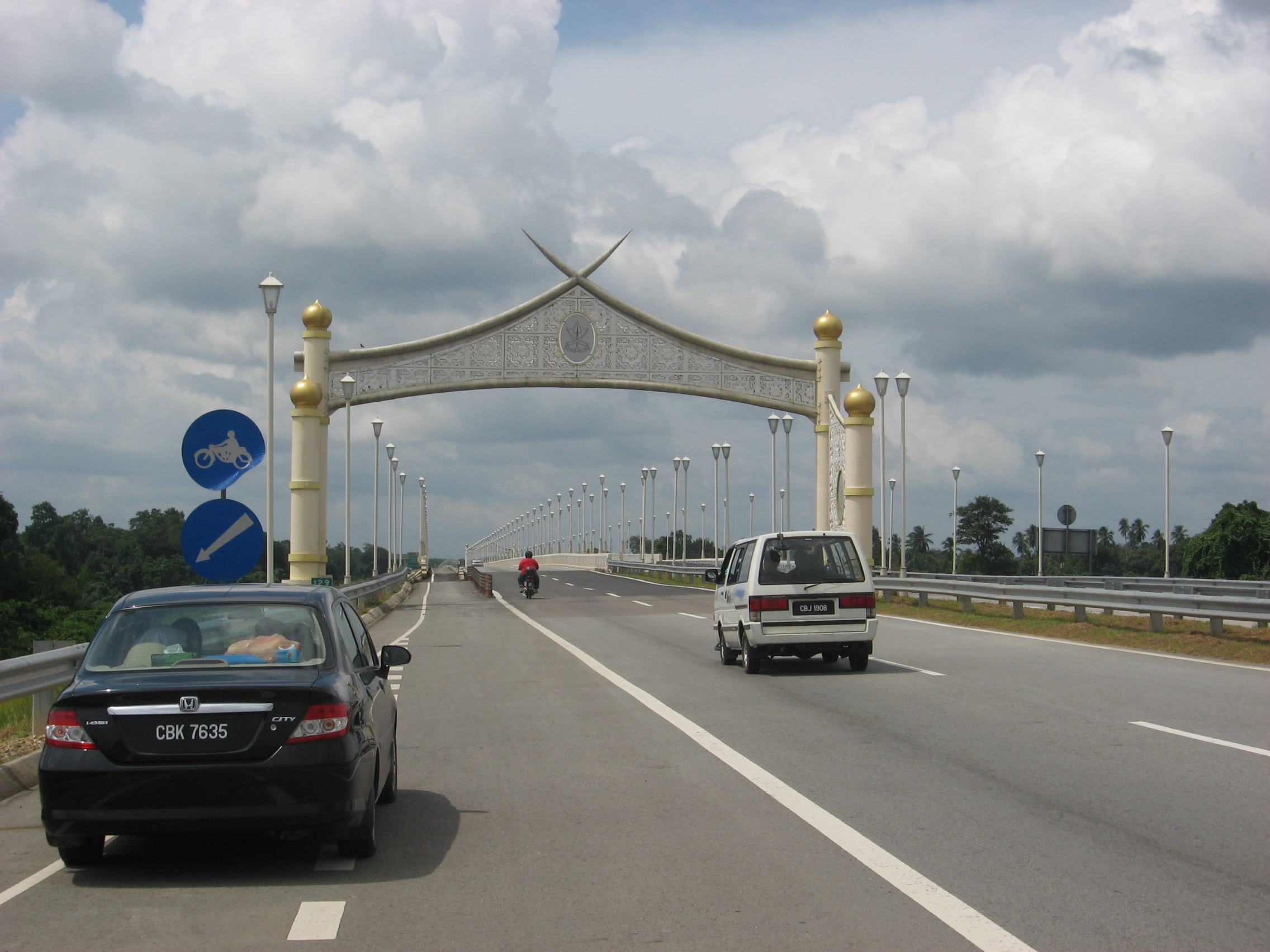
The Sultan Ahmad Shah II Bridge carries the East Coast Expressway.

By road
The old Kuala Lumpur–Kuantan federal highway is the main route serving downtown Temerloh, though motorists now prefer the LPT which links Temerloh all the way to Kuantan and then to Kuala Terengganu. Mentakab is linked to Temerloh by Malaysia Federal Route 87. Temerloh is the northern end of Federal Route 10 which begins in Gemas, Negeri Sembilan and runs almost parallel to KTMB's east coastal railtracks. Federal Route 98 joins Temerloh to Jerantut, and is the main gateway to northern Pahang.

E-Hailing service at Temerloh – MyCar Temerloh. MyCar allows passengers to find drivers in minutes.

By rail
The nearest train station to Temerloh is Mentakab train station apart from other minor stations which are situated at Sungai Belengu, Kerdau and Kuala Krau. The train service is provided by the KTMB. The East Coast Rail Link, a brand new higher-speed rail service will be serving the town in the future.

By water
The water transportation among the locals still exists especially for those who live on the banks of the Pahang River. Water transportation is a necessity, especially for the farmers to transport their crops as there is no bridge to connect both sides of the river.
