= Temerloh District =

- District of Pahang
- Daerah Temerloh
- Location of Temerloh District in Pahang
- Interactive map of Temerloh District
- Location of Temerloh District in Malaysia
- Coordinates: 3°22′N 102°25′E
- Country: Malaysia
- State: Pahang
- Seat: Temerloh
- Local area government(s): Temerloh Municipal Council

Government
  - District officer: Fadzli Kenali

Area
  - Total: 2,251 km^{2} (869 sq mi)

Population (2010)
  - Total: 157,562
  - Density: 70.00/km^{2} (181.3/sq mi)
- Time zone: UTC+8 (MST)
  - Summer (DST): UTC+8 (Not observed)
- Postcode: 28xxx
- Calling code: +6-09
- Vehicle registration plates: C

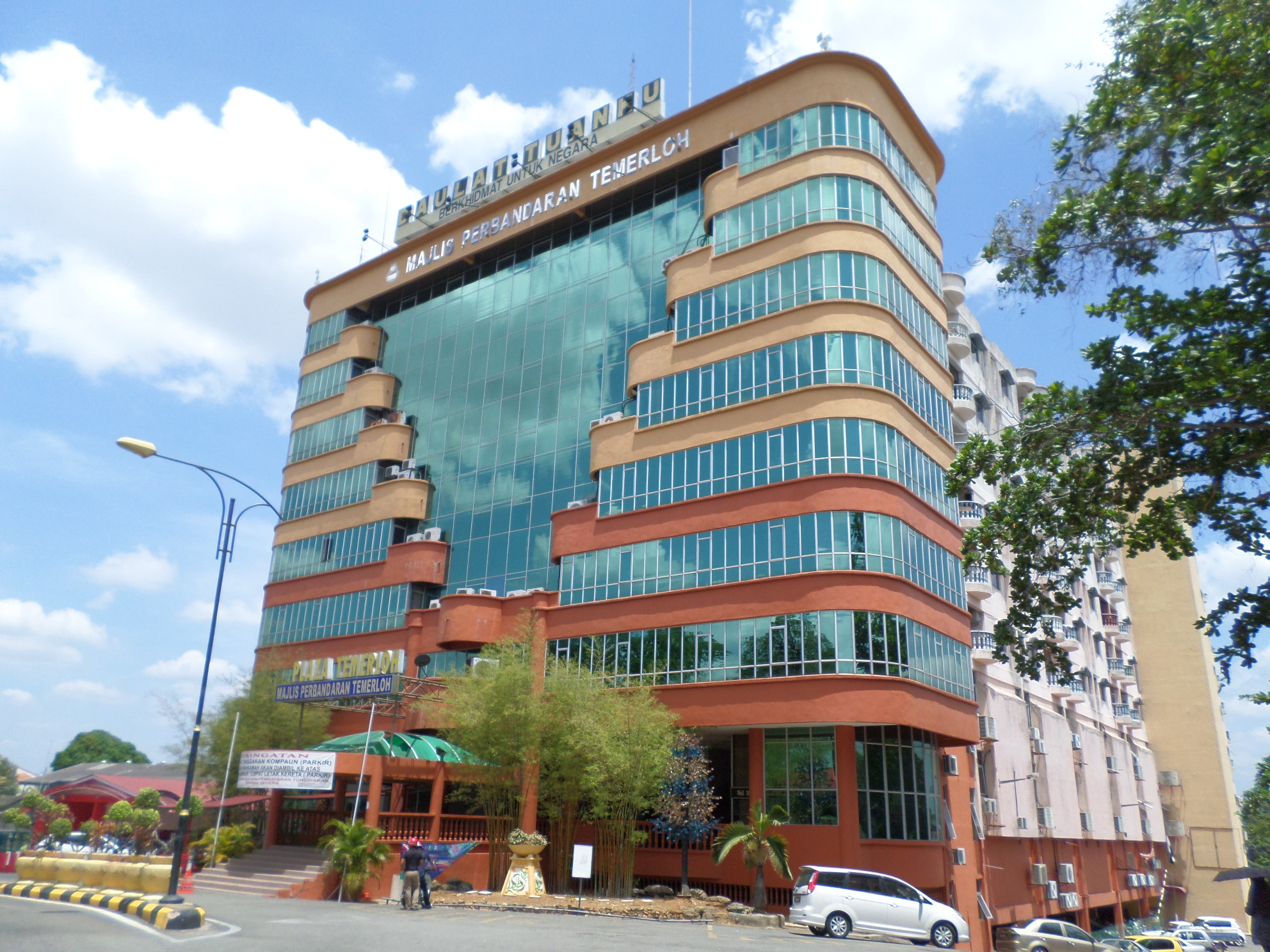
Temerloh Municipal Council.

Temerloh District is a district in Pahang, Malaysia. The district consists of two areas, the 1,442-square-kilometre (557 sq mi) Municipal Council Area (64.08%) and the 808-square-kilometre (312 sq mi) outer Municipal Council Area (35.92%). Temerloh district is bordered by Maran District on the east, Bentong District on the west, Jerantut District on the north, and Bera District on the south.

== Demographics ==
Historical population
Year	Pop.	±%
1991	186,907	—
2000	136,214	−27.1%
2010	158,724	+16.5%
2020	169,023	+6.5%
Figures before 1992 includes Bera District. Source:

The following is based on Department of Statistics Malaysia 2016 census.

Ethnic groups in Temerloh, 2016 census
Ethnicity	Population	Percentage
Bumiputera	124,340	75.7%
Chinese	33,655	15.8%
Indian	18,005	7.8%
Others	2,210	0.7%
Total	190,500	100%

== Federal Parliament and State Assembly Seats ==
List of Temerloh district representatives in the Federal Parliament (Dewan Rakyat)

Parliament	Seat Name	Member of Parliament	Party
P87	Kuala Krau	Kamal Asaari	Perikatan Nasional (PAS)
P88	Temerloh	Salamiah Mohd Nor	Perikatan Nasional (PAS)

List of Temerloh district representatives in the State Legislative Assembly (Dewan Undangan Negeri)

Parliament	State	Seat Name	State Assemblyman	Party
P87	N27	Jenderak	Rodzuan Zaaba	Perikatan Nasional (PAS)
P87	N28	Kerdau	Syed Ibrahim Syed Ahmad	Barisan Nasional (UMNO)
P88	N30	Mentakab	Woo Chee Wan	Pakatan Harapan (DAP)
P88	N31	Lanchang	Hassan Omar	Perikatan Nasional (PAS)
P88	N32	Kuala Semantan	Hassanuddin Salim	Perikatan Nasional (PAS)

Note: Jengka (N29) state constituency is located in the district of Maran.

== Subdistricts ==
Map of Temerloh district.

Temerloh has 10 mukim or subdistricts.

Mukim	Area	Penghulu Name
Bangau	3,368.40 hectares	Sheikh Romali bin Sheikh Embong
Jenderak	83,433.10 hectares	(i) Haji Zainal Azman bin Hj. Bidin (ii) Syaharul Alimi bin Mohamed Yusop
Kerdau	13,214.50 hectares	Ahmad Boestamam bin Hamid
Lebak	4,404.80 hectares	Ungku Hasbar Shah B. Ungku Abdul Arif
Lipat Kajang	3,886.60 hectares	Ahmad Boestamam bin Hamid
Mentakab	10,364.30 hectares	(i) Alias bin Nong (ii) Khaidhir Azly bin Daharudin
Perak	20,987.80 hectares	(i) Nadzi bin Jamal (ii) Abdul Khalid bin Husin
Sanggang	8,809.70 hectares	(i) Tn. Hj. Zainundin bin Ahmad (ii) Nor Aripin bin Ibrahim
Songsang	2,331.90 hectares	Jamaludin bin Haji Ayub
Semantan	74,364.30 hectares	Wan Ahmad Zabri bin Wan Mat Alam

=== District Officer ===
The current district officer of Temerloh is Dato' Mohd Fadzli bin Mohd Kenali.

No.	District Officer	Year
1	E.A. Wise	1889 - 1891
2	J.F. Owen	1891 - 1891
3	C.E.M. Desborough	1891 - 1892
4	E.A. Wise	1892 - 1892
5	J.F. Owen	1892 - 1892
6	T.C. Fleming	1892 - 1894
7	E.F. Townley	1894 - 1898
8	W.L. Conlay	1898 - 1898
9	F.W. Douglas	1898 - 1898
10	F.A.S. MC. Clelland	1898 - 1902
11	M. Frost	1902 - 1903
12	F.E. ST. Dalmas	1903 - 1903
13	H.C. Eckhardt	1903 - 1906
14	C.H.G. Clarke	1906 - 1907
15	H.S. Sircom	1907 - 1907
16	A.J. Sturrock	1907 - 1908
17	E.C. Pratt	1908 - 1910
18	T.W. Clayton	1910 - 1911
19	G. Hemmant	1911 - 1914
20	J.W.W. Hughes	1914 - 1919
21	F. Robinson	1919 - 1919
22	G.E. London	1919 - 1919
23	J.V. Cowgill	1919 - 1920
24	W.D. Barron	1920 - 1922
25	C.W. Sennett	1922 - 1923
26	W.A. Gordon-Hall	1923 - 1923
27	J.D.M. Smith	1923 - 1924
28	Hamzah Bin Abdullah	1924 - 1926
29	Dato' Haji Hussein Bin Mohd Taib	1926 - 1926
30	Hamzah Bin Abdullah	1926 - 1927
31	J.D.M. Smith	1927 - 1929
32	W.A. Ward	1929 - 1930
33	J.J. Sheehan	1930 - 1933
34	J.A. Harvey	1933 - 1933
35	W.C.S. Corry	1933 - 1936
36	H.G. Turner	1936 - 1937
37	G.G. Gregg	1937 - 1938
38	J.E. Pepper	1938 - 1941
39	E.G.C. Barret	1941 - 1942
40	Abd. Aziz Bin Hj. Mat Jabar	1942 - 1945
41	Dato' Abu Samah Bin Hj. Ali	1945 - 1946
42	Dato' Haji Hussein Bin Mohd Taib	1946 - 1949
43	I.B. Mendel	1949 - 1950
44	D.C.I. Warnham	1950 - 1951
45	I.B. Mendel	1951 - 1952
46	I.M. Edye	1952 - 1953
47	J.C. Bottoms	1953 - 1954
48	J.A. Aitken	1954 - 1956
49	G.T.M. De M Morgan	1956 - 1957
50	C.G. Ferguson	1957 - 1960
51	Zainal Abidin Bin Osman	1960 - 1961
52	Mansoor Bin Zeinal	1961 - 1963
53	Yang Amri Bin Kamaruddin	1963 - 1965
54	Mohd Othman Bin Mohd Din	1965 - 1966
55	Jamaluddin Bin Haji Ujang	1966 - 1969
56	Raja Brima Sulong Bin Raja Rome. P.J.K.	1969 - 1971
57	Hj. Nasir Bin Hj. Mat Piah	1971 - 1972
58	Abdul Manaf Bin Abdul Rahim	1972 - 1975
59	Hj. Mohd Kassim Bin Hj. Abd. Rahman. SMP.	1975 - 1980
60	Abdullah Bin Hj. Kia. AMP., PJK.	1980 - 1982
61	Anuar Bin Ab. Latif. AMN.	1982 - 1984
62	Abdul Malik Bin Ahmad. KMN., AMP.	1984 - 1986
63	Abdul Khalil Bin Hj. Wahab	1986 - 1987
64	Hj. Abdul Razak Yahya	1987 - 1988
65	Mohd Esa Mohd Sharif	1988 - 1990
66	Nasaruddin Hashim	1990 - 1993
67	Hj. Jaafar Hj. Mat	1993 - 1994
68	Hj. Hashim Abdul Wahab	1994 - 1996
69	Hj. Abdul Rahim Md. Jelas	1996 - 2000
70	Dato' Hj. Abdul Hashim Mohd	2000 - 2004
71	Dato' Hj. Abu Hassan Hj. Saidin	2004 - 2007
72	Dato' Abu Jamal Nordin	2007 - 2008
73	Dato' Dr. Salehuddin Ishak	2008 - 2011
74	Dato' Abdul Muain Abdul Hamid	2011 - 2012
75	Dato' Hj. Tarif Abdul Rahman	2012 - 2015
76	Dato' Mohd Fadzli bin Mohd Kenali	2015 - 2026

== See also ==
- Districts of Malaysia
