= List of FELDA/FELCRA federal roads in Malaysia =

List of FELDA/FELCRA federal roads in Malaysia

== Peninsular Malaysia ==
Highway shield	Name	Name of roads	Highways
FT 1000	Malaysia Federal Route 1000	Jalan Mata Air	
FT 1001	Malaysia Federal Route 1001	Jalan Rimba Mas	
FT 1002	Malaysia Federal Route 1002	Jalan Chuping	
FT 1148	Malaysia Federal Route 1148	Jalan FELDA Ijok	
FT 1149	Malaysia Federal Route 1149	Jalan Sungai Klah	
FT 1150	Malaysia Federal Route 1150	Jalan Sungai Behrang	
FT 1151	Malaysia Federal Route 1151	Jalan FELDA Trolak Utara	
FT 1152	Malaysia Federal Route 1152	Jalan FELDA Trolak Selatan	
FT 1153	Malaysia Federal Route 1153	Jalan FELDA Trolak Timur	
FT 1154	Malaysia Federal Route 1154	Jalan FELDA Besout	
FT 1155	Malaysia Federal Route 1155	Jalan FELDA Lawin Selatan	
FT 1156	Malaysia Federal Route 1156	Jalan FELDA Lawin Utara	
FT 1157	Malaysia Federal Route 1157	Ayer Panas - Lepang Nenering - Kampung Baharu	
FT 1205	Malaysia Federal Route 1205	Jalan Sungai Tengi	
FT 1206	Malaysia Federal Route 1206	Jalan FELDA Soeharto	
FT 1207	Malaysia Federal Route 1207	Jalan Kampung Gedangsa	
FT 1208	Malaysia Federal Route 1208	Jalan Sungai Buaya	
FT 1209	Malaysia Federal Route 1209	Jalan Sungai Tengi Selatan	
FT 1210	Malaysia Federal Route 1210	Jalan FELDA Bukit Cerakah 1 & 2	
FT 1265	Malaysia Federal Route 1265	Jalan Nilai-Port Dickson	
FT 1266	Malaysia Federal Route 1266	Jalan FELDA LB Johnson	
FT 1267	Malaysia Federal Route 1267	Jalan Bukit Jalor	
FT 1268	Malaysia Federal Route 1268	Jalan FELDA Serting 1 - 4	
FT 1269	Malaysia Federal Route 1269	Jalan Kilang Sawit Serting	
FT 1270	Malaysia Federal Route 1270	Jalan Utama Serting Hilir	
FT 1271	Malaysia Federal Route 1271	Jalan FELDA Lui Selatan - Tembangau	
FT 1272	Malaysia Federal Route 1272	Jalan Sungai Lui	
FT 1273	Malaysia Federal Route 1273	Jalan FELDA Lui Selatan	
FT 1274	Malaysia Federal Route 1274	Jalan FELDA Lui Timur	
FT 1275	Malaysia Federal Route 1275	Jalan FELDA Kepis	
FT 1276	Malaysia Federal Route 1276	Jalan Utama Bukit Rokan	
FT 1277	Malaysia Federal Route 1277	Jalan FELDA Bukit Rokan Utara	
FT 1278	Malaysia Federal Route 1278	Jalan FELDA Bukit Rokan Selatan	
FT 1279	Malaysia Federal Route 1279	Jalan FELDA Jelai Gemas 1 - 4	
FT 1280	Malaysia Federal Route 1280	Jalan Jelai Gemas Tambahan	
FT 1281	Malaysia Federal Route 1281	Jalan Utama Pasoh 1 dan 4	
FT 1282	Malaysia Federal Route 1282	Jalan Utama Pasoh 2 dan 3	
FT 1284	Malaysia Federal Route 1284	Jalan Loop Palong 5, 9 10 & 13	
FT 1285	Malaysia Federal Route 1285	Jalan FELDA Palong 8 (kilang getah)	
FT 1286	Malaysia Federal Route 1286	Jalan FELDA Palong 2	
FT 1287	Malaysia Federal Route 1287	Jalan FELDA Palong 3	
FT 1288	Malaysia Federal Route 1288	Jalan FELDA Palong 4, 5 & 6	
FT 1289	Malaysia Federal Route 1289	Jalan FELDA Palong 7 & 8	
FT 1290	Malaysia Federal Route 1290	Jalan FELDA Palong 9, 10 & 11	
FT 1291	Malaysia Federal Route 1291	Jalan FELDA Palong 12 & 13	
FT 1292	Malaysia Federal Route 1292	Jalan FELDA Titi	
FT 1293	Malaysia Federal Route 1293	Jalan FELDA Palong 16 - Tembangau	
FT 1335	Malaysia Federal Route 1335	Jalan Bukit Senggeh	
FT 1374	Malaysia Federal Route 1374	Jalan FELDA Cahaya Baru	
FT 1375	Malaysia Federal Route 1375	Jalan FELDA Ulu Tebrau	
FT 1376	Malaysia Federal Route 1376	Jalan FELDA Bukit Batu	
FT 1377	Malaysia Federal Route 1377	Jalan FELDA Bukit Permai	
FT 1378	Malaysia Federal Route 1378	Jalan FELDA Bukit Serampang	
FT 1379	Malaysia Federal Route 1379	Jalan FELDA Sri Ledang	
FT 1380	Malaysia Federal Route 1380	Jalan FELDA Lenga	
FT 1381	Malaysia Federal Route 1381	Jalan FELDA Ayer Hitam	
FT 1382	Malaysia Federal Route 1382	Jalan FELDA Tenang	
FT 1383	Malaysia Federal Route 1383	Jalan FELDA Kemelah	
FT 1384	Malaysia Federal Route 1384	Jalan Medoi	
FT 1385	Malaysia Federal Route 1385	Jalan FELDA Redong	
FT 1386	Malaysia Federal Route 1386	Jalan FELDA Pemanis	
FT 1387	Malaysia Federal Route 1387	Jalan Utama Kulai	
FT 1388	Malaysia Federal Route 1388	Jalan FELDA Taib Andak	
FT 1389	Malaysia Federal Route 1389	Jalan FELDA Bukit Besar	
FT 1390	Malaysia Federal Route 1390	Jalan FELDA Bukit Ramun	
FT 1391	Malaysia Federal Route 1391	Jalan FELDA Pasir Raja	
FT 1392	Malaysia Federal Route 1392	Jalan FELDA Endau	
FT 1393	Malaysia Federal Route 1393	Jalan Utama Tenggaroh	
FT 1394	Malaysia Federal Route 1394	Jalan FELDA Tenggaroh 5, 7 dan FELDA Tenggaroh Timur 2	
FT 1395	Malaysia Federal Route 1395	Jalan Kilang Sawit Tenggaroh	
FT 1396	Malaysia Federal Route 1396	Jalan FELDA Tenggaroh 1	
FT 1397	Malaysia Federal Route 1397	Jalan Utama Nitar	
FT 1398	Malaysia Federal Route 1398	Jalan Kilang Sawit Nitar	
FT 1399	Malaysia Federal Route 1399	Jalan FELDA Nitar 1	
FT 1400	Malaysia Federal Route 1400	Jalan FELDA Nitar 2	
FT 1401	Malaysia Federal Route 1401	Jalan FELDA Air Tawar 1	
FT 1402	Malaysia Federal Route 1402	Jalan FELDA Air Tawar 2	
FT 1403	Malaysia Federal Route 1403	Jalan FELDA Air Tawar 3	
FT 1404	Malaysia Federal Route 1404	Jalan FELDA Air Tawar 4	
FT 1405	Malaysia Federal Route 1405	Jalan FELDA Air Tawar 5	
FT 1406	Malaysia Federal Route 1406	Jalan FELDA Semenchu	
FT 1407	Malaysia Federal Route 1407	Jalan FELDA Aping Timur	
FT 1408	Malaysia Federal Route 1408	Jalan FELDA Aping Barat	
FT 1409	Malaysia Federal Route 1409	Bukit Wa Ha - Simpang Wa Ha - Bukit Easter	
FT 1410	Malaysia Federal Route 1410	Jalan Lok Heng Barat - Timur - Selatan	
FT 1411	Malaysia Federal Route 1411	Jalan Kilang Sawit Adela	
FT 1412	Malaysia Federal Route 1412	Adela - Sening - Tunggal - Kledang	
FT 1413	Malaysia Federal Route 1413	Sungai Mas - Papan Timur	
FT 1414	Malaysia Federal Route 1414	Penggel Timur - Sungai Sibol	
FT 1415	Malaysia Federal Route 1415	Jalan FELDA Linggiu	
FT 1416	Malaysia Federal Route 1416	Jalan FELDA Inas	
FT 1417	Malaysia Federal Route 1417	Jalan FELDA Maokil 1 - 4	
FT 1418	Malaysia Federal Route 1418	Jalan Utama Palong Timur	
FT 1419	Malaysia Federal Route 1419	Jalan FELDA Tenggaroh Selatan 1 & 2	
FT 1420	Malaysia Federal Route 1420	Jalan FELDA Tenggaroh 6	
FT 1421	Malaysia Federal Route 1421	Jalan FELDA Tenggaroh 4 (kilang koko)	
FT 1422	Malaysia Federal Route 1422	Jalan Simpang Wa Ha (kilang)	
FT 1423	Malaysia Federal Route 1423	Jalan FELDA Layang-Layang	
FT 1424	Malaysia Federal Route 1424	Jalan FELDA Maokil (kilang)	
FT 1425	Malaysia Federal Route 1425	Jalan Nitar Timur	
FT 1484	Malaysia Federal Route 1484	Jalan Bukit Tatau	
FT 1485	Malaysia Federal Route 1485	Jalan FELDA New Zealand	
FT 1486	Malaysia Federal Route 1486	Jalan Bukit Goh	
FT 1487	Malaysia Federal Route 1487	Jalan Bukit Kuantan	
FT 1488	Malaysia Federal Route 1488	Jalan Panching	
FT 1489	Malaysia Federal Route 1489	Jalan Panching Timur	
FT 1490	Malaysia Federal Route 1490	Jalan Panching Utara	
FT 1491	Malaysia Federal Route 1491	Jalan Panching Utara (kilang sawit)	
FT 1492	Malaysia Federal Route 1492	Jalan Utama Lepar Hilir	
FT 1493	Malaysia Federal Route 1493	Jalan FELDA Lepar Hilir 1 dan 3	
FT 1494	Malaysia Federal Route 1494	Jalan FELDA Lepar Hilir 2	
FT 1495	Malaysia Federal Route 1495	Jalan FELDA Lepar Hilir 4	
FT 1496	Malaysia Federal Route 1496	Jalan Lurah Bilut	
FT 1497	Malaysia Federal Route 1497	Jalan Seritk	
FT 1498	Malaysia Federal Route 1498	Jalan Mempaga	
FT 1499	Malaysia Federal Route 1499	Mempaga - Krau	
FT 1500	Malaysia Federal Route 1500	Jalan Bolok-Mempaga	
FT 1501	Malaysia Federal Route 1501	Jalan FELDA Lembah Klau	
FT 1502	Malaysia Federal Route 1502	Jalan FELDA Krau	
FT 1503	Malaysia Federal Route 1503	Jalan FELDA Sungai Koyan	
FT 1504	Malaysia Federal Route 1504	Jalan FELDA Tersang	
FT 1505	Malaysia Federal Route 1505	Jalan FELDA Tersang (kilang sawit)	
FT 1506	Malaysia Federal Route 1506	Jalan Utama Kecau	
FT 1507	Malaysia Federal Route 1507	Jalan Utama Jenderak	
FT 1508	Malaysia Federal Route 1508	Jalan Sungai Relang	
FT 1509	Malaysia Federal Route 1509	Jalan Mengkarak	
FT 1510	Malaysia Federal Route 1510	Jalan Utama Bera	
FT 1511	Malaysia Federal Route 1511	Jalan Kilang Sawit Kepayang	
FT 1512	Malaysia Federal Route 1512	Jalan Kilang Sawit Tementi	
FT 1513	Malaysia Federal Route 1513	Jalan Purun	
FT 1514	Malaysia Federal Route 1514	Jalan Mayam	
FT 1515	Malaysia Federal Route 1515	Jalan Bukit Kepayang	
FT 1516	Malaysia Federal Route 1516	Jalan Tementi	
FT 1517	Malaysia Federal Route 1517	Jalan Kumal	
FT 1518	Malaysia Federal Route 1518	Jalan Utama Bukit Mendi-FELDA Chemomoi	
FT 1519	Malaysia Federal Route 1519	Jalan FELDA Bukit Puchong	
FT 1520	Malaysia Federal Route 1520	Jalan FELDA Sungai Kemahal	
FT 1521	Malaysia Federal Route 1521	Jalan Lingkaran Kota Gelanggi	
FT 1522	Malaysia Federal Route 1522	Jalan Utama Kota Gelanggi 2, 4 dan 5	
FT 1523	Malaysia Federal Route 1523	Jalan Kota Gelanggi 1 dan 3	
FT 1524	Malaysia Federal Route 1524	Jalan Utama Kota Gelanggi - Lepar Utara	
FT 1525	Malaysia Federal Route 1525	Jalan Lepar Utara Bandar A dan Kilang A	
FT 1526	Malaysia Federal Route 1526	Jalan Lepar Utara Bandar B dan Kilang B	
FT 1527	Malaysia Federal Route 1527	Jalan FELDA Kampung Awah	
FT 1528	Malaysia Federal Route 1528	Jalan FELDA Kampung Awah (kilang sawit)	
FT 1529	Malaysia Federal Route 1529	Jalan FELDA Sungai Nerek	
FT 1530	Malaysia Federal Route 1530	Jalan FELDA Sungai Tekam Utara	
FT 1531	Malaysia Federal Route 1531	Jalan Ulu Jempol	
FT 1533	Malaysia Federal Route 1533	Jalan Utama Jengka Utara-Barat	
FT 1534	Malaysia Federal Route 1534	Jalan Utama Jengka 8, 9, 12 dan 13	
FT 1535	Malaysia Federal Route 1535	Jalan Utama Jengka 18, 21, 23 dan 25	
FT 1536	Malaysia Federal Route 1536	Jalan Utama Jengka 1 - 10	
FT 1537	Malaysia Federal Route 1537	Jalan Utama Jengka Barat-Timur	
FT 1538	Malaysia Federal Route 1538	Jalan Utama Jengka 6 dan 7	
FT 1539	Malaysia Federal Route 1539	Jalan Jengka 21 (kilang sawit)	
FT 1540	Malaysia Federal Route 1540	Jalan Jengka 18A (kilang sawit)	
FT 1541	Malaysia Federal Route 1541	Jalan Jengka 18B (kilang sawit)	
FT 1542	Malaysia Federal Route 1542	Jalan Jengka 1	
FT 1543	Malaysia Federal Route 1543	Jalan Jengka 4	
FT 1544	Malaysia Federal Route 1544	Jalan Jengka 5	
FT 1545	Malaysia Federal Route 1545	Jalan Jengka 9	
FT 1546	Malaysia Federal Route 1546	Jalan Jengka 10	
FT 1547	Malaysia Federal Route 1547	Jalan Jengka 11	
FT 1548	Malaysia Federal Route 1548	Jalan Jengka 13	
FT 1549	Malaysia Federal Route 1549	Jalan Jengka 14	
FT 1550	Malaysia Federal Route 1550	Jalan Jengka 20	
FT 1551	Malaysia Federal Route 1551	Jalan Jengka 22	
FT 1552	Malaysia Federal Route 1552	Jalan Jengka 24	
FT 1553	Malaysia Federal Route 1553	Jalan Jengka 25	
FT 1554	Malaysia Federal Route 1554	Jalan PPP Tun Razak	
FT 1555	Malaysia Federal Route 1555	Jalan FELDA Keratong 3A dan 3B (kilang sawit)	
FT 1556	Malaysia Federal Route 1556	Jalan FELDA Keratong 9 (kelapa sawit)	
FT 1557	Malaysia Federal Route 1557	Jalan FELDA Chini 1A (kelapa sawit)	
FT 1558	Malaysia Federal Route 1558	Jalan FELDA Chini 2 (kelapa sawit)	
FT 1559	Malaysia Federal Route 1559	Jalan FELDA Selancar 2 dan 2B (kelapa sawit)	
FT 1560	Malaysia Federal Route 1560	Jalan FELDA Selendang (kelapa sawit)	
FT 1561	Malaysia Federal Route 1561	Jalan FELDA Chini Timur 1, 2 dan 3	
FT 1562	Malaysia Federal Route 1562	Jalan FELDA Lepar Hilir 3 dan 5	
FT 1563	Malaysia Federal Route 1563	Jalan FELDA Lepar Hilir 4, 6 dan 7	
FT 1564	Malaysia Federal Route 1564	Jalan FELDA Triang 1	
FT 1565	Malaysia Federal Route 1565	Jalan FELDA Bera Selatan Fasa 2	
FT 1566	Malaysia Federal Route 1566	Jalan FELDA Bera Selatan Fasa 3	
FT 1567	Malaysia Federal Route 1567	Jalan FELDA Bera Selatan Fasa 4	
FT 1568	Malaysia Federal Route 1568	Jalan FELDA Triang	
FT 1569	Malaysia Federal Route 1569	Jalan FELDA Triang Selatan Fasa 2	
FT 1570	Malaysia Federal Route 1570	Jalan FELDA Lepar Hilir 3	
FT 1571	Malaysia Federal Route 1571	Jalan FELDA Lepar Hilir 5	
FT 1572	Malaysia Federal Route 1572	Jalan Sebertak-Bera Selatan	
FT 1573	Malaysia Federal Route 1573	Jalan FELDA Kecau 7 (kilang sawit)	
FT 1574	Malaysia Federal Route 1574	Jalan FELDA Kerau (kilang sawit)	
FT 1575	Malaysia Federal Route 1575	Jalan FELDA Kerau (kilang sawit)	
FT 1576	Malaysia Federal Route 1576	Jalan Kerau - Lembah Kelau - Mempaga	
FT 1577	Malaysia Federal Route 1577	Jalan FELDA Kecau 8, 9 dan 10	
FT 1578	Malaysia Federal Route 1578	Jalan FELDA Kecau 4, 11 dan 12	
FT 1579	Malaysia Federal Route 1579	Jalan Palong 16-Tembangau	
FT 1580	Malaysia Federal Route 1580	Jalan FELDA Bera Selatan 3	
FT 1580	Malaysia Federal Route 1580	Jalan FELDA Bera Selatan 3	
FT 1581	Malaysia Federal Route 1581	Jalan Bukit Sagu-Cerul	
FT 1582	Malaysia Federal Route 1582	Jalan FELDA Kecau 8, 9 dan 10 (baki)	
FT 1583	Malaysia Federal Route 1583	Jalan Terapal - Mayam	
FT 1739	Malaysia Federal Route 1739	Jalan FELDA Kemahang	
FT 1744	Malaysia Federal Route 1744	Jalan FELDA Aring	
FT 2484	Malaysia Federal Route 2484	Jalan Bandar Chini	
FT 2486	Malaysia Federal Route 2486	Jalan Kota Perdana	
FT 2489	Malaysia Federal Route 2489	Jalan Kota Bahagia-Melati	

== Sabah ==
Highway shield	Name	Name of roads	Highways
