= Malaysia Federal Route 63 =

Road in Malaysia

Federal Route 63

Route information
- Maintained by Malaysian Public Works Department
- Length: 72.83 km (45.25 mi)

Major junctions
- Northwest end: Bukit Ibam
- FT 12 / AH142 Tun Razak Highway FT 3 / AH18 Federal Route 3
- Southeast end: Bandar Baru Rompin

Location
- Country: Malaysia
- Primary destinations: Gambang, Bandar Muadzam Shah, Segamat

Highway system
- Highways in Malaysia; Expressways; Federal; State

Federal Route 63 is a federal road in Pahang, Malaysia, linking the town of Bukit Ibam and Bandar Muadzam Shah to the town of Bandar Baru Rompin. The road was built at the site of a defunct light railway track from Bukit Ibam to Kuala Rompin.

== Route background ==
The Kilometre Zero of the Federal Route 63 starts at Bukit Ibam and ends at its intersection with the Federal Route 3, the main trunk road of the east coast of Peninsular Malaysia.

== History ==
The Federal Route 63, together with Jalan Lanjut (Pahang State Route 110), was constructed as a light railway track by Eastern Mining & Mineral Company (EMCO) (later ROMPINCO) from Bukit Ibam to Kampung Lanjut near Kuala Rompin to transport iron ore. The construction of the railway was started in 1955 right after the state government of Pahang granted permission to EMCO to open an iron mine at Bukit Ibam. However, the railway service was short-lived and was closed down in 1960s after the iron mine was shut down. As a result, the light railway track was dismantled at the end of 1960 and was replaced by two paved roads instead (Federal Route 63 and Pahang State Route 110).

== Features ==
At most sections, the Federal Route 63 was built under the JKR R4 road standard, allowing maximum speed limit of up to 90 km/h.

== Junction and town lists ==
The entire route is located in Pahang.

Legend:

- I/C - Interchange, I/S - Intersection, RSA - Rest and service area, OBR - Overhead bridge restaurant, R/R - Restaurant and rest plaza, L/B - Layby, V/P - Vista point, TN - tunnel, T/P - Toll plaza, BR - Bridge
- C - Cloverleaf, S - Stack, T-A - Trumpet-A, T-B - Trumpet-B, DT - Directional-T/Y, SDT - Semi-Directional-T/Y, P-Y - Partial-Y, D - Diamond, P-C - Partial cloverleaf, D-D - Diverging diamond, D-R - Direct ramp

District	Location	km	mi	Name	Destinations	Notes
Rompin	Bukit Ibam	0.0	0.0	Bukit Ibam		
Rompin	Kampung Ayer Molek			Kampung Ayer Molek		
Rompin	Kampung Ayer Molek			Sungai Anur bridge		
Rompin	Bandar Muadzam Shah			Bandar Muadzam Shah	FT 12 / AH142 Tun Razak Highway – Gambang, Kuantan, Maran, Kuala Lumpur, Kuala Terengganu, Bandar Tun Abdul Razak, Jempol, Seremban, Segamat, Gemas, Bera Lake, Johor Bahru	Diamond interchange
Rompin	Bandar Muadzam Shah			Bandar Muadzam Shah	Persiaran Dara – Town Centre, Desa Mawar, Desa Dahlia, Desa Kenanga, Taman Puspalipur, Teras Dara Konsortium main headquarters, Maktab Rendah Sains Mara (MRSM) Muadzam Shah, Universiti Tenaga Nasional (Uniten) Kampus Sultan Haji Ahmad Shah	T-junctions
Rompin	Bandar Muadzam Shah			Politeknik Muadzam Shah	Politeknik Muadzam Shah	
Rompin	Bandar Muadzam Shah			Bandar Muadzam Shah	Jalan Bandar Muadzam Shah – Town Centre, Hospital Muadzam Shah, Masjid Al-Muadzam Shah	T-junctions
Pekan	Kampung Kundang			Kampung Kundang		
Rompin	Kuala Rompin			Kampung Orang Asli Kedaik		
Rompin	Kuala Rompin			Kampung Petuh		
Rompin	Kuala Rompin			Kampung Tanam		
Rompin	Kuala Rompin			Kampung Jemeri		
Rompin	Kuala Rompin			Kampung Kerpal		
Rompin	Kuala Rompin			Kampung Pinang		
Rompin	Kuala Rompin			Kampung Rahang		
Rompin	Kuala Rompin			Kampung Belangkap		
Rompin	Kuala Rompin			Kampung Batu Bangkung		
Rompin	Kuala Rompin			Kampung Sungai Terap		
Rompin	Kuala Rompin			Kampung Padang		
Rompin	Kuala Rompin			Kampung Gading		
Rompin	Kuala Rompin	72.83	45.25	Bandar Baru Rompin; Kampung Leban Condong	FT 3 / AH18 Malaysia Federal Route 3 – Kuantan, Pekan, Nenasi, Bandar Baru Rompin, Kuala Rompin, Endau, Mersing, Kota Tinggi, Johor Bahru	T-junctions
1.000 mi = 1.609 km; 1.000 km = 0.621 mi
