= Tun Razak Highway =

Road in Malaysia

Coordinates: 3°3′30.7″N 103°3′41.1″E

Federal Route 12
- Tun Razak Highway (Segamat-Kuantan Highway)

Route information
- Part of AH142
- Maintained by Malaysian Public Works Department
- Length: 146.8 km (91.2 mi)
- Existed: 1970–present
- History: Completed in 1983

Major junctions
- North end: Gambang, Kuantan, Pahang
- East Coast Expressway / AH141 FT 222 / AH142 Tun Khalil Yaakob Highway; FT 2 Federal Route 2 FT 2 Gambang–Kuantan Highway; FT 82 Federal Route 82; FT 2484 Jalan Bandar Chini; FT 63 Federal Route 63; FT 11 Bahau–Keratong Highway; FT 1 Federal Route 1
- South end: Segamaat, Johor

Location
- Country: Malaysia
- Primary destinations: Kuantan, Paluh Hinai, Pekan, Bandar Muadzam Shah, Bandar Tun Abdul Razak, Bahau

Highway system
- Highways in Malaysia; Expressways; Federal; State

Tun Razak Highway, Federal Route 12 (Malay: Lebuhraya Tun Razak; Chinese: 敦拉萨快速公路; Jawi: لبوهرایا تون رزاق), also known as Segamat-Kuantan Highway (Malay: Lebuhraya Segamat-Kuantan; Chinese: 昔加末–关丹快速公路; Jawi: لبوهرایا سغامت–كوانتن), Asian Highway Route 142, is a 146.8 kilometres (91 mi) federal highway running from the town of Segamat, Johor to Gambang before proceeding another 38 kilometres (24 mi) via Federal Route 2 to Gambang near Kuantan, Pahang. This two-lane federal road is named in honor of Tun Abdul Razak, Malaysia's second Prime Minister who was also known as Malaysia's Father of Development. The highway is part of the Asian Highway Network of route 142.

== Route background ==
The Kilometre Zero of the Federal Route 12 is located at Segamat, Johor, at its intersection with the Federal Route 1, the main trunk road of the central of Peninsular Malaysia. Next, the highway passes the Johor-Pahang border near Perwira Jaya at Pahang side.

The Federal Route 12 intersects the Bera Highway (Federal Route 11) at Bandar Tun Abdul Razak. Next, the highway overpasses the Federal Route 63 at Bandar Muadzam Shah Interchange. After that, the highway crosses the Pahang River at Paluh Hinai, Pekan. Finally, the highway ends at Gambang, Kuantan, Pahang, at its 4-way intersection with the Federal Route 2, the main trunk road of the east and west coasts of Peninsula Malaysia.

== History ==
The Tun Razak Highway is the brainchild of Sultan of Pahang, Sultan Haji Ahmad Shah. The construction of the highway began in 1970 and was completed in 1983. Sultan Haji Ahmad Shah himself inaugurated the Tun Razak Highway in 1983 when he was the Yang di-Pertuan Agong at that time. The Tun Razak Highway was gazetted as the Federal Route 12 on 19 October 1989.

Built under Malaysia's New Economic Policy, this 2-lane federal highway is built with reasons as follows:-

- To shorten the traveling distance time from southwestern towns and cities such as Segamat, Tangkak, Muar, Batu Pahat and Melaka to eastern states of Peninsular Malaysia.
- To speed up the development of the poorly developed areas in southern Pahang.

Even though the highway is generally straight with less sharp corners, the Tun Razak Highway is notorious for its many accidents due to the steady increase of traffic. On 20 June 2010, Malaysian Ministry of Works, Datuk Shaziman Abu Mansor, proposed the Tun Razak Highway to be upgraded to a four-lane highway as a preventive measure to reduce accidents. Instead, the highway was upgraded to JKR R5 standard with wider medians, roadside and single-carriageway lanes. The upgrade project began in September 2015, with the first phase involving the 47-km segment from Gambang to Paloh Hinai, with the cost of RM300 million. The second phase, which would involve the upgrade works of the remaining 100 km from Paloh Hinai to Segamat, would cost RM1.2 billion.

== Features ==
=== Notable features ===
- Paluh Hinai Bridge crosses Pahang River at Paluh Hinai, Pekan, Pahang.
- One diamond interchange at Bandar Muadzam Shah, Rompin, Pahang.
- There are numerous of rest and service areas (R&R) along the highway such as those at Paluh Hinai, Bandar Muadzam Shah and RISDA Keratong.

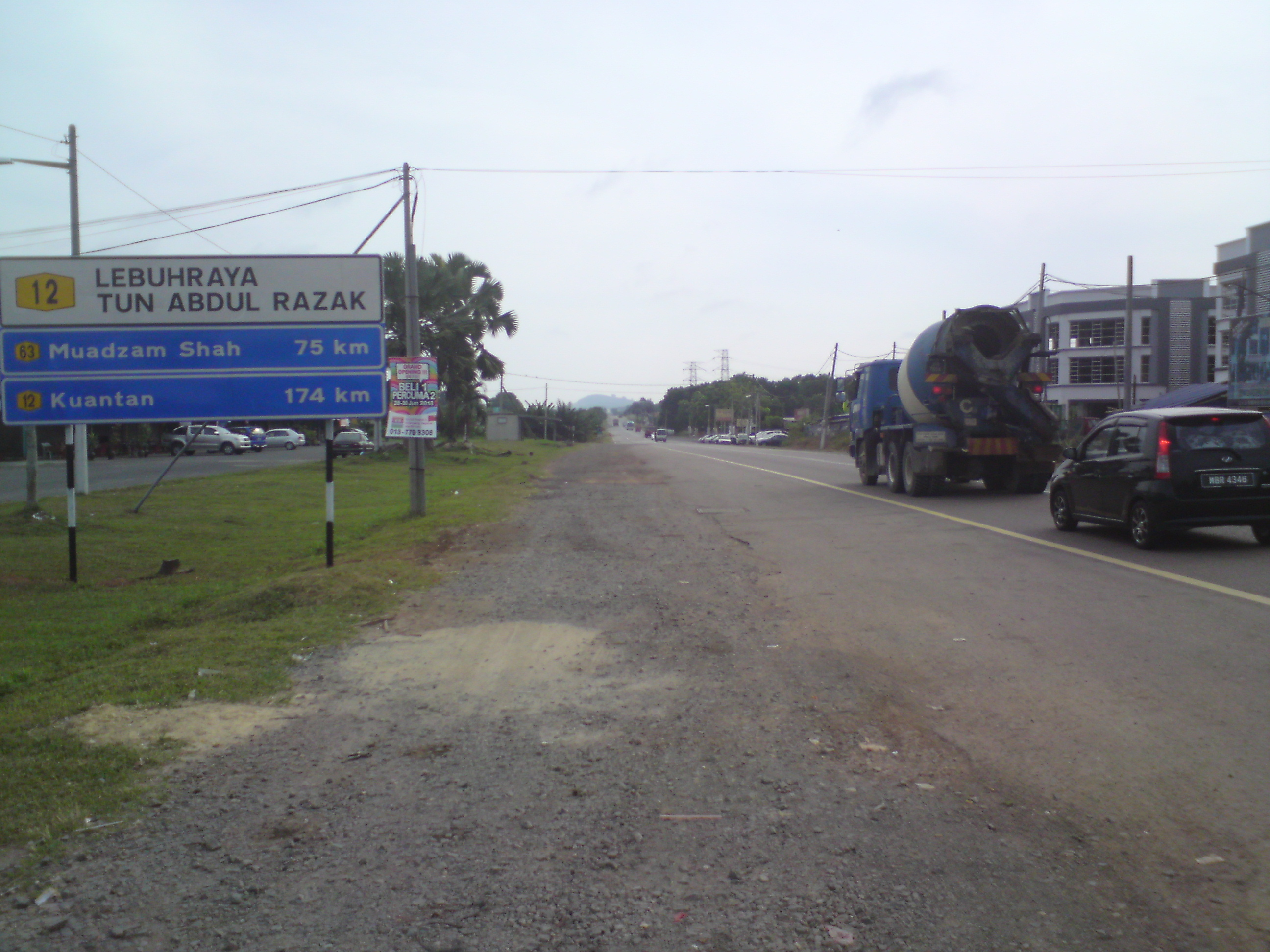
Tun Razak Highway runs from Segamat, Johor to Gambang, Kuantan, Pahang.

At most sections, the Federal Route 12 was built under the JKR R5 road standard, allowing maximum speed limit of up to 90 km/h.

Pahang State Route 106 Jalan Belimbing–Pahang Tua (1.1 km) overlaps with Tun Razak Highway. There are no alternate routes or sections with motorcycle lanes.

== Interchange, intersection and town lists ==
Legend:

- I/C - Interchange, I/S - Intersection, RSA - Rest and service area, OBR - Overhead bridge restaurant, R/R - Restaurant and rest plaza, L/B - Layby, V/P - Vista point, TN - tunnel, T/P - Toll plaza, BR - Bridge
- C - Cloverleaf, S - Stack, T-A - Trumpet-A, T-B - Trumpet-B, DT - Directional-T/Y, SDT - Semi-Directional-T/Y, P-Y - Partial-Y, D - Diamond, P-C - Partial cloverleaf, D-D - Diverging diamond, D-R - Direct ramp

State	District	km	Exit	Name	Destinations	Notes
Through to FT 222 / AH142 Tun Khalil Yaakob Highway
Pahang	Kuantan	146.8	17	Gambang I/S	FT 2 Jalan Gambang – Gambang, Maran, Temerloh, Kuantan	
Pahang	Kuantan	146.8	RSA	Gambang RSA	Gambang RSA – Caltex	Segamat bound
Pahang	Kuantan		BR	Sungai Belat bridge		
Pahang	Kuantan		16	Kampung Sungai Semuji I/S	Agro Resort Sungai Semuji	
Pahang	Kuantan			Kampung Dagon		
Pahang	Kuantan		15	Felda Lepar Hilir I/S	Jalan Felda Lepar Hilir – Felda Lepar Hilir	
Pahang	Kuantan	139.0	LB	Caltex L/B	Caltex L/B – Caltex	Kuantan bound
Pahang	Kuantan			Kampung Batu Lima		
Pahang	Kuantan			Kampung Batu Enam		
Pahang	Pekan			Lepar		
Pahang	Pekan			Kampung Kecupu		
Pahang	Pekan	127.0	LB	BHPetrol L/B	BHPetrol L/B – BH Petrol	Segamat bound
Pahang	Pekan		14	Paluh Hinai North I/S	C106 Jalan Belimbing–Pahang Tua – Belimbing, Lubuk Paku	Overlaps with C106 (1.1 km)
Pahang	Pekan		13	Paluh Hinai North I/S	C106 Jalan Belimbing–Pahang Tua – Permatang Lanjut, Pahang Tua	Overlaps with C106 (1.1 km)
Pahang	Pekan		BR	Pahang River bridge		
Pahang	Pekan		12	Paluh Hinai I/S	FT 82 Jalan Batu Balik – Pekan; C108 Jalan Mengkarak–Paluh Hinai – Chenor, Mengkarak, Bera, Teriang, Lake Chini	
Pahang	Pekan		RSA	Paluh Hinai RSA	Paluh Hinai RSA –	Kuantan bound
Pahang	Pekan			JPJ Enforcement Station		Segamat bound
Pahang	Pekan			Bandar Dua Paluh Hinai		
Pahang	Pekan		11	Jalan Bandar Chini I/S	Jalan Bandar Chini – Bandar Chini, Bandar Satu Paluh Hinai, Lake Chini	
Pahang	Pekan	107.0	RSA	Chini RSA	Chini RSA –	Segamat bound
Pahang	Pekan			Kampung Cawai		
Pahang	Pekan		10	Kota Perdana I/S	FT 2486 Jalan Kota Perdana – Kota Perdana	
Pahang	Pekan			Kampung Kelentok		
Pahang	Pekan		9	Bandar Muadzam Shah I/S	Jalan Bandar Muadzam Shah – Bandar Muadzam Shah town center, Universiti Tenaga Nasional (Uniten) Kampus Muadzam Shah	
Pahang	Pekan	73.0	RSA	Bandar Muadzam Shah R//R (RSA)	Bandar Muadzam Shah R//R (RSA) – Petronas	Both bounds
Pahang	Pekan		8	Bandar Muadzam Shah I/C	FT 63 Federal Route 63 – Bukit Ibam, Kuala Rompin, Endau, Mersing	
Pahang	Rompin			Gadak Orang Asli Village		
Pahang	Rompin		BR	Sungai Rompin bridge		
Pahang	Rompin			Kampung Jemekat		
Pahang	Rompin		I/S	Felda Keratong I/S	Felda Keratong	
Pahang	Rompin		7	Kota Bahagia-Melati I/S	Jalan Kota Bahagia-Melati – Kota Bahagia, Kota Iskandar, Melati, Bandar Bera, Tasik Bera	
Pahang	Rompin		BR	Sungai Keratong bridge		
Pahang	Rompin		I/S	Felda Keratong 10 I/S	Felda Keratong 10	
Pahang	Rompin		BR	Sungai Pesek bridge		
Pahang	Rompin		6	Bandar Tun Abdul Razak I/S	FT 11 Bahau-Keratong Highway – Bandar Tun Abdul Razak, Kota Shahbandar, Bandar Seri Jempol, Bahau, Seremban, Tasik Bera	
Pahang	Rompin			Felda Keratong 5 I/S	Felda Keratong 5	
Pahang	Rompin		5	Chanis I/S	Jalan Chanis – Chanis, Felda Keratong 6 & 7	
Pahang	Rompin		BR	Sungai Keratong bridge		
Pahang	Rompin		RSA	Risda Keratong RSA	Risda Keratong RSA –	Segamat bound
Pahang	Rompin			JPJ Enforcement Station		Segamat bound
Pahang	Rompin			Chenderawasih I/S	Jalan Chenderawasih – Chenderawasih	
Pahang	Rompin			Pekoti Timur		
Pahang	Rompin		4	Perwira Jaya I/S	Jalan Perwira Jaya – Perwira Jaya, Felda Selancar	
Johor	Segamat			Kampung Cempaka		
Johor	Segamat		3	Felda Pemanis I/S	Jalan Felda Pemanis – Felda Pemanis	
Johor	Segamat		BR	Sungai Kapeh bridge		
Johor	Segamat		2	Kampung Bangas I/S	J155 Jalan Kuala Paya – Kg. Kuala Paya, Buloh Kasap; J158 Jalan Sepinang – Kg. Sepinang, Kg. Gelang Cincin	
Johor	Segamat			Kampung Tadok		
Johor	Segamat			Petronas Natural Gas; Operation Centre, Segamat	Petronas Natural Gas Operation Centre, Segamat	
Johor	Segamat		RSA	Segamat fruit stalls	Segamat fruit stalls –	Kuantan bound
Johor	Segamat	1.1	I/S	Taman Yayasan	Taman Yayasan	
Johor	Segamat	0.0	1	Tun Abdul Razak I/S	FT 1 / AH142 Jalan Buloh Kasap – Segamat town centre, Buloh Kasap, Gemas, Tangkak, Muar, Tampin, Seremban, Labis, Chaah, Johor Bahru	
