= Malaysia Federal Route 11 =

Road in Malaysia

Federal Route 11
- Bahau-Keratong Highway

Route information
- Maintained by Malaysian Public Works Department
- Length: 61.33 km (38.11 mi)
- Existed: 1970–present
- History: Completed in 1982

Major junctions
- West end: Serting, Negeri Sembilan
- FT 9 Federal Route 9 FT 10 Federal Route 10; FT 1579 Jalan Palong 16-Tembangau; FT 44 Jalan Utama Palong; FT 1572 Jalan Sebertak-Bera Selatan FT 12 (Tun Razak Highway) / AH142
- East end: Bandar Tun Abdul Razak, Pahang

Location
- Country: Malaysia
- Primary destinations: Bandar Seri Jempol, Bahau, Kota Shahbandar

Highway system
- Highways in Malaysia; Expressways; Federal; State

Federal Route 11 or Bahau-Keratong Highway, is a federal highway in Malaysia which links Serting to Bandar Tun Abdul Razak. The 61.3 kilometres (38 mi) roads passes through Kampung Tengah, Tasik Bera, and Kota Shahbandar and crosses the state border between the Negeri Sembilan and Pahang.

The Kilometre Zero is located at Serting in Negeri Sembilan.

At most sections, the Federal Route 11 was built under the JKR R5 road standard, allowing maximum speed limit of up to 90 km/h.

== Junction lists ==
Legend:

- I/C - Interchange, I/S - Intersection, RSA - Rest and service area, OBR - Overhead bridge restaurant, R/R - Restaurant and rest plaza, L/B - Layby, V/P - Vista point, TN - tunnel, T/P - Toll plaza, BR - Bridge
- C - Cloverleaf, S - Stack, T-A - Trumpet-A, T-B - Trumpet-B, DT - Directional-T/Y, SDT - Semi-Directional-T/Y, P-Y - Partial-Y, D - Diamond, P-C - Partial cloverleaf, D-D - Diverging diamond, D-R - Direct ramp

| State | District | Location | km | mi | Exit | Name | Destinations | Notes |
|---|---|---|---|---|---|---|---|---|
| Negeri Sembilan | Jempol | Serting | 0.0 | 0.0 | 1 | Serting; Serting I/S | FT 9 Malaysia Federal Route 9 – Pertang, Kuala Klawang, Karak, Bentong, Ulu Serting Recreational Park, Genting Highlands, Batu Kikir, Kuala Pilah, Sri Menanti, Seremban, Tampin | T-junctions |
| Negeri Sembilan | Jempol | Bandar Seri Jempol | | | Railway crossing | | | |
| Negeri Sembilan | Jempol | Bandar Seri Jempol | | | | Bandar Seri Jempol | Masjid Tuanku Muhriz Daerah Jempol, Jempol District and Land Office | T-junctions |
| Negeri Sembilan | Jempol | Bandar Seri Jempol | | | 2 | Bandar Seri Jempol; Bandar Seri Jempol I/S | FT 10 Malaysia Federal Route 10 – Temerloh, Bandar Bera, Triang, Kemayan, Bahau, Rompin, Gemas | Junctions |
| Negeri Sembilan | Jempol | Bandar Seri Jempol | | | Sungai Serting bridge | | | |
| Negeri Sembilan | Jempol | Bandar Seri Jempol | | | Sungai Tebu bridge | | | |
| Negeri Sembilan | Jempol | Bandar Seri Jempol | | | 3 | Jalan Palong 16-Tembangau I/S | FT 1579 Jalan Palong 16-Tembangau – Tembangau, Bandar Bera, Triang | T-junctions |
| Pahang | Rompin | Bandar Tun Abdul Razak | | | Road Transport Department Malaysia (JPJ) enforcement stations | | | |
| Pahang | Rompin | Bandar Tun Abdul Razak | | | 4 | Jalan Utama Palong I/S | FT 44 Jalan Utama Palong – FELDA Palong 1-16, FELDA Palong Timur | T-junctions |
| Pahang | Rompin | Bandar Tun Abdul Razak | | | 5 | Jalan Sebertak-Bera Selatan I/S | FT 1572 Jalan Sebertak-Bera Selatan – Kota Iskandar, Kota Bahagia, Sebertak, Bandar Bera, Bera Lake | T-junctions |
| Pahang | Rompin | Bandar Tun Abdul Razak | | | 6 | Kota Shahbandar; Kota Shahbandar I/S | Kota Shahbandar, Cempaka | T-junctions |
| Pahang | Rompin | Bandar Tun Abdul Razak | | | | Kampung Tengah | | |
| Pahang | Rompin | Bandar Tun Abdul Razak | | | Sungai Keratong bridge | | | |
| Pahang | Rompin | Bandar Tun Abdul Razak | | | 7 | FELDA Keratong 2 I/S | FELDA Keratong 2 | T-junctions |
| Pahang | Rompin | Bandar Tun Abdul Razak | | | 8 | Bandar Tun Abdul Razak; Bandar Tun Abdul Razak I/S | FELDA Keratong 3, FELDA Keratong 4 | T-junctions |
| Pahang | Rompin | Bandar Tun Abdul Razak | | | 9 | FELDA Keratong 5 I/S | FELDA Keratong 5 | T-junctions |
| Pahang | Rompin | Bandar Tun Abdul Razak | | | 10 | Bandar Tun Abdul Razak; Tun Razak Highway I/S | FT 12 (Tun Razak Highway) / AH142 – Kuantan, Gambang, Bandar Muadzam Shah, Segamat, Muar East Coast Expressway / AH141 – Kuala Lumpur, Kuala Terengganu; North–South Expressway Southern Route / FT 1 / AH2 – Johor Bahru | T-junctions |
1.000 mi = 1.609 km; 1.000 km = 0.621 mi
