= Malaysia Federal Route 44 =

Road in Malaysia

Federal Route 44
- Jalan Utama Palong

Route information
- Maintained by Malaysian Public Works Department
- Length: 30.2 km (18.8 mi)

Major junctions
- South end: Pasir Besar
- FT 10 Federal Route 10; FT 11 Federal Route 11
- North end: Keratong

Location
- Country: Malaysia
- Primary destinations: FELDA Palong 1-16

Highway system
- Highways in Malaysia; Expressways; Federal; State

Federal Route 44, also known as Jalan Utama Palong or formerly Federal Route 1283, is a main federal road straddling the districts of Tampin, Jempol and Bera, respectively located in the states of Negeri Sembilan and Pahang, Malaysia. It is the main road to link the FELDA settlements of Palong area to Federal Routes 10 and 11.

At most sections, the Federal Route 44 was built under the JKR R5 road standard, allowing maximum speed limit of up to 90 km/h.

== History ==
In Federal Roads (West Malaysia) (Amendment) (No.11) Order 2024, major part of Federal Route 1283 from Federal Route 10 junctions to Negeri Sembilan and Pahang state boundaries gazetted as Federal Route 44. In Federal Roads (West Malaysia) (Amendment) (No.13) Order 2024, the remain part of Federal Route 1283 from Federal Route 11 junctions to Negeri Sembilan–Pahang state boundaries is gazetted as part of Federal Route 44. Whole sections of Federal Route 1283 is become Federal Route 44.

== Junction lists ==
Legend:

- I/C - Interchange, I/S - Intersection, RSA - Rest and service area, OBR - Overhead bridge restaurant, R/R - Restaurant and rest plaza, L/B - Layby, V/P - Vista point, TN - tunnel, T/P - Toll plaza, BR - Bridge
- C - Cloverleaf, S - Stack, T-A - Trumpet-A, T-B - Trumpet-B, DT - Directional-T/Y, SDT - Semi-Directional-T/Y, P-Y - Partial-Y, D - Diamond, P-C - Partial cloverleaf, D-D - Diverging diamond, D-R - Direct ramp

State	District	Location	km	mi	Name	Destinations	Notes
Negeri Sembilan	Tampin	Gemas			Pasir Besar	FT 10 Malaysia Federal Route 10 – Bahau, Kuala Pilah, Gemas, Tampin, Segamat	T-junctions
Negeri Sembilan	Tampin–Jempol District border				Railway crossing		
Negeri Sembilan	Jempol	FELDA Palong			FELDA Palong 1	FELDA Palong 1	T-junction
Negeri Sembilan	Jempol	FELDA Palong			FELDA Palong 2	FT 1286 – FELDA Palong 2	T-junction
Negeri Sembilan	Jempol	FELDA Palong			FELDA Palong 3	FT 1287 – FELDA Palong 3	T-junction
Negeri Sembilan	Jempol	FELDA Palong			FELDA Palong 4–6	FT 1288 – FELDA Palong 4, FELDA Palong 5, FELDA Palong 6, FELDA Palong Timur	T-junction
Negeri Sembilan	Jempol	FELDA Palong			FELDA Palong 7–8	FT 1289 – FELDA Palong 7, FELDA Palong 8	T-junction
Negeri Sembilan	Jempol	FELDA Palong			FELDA Palong 9–11	FT 1290 – FELDA Palong 9, FELDA Palong 10, FELDA Palong 11	T-junction
Negeri Sembilan	Jempol	FELDA Palong			FELDA Palong 12–13	FT 1291 – FELDA Palong 12, FELDA Palong 13	T-junction
Negeri Sembilan	Jempol	FELDA Palong			FELDA Palong 14–16	FELDA Palong 14, FELDA Palong 15, FELDA Palong 16	T-junction
Pahang	Rompin	Keratong			Malaysia Federal Route 11	FT 11 Malaysia Federal Route 11 – Bandar Baru Serting, Bandar Tun Abdul Razak, Muadzam Shah, Kuantan, Segamat	T-junction
1.000 mi = 1.609 km; 1.000 km = 0.621 mi
