= Lanjut Airstrip =

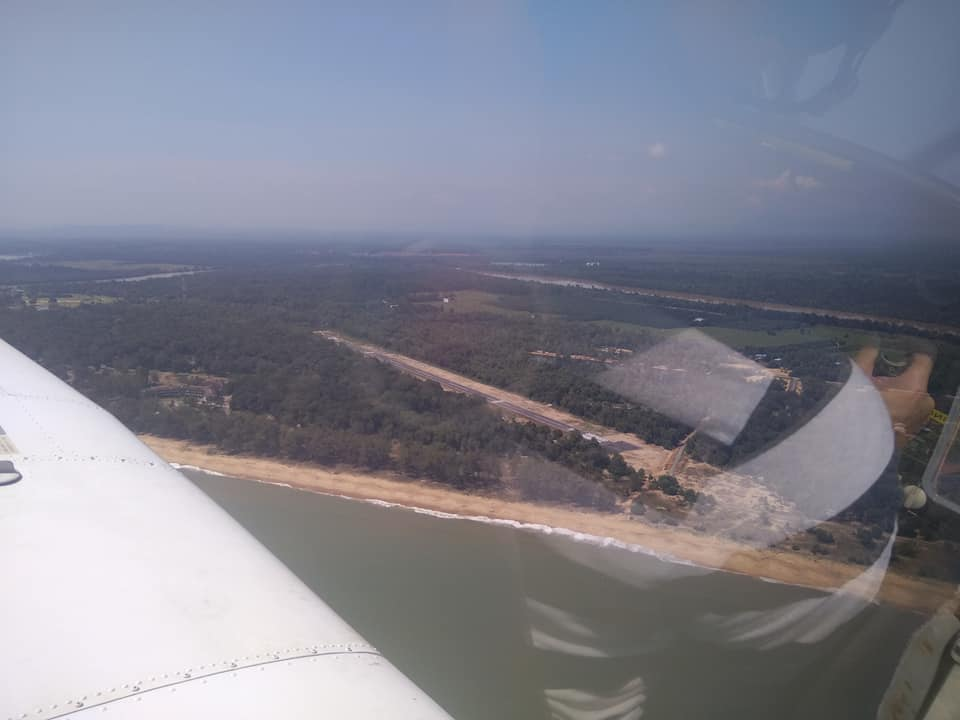
- A light aircraft approaching Lanjut Airstrip Runway 18
- IATA: none; ICAO: none

Summary
- Airport type: Public with prior permission
- Owner: Private operator
- Operator: Private operator
- Serves: Kuala Rompin
- Location: Rompin, Pahang, Malaysia
- Time zone: MST (UTC+08:00)
- Elevation AMSL: 15 ft (4.6 m)
- Coordinates: 02°51′14″N 103°27′19″E

Maps
- Rompin state in Malaysia

- Location in Rompin, West Malaysia Lanjut Airstrip (Malaysia) Lanjut Airstrip (Southeast Asia) Lanjut Airstrip (Asia)

Runways
Direction	Length		Surface
Direction	m	ft	Surface
18/36	761	2,497	Tarmac

Lanjut Airstrip is an airfield serving Rompin, Pahang, Malaysia. It is located next to the popular old Lanjut Beach and Golf Resort, just north of the Rompin river.

The airfield currently has no scheduled airline operations. Most arriving aircraft are those from the regional flying clubs and those owned by private individuals. Due to the short runway at just 781 meters by 16 meters wide, the airstrip limits potential commercial aviation operators from commencing public air services. The recommended landing direction is runway 18, and pilots are to exercise caution as wildlife and loose materials have been reported near the runway. Resort guests from the nearby Lanjut Beach and Golf resort have been spotted riding their bikes on the airstrip. Prior permission is required for arriving private aircraft, so that resort staff are able to assist with arrival procedures.

== Gallery ==
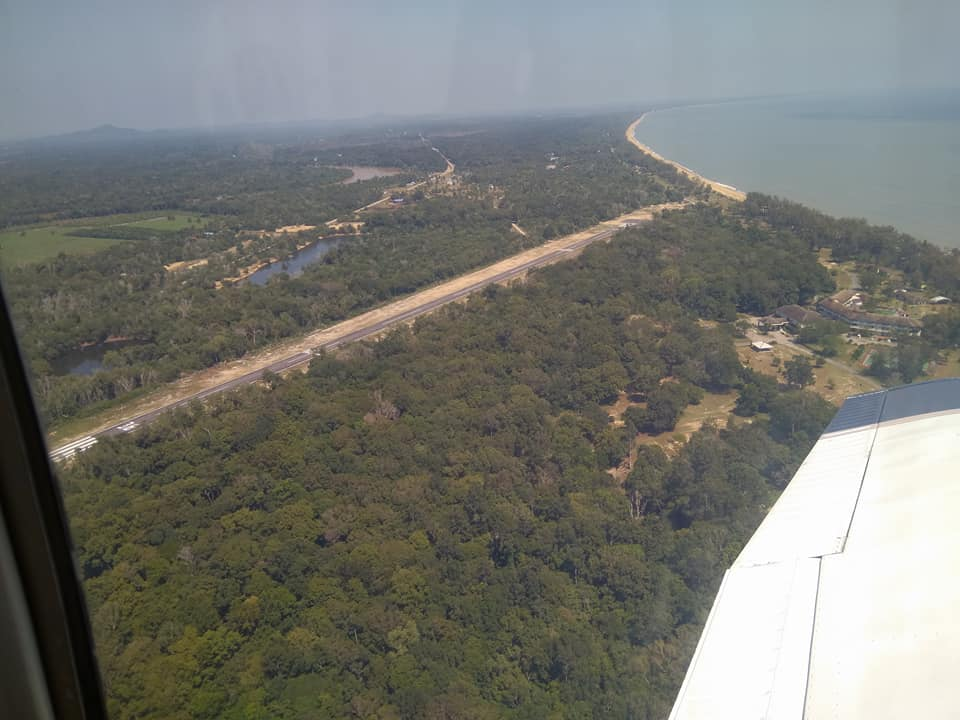
Overhead view of Lanjut Airstrip

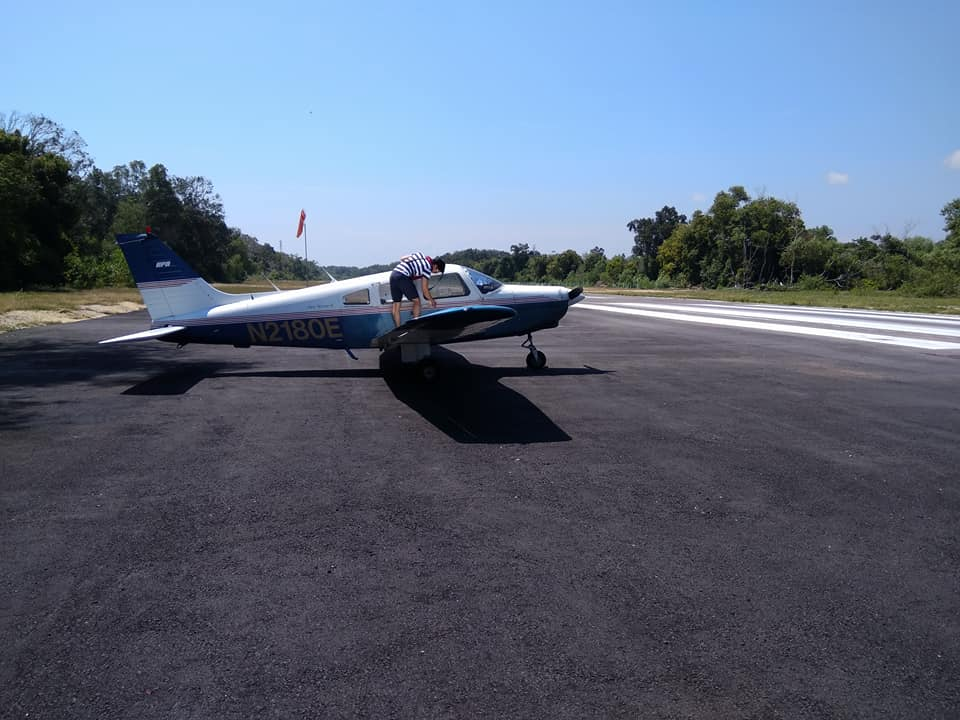
Seletar Flying Club's Piper PA28 during a stopover at Lanjut Airstrip apron area

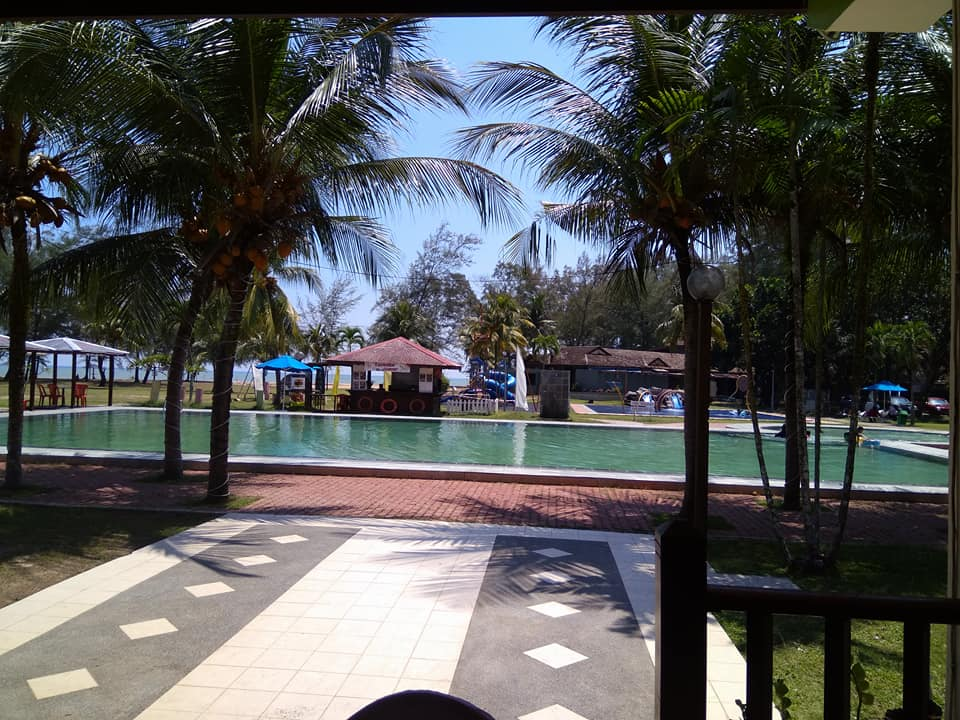
A view of the pool area of the old Lanjut Beach and Golf Resort
