= Jalan Utama Bera =

Road in Malaysia

Federal Route 1510
- Jalan Utama Bera

Route information
- Maintained by Malaysian Public Works Department

Major junctions
- West end: Bandar Bera
- FT 10 Federal Route 10; FT 1572 Jalan Sebertak-Bera Selatan
- East end: Sebertak

Location
- Country: Malaysia
- Primary destinations: FELDA Rentam; Kota Iskandar; Tasik Bera

Highway system
- Highways in Malaysia; Expressways; Federal; State

Jalan Utama Bera, Federal Route 1510, is a federal road in Pahang, Malaysia. It is a main route to Sebertak, Kota Bahagia, Bandar Muadzam Shah, and Tasik Bera. At most sections, the Federal Route 1510 was built under the JKR R5 road standard, allowing maximum speed limit of up to 90 km/h.

== List of junctions ==
=== Main roads ===
Km	Exit	Junctions	To	Remarks
		Bandar Bera	North; FT 10 Temerloh; FT 2 Kuantan; East Coast Expressway AH141 East Coast Expressway; Kuala Lumpur; Kuala Terengganu South; FT 10 Gemas; FT 10 Bahau; FT 10 Bandar Seri Jempol; FT 10 Triang	T-junctions
		Sungai Triang bridge		
		Jalan Palong 16-Tembangau	South; FT 1579 Jalan Palong 16-Tembangau; Tembangau	T-junctions
		Sungai Bera bridge		
		Sebertak	North; FT 1510 Jalan Bukit Kepayang; FELDA Bukit Kepayang	T-junctions
		Sebertak	Northeast; FT 1510 Jalan Bukit Kepayang; FELDA Rentam Southeast; FT 1572 Jalan Sebertak-Bera Selatan; Kota Iskandar; Kota Bahagia; Bandar Muadzam Shah; Kuantan; Bandar Tun Abdul Razak; Segamat; Tasik Bera	T-junctions

=== Jalan Bukit Kepayang side ===
Km	Exit	Junctions	To	Remarks
		Sebertak	FT 1510 Jalan Utama Bera West; Bandar Bera; Triang; Temerloh East; FT 1572 Jalan Sebertak-Bera Selatan; Kota Iskandar; Kota Bahagia; Bandar Muadzam Shah; Kuantan; Bandar Tun Abdul Razak; Segamat; Tasik Bera	T-junctions
		FELDA Bukit Kepayang		
		FELDA Rentam		
		Sebertak	West; FT 1510 Jalan Utama Bera; Bandar Bera; Triang; Temerloh Southeast; FT 1572 Jalan Sebertak-Bera Selatan; Kota Iskandar; Kota Bahagia; Bandar Muadzam Shah; Kuantan; Bandar Tun Abdul Razak; Segamat; Tasik Bera	T-junctions
