= Malaysia Federal Route 222 =

Road in Malaysia

Federal Route 222
- Tun Khalil Yaakob Highway; Lebuh Persiaran Tun Khalil Yaakob 敦卡里耶谷快速公路

Route information
- Part of AH142
- Maintained by Malaysian Public Works Department
- Length: 2.35 km (1.46 mi)
- Existed: 1995–present
- History: Completed in 1997

Major junctions
- North end: Gambang Interchange
- East Coast Expressway / AH141; FT 2 Federal Route 2 FT 2 Gambang-Kuantan Highway FT 12 / AH142 Tun Razak Highway
- South end: Gambang

Location
- Country: Malaysia
- Primary destinations: Bandar MEC, Universiti Malaysia Pahang (UMP), Pekan, Bandar Muadzam Shah, Segamat

Highway system
- Highways in Malaysia; Expressways; Federal; State

Tun Khalil Yaakob Highway (Malay: Lebuh Persiaran Tun Khalil Yaakob), formerly known as MEC Highway, Federal Route 222, Asian Highway Route AH 142, is a major highway in Pahang, Malaysia. "MEC" stands for the Malaysia Electric Corporation, the first electrical goods company in Malaysia which closed in 2004. The highway is part of the Asian Highway Network of route AH142.

The Kilometre Zero of the Federal Route 222 starts at Gambang junctions.

At most sections, the Federal Route 222 was built under the JKR R5 road standard, with a speed limit of 90 km/h.

== Junction lists ==
The entire route is located in Kuantan District, Pahang.

Legend:

- I/C - Interchange, I/S - Intersection, RSA - Rest and service area, OBR - Overhead bridge restaurant, R/R - Restaurant and rest plaza, L/B - Layby, V/P - Vista point, TN - tunnel, T/P - Toll plaza, BR - Bridge
- C - Cloverleaf, S - Stack, T-A - Trumpet-A, T-B - Trumpet-B, DT - Directional-T/Y, SDT - Semi-Directional-T/Y, P-Y - Partial-Y, D - Diamond, P-C - Partial cloverleaf, D-D - Diverging diamond, D-R - Direct ramp

km	Exit	Name	Destinations	Notes
7.0	I/C	Gambang-ECE I/C	East Coast Expressway / AH141 – Kuala Lumpur, Maran, Sri Jaya, Kuantan, Jabur, Kuala Terengganu	Trumpet interchange
	T/P	Gambang Toll Plaza	Touch 'n Go SmartTAG MyRFiD MyRFiD SmartTAG Touch 'n Go	
	BR	Sungai Belat bridge		
		Bandar MEC; Jalan Bandar Gambang 10	Jalan Bandar Gambang 10 – Sekolah Sukan Malaysia Pahang (SSMP), Akedemi Bola Sepak Negara Mokhtar Dahari (ABD)	Junctions
		Bandar MEC; Universiti Malaysia Pahang (UMP)	Universiti Malaysia Pahang (UMP)	Junctions
		Gambang Archway		
0.0	I/S	Gambang	FT 2 Gambang–Kuantan Highway – Gambang, Maran, Temerloh, Bukit Gambang Resort City, Kuantan, Kuala Terengganu, Sultan Haji Ahmad Shah Airport	Junctions
Through to FT 12 / AH142 Tun Razak Highway
