= Malaysia Federal Route 1572 =

Road in Malaysia

Federal Route 1572
- Jalan Sebertak-Bera Selatan

Route information
- Maintained by Malaysian Public Works Department

Major junctions
- West end: Sebertak
- FT 1510 Jalan Utama Bera; FT 2489 Jalan Kota Bahagia-Melati; FT 11 Bera Highway
- East end: FT 11 Bera Highway

Location
- Country: Malaysia
- Primary destinations: Bandar Bera; Kota Iskandar; Tasik Bera

Highway system
- Highways in Malaysia; Expressways; Federal; State

Jalan Sebertak-Bera Selatan, Federal Route 1572, is a federal road in Pahang, Malaysia. It is a main route to Kota Bahagia, Bandar Muadzam Shah and Tasik Bera. At most sections, the Federal Route 1572 was built under the JKR R5 road standard, with a speed limit of 90 km/h.

== List of junctions ==
Km	Exit	Junctions	To	Remarks
		Sebertak	Northeast; FT 1510 Jalan Utama Bera; FELDA Rentam West; FT 1510 Jalan Utama Bera; Bandar Bera; Triang; Temerloh	T-junctions
		Sungai Sebertak bridge		
		Tasik Bera	V	
Bera-Rompin district border
		Jalan Kota Bahagia-Melati	Northeast; FT 2489 Jalan Kota Bahagia-Melati; Melati; Kota Bahagia; Bandar Muadzam Shah; Kuantan	T-junctions
		Kota Iskandar		
		Bera Highway	FT 11 Bera Highway; Bandar Seri Jempol; Bahau; Gemas; Seremban; East; Bandar Tun Abdul Razak; Kuantan; Segamat	T-junctions
