= Jalan Kota Bahagia-Melati =

Road in Malaysia

Federal Route 2489
- Jalan Kota Bahagia-Melati

Route information
- Maintained by Malaysian Public Works Department

Major junctions
- East end: FT 12 Tun Razak Highway
- FT 12 Tun Razak Highway; FT 1572 Jalan Sebertak-Bera Selatan
- West end: FT 1572 Jalan Sebertak-Bera Selatan

Location
- Country: Malaysia
- Primary destinations: Kota Bahagia; Kota Iskandar; Melati

Highway system
- Highways in Malaysia; Expressways; Federal; State

Jalan Kota Bahagia-Melati, Federal Route 2489, is a federal road in Pahang, Malaysia. It is a main route to Bandar Muadzam Shah via Tun Razak Highway.

At most sections, the Federal Route 2489 was built under the JKR R5 road standard, with a speed limit of 90 km/h.

== List of junctions ==
Km	Exit	Junctions	To	Remarks
		Tun Razak Highway	FT 12 Tun Razak Highway; North; Kuantan; Gambang; Pekan; Bandar Muadzam Shah; East Coast Expressway Kuala Lumpur; East Coast Expressway Kuala Terengganu; South; Bandar Tun Abdul Razak; Segamat; Gemas; North–South Expressway Southern Route AH2 Johor Bahru	T-junctions
		Kota Bahagia		
		Kota Iskandar		
		Melati		
		Jalan Sebertak-Bera Selatan	FT 1572 Jalan Sebertak-Bera Selatan; Northwest; Sebertak; Bandar Bera; Temerloh; Tasik Bera; South; Bandar Tun Abdul Razak; Bandar Seri Jempol; Bahau; Seremban	T-junctions
