= Malaysia Federal Route 83 =

Road in Malaysia

Federal Route 83
- Jalan Bandar Pusat Jengka

Route information
- Maintained by Malaysian Public Works Department
- Length: 49.6 km (30.8 mi)

Major junctions
- North end: FT 64 Jalan Jerantut–Maran
- FT 64 Federal Route 64; FT 1533 Jalan Utama Jengka Utara-Barat; FT 62 Jalan Bandar Pusat Jengka Timur; FT 1534 Jalan Utama Jengka 8, 9, 12 dan 13 East Coast Expressway / AH141; FT 2 Federal Route 2
- South end: FT 2 Jalan Temerloh–Maran

Location
- Country: Malaysia
- Primary destinations: FELDA settlements, Bandar Pusat Jengka, Chenor

Highway system
- Highways in Malaysia; Expressways; Federal; State

Federal Route 83, or Jalan Bandar Pusat Jengka, is the main federal roads in Bandar Pusat Jengka, Pahang, Malaysia. There are many FELDA settlements along this road.

== Route background ==
The Kilometre Zero of the Federal Route 83 starts at Jalan Temerloh-Maran junctions, at its interchange with the Federal Route 2, the main trunk road of central Peninsular Malaysia.

== Features ==
At most sections, the Federal Route 83 was built under the JKR R5 road standard, allowing maximum speed limit of up to 90 km/h.

== Junction lists ==
The entire route is located in Pahang.

Legend:

- I/C - Interchange, I/S - Intersection, RSA - Rest and service area, OBR - Overhead bridge restaurant, R/R - Restaurant and rest plaza, L/B - Layby, V/P - Vista point, TN - tunnel, T/P - Toll plaza, BR - Bridge
- C - Cloverleaf, S - Stack, T-A - Trumpet-A, T-B - Trumpet-B, DT - Directional-T/Y, SDT - Semi-Directional-T/Y, P-Y - Partial-Y, D - Diamond, P-C - Partial cloverleaf, D-D - Diverging diamond, D-R - Direct ramp

District	Location	km	mi	Name	Destinations	Notes
Jerantut	Jerantut	49.6	30.8	Jalan Jerantut–Maran	FT 64 Jalan Jerantut–Maran – Jerantut, Benta, Kuala Lipis, Raub, Taman Negara, Sungai Siam, Maran	T-junctions
Jerantut–Maran district border				Sungai Siam bridge		
Maran	Jengka Triangle			FELDA Kesidang Jengka 8		
Maran	Jengka Triangle			Jengka North	FT 1533 Jalan Utama Jengka Utara-Barat – FELDA Jengka 9, FELDA Melor Jengka 12; FT 1546 Jalan Jengka 10 – FELDA Mawar Jengka 10	Junctions
Maran	Jengka Triangle			FELDA Melati Jengka 11	FT 1547 Jalan Jengka 11 – FELDA Melati Jengka 11	T-junctions
Maran	Jengka Triangle			Sungai Jengka bridge		
Maran	Jengka Triangle			Jalan Kampung Perak	Jalan Kampung Perak – FELDA Mawar Jengka 10, FELDA Anggerik Jengka 1	T-junctions
Maran	Jengka Triangle			Bandar Pusat Jengka	Taman Desa Jaya II, Taman Jaya	T-junctions
Maran	Jengka Triangle			Bandar Pusat Jengka	Lintasan Semarak – Universiti Teknologi MARA (UiTM) Bandar Pusat Jengka Campus	T-junctions
Maran	Jengka Triangle			Sungai Jengka bridge		
Maran	Jengka Triangle			Bandar Pusat Jengka	FT 1533 Jalan Utama Jengka Utara-Barat – FELDA Puteri Malu 13, FELDA Melor Jengka 12, FELDA Teratai Jengka 21, FELDA Terkis Jengka 22, FELDA Jengka 33	T-junctions
Maran	Jengka Triangle			Bandar Pusat Jengka	FT 62 Jalan Bandar Pusat Jengka Timur – Kampung Teriang, FELDA Jengka Timur, Maran	T-junctions
Maran	Jengka Triangle			FELDA Raya Jengka 14	FT 1549 Jalan Jengka 14 – FELDA Raya Jengka 14	T-junctions
Maran	Jengka Triangle			Sungai Jengka bridge		
Maran	Jengka Triangle			FELDA Semarak Jengka 15		
Maran	Jengka Triangle			FELDA Sena Jengka 16		
Maran	Jengka Triangle			FELDA Tanjung Jengka 20	FT 1550 Jalan Jengka 20 – FELDA Tanjung Jengka 20	T-junctions
Maran	Jengka Triangle			FELDA Seri Pagi Jengka 17		
Maran	Jengka Triangle			FELDA Seroja Jengka 18		
Maran	Jengka Triangle			Jengka South	FT 1534 Jalan Utama Jengka 8, 9, 12 dan 13 – FELDA Tonkin Jengka 23, Rantau Makmur, Batu Sawar, Gunung Senyum recreational park	T-junctions
Maran	Jengka Triangle			FELDA Siantan Jengka 19		
Maran	Jengka Triangle			Chenor-ECE	East Coast Expressway / AH141 – Kuala Lumpur, Lanchang, Temerloh, Maran, Kuantan, Kuala Terengganu	T-junctions
Maran	Jengka Triangle			Jalan FELDA Kampung Awah	FT 1527 Jalan FELDA Kampung Awah – FELDA Kampung Awah	T-junctions
Maran	Jengka Triangle			Sungai Jengka bridge		
Maran	Jengka Triangle			Kampung Awah		
Temerloh	Temerloh	0.0	0.0	Jalan Temerloh–Maran	FT 2 Jalan Temerloh–Maran – Kuala Lumpur, Mentakab, Temerloh, Chenor, Maran, Kuantan	T-junctions
1.000 mi = 1.609 km; 1.000 km = 0.621 mi
