= Jalan FELDA New Zealand =

Road in Malaysia

Federal Route 1485
- Jalan FELDA New Zealand

Route information
- Maintained by Malaysian Public Works Department

Major junctions
- South end: FT 2 Jalan Maran
- FT 2 Federal route 2
- North end: FELDA New Zealand

Location
- Country: Malaysia

Highway system
- Highways in Malaysia; Expressways; Federal; State

Jalan FELDA New Zealand, Federal Route 1485, is a federal road in Pahang, Malaysia.

At most sections, the Federal Route 1485 was built under the JKR R5 road standard, with a speed limit of 90 km/h.

== List of junctions and towns ==
km	Exit	Junctions	To	Remarks
		Jalan Maran	West; FT 2 Maran; FT 2 Temerloh East; FT 2 Gambang; FT 2 Kuantan; East Coast Expressway East Coast Expressway; Kuala Lumpur; Kuala Terengganu	Junctions
		FELDA New Zealand; Welcome arch		
		FELDA New Zealand		
