= Malaysia Federal Route 2484 =

Road in Malaysia

Federal Route 2484
- Jalan Bandar Chini

Route information
- Maintained by Malaysian Public Works Department

Major junctions
- East end: Tun Razak Highway
- FT 12 / AH142 Tun Razak Highway; C108 Jalan Mengkarak–Paluh Hinai
- West end: Bandar Chini

Location
- Country: Malaysia
- Primary destinations: Lake Chini

Highway system
- Highways in Malaysia; Expressways; Federal; State

Jalan Bandar Chini, Federal Route 2484, is a federal road in Pahang, Malaysia.

At most sections, the Federal Route 2484 was built under the JKR R5 road standard, allowing maximum speed limit of up to 90 km/h.

== Junction lists ==
The entire route is located in Pekan District, Pahang.

Location	km	mi	Name	Destinations	Notes
Bandar Chini			Tun Razak Highway	FT 12 / AH142 Tun Razak Highway – Gambang, Kuantan, Pekan, Bandar Muadzam Shah, Bandar Tun Abdul Razak, Rompin, Segamat, Johor Bahru East Coast Expressway / AH141 – Kuala Lumpur, Kuala Terengganu	T-junctions
Bandar Chini			Bandar Satu Paloh Hinai		
Bandar Chini			Bandar Chini	Taman Nirwana	
Bandar Chini			Bandar Chini	FELDA Chini, Lake Chini	T-junctions
Bandar Chini			Bandar Chini	C108 Jalan Mengkarak–Paluh Hinai – Bera, Chenor, Pekan	T-junctions
1.000 mi = 1.609 km; 1.000 km = 0.621 mi
