= Jalan Jengka 10 =

Road in Malaysia

Federal Route 1546
- Jalan Jengka 10

Route information
- Maintained by Malaysian Public Works Department

Major junctions
- West end: Jengka Utara
- FT 1533 Jalan Utama Jengka Utara-Barat; FT 83 Jalan Bandar Pusat Jengka; Jalan Sungai Tekam; Jalan Kampung Perak
- East end: FELDA Mawar Jengka 10

Location
- Country: Malaysia

Highway system
- Highways in Malaysia; Expressways; Federal; State

Jalan Jengka 10, Federal Route 1546, is the main federal road in Bandar Pusat Jengka, Pahang, Malaysia.

At most sections, the Federal Route 1546 was built under the JKR R5 road standard, allowing maximum speed limit of up to 90 km/h.

== List of junctions and towns ==
km	Exit	Junctions	To	Remarks
		Jengka Utara	West; FT 1533 Jalan Utama Jengka Utara-Barat; FELDA Jengka 9 FELDA Melor Jengka 12 FT 83 Jalan Bandar Pusat Jengka; North; Jerantut; Benta; Taman Negara; South; Bandar Pusat Jengka; Temerloh; Maran; East Coast Expressway East Coast Expressway; Kuala Lumpur; Kuala Terengganu; Kuantan	Junctions
		FELDA Mawar Jengka 10; Welcome arch		
		Jalan Sungai Tekam	North; Jalan Sungai Tekam; FELDA Sungai Tekam; Tekam Plantations Resort	T-junctions
		FELDA Mawar Jengka 10		
		Jalan Kampung Perak	Jalan Kampung Perak; North; FELDA Anggerik Jengka 1 South; Bandar Pusat Jengka	T-junctions
