= Jalan Utama Jengka 8, 9, 12 dan 13 =

Road in Malaysia

Federal Route 1534
- Jalan Utama Jengka 8, 9, 12 dan 13

Route information
- Maintained by Malaysian Public Works Department

Major junctions
- From: FT 1533 Jalan Utama Jengka Utara-Barat
- FT 1533 Jalan Utama Jengka Utara-Barat; C123 Jalan Kampung Seberang; FT 83 Jalan Bandar Pusat Jengka
- To: FT 83 Jalan Bandar Pusat Jengka

Location
- Country: Malaysia
- Primary destinations: FELDA Puteri Malu Jengka 13; FELDA Teratai Jengka 21; Batu Sawar; FELDA Terkis Jengka 22; FELDA Jengka 23

Highway system
- Highways in Malaysia; Expressways; Federal; State

Jalan Utama Jengka 8, 9, 12 dan 13, Federal Route 1534, is the main federal roads in Bandar Pusat Jengka, Pahang, Malaysia.

At most sections, the Federal Route 1534 was built under the JKR R5 road standard, allowing maximum speed limit of up to 90 km/h.

== List of junctions ==
=== Main road (north-south) ===
km	Exit	Junctions	To	Remarks
		Jalan Utama Jengka Utara-Barat	FT 1533 Jalan Utama Jengka Utara-Barat; Northwest; FELDA Jengka 9, 12; East; Bandar Pusat Jengka	T-junctions
		FELDA Puteri Malu Jengka 13	South; FT 1548 Jalan Jengka 13 13; FELDA Puteri Malu Jengka 13	T-junctions
				T-junctions
		FELDA Teratai Jengka 21		
		FELDA Terkis Jengka 22	East; FT 1551 Jalan Jengka 22; FELDA Terkis Jengka 22	T-junctions
		Jengka Barat	West; FT 1534 Jalan Batu Sawar-Jengka; Batu Sawar; Rantau Makmur; Temerloh; Gunung Senyum recreational park	T-junctions
		FELDA Tonkin Jengka 23		
		Sungai Jengka bridge		
		Sungai Lokek bridge		
		Jalan Bandar Pusat Jengka	FT 83 Jalan Bandar Pusat Jengka; North; Bandar Pusat Jengka; South; Temerloh; Maran; East Coast Expressway East Coast Expressway; Kuala Lumpur; Kuala Terengganu; Kuantan	T-junctions

=== Batu Sawar - Jengka Barat (west-east) ===
km	Exit	Junctions	To	Remarks
		Batu Sawar	C123 Jalan Kampung Seberang; North; Rantau Makmur; Gunung Senyum recreational park South; Kampung Seberang; Temerloh	T-junctions
Jengka Triangle
Sungai Siam bridge Jengka Triangle-Maran sub-district border
		Jengka Barat	FT 1535 Jalan Utama Jengka 8, 9, 12 Dan 13; North; FELDA Jengka 13, 21, 22; South; Bandar Pusat Jengka; Maran; East Coast Expressway East Coast Expressway; Kuala Lumpur; Kuala Terengganu; Kuantan	T-junctions
