= Kuala Rompin =

- Town and district capital
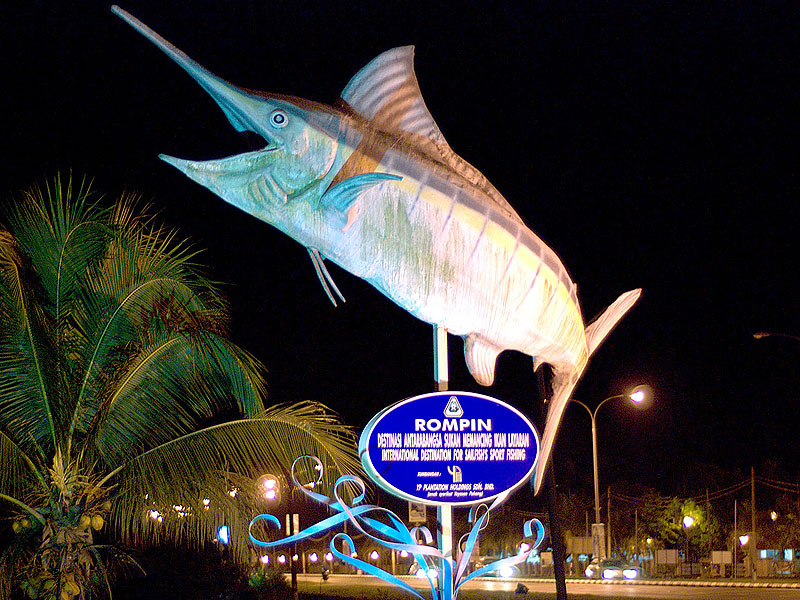
- Marlin statue in Rompin
- Interactive map of Kuala Rompin
- Coordinates: 2°49′N 103°29′E
- Country: Malaysia
- State: Pahang
- District: Rompin District
- Established: 1888

Government
  - Body: Rompin District Council
  - President: Zulkifli Hashim
- Postcode: 268xx
- Telephone area code: +60-09
- Vehicle registration: C

Kuala Rompin is the district capital of Rompin District, southeastern Pahang, Malaysia, and the district's largest town. It is located on the south-east coast of Peninsular Malaysia and faces the South China Sea. It is about 133 km (83 mi) south from Kuantan, the state capital of Pahang. From Singapore, travellers must travel 215 km (134 mi) north by the coastal road via the city of Johor Bahru and the town of Mersing. From the Malaysian capital of Kuala Lumpur, Kuala Rompin is located east and is about 3½ hours journey by road.

== History ==
It was said at one time in this area there is a tree named Ru, or Rhu (Casuarina equisetifolia). Ru trees are unique compared with other casuarina trees that live here because of its cascading shape. One story tells of rhu trees having a circumference that can fit as many as 40 people dining together. At first, people call this place name as Rhu Ramping, and eventually Rumpin and Rompin.

In colonial days, Kuala Rompin was a fishing village that is often visited by traders who commute between Singapore and Kuantan. In 1952 the Pahang state government made Rompin an autonomous sub-district under Pekan.

An Administrative Officer was subsequently appointed, taking the post of Assistant District Officer, to be stationed in the autonomous subdistrict; British officer, J.B. Melford was appointed to that post on 16 December 1952.

On July 31, 1976, the Sultan of Pahang, His Majesty Sultan Haji Ahmad Shah Al Musta'in Billah upgraded Rompin into a full district, hence separating it from Pekan and making Rompin the ninth district of Pahang. Rompin was given one vote in the parliament one decade later.

Today, Rompin District is divided into five mukims (communes), namely Tioman, Endau, Pontian, Keratong and Kuala Rompin town.

== Attractions ==
Kuala Rompin is probably best known as the gateway to Tioman Island. However, it is not without its own attractions. The restaurants of Kuala Rompin are famous for their seafood, especially for their freshwater prawns and freshwater clam caught in the surrounding areas especially at the estuary of the Rompin River. Crabs and squids are also popular.

Kuala Rompin is also building a name for itself in the sport of sailfish fishing. It is widely recognized as the Sailfish Capital of Asia, and hosts a yearly world-class fishing event, the Royal Pahang International Billfish Challenge. Kuala Rompin is considered to be one of the best places in the world to catch sailfish.

== Politics ==
The town of Kuala Rompin is situated in the State electoral constituency of Tioman, which was won by YB Mohd. Johari from Barisan Nasional. Its representative to the Malaysian Parliament is Datuk Hasan Arifin, also from Barisan Nasional.

== Climate ==
Kuala Rompin has a tropical rainforest climate (Af) with heavy rainfall year-round.

Climate data for Kuala Rompin
Month	Jan	Feb	Mar	Apr	May	Jun	Jul	Aug	Sep	Oct	Nov	Dec	Year
Mean daily maximum °C (°F)	29.2 (84.6)	30.1 (86.2)	31.2 (88.2)	32.3 (90.1)	32.4 (90.3)	31.9 (89.4)	31.5 (88.7)	31.5 (88.7)	31.4 (88.5)	31.4 (88.5)	30.3 (86.5)	29.1 (84.4)	31.0 (87.8)
Daily mean °C (°F)	25.8 (78.4)	26.3 (79.3)	26.8 (80.2)	27.5 (81.5)	27.5 (81.5)	27.1 (80.8)	26.8 (80.2)	26.8 (80.2)	26.7 (80.1)	26.8 (80.2)	26.3 (79.3)	25.7 (78.3)	26.7 (80.0)
Mean daily minimum °C (°F)	22.4 (72.3)	22.6 (72.7)	22.5 (72.5)	22.7 (72.9)	22.7 (72.9)	22.4 (72.3)	22.1 (71.8)	22.1 (71.8)	22.0 (71.6)	22.2 (72.0)	22.3 (72.1)	22.4 (72.3)	22.4 (72.3)
Average rainfall mm (inches)	419 (16.5)	243 (9.6)	217 (8.5)	163 (6.4)	149 (5.9)	130 (5.1)	140 (5.5)	127 (5.0)	168 (6.6)	215 (8.5)	377 (14.8)	620 (24.4)	2,968 (116.8)
Source: Climate-Data.org
