= Jalan Kota Perdana =

Road in Malaysia

Federal Route 2486
- Jalan Kota Perdana

Major junctions
- West end: FT 12 Tun Razak Highway
- FT 12 Tun Razak Highway
- East end: Kota Perdana

Location
- Country: Malaysia

Highway system
- Highways in Malaysia; Expressways; Federal; State

Jalan Kota Perdana, Federal Route 2486, is a federal road in Pahang, Malaysia.

At most sections, the Federal Route 2486 was built under the JKR R5 road standard, allowing maximum speed limit of up to 90 km/h.

== List of junctions ==
km	Exit	Junctions	To	Remarks
		Tun Razak Highway	FT 12 Tun Razak Highway; North; Gambang; Kuantan; Pekan; East Coast Expressway East Coast Expressway; Kuala Lumpur; Kuala Terengganu South; Bandar Muadzam Shah; Rompin; Bandar Tun Abdul Razak; Segamat	T-junctions
		Kota Perdana; Welcome arch		
		Kota Perdana		
