= FELDA New Zealand =

Coordinates: 3.6497387°N 102.8307859°E

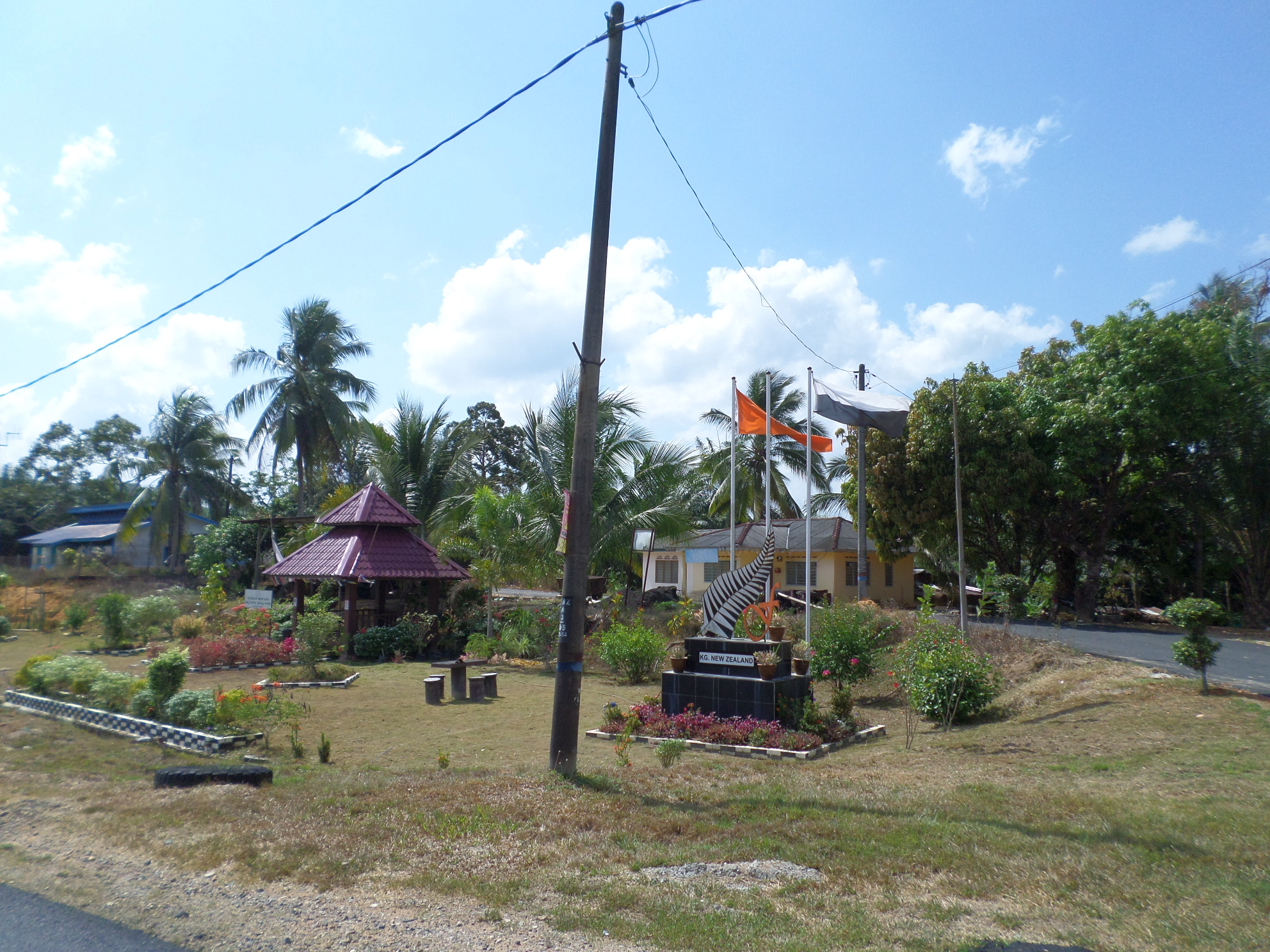
FELDA New Zealand.

FELDA New Zealand or Kampung New Zealand is a FELDA settlement in Maran District, Pahang, Malaysia. The settlement was named after New Zealand.

== Name Origin ==
According to the oral stories of the Marans and the settlers of the New Zealand villages themselves, the village, when it was made into a land scheme, received assistance from the New Zealand government. The contribution of the opening of land plans was channelled through the New Zealand embassy in Kuala Lumpur. More than that, the earliest surveyors for the Felda land opening plan also came from New Zealand. It is on this basis of donations and assistance that this village is called Kampung New Zealand. However, another version of the story says that the village was opened by a Māori from New Zealand. However, this second statement cannot be accurately verified, as there is no record of the mass occupation of the Māori population in the New Zealand village from the past to the present.
