= Bukit Ibam =

Town in Rompin District Pahang, Malaysia

Coordinates: 3°10′N 102°59′E

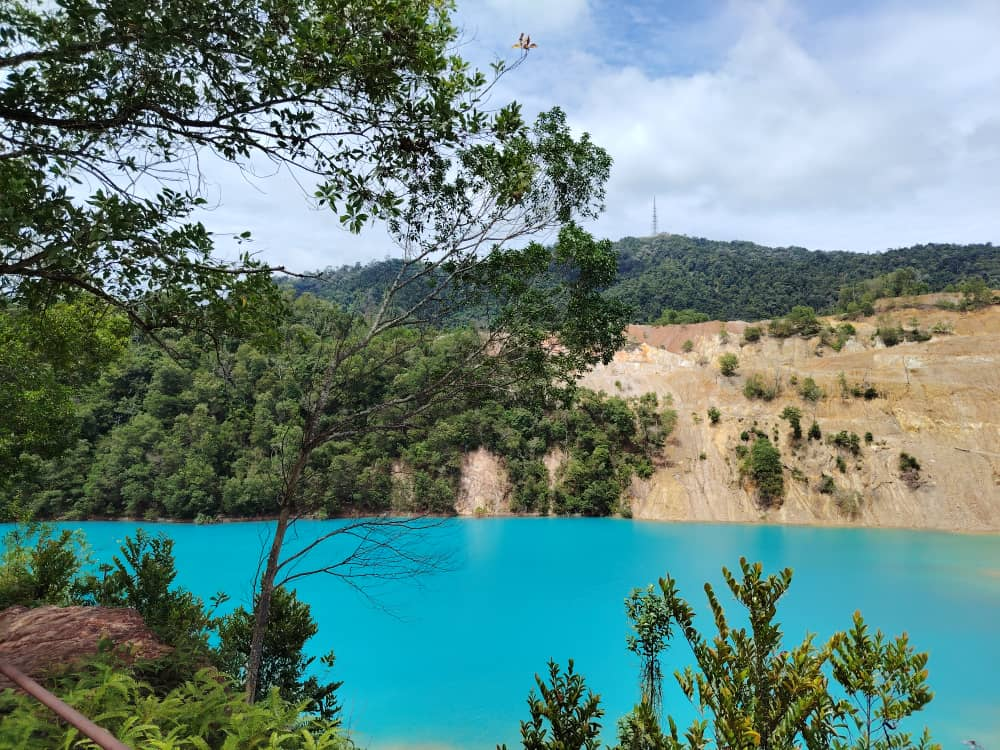
Blue Lake of the Bukit Ibam

Bukit Ibam is a small town in Rompin District, Pahang, Malaysia. It is an important place for the iron ore mining activities in the past time. The iron ore mining in Bukit Ibam was started after the country achieved independence. At that time, Bukit Ibam is one of the largest iron ore producers in Asia. The Blue Lake or known as Tasik Biru by local residents is one of the effect of the mining activities in Bukit Ibam. Nowadays, Bukit Ibam is known for their Blue Lake and tourists visit this place for the views of the lake.
