= Jalan Jengka 11 =

Road in Malaysia

Federal Route 1547
- Jalan Jengka 11

Route information
- Maintained by Malaysian Public Works Department

Major junctions
- East end: FT 83 Jalan Bandar Pusat Jengka
- FT 83 Jalan Bandar Pusat Jengka
- West end: FELDA Melati Jengka 11

Location
- Country: Malaysia

Highway system
- Highways in Malaysia; Expressways; Federal; State

Jalan Jengka 21, Federal Route 1547, is a main federal road in Bandar Pusat Jengka, Pahang, Malaysia.

At most sections, the Federal Route 1547 was built under the JKR R5 road standard, with a speed limit of 90 km/h.

== List of junctions ==
km	Exit	Junctions	To	Remarks
		Jalan Bandar Pusat Jengka	FT 83 Jalan Bandar Pusat Jengka; North; Jerantut; Benta; Taman Negara; South; Bandar Pusat Jengka; Temerloh; Maran; East Coast Expressway East Coast Expressway; Kuala Lumpur; Kuala Terengganu; Kuantan	T-junctions
		FELDA Melati Jengka 11; Welcome arch		
		FELDA Melati Jengka 11		
