= Malaysia Federal Route 1579 =

Road in Malaysia

Federal Route 1579
- Jalan Palong 16-Tembangau

Major junctions
- North end: Jalan Utama Bera
- FT 1510 Jalan Utama Bera; FT 11 Bera Highway
- South end: Bera Highway

Location
- Country: Malaysia
- Primary destinations: FELDA Tembangau

Highway system
- Highways in Malaysia; Expressways; Federal; State

Jalan Palong 16-Tembangau, Federal Route 1579, is a federal road in Pahang and Negeri Sembilan state, Malaysia.

At most sections, the Federal Route 1579 was built under the JKR R5 road standard, with a speed limit of 90 km/h.

== List of junctions ==
Legend:

- I/C - interchange, I/S - intersection, RSA - Rest and service area, OBR - overhead bridge restaurant, L/B - layby, V/P - vista point, TN - tunnel, T/P - toll plaza, BR - bridge

States	District	Km	Exit	Junctions	Destination	Remarks
Pahang	Bera			Jalan Utama Bera	FT 1510 Jalan Utama Bera – Bandar Bera, Teriang, Temerloh, Kuantan, Sebertak, FELDA Rentam, Kota Bahagia, Bandar Muadzam Shah, Tasik Bera	T-junctions
Pahang	Bera			FELDA Teriang 2		
Pahang	Bera			FELDA Teriang 1		
Pahang	Bera			FELDA Ladang Teriang Selatan		
Pahang	Bera			FELDA Tembangau		
Pahang	Bera			FELDA Kampung Tembangau		
Negeri Sembilan	Jempol			Bera Highway	FT 10 Bera Highway – Bandar Seri Jempol, Bahau, Gemas, Seremban, Kota Shahbandar, Bandar Tun Abdul Razak, Kuantan, Segamat	T-junctions
