= Jalan Jengka 20 =

Road in Malaysia

Federal Route 1550
- Jalan Jengka 20

Route information
- Maintained by Malaysian Public Works Department

Major junctions
- East end: FT 83 Jalan Bandar Pusat Jengka
- FT 83 Jalan Bandar Pusat Jengka
- West end: FELDA Tanjung Jengka 20

Location
- Country: Malaysia

Highway system
- Highways in Malaysia; Expressways; Federal; State

Jalan Jengka 20, Federal Route 1550, is a main federal road in Bandar Pusat Jengka, Pahang, Malaysia.

At most sections, the Federal Route 1550 was built under the JKR R5 road standard, with a speed limit of 90 km/h.

== List of junctions ==
km	Exit	Junctions	To	Remarks
		Jalan Bandar Pusat Jengka	FT 83 Jalan Bandar Pusat Jengka; North; Bandar Pusat Jengka; South; Temerloh; Maran; East Coast Expressway; Kuala Lumpur; Kuala Terengganu; Kuantan	T-junctions
		FELDA Tanjung Jengka 20; Welcome arch		
		FELDA Tanjung Jengka 20		
