= Jalan FELDA Kampung Awah =

Road in Malaysia

Federal Route 1527
- Jalan FELDA Kampung Awah

Route information
- Maintained by Malaysian Public Works Department

Major junctions
- East end: FT 83 Jalan Bandar Pusat Jengka
- FT 83 Jalan Bandar Pusat Jengka; FT 1528 Jalan FELDA Kampung Awah (kilang getah)
- West end: FELDA Kampung Awah

Location
- Country: Malaysia

Highway system
- Highways in Malaysia; Expressways; Federal; State

Jalan FELDA Kampung Awah, Federal Route 1527, is a main federal road in Bandar Pusat Jengka, Pahang, Malaysia.

At most sections, the Federal Route 1527 was built under the JKR R5 road standard, with a speed limit of 90 km/h.

== List of junctions ==
km	Exit	Junctions	To	Remarks
		Jalan Bandar Pusat Jengka	FT 83 Jalan Bandar Pusat Jengka; North; Bandar Pusat Jengka; East Coast Expressway East Coast Expressway; Kuala Lumpur; Kuala Terengganu; Kuantan South; Temerloh; Maran	T-junctions
		Jalan FELDA Kampung Awah (kilang getah)	FT 1528 Jalan FELDA Kampung Awah (kilang getah)	T-junctions
		FELDA Kampung Awah; Welcome arch		
		FELDA Kampung Awah		
