= Jalan Jengka 14 =

Road in Malaysia

Federal Route 1549
- Jalan Jengka 14

Route information
- Maintained by Malaysian Public Works Department

Major junctions
- East end: FT 83 Jalan Bandar Pusat Jengka
- FT 83 Jalan Bandar Pusat Jengka
- West end: FELDA Raya Jengka 14

Location
- Country: Malaysia

Highway system
- Highways in Malaysia; Expressways; Federal; State

Jalan Jengka 14, Federal Route 1549, is a main federal road in Bandar Pusat Jengka, Pahang, Malaysia.

At most sections, the Federal Route 1549 was built under the JKR R5 road standard, with a speed limit of 90 km/h.

== List of junctions ==
km	Exit	Junctions	To	Remarks
		Jalan Bandar Pusat Jengka	FT 83 Jalan Bandar Pusat Jengka; North; Bandar Pusat Jengka; South; Temerloh; Maran; East Coast Expressway East Coast Expressway; Kuala Lumpur; Kuala Terengganu; Kuantan	T-junctions
		FELDA Raya Jengka 14; Welcome arch		
		FELDA Raya Jengka 14		
