= Universiti Tenaga Nasional =

Private university in Malaysia

Coordinates: 2°58′38″N 101°43′52″E

The Energy University
- Universiti Tenaga Nasional
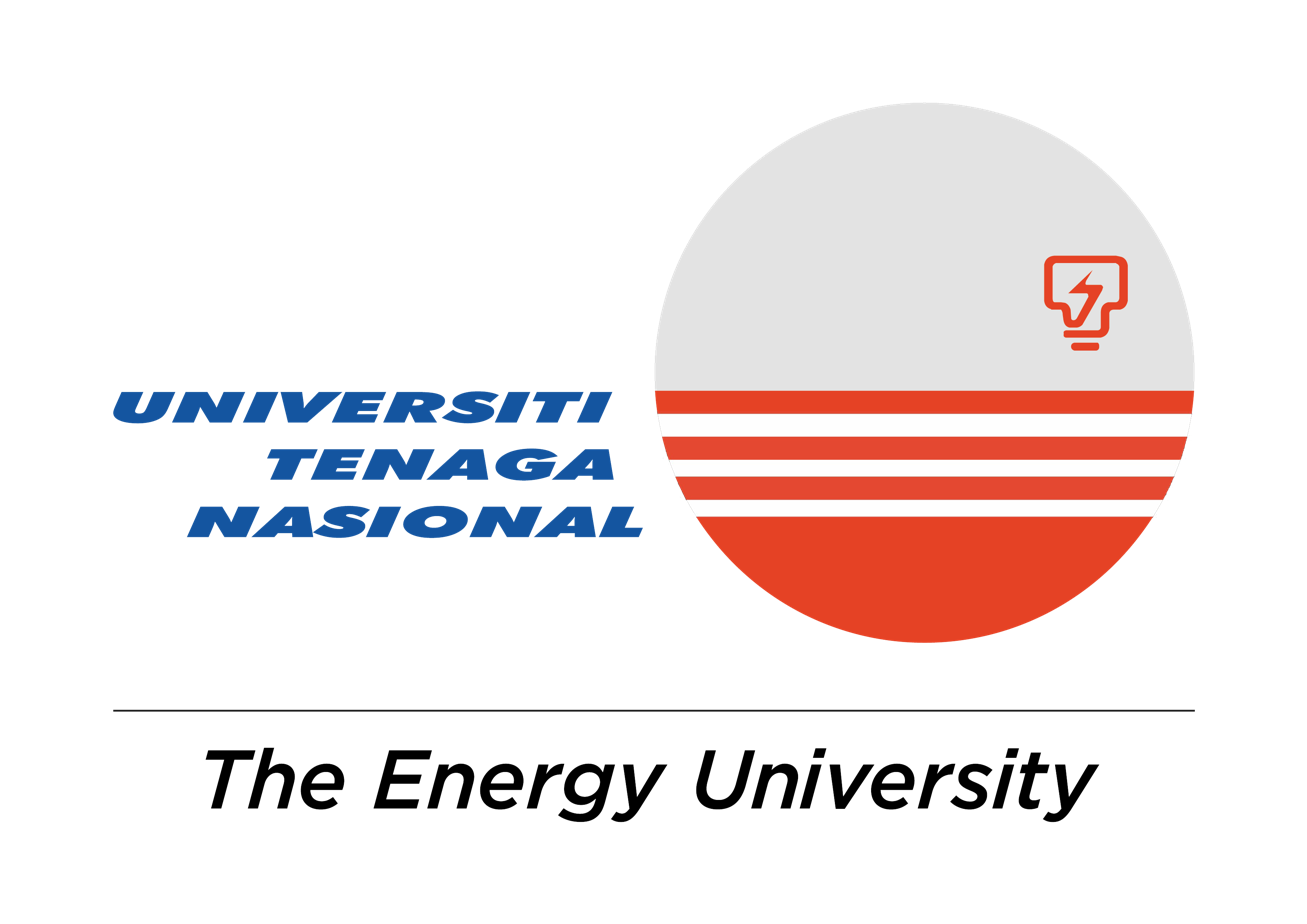
- Former names: Institut Latihan Sultan Ahmad Shah (1976); Institut Kejuruteraan Teknologi Tenaga Nasional (1994)
- Motto: The Energy University
- Type: Private (GLU status)
- Established: June 1, 1997; 29 years ago
- Accreditation: Malaysian Qualifications Agency
- Affiliations: IMechE; ASAIHL; ACU
- Chairman: Hasan bin Arifin
- Chancellor: Ramli Ngah Talib
- Vice-Chancellor: Prof. Ir. Dr. Khairul Salleh Bin Mohamed Sahari
- Dean: Prof. Ir. Ts. Dr. Miszaina Binti Osman (COE); Assoc. Prof. Dr. Amanuddin Shamsuddin (COBA); Prof. Dr. Zainuddin bin Hassan (CCI); Assoc. Prof. Dr. Rosmiza Mokhtar (CCed); Prof. Dato' Ir. Dr. Norashidah Md. Din (COGS)
- Students: 5000
- Location: Kajang, Selangor, Malaysia
- Campus: Urban
- Language: English, Bahasa Melayu
- Colours: Red, White and Silver
- Nickname: UNITEN
- Website: www.uniten.edu.my
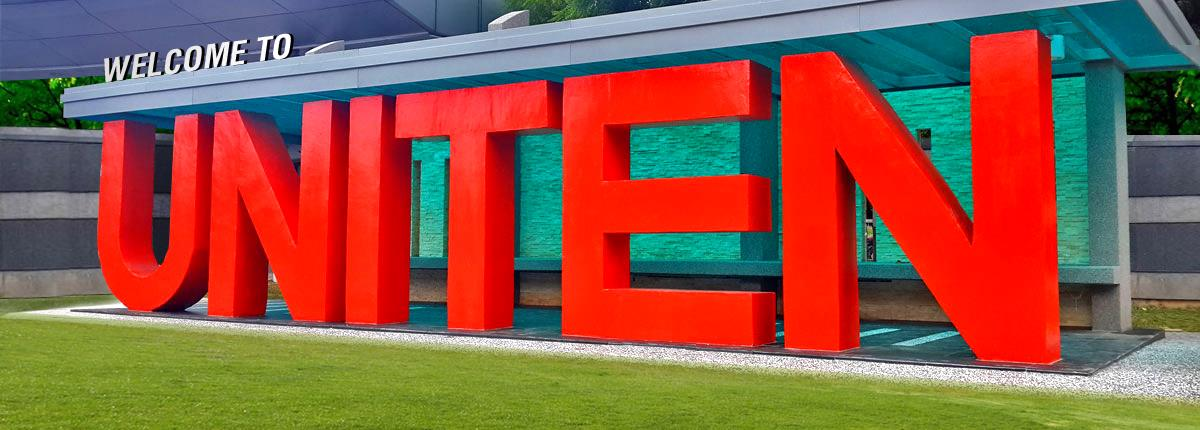

Universiti Tenaga Nasional (English: The National Energy University; UNITEN) is a private university, located in Selangor, Malaysia, with GLC university status. It is wholly owned by the public-listed Tenaga Nasional Berhad (TNB), established in 1997.

== History ==
Universiti Tenaga Nasional commenced operation in 1976 as Institut Latihan Sultan Ahmad Shah (ILSAS), which served for many years as the corporate training center for Tenaga Nasional Berhad (TNB) and its predecessor, the National Electricity Board. In 1994, ILSAS was transformed into an institute of higher learning and renamed Institut Kejuruteraan Teknologi Tenaga Nasional (IKATAN). It offered academic programmes in engineering and business management at undergraduate and graduate levels through twinning links with local and foreign universities (Indiana-University, Purdue University Indianapolis, US for Engineering). In 1997, IKATAN was upgraded to Universiti Tenaga Nasional.

== Principal Officers ==
The Chancellor of Universiti Tenaga Nasional, Tun Abdul Rahman Abbas, was appointed on 9 March 2005.

Tan Sri Dr. Leo Moggie serves as Chairman of Tenaga Nasional Berhad and Sabah Electricity Sdn Bhd, two major electricity providers in Malaysia. He was appointed to the Board of the NSTP Company on 27 February 2008 and also sits on the Board of Directors of Digi.Com Berhad.

== Campuses ==
Universiti Tenaga Nasional operates from two campuses; one is the main campus in Putrajaya, and the other is in Bandar Muadzam Shah.

=== Putrajaya (main campus) ===
This campus is 25 miles to the south of Kuala Lumpur near Kajang in Selangor, and has an area of 214 hectares. It is near the Cyberjaya Multimedia Super Corridor and adjacent to Putrajaya, the administrative center of the Federal Government of Malaysia. All engineering, information technology and other technology courses are held at this campus.

=== Sultan Haji Ahmad Shah (branch campus) ===
This branch is located at Bandar Muadzam Shah, Pahang. Officially opened on the 4th of May 2001 the campus offers Accounting, Finance, Entrepreneurship, Marketing, Human Resources, and Business courses.

== Notable alumni ==
Nurul Izzah Anwar - Former Member of Parliament for Lembah Pantai and Permatang Pauh and Deputy President of People's Justice Party.

== Rankings ==
University rankings

Global – Overall
- QS World"World University Rankings 2026". QS World University Rankings.: =551 (2026)
- THE World: 801-1000 (2025)

=== Quacquarelli Symonds (QS) ===
Year	Rank	Valuer
2012	251-300	QS Asian University Rankings
2013	201-250	QS Asian University Rankings
2014	251-300	QS Asian University Rankings
2015	251-300	QS Asian University Rankings
2016	251-300	QS Asian University Rankings
2017	251-300	QS Asian University Rankings
2017	371	QS WUR By Subject Ranking - Engineering and Technology
2018	243	QS Asian University Rankings
2018	255	QS WUR By Subject Ranking - Engineering and Technology
2018	251-300	QS WUR By Subject Ranking - Engineering (Electrical and Electronic)
2018	351-400	QS WUR By Subject Ranking - Engineering (Mechanical)
2019	701-750	QS World University Ranking
2019	101-150	QS Top 50 Under 50 Rankings
2020	801-1000	QS World University Ranking
2021	701-750	QS World University Ranking
2022	751-800	QS World University Ranking
2023	701-750	QS World University Ranking
2024	761-770	QS World University Ranking
2024	164	QS Asian University Rankings
2024	711-720	QS World University Rankings - Sustainability
2024	501-550	QS WUR By Subject Ranking - Engineering and Technology
2024	301-350	QS WUR By Subject Ranking - Engineering (Electrical and Electronic)
2024	701-720	QS WUR By Subject Ranking - Computer Science & Information Systems
2025	641-650	QS World University Ranking
2026	551	QS World University Ranking

=== Times Higher Education (THE) ===
Year	Rank	Valuer
2018	801-1000	THE World University Rankings
2021	801-1000	THE World University Rankings
2022	801-1000	THE World University Rankings
2023	801-1000	THE World University Rankings
2023	251-300	THE World University Rankings:Young University Ranking
2024	601-800	THE World University Rankings
2024	198	THE World University Rankings: Young University Ranking
2025	601-800	THE World University Rankings

== See also ==
- List of universities in Malaysia
