= FELDA Sebertak =

Town in Bera District, Malaysia

Coordinates: 3.2695833°N 102.6087778°E

FELDA Sebertak فيلدا سبرتق
- FELDA Colonial Town
- Interactive map of FELDA Sebertak
- Country: Malaysia
- State: Pahang
- District: Bera
- Mukim: Mukim Bera
- Parliamentary constituency: Bera
- State Assembly constituency: Kemayan

Sebertak is a small town in Bera District, Pahang, Malaysia.
