= Kota Shahbandar =

Town in Rompin District, Pahang, Malaysia

Coordinates: 2°53′N 102°45′E

Kota Shahbandar is a small town in Rompin District, Pahang, Malaysia, and Malaysia Federal Route 11 passes through the town (Department of Statistics Malaysia, 2023).
