= AH142 =

Road in Asia

Asian Highway 142

Route information
- Length: 200 km (120 mi)

Major junctions
- North end: Gambang, Pahang
- South end: Yong Peng, Johor

Location
- Countries: Malaysia

Highway system
- Asian Highway Network
← AH141	→ AH143

Asian Highway 142, AH142 is a highway that is part of Asian Highway Network. It was never signposted in Malaysia, although it is part of Asian Highway Network. It goes along the MEC Highway (Malaysian Federal Route 222), Tun Razak Highway (Malaysian Federal Route 12), and Federal Route 1.
