= Gambang, Pahang =

Gambang
- Town
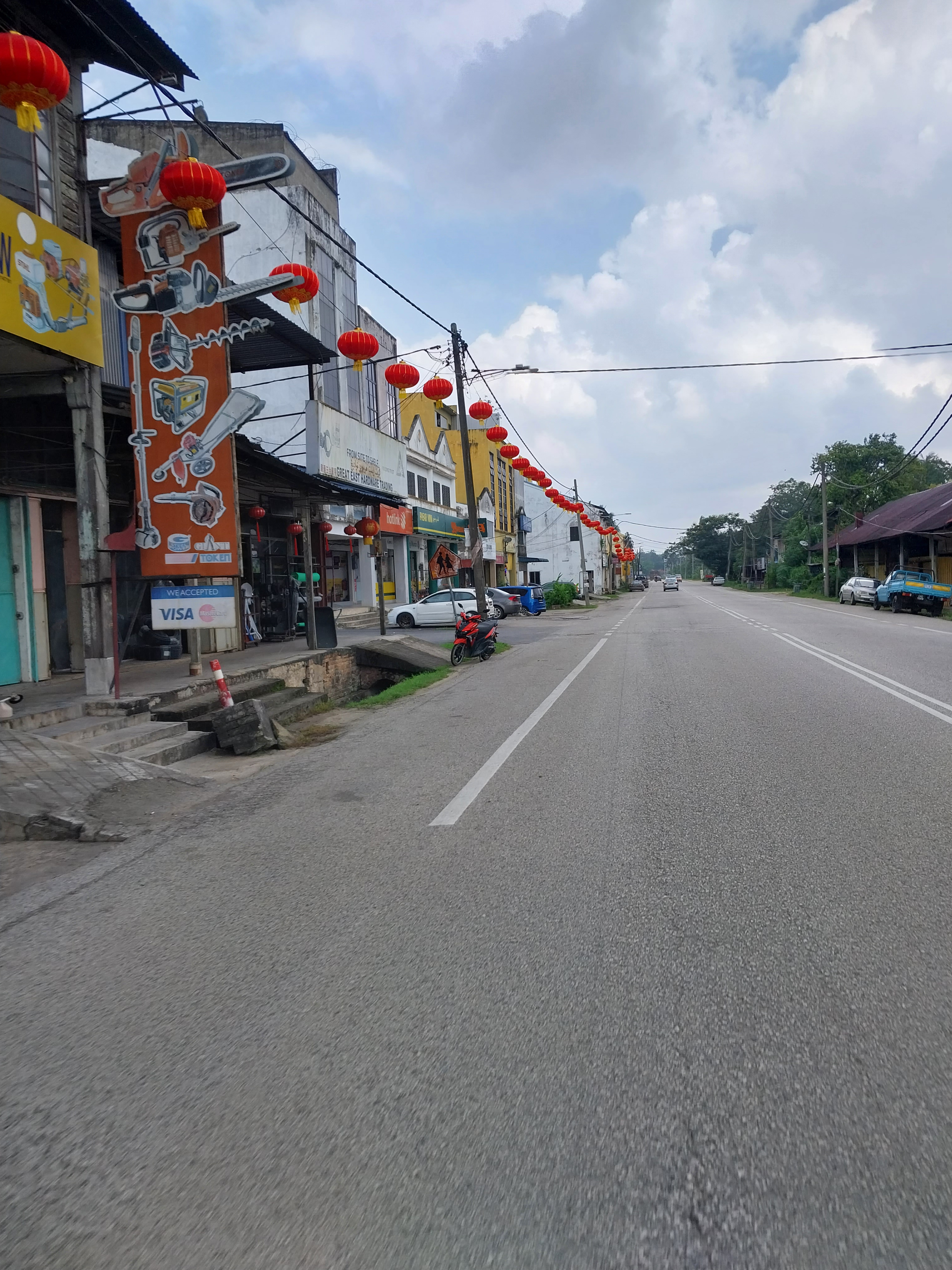
- Gambang town

- Gambang in Pahang Gambang (Peninsular Malaysia) Gambang (Malaysia)
- Coordinates: 3°43′0″N 103°6′0″E
- Country: Malaysia
- State: Pahang
- District: Kuantan
- Time zone: UTC+8 (MYT)

Gambang is a town in Kuantan District, Pahang, Malaysia. It is located at a junction between Federal Route 2, MEC Highway (Federal Route 222) and Tun Razak Highway (Federal Route 12). The Malaysia Electric Corporation (MEC) town (Bandar MEC) and electrical appliances manufacturing factory is located here. It is accessible via the Gambang Interchange of the East Coast Expressway (ECE) East Coast Expressway.

== Education ==
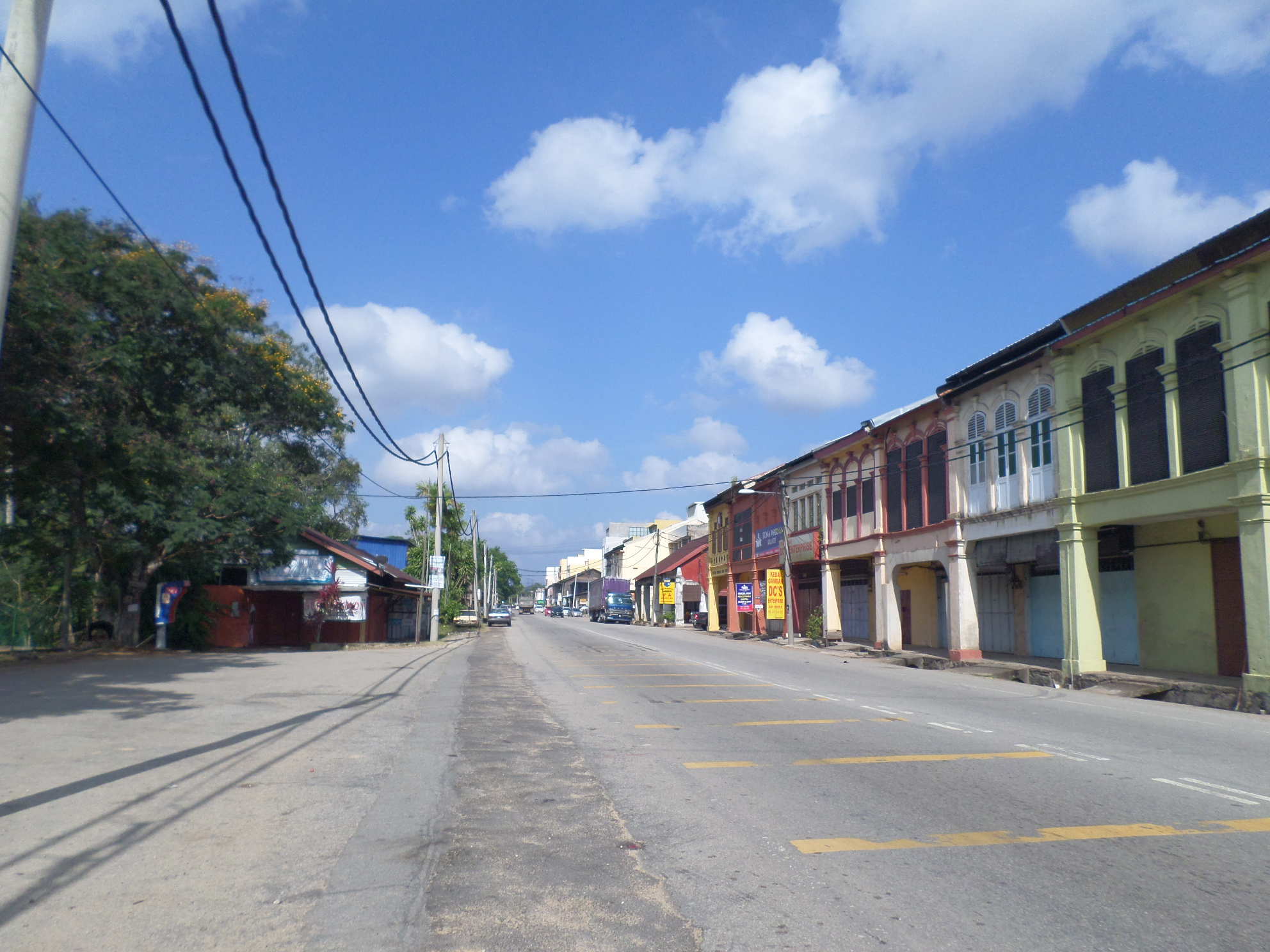
Main road of the Gambang town.

Gambang had been developed to be an education city in the past ten years, starting with the building of Kolej Universiti Kejuruteraan dan Teknologi Malaysia (KUKTEM), now known as Universiti Malaysia Pahang. After Universiti Malaysia Pahang was built, the Federal Government under the Ministry of Education formed a foundation college in Gambang, named Kolej Matrikulasi Pahang, with the first intake of students starting on 5 April 2003.

Currently, the government is in the process of building a Universiti Teknologi MARA branch in Gambang. The project had just been started. At the same time, the government built the permanent pre-university campus of International Islamic University Malaysia.

Other than universities and colleges, a sports school was also built in Gambang. Sekolah Sukan Pahang (or known by the locals as Sekolah Sukan Gambang) is the third sports school formed after Sekolah Sukan Bukit Jalil and Sekolah Sukan Tunku Mahkota Ismail. The school is located directly in front of the main entrance to Universiti Malaysia Pahang. Akademi Bolasepak Negara Mokhtar Dahari, a football academy for young talents, is located adjacent to Sekolah Sukan Pahang. It started its first intake in 2018.

== Attractions ==
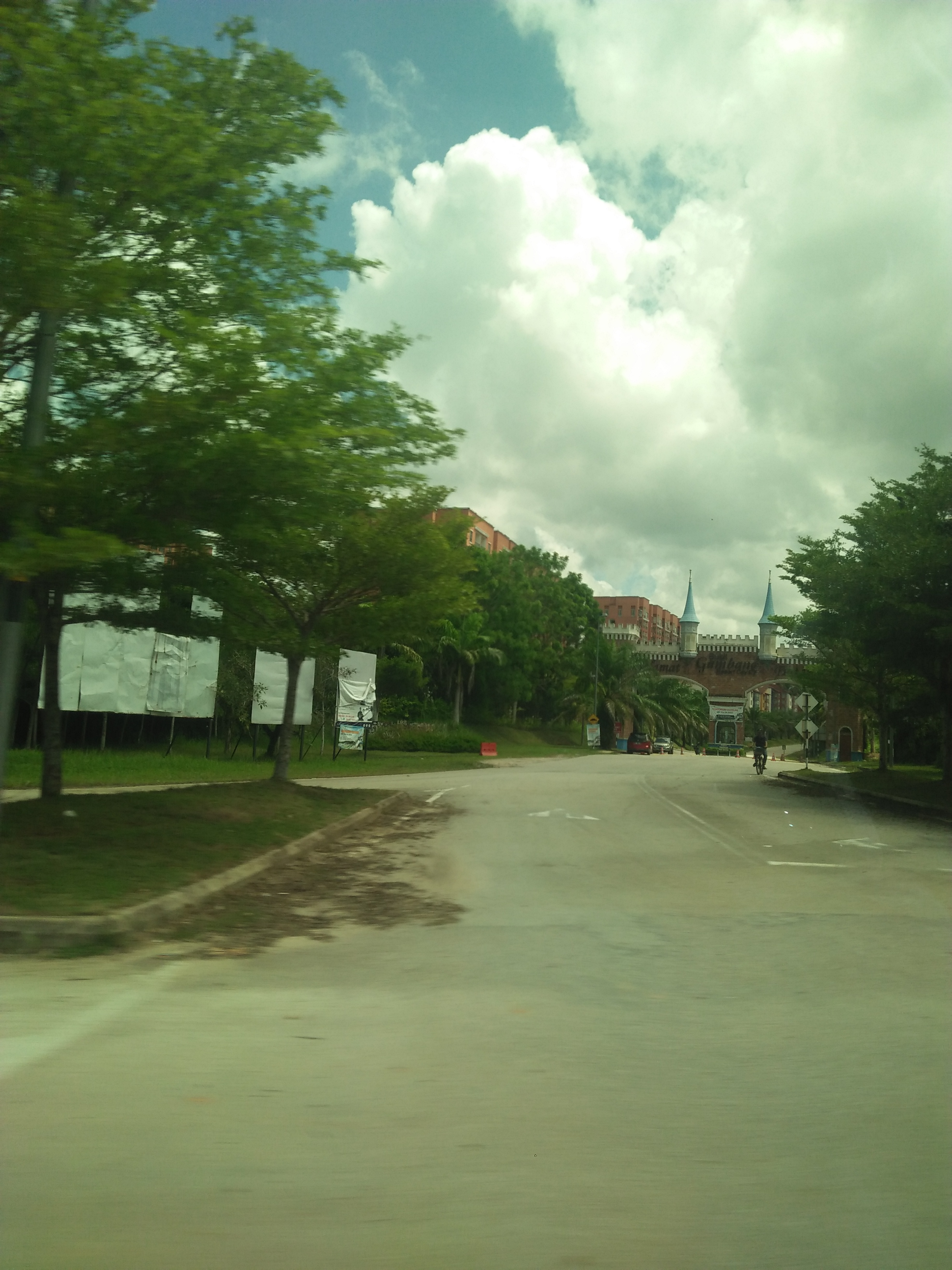
Gambang Water Park entrance as seen from the main road.

The main attraction in Gambang is the Bukit Gambang Resort City. Currently, Bukit Gambang Resort City houses apartments, hotels, and a water-recreational centre. Located eight kilometers from Universiti Malaysia Pahang, Bukit Gambang Resort City is a tourist attraction among Malaysians and non-Malaysians.

Apart from the resort, Pusat Rekreasi Sungai Pancing (Pancing River Recreational Centre) is also located there. It is a waterfall outside of the jungle in Gambang, and a popular spot for the locals to spend their weekend.

During Ramadan (the Islamic fasting month), there is a bazaar held in Gambang. It sells a wide variety of food, from traditional cakes to desserts. The bazaar will be opened at Gambang's main crossroads, located two kilometres from Gambang's toll gate.
