= Keratong =

Keratong is a mukim in Rompin district, Pahang, Malaysia. According to the 2020 Census of Malaysia, the population was 42,951. There are 10 felda in the area, which are organized into the subdivisions Selancar, Bandar Tun Razak, and Perantau Damai.
