= Rompin District =

- District of Pahang
- Daerah Rompin
- Seal
- Interactive map of Rompin District
- Location of Rompin District in Malaysia
- Coordinates: 2°50′N 103°15′E
- Country: Malaysia
- State: Pahang
- Seat: Kuala Rompin
- Local area government(s): Rompin District Council

Government
  - District officer: Ahmad Nasim Bin Dato' Haji Mohd Sidek

Area
  - Total: 5,734.93 km^{2} (2,214.27 sq mi)

Population (2010)
  - Total: 105,606
  - Density: 18.4145/km^{2} (47.6934/sq mi)
- Time zone: UTC+8 (MST)
  - Summer (DST): UTC+8 (Not observed)
- Postcode: 26xxx
- Calling code: +6-09
- Vehicle registration plates: C

The Rompin District is a district located in the southeastern corner of Pahang, Malaysia. Rompin is currently under the Rompin District Council.

The district covers an area of 5,296 km and located 130 kilometres from Kuantan, the capital city of Pahang. It is bordered to the north by Pekan District, to the west by Bera District, to the south by the state of Johor, and to the east by the South China Sea.

The main town is Kuala Rompin and other town located in the district is Bandar Muadzam Shah. Main tourist attractions in Rompin is the island resort of Tioman Island.

== Etymology ==
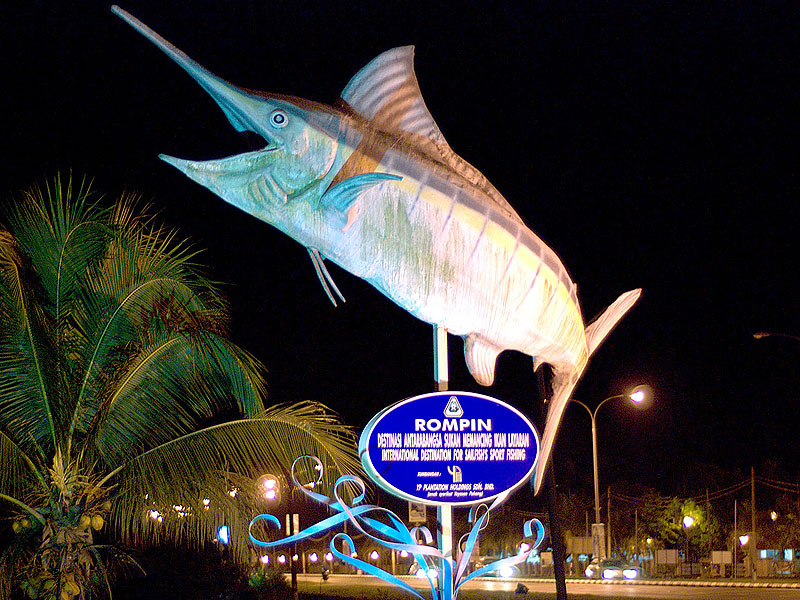
Marlin Statue in Kuala Rompin.

It is said that once upon a time in this area there was a Pokok Ru (ru tree). The ru tree is unique compared to other ru trees that live cascading here because of its slender shape. It is believed that the circumference of the tree can accommodate 40 people to eat together. At first people called this place as ru ramping, and over time the name of this place changed to rumpin and rompin.

In 1926, Kuala Rompin became a fishing village often visited by traders traveling back and forth from Singapore and Kuantan. In 1952, the Pahang government established four sub-districts namely Jerantut, Chenor, Triang and Rompin. In order to facilitate the establishment of an administrative system, administrative officers are appointed along with assistant officers. On December 16, 1952, J.B. Melford was appointed Rompin's first assistant district officer. The Rompin district administration is divided into five districts namely Tioman, Endau, Pontian, Keratong and Kuala Rompin. Kuala Rompin was made the administrative center. On 31 July 1976, Sultan Haji Ahmad Shah declared and promoted the Rompin area as a whole as a district in the state of Pahang.

== Administration ==
Rompin District is administered by the Rompin District Council based in Kuala Rompin. This district is divided into six districts, five cities and two towns.

=== Mukim ===
1. Endau
2. Keratong
3. Pontian
4. Rompin
5. Tioman
6. Bebar

=== Cities and towns ===
1. Bandar Rompin (I, II, III, IV)
2. Bandar Pontian
3. Bandar Endau
4. Bandar Muadzam Shah (I, II)
5. Bandar Tioman
6. Pekan Kuala Rompin
7. Pekan Tioman

== Demographics ==
Historical population
Year	Pop.	±%
1980	38,975	—
1991	80,251	+105.9%
2000	102,033	+27.1%
2010	109,848	+7.7%
2020	98,065	−10.7%

Based on the 2020 Malaysian census, the total population in Rompin District is 98,065 people with a population density of 19 people per square kilometer which is categorized as a sparse population distribution. The majority of residents in this district are Bumiputera, making up more than 96 percent of the population. The second largest race is Chinese followed by Indians. More than eight percent of the population are non-citizens.[1]

The ratio of male population to female population is 120:100. There are 33,471 residential places with a total of 27,110 households. The average household size was recorded as four people in a house. More than 66,000 people are of working age, 25,000 are young and the remaining 6,000 are elderly.

Pecahan etnik di Rompin - Bancian 2020
Kaum	Peratus
Bumiputera	96.6%
Cina	1.8%
India	1.0%
Lain-lain	0.7%

Ethnic groups in Rompin, 2010 census
Ethnicity	Population	Percentage
Bumiputera	101,236	95.9%
Chinese	2,815	2.7%
Indian	1,126	1.1%
Others	429	0.4%
Total	105,606	100%

=== Religion ===
Religion in Rompin - Census 2020
Religion	Percent
Islam	82.4%
No Religion	13.4%
Buddha	2.0%
Hinduisme	1.2%
Christian	0.6%
Others	0.2%

The majority of the population in the Rompin district is Muslim, consisting of Malays and some other ethnicities. The second largest group is the non-religious population which mostly consists of Bumiputeras other than Malays. The second largest religion is Buddhism which is mostly practiced by the Chinese population. The third largest religion is Hinduism, the majority of which are made up of the Indian population.[1]

== Geography ==
Rompin District is located in the south of the state of Pahang bordering;

- The state of Johor, namely the Segamat and Mersing districts in the south,
- Bera in the west,
- Maran in the northwest,
- Pekan in the north and
- South China Sea in the east

Rompin District is a large district and has a large area of forest reserve which is 1,334 square kilometers or 25 percent of the total area of this district. These forest reserves are concentrated in the northern and western parts of the district while mangrove swamp forests are concentrated in the water area of the district.[1] Rompin District also has several islands in its waters such as Tioman Island, Tulai Island, Sembilang Island, Seri Buat Island, Aceh Island, Layak Island and Labas Island.

=== Climate ===
The climate in this area is an equatorial climate (Af).[2] The average temperature is 26.58 °C (79.8 °F). May is the hottest month in the region with temperatures reaching 27.3 °C (81.1 °F). December and January are categorized as the coldest months with temperatures of 25.8 °C (78.4 °F).[2] The average precipitation in Rompin is 2625.9 millimeters per year. December is the month with the highest precipitation with 581 millimeters while the lowest month is February with 111.4 millimeters.[2]

Climate data for Rompin (2009-2019)
Month	Jan	Feb	Mar	Apr	May	Jun	Jul	Aug	Sep	Oct	Nov	Dec	Year
Daily mean °C (°F)	25.8 (78.4)	26.4 (79.5)	26.8 (80.2)	27.2 (81.0)	27.3 (81.1)	27.2 (81.0)	26.8 (80.2)	26.7 (80.1)	26.5 (79.7)	26.4 (79.5)	26.0 (78.8)	25.8 (78.4)	26.6 (79.8)
Average precipitation mm (inches)	288.3 (11.35)	111.4 (4.39)	159.5 (6.28)	147.2 (5.80)	179.0 (7.05)	142.5 (5.61)	142.8 (5.62)	172.7 (6.80)	171.5 (6.75)	216.5 (8.52)	313.5 (12.34)	581.0 (22.87)	2,625.9 (103.38)
Source: ClimateCharts

== Federal Parliament and State Assembly Seats ==
List of Rompin district representatives in the Federal Parliament (Dewan Rakyat)

Parliament	Seat Name	Member of Parliament	Party
P91	Rompin	Abdul Khalib Abdullah	Perikatan Nasional (BERSATU)

List of Rompin district representatives in the State Legislative Assembly of Pahang

State	Seat Name	State Assemblyman	Party
N40	Bukit Ibam	Nazri Ahmad	Perikatan Nasional (PAS)
N41	Muadzam Shah	Razali Kassim	Barisan Nasional (UMNO)
N42	Tioman	Mohd Johari Hussain	Barisan Nasional (UMNO)

== Transportation ==
=== Land ===
Federal Route 3 is the main thoroughfare through this constituency. Southwards it goes all the way to Johor Bahru; northwards it leads first to the royal capital Pekan, then the state capital Kuantan, then through Kuala Terengganu and Kota Bharu. Federal Route 63 is another important route for the constituency; it begins at the junction with highway Federal Route 3 near Kuala Rompin, runs through Bandar Muadzam Shah before ending at Bukit Ibam.

=== Public transport ===
As with most of eastern Pahang, KTM Intercity does not serve Rompin. rapidKuantan buses also do not serve this constituency at this stage.

=== Air transport ===
The Lanjut Airstrip is located within the district, adjacent to the Lanjut Beach and Golf Resort. It does not have any scheduled flights, and primarily serves for recreational or private use.

== Prominent residents ==
- Jamaluddin Jarjis – former Ambassador of Malaysia to the United States, former Malaysian government minister, late Member of Parliament for Rompin.

== See also ==
- Districts of Malaysia
