= Bandar Muadzam Shah =

- Sub-district

Other transcription(s)
  - Chinese: 姆阿占沙
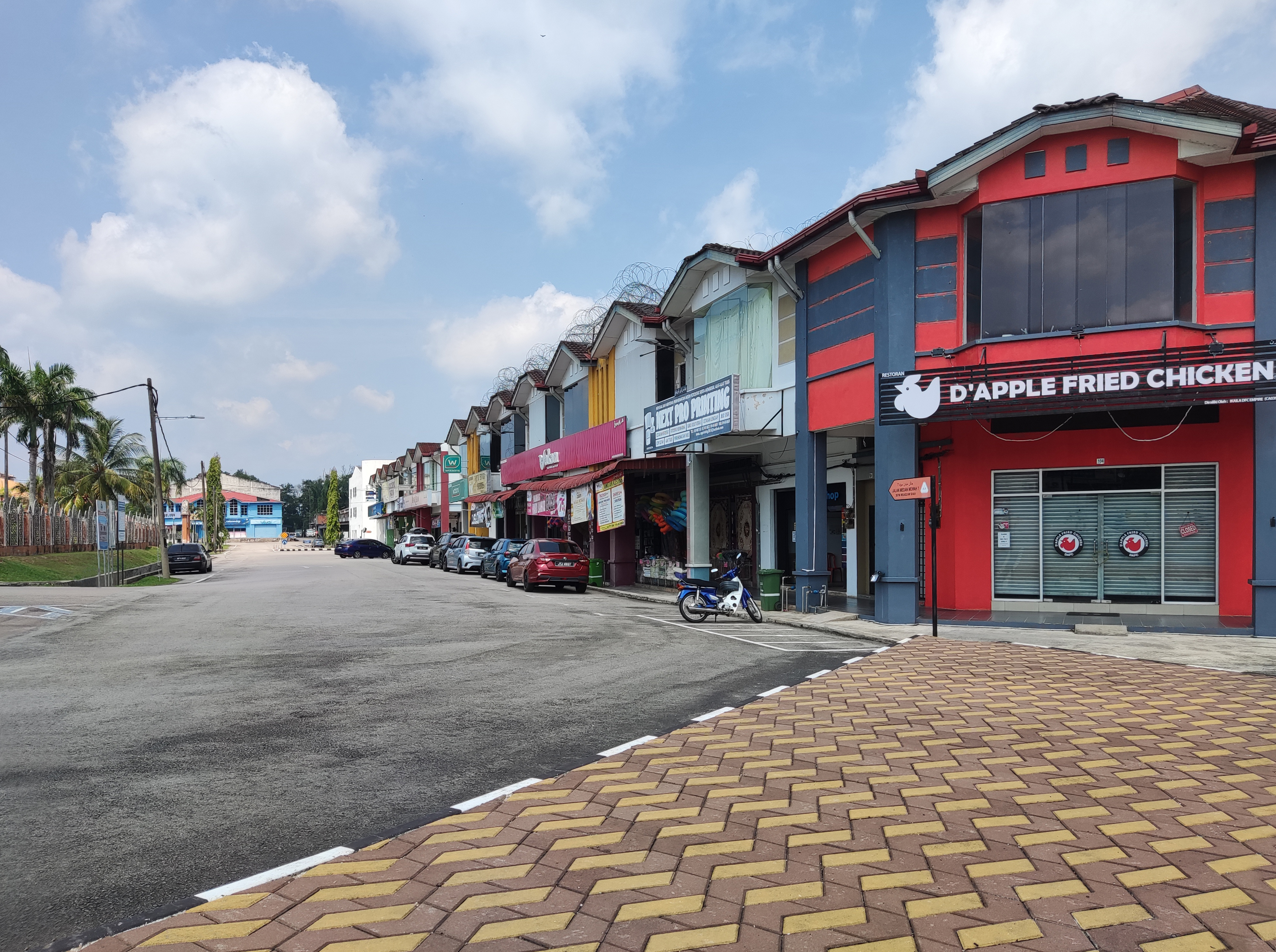
- Street of Muadzam Shah
- Interactive map of Bandar Muadzam Shah
- Coordinates: 3°5′N 103°6′E
- Country: Malaysia
- State: Pahang
- District: Rompin

Government
  - Local government: Rompin District Council
- Time zone: UTC+8 (MST)
  - Summer (DST): Not observed
- Postal code: 26600
- Website: mdrompin.gov.my

Muadzam Shah (in full Bandar Muadzam Shah) is a sub-district in Rompin District, Pahang, Malaysia. The town was established in 1979 by the South-East Pahang Development Authority (DARA) under the purview of the second Malaysian Prime Minister, Tun Abdul Razak, who also happened to be a native of the neighboring royal town of Pekan.

== Background ==
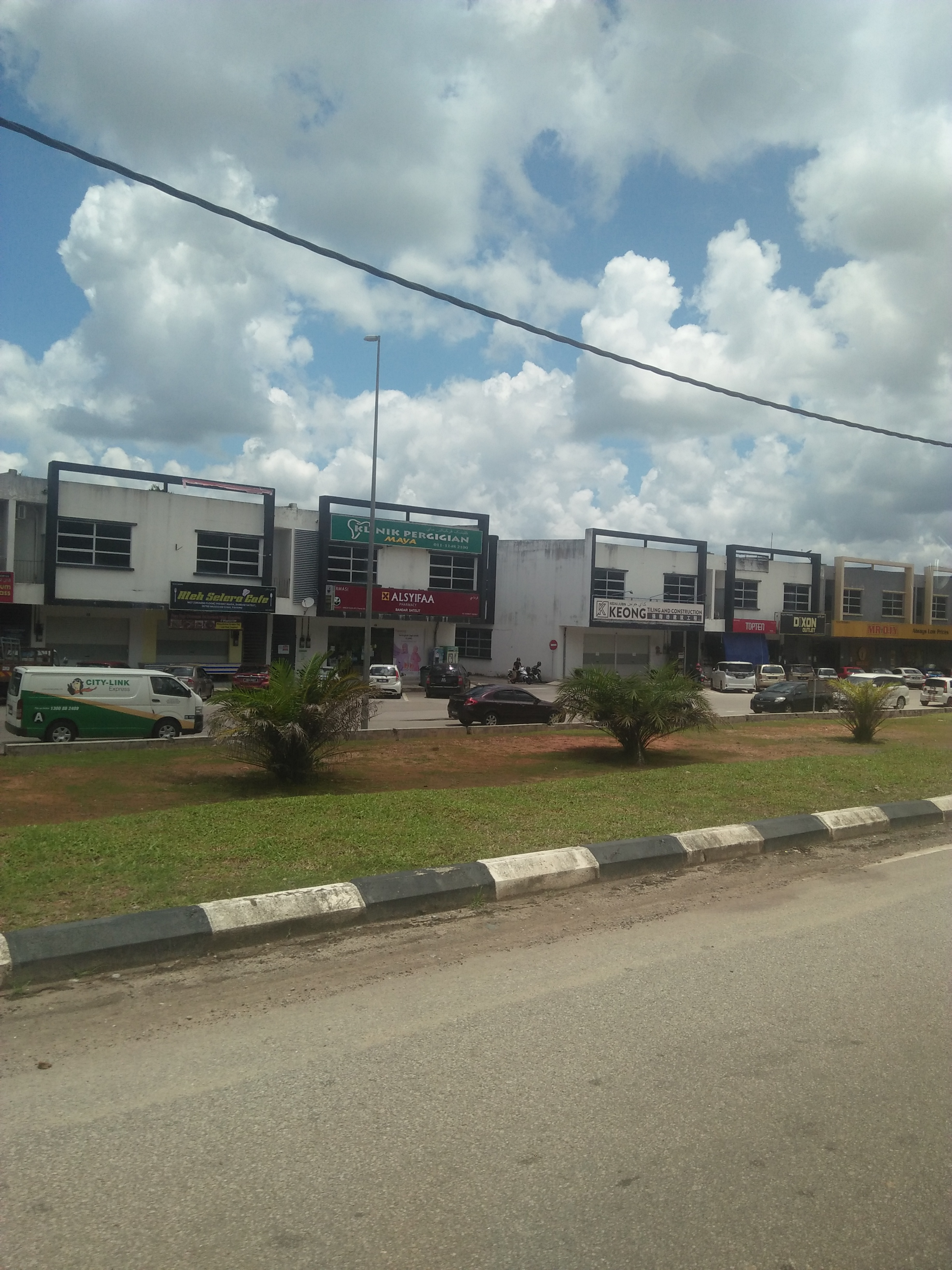
Shop lot in Muadzam Shah.

Bandar Muadzam Shah, a rather quiet and tranquil but well-planned town situated inland in south-east Pahang, was a brainchild of Malaysia's second Prime Minister Tun Abdul Razak.

His vision, amongst others, was for the town to eventually become a fully established educational center with quality schools and higher academic institutions serving the surrounding rural regions, and having its own fully integrated public administration services.

Lembaga Kemajuan Pahang Tenggara (DARA) (or South-East Pahang Development Authority) was formed to undertake and oversee the development and success of the region. DARA started the phased development of the town in 1979 and administered the town for 25 years until it was taken over by the Pekan and then by the Rompin District Office.

Bandar Muadzam Shah is named after the fourth Sultan of modern Pahang, Sultan Abu Bakar Riayatuddin Al-Muadzam Shah, who reigned Pahang from 1932 to 1974.

== Phased development ==
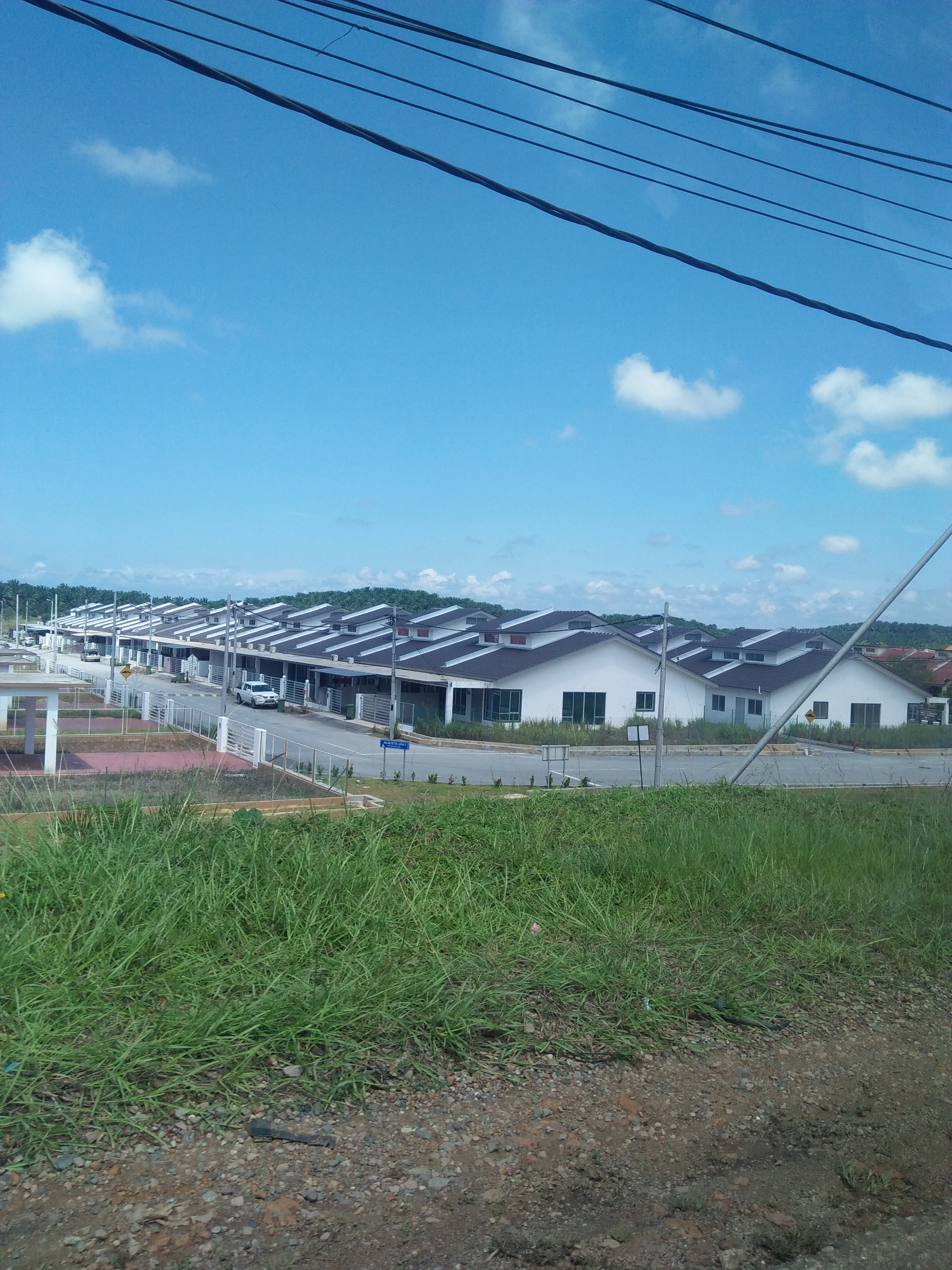
Muadzam Shah residence.

Although the ideal development as envisaged by the late Tun Razak has yet to be fully materialized, Bandar Muadzam Shah has since developed. It has improved infrastructure and spread of educational and government public services in place, that are not found in some other towns in the Rompin district.

The town has a General Hospital that provides general and also specialist care services, besides having wards for general, women and maternity cases.

Other than the District office and Land office, there area several important government administrative offices and services like the Road Transport Department, Islamic Department, the Police and Fire Departments, and the Courts of Justice.

Already established are various primary and secondary schools, such as Sekolah Menengah Teknik, Maktab Rendah Sains Mara (MRSM), Sekolah Kebangsaan and Sekolah Menengah Kebangsaan (SMK) Muadzam Jaya and SMK (A) Pahang.

University Tenaga Nasional (UNITEN), one of Malaysia's top universities with its main campus in Kajang, has a branch campus, the UNITEN Sultan Haji Ahmad Shah Campus, at Bandar Muadzam Shah.

A big polytechnic complex (Politeknik Muadzam Shah) was opened in 2003.

Around the town centre, there is a mosque and scattered rows of retail shops and private offices, and the popular Muadzam Bazaar that is connected via a walkway to the bus and taxi terminal.

This bus and taxi terminal serves as a transport hub for rural residents having errands with the government departments or appointments at the general hospital, as the town is surrounded by many rural villages and smaller towns like Bukit Ibam and Keratong.

The residential estates surround the town and they are comparatively well-planned, near to shops, restaurants and public amenities.

According to statistic on 2007, Bandar Muadzam Shah has a total population around 15,000 people.

A satellite town is under construction after launching by Menteri Besar of Pahang, Dato' Seri Adnan Yaakob to support demand from the expanding population at Muadzam Shah [2010]

Farm Fresh milk production factory also within the town, provides high quality fresh milk to the market.

== Homestay programmes ==
Homestay programmes are programmes in which tourists stay in the homes of local villagers to experience village life and local culture. Many of Muadzam Shah's homestay programs include visits to Orang Asli (aborigines) villages such as Kampong Kedaik and Kampong Tanam. In these villages, Orang Asli still carry out traditional activities like crafting blowpipes.

== Politics ==
Bandar Muadzam Shah lends its name to the State electoral constituency of Muadzam Shah, represented by Dato's Ir. Razali Kassim from Barisan Nasional. Its representative to the Malaysian Parliament is Abdul Khalib Abdullah from Perikatan Nasional after winning the 15th Malaysia General Election against former representative, Datuk Hasan Ariffin from Barisan Nasional.

== Education ==
=== Primary schools ===
- SK Muadzam Shah
- SK Bukit Ridan
- SK Muadzam Jaya
- SK Bukit Ibam
- SK Kedaik
- SK Ladang Kota Bahagia
- SK Perantau Damai

=== Secondary schools ===
- SMK Agama Pahang
- SMK Muadzam Shah
- SMK Muadzam Jaya
- Kolej Vokasional Muadzam Shah
- Maktab Rendah Sains Mara
- SMA Bukit Ibam
- SMK Perantau Damai

=== Higher education ===
- Universiti Tenaga Nasional (UNITEN)
- Politeknik Muadzam Shah
