= Kuantan =

Kuantan Kontaeng (Pahang Malay) Kuatang (Terengganu Malay)
- State capital city and district capital
- City of Kuantan Bandaraya Kuantan (Malay)
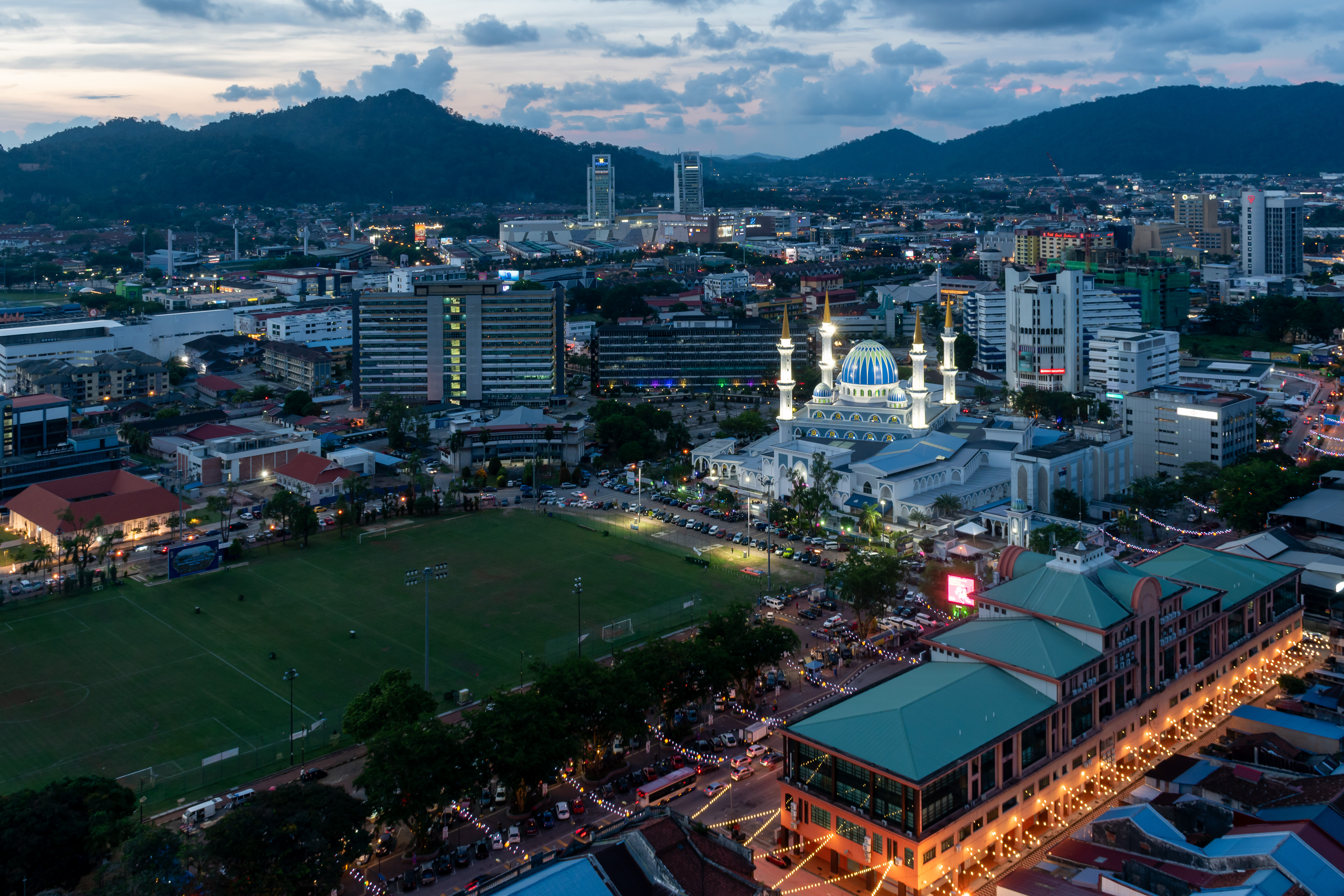
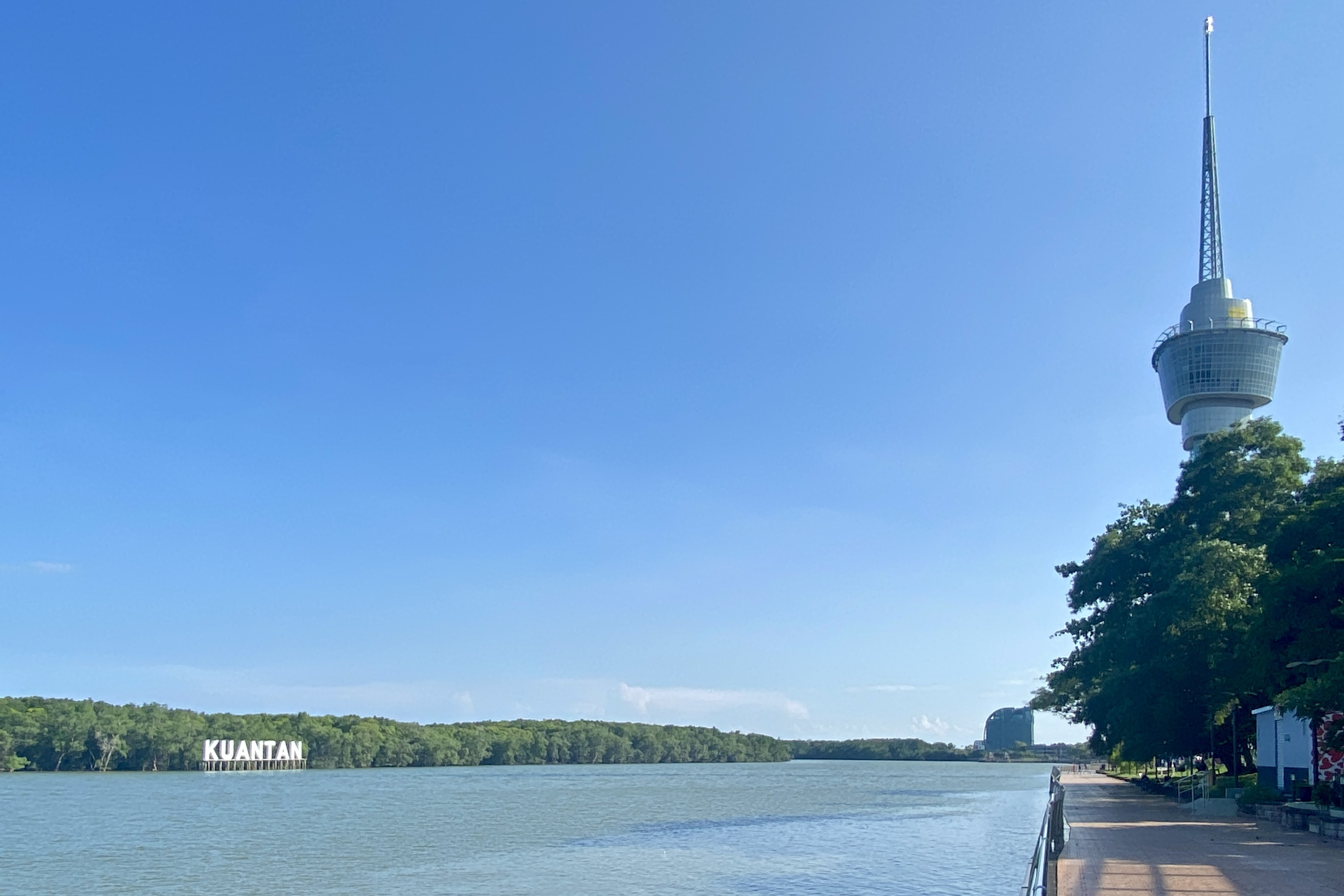
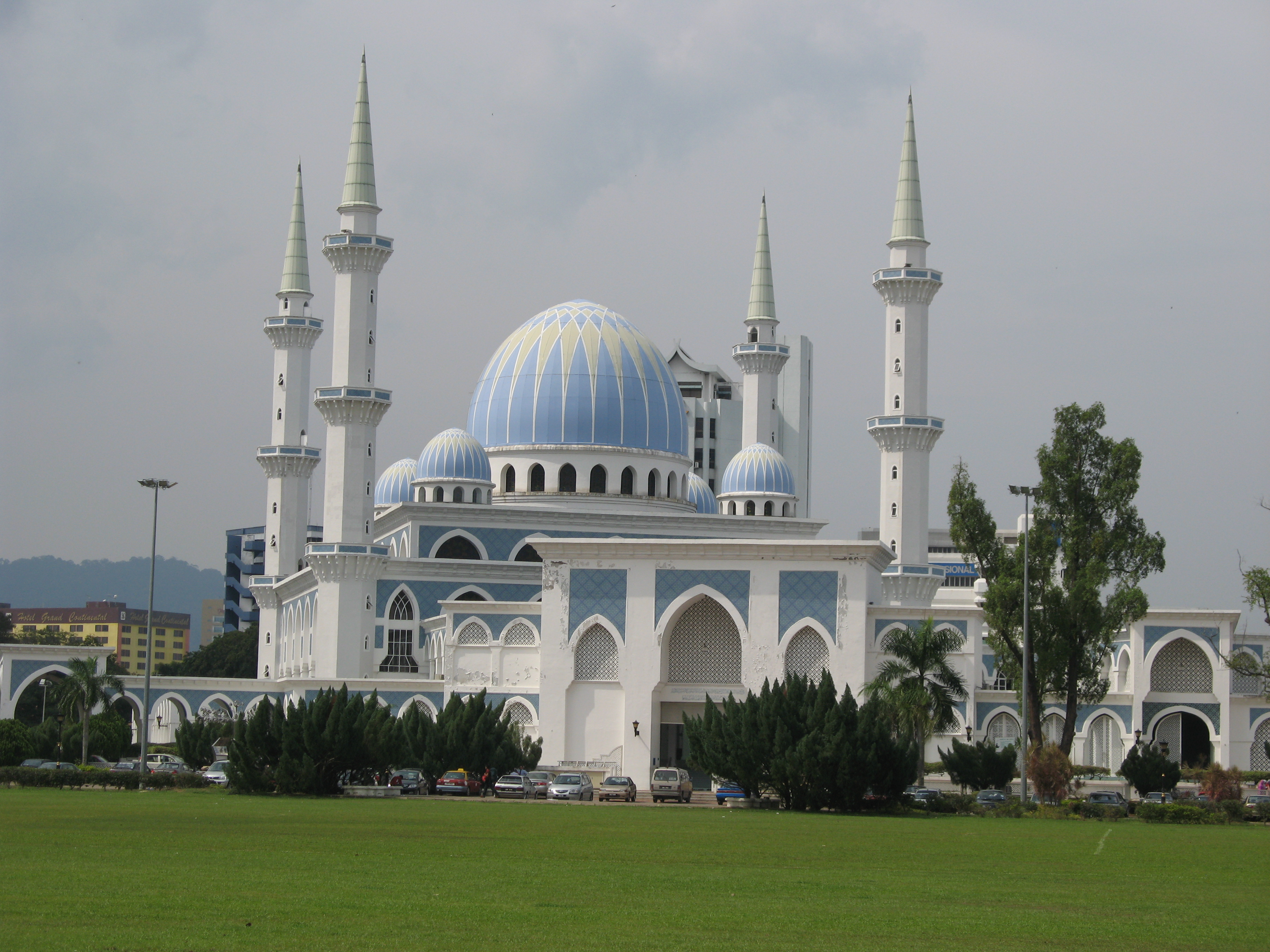
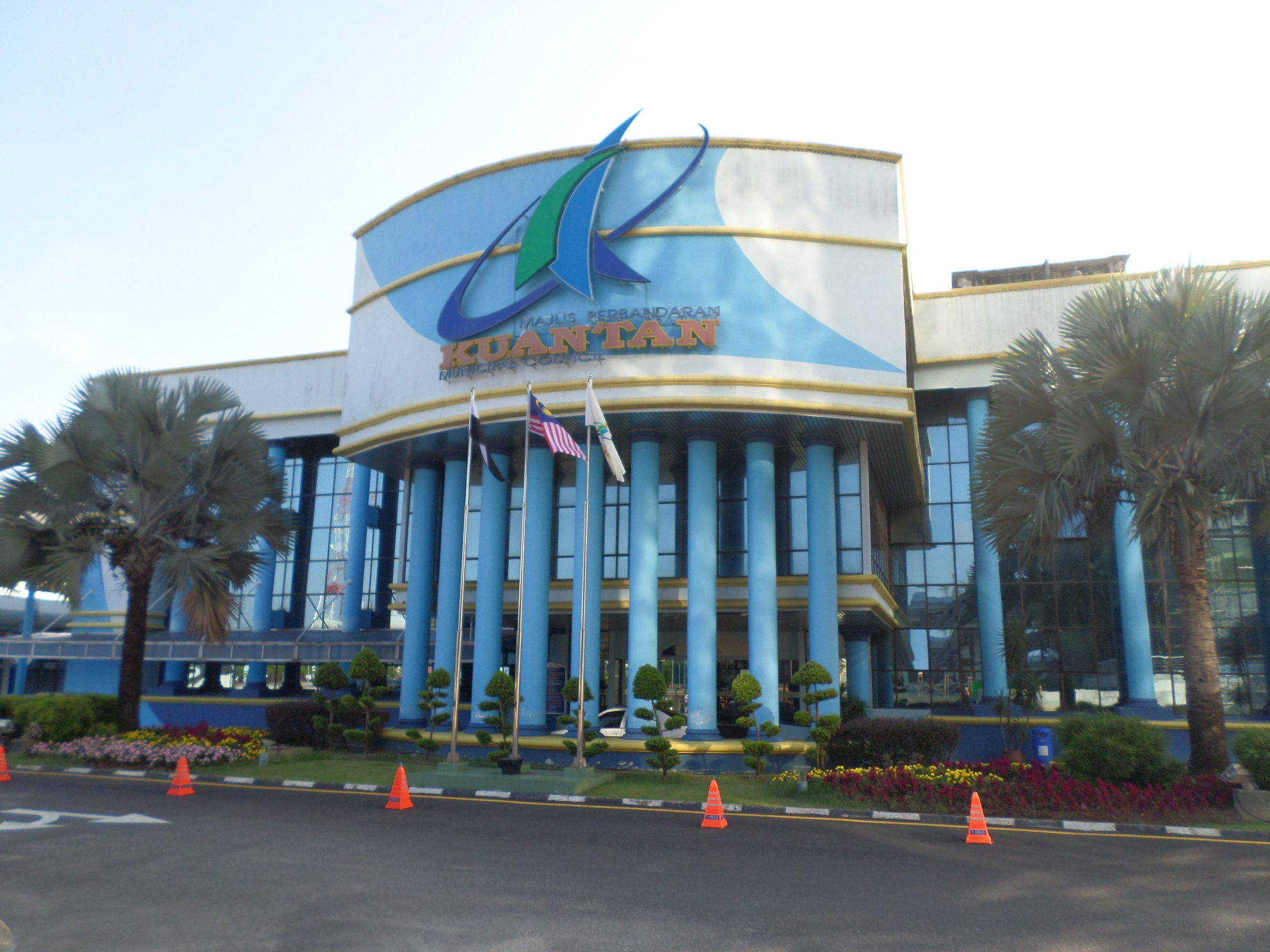
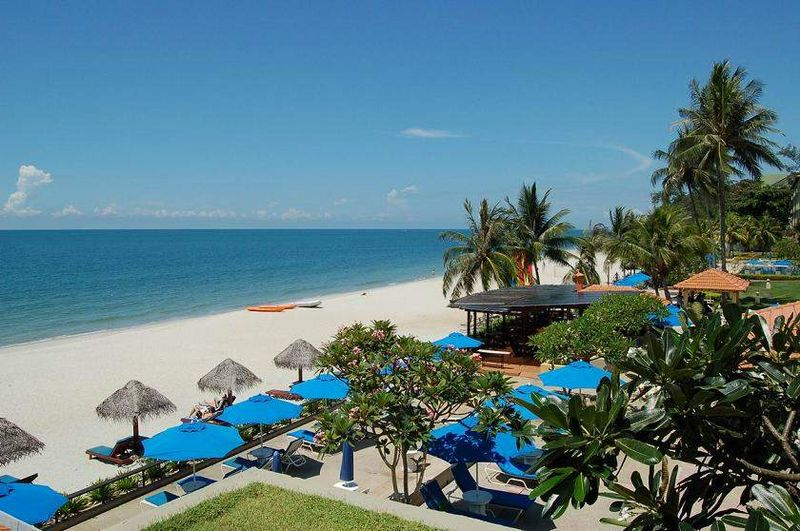
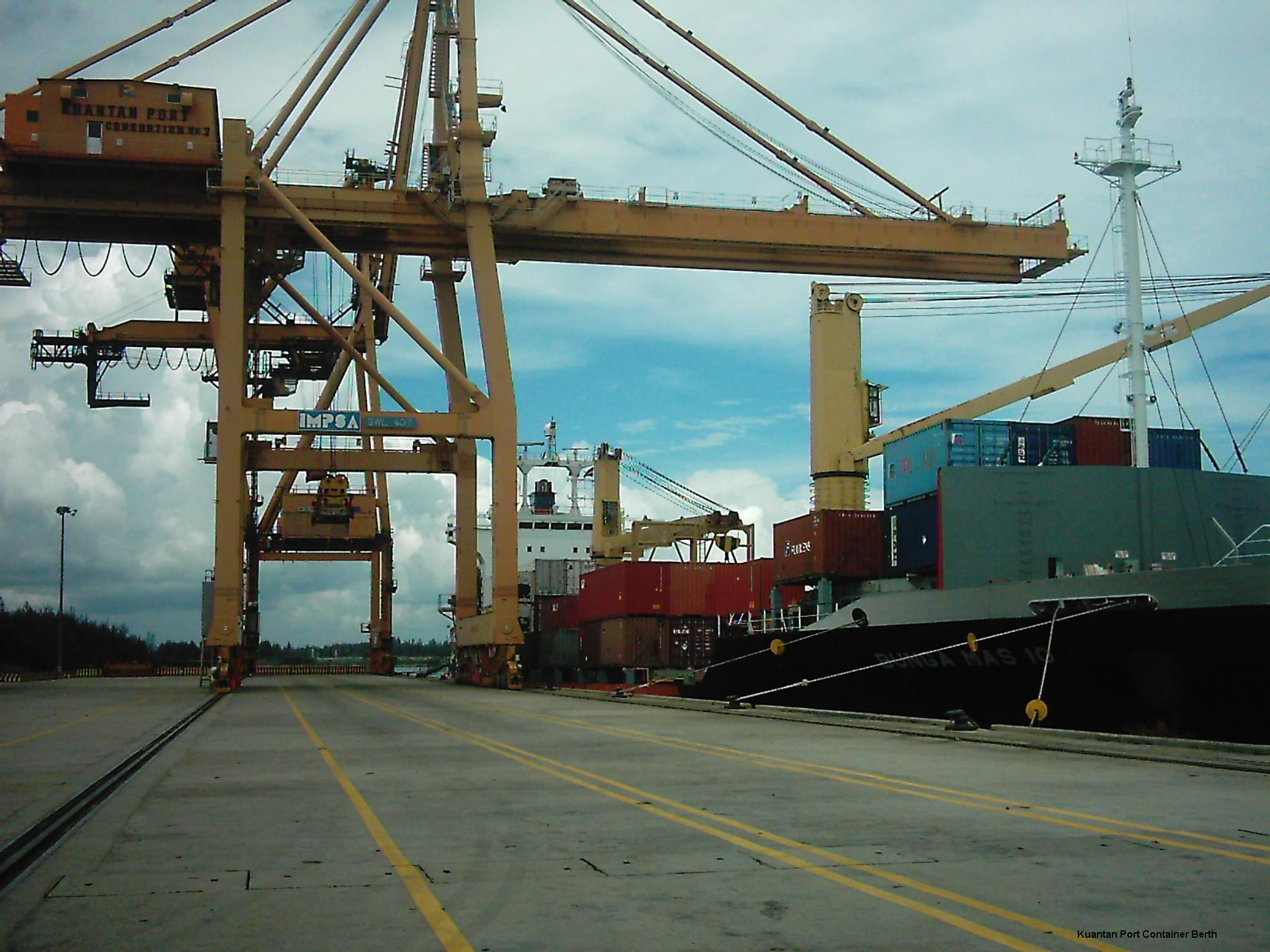
- Aerial view of Kuantan Kuantan River and Kuantan 188 Sultan Ahmad Shah State Mosque Kuantan City Council Palm Beach Kuantan Port

- Seal
- Interactive map of Kuantan
- Kuantan in Pahang Kuantan (Malaysia) Kuantan (Southeast Asia) Kuantan (Asia)
- Coordinates: 3°49′N 103°20′E
- Country: Malaysia
- State: Pahang
- District: Kuantan
- Founded: 1851 (as Kampung Teruntum)
- Establishment: 1 August 1913
- Administrative centre: 27 August 1955
- Municipality status: 1 September 1979
- City status: 21 February 2021

Government
  - Type: City council
  - Body: Kuantan City Council
  - Mayor: Dato' Zaliza Zulkipli

Area
  - Total: 324 km^{2} (125 sq mi)
- Elevation: 21.95 m (72.0 ft)

Population (2020)
  - Total: 548,014
  - Density: 1,691/km^{2} (4,380/sq mi)
- Demonym: Kuantanese
- Time zone: UTC+8 (MST)
  - Summer (DST): Not observed
- Postcode: 25xxx
- Mean solar time: UTC+06:46:48
- Website: mbk.gov.my

Kuantan (Pahang Malay: Kontaeng; Terengganu Malay: Kuatang/Kuantang) is a city and the state capital of Pahang, Malaysia. It is located near the mouth of the Kuantan River. Kuantan is the 12th largest city in Malaysia based on a 2020 population of 548,014 and the largest city on the East Coast of Peninsular Malaysia.

The administrative centre of the state of Pahang was officially relocated to Kuantan on 27 August 1955 from Kuala Lipis, and was officiated by HRH Sultan Abu Bakar Ri'ayatuddin Al Muadzam Shah, the Sultan of Pahang.

== History ==
Kuantan in the first century was a part of Chih-Tu empire. In the 11th century, this piece of land was conquered by another small empire called Pheng-Kheng before being taken over by the Siamese during the 12th century. During the 15th century, Kuantan was ruled by the Malaccan Empire.

Kuantan is said to have been founded in the 1850s. The name was notably mentioned in Munshi Abdullah's travelogue Kisah Pelayaran ke Kelantan circa 1851/2:

...On Thursday night came a boat from Kuantan. Then they told the ship's crew there's a pirate ship at Tanjung Tujuh, forty of them and at Kapas Island, and as well at Redang Island; it was spotted by two Kuantan boats and they set off...

In its early days, it was known as Kampung Teruntum (lit. 'Lumnitzera Village'). The village was situated at the mouth of Teruntum River which is in front of the current hospital and it was established by Haji Senik and his followers in the 1850s. Early primary economic activities included fishing and small businesses. The main evidence of the establishment of the village is the cemetery that is situated near Taman Esplanade in front of the current Hospital Tengku Ampuan Afzan.

Towards the late 19th century, arrival of Chinese miners and traders saw the establishment of a township in Kuantan and nearby tin mining areas such as Gambang and Sungai Lembing. Similar to what occurred in other states in Peninsular Malaysia, rubber plantations attracted Indian settlers as well.

The sinking of HMS Prince of Wales and HMS Repulse took place off the coast of Kuantan on 10 December 1941.

Kuantan was declared a full-fledged city by Sultan Abdullah of Pahang on 21 February 2021 and its town council officially renamed the Kuantan City Council (MBK).

== Government ==
The Pahang state government shifted the administrative centre of Pahang from Kuala Lipis to Kuantan in 1955. The urban area of Kuantan city is located mostly in the mukims of Kuala Kuantan and Beserah.

Kuantan City Council, formerly known as the Kuantan Sanitary Board (Malay: Lembaga Kesihatan Kuantan) from 1913 until 1937, the Kuantan Town Board (Malay: Lembaga Bandaran Kuantan) from 1937 until 1953, the Kuantan Town Council (Malay: Majlis Bandaran Kuantan) from 1953 to 31 August 1979 and the Kuantan Municipal Council (Malay: Majlis Perbandaran Kuantan) from 1 September 1979 until 20 February 2021, is the local authority of Kuantan.

=== Urban development ===
Part of the larger East Coast Economic Growth Region (ECER), Kuantan will see many new developments including:

- Relocation of the state administration centre to its proposed site in Kota Sultan Ahmad Shah (KotaSAS).
- Kuantan Port City consist of Kuantan Port expansion, Malaysia-China Kuantan Industrial Park, and Kuantan Integrated Biopark
- East Coast Rail Link (ECRL) from Kuala Lumpur to Kuantan. Moreover ECRL also passing through Bentong & Temerloh.
- Kuantan Waterfront Resort City at Tanjung Lumpur.
- Greater Kuantan development that stretches from Kertih, Terengganu to Pekan, Pahang.

== Climate ==
Kuantan features a tropical rainforest climate under the Köppen climate classification. Usually, the area experiences two seasons per year, i.e., the "Dry" and Hot season and the Rainy season. The "Dry" and Hot Season (a relative term as the city does not truly have a dry season) occurs when seasonal south-west winds blow from Sumatra toward the West Coast of Peninsular Malaysia but are blocked by the Titiwangsa Mountain Range. The temperature may reach 40 degrees Celsius. The Rainy season usually occurs between October and March. During this season, the north-east winds bring rain to Kuantan. It can get very cloudy with a large amount of rainfall. Floods may also occur. Areas subject to possible flooding include the road to Sungai Lembing and also a few areas along the Kuantan River.

In 2006, Kuantan experienced significant air pollution that affected visibility because of the haze blowing in from Sumatra and the West Coast of Peninsular Malaysia.

Climate data for Kuantan (1991–2020 normals)
Month	Jan	Feb	Mar	Apr	May	Jun	Jul	Aug	Sep	Oct	Nov	Dec	Year
Record high °C (°F)	34.2 (93.6)	35.0 (95.0)	35.3 (95.5)	36.0 (96.8)	37.8 (100.0)	36.4 (97.5)	36.0 (96.8)	34.9 (94.8)	35.3 (95.5)	35.6 (96.1)	34.0 (93.2)	33.1 (91.6)	37.8 (100.0)
Mean daily maximum °C (°F)	29.8 (85.6)	31.0 (87.8)	32.1 (89.8)	33.1 (91.6)	33.5 (92.3)	33.1 (91.6)	32.8 (91.0)	32.9 (91.2)	32.7 (90.9)	32.3 (90.1)	30.9 (87.6)	29.7 (85.5)	32 (90)
Daily mean °C (°F)	25.6 (78.1)	26.2 (79.2)	27.0 (80.6)	27.7 (81.9)	28.0 (82.4)	27.7 (81.9)	27.4 (81.3)	27.3 (81.1)	27.2 (81.0)	26.9 (80.4)	26.2 (79.2)	25.6 (78.1)	26.9 (80.4)
Mean daily minimum °C (°F)	22.9 (73.2)	22.9 (73.2)	23.5 (74.3)	24.1 (75.4)	24.3 (75.7)	24.1 (75.4)	23.9 (75.0)	23.8 (74.8)	23.6 (74.5)	23.6 (74.5)	23.5 (74.3)	23.2 (73.8)	23.6 (74.5)
Record low °C (°F)	17.0 (62.6)	17.5 (63.5)	17.5 (63.5)	19.5 (67.1)	20.5 (68.9)	19.5 (67.1)	19.0 (66.2)	19.5 (67.1)	19.0 (66.2)	20.0 (68.0)	18.0 (64.4)	18.0 (64.4)	17.0 (62.6)
Average precipitation mm (inches)	315.8 (12.43)	146.4 (5.76)	155.1 (6.11)	136.4 (5.37)	176.9 (6.96)	158.4 (6.24)	149.7 (5.89)	198.9 (7.83)	181.1 (7.13)	275.0 (10.83)	375.1 (14.77)	717.4 (28.24)	2,986 (117.6)
Average precipitation days (≥ 1.0 mm)	13.9	8.2	9.3	9.9	11.3	10.0	9.3	11.5	11.9	15.7	19.4	18.9	149.3
Average relative humidity (%)	86	84	84	85	84	83	83	83	83	84	88	87	84
Mean monthly sunshine hours	140	171	176	180	174	170	170	174	172	160	135	119	1,941
Source 1: World Meteorological Organization
Source 2: OgimetDeutscher Wetterdienst (humidity),

== Demographics ==
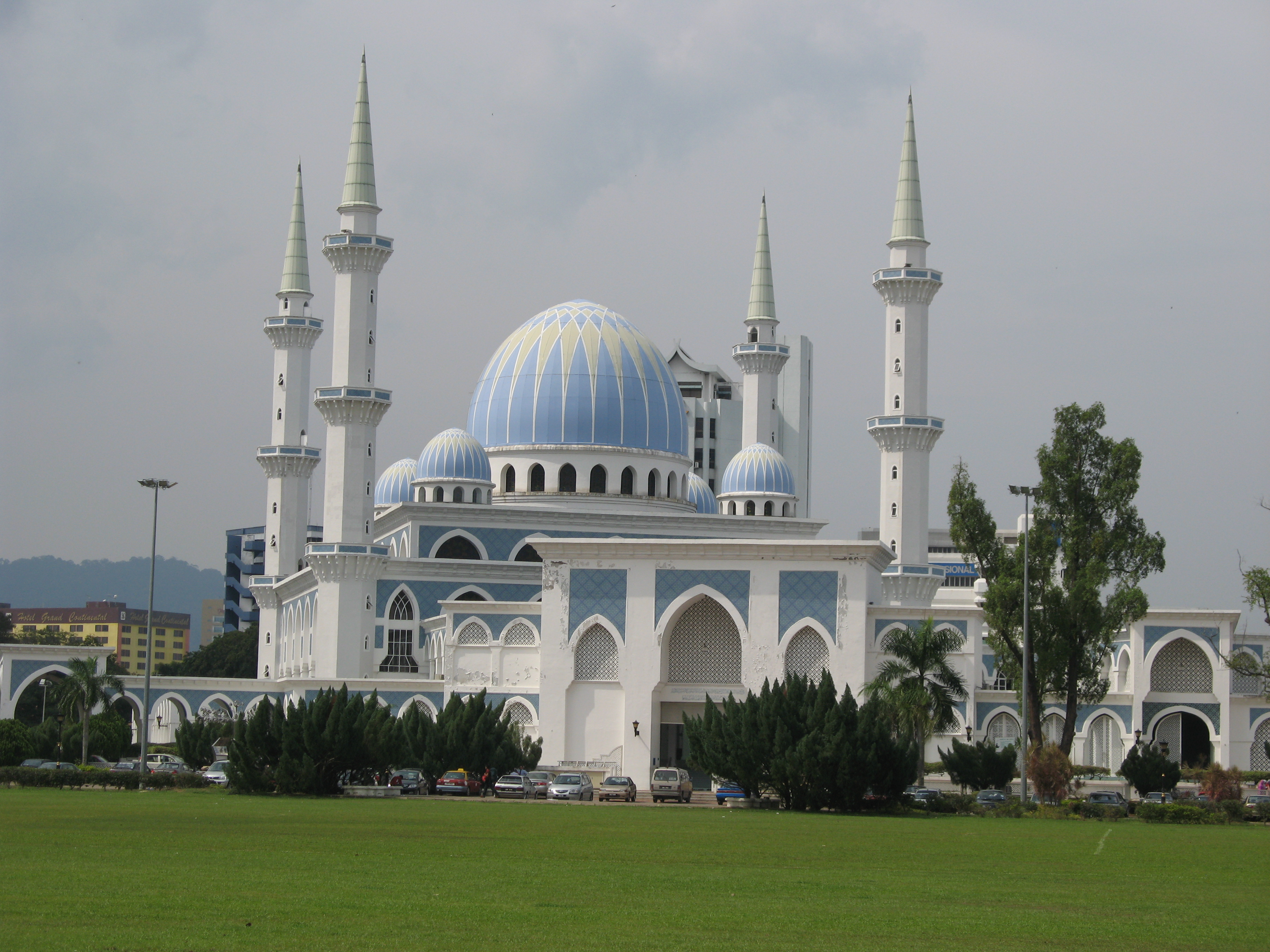
Pahang State Mosque.

Kuantan's population was approximately 427,515 in 2010 which was composed of 78.5% Malay, 17.9% Chinese, 3.3% Indian and 0.3% other races. The following is based on Department of Statistics Malaysia 2010 census.

Ethnic groups in Kuantan Municipal Council, 2010 census
Ethnicity	Population	Percentage
Bumiputera	335,599	78.5%
Chinese	76,525	17.9%
Indian	14,108	3.3%
Others	1,282	0.3%

By 2019, its population had grown to 529,600.

== Economy ==
One of its major economic activities is tourism. Domestically, it is famous for the production of handicrafts, batik, keropok (dried fish crackers) and salted fish. Kuantan serves as the administrative and commercial capital of Pahang. Trade and commerce are important in the economy of the town.

There are petrochemical industries, mostly in Gebeng, an industrial area about 25 km north of Kuantan. Among the major companies operating in Kuantan are BASF PETRONAS Chemicals, MTBE/Polypropylene (M) Sdn Bhd, BP Chemicals, MTBE, Flexsys, Bredero Shaw, Eastman Chemical, Kaneka, Polyplastics, Mieco, KNM, JiKang, W.R. Grace, Cryovac, Wasco Pipeline Coatings, AMC, etc.

=== ECER Special Economic Zone (ECER SEZ) ===
Kuantan is being identified as a Special Economic Zone (SEZ). The launch of SEZ in 2009 by Prime Minister Najib Tun Razak is one of the first of its kind in Malaysia. The SEZ is located inside East Coast Economic Region (ECER) of Greater Kuantan which stretches from the district of Kertih, Terengganu to the district of Pekan, Pahang. It is now one of the largest SEZs in Asia, covering 390,000 hectares. ECER SEZ serves as a catalyst to fast-track the economic development in the east coast. ECER SEZ aims to generate RM90 billion of investments and provide over 90,000 new jobs by 2020. At the centre of southeast Asia with four seaports (Kuantan Port as the main gateway) and two airports, ECER SEZ will serve good transportation link between Indochina, India and China.

The development master plan will offer special incentives to attract investors. Include tax exemptions, import and export duties exemptions and 100 per cent investment tax allowance.

== Tourism ==
=== Beaches ===
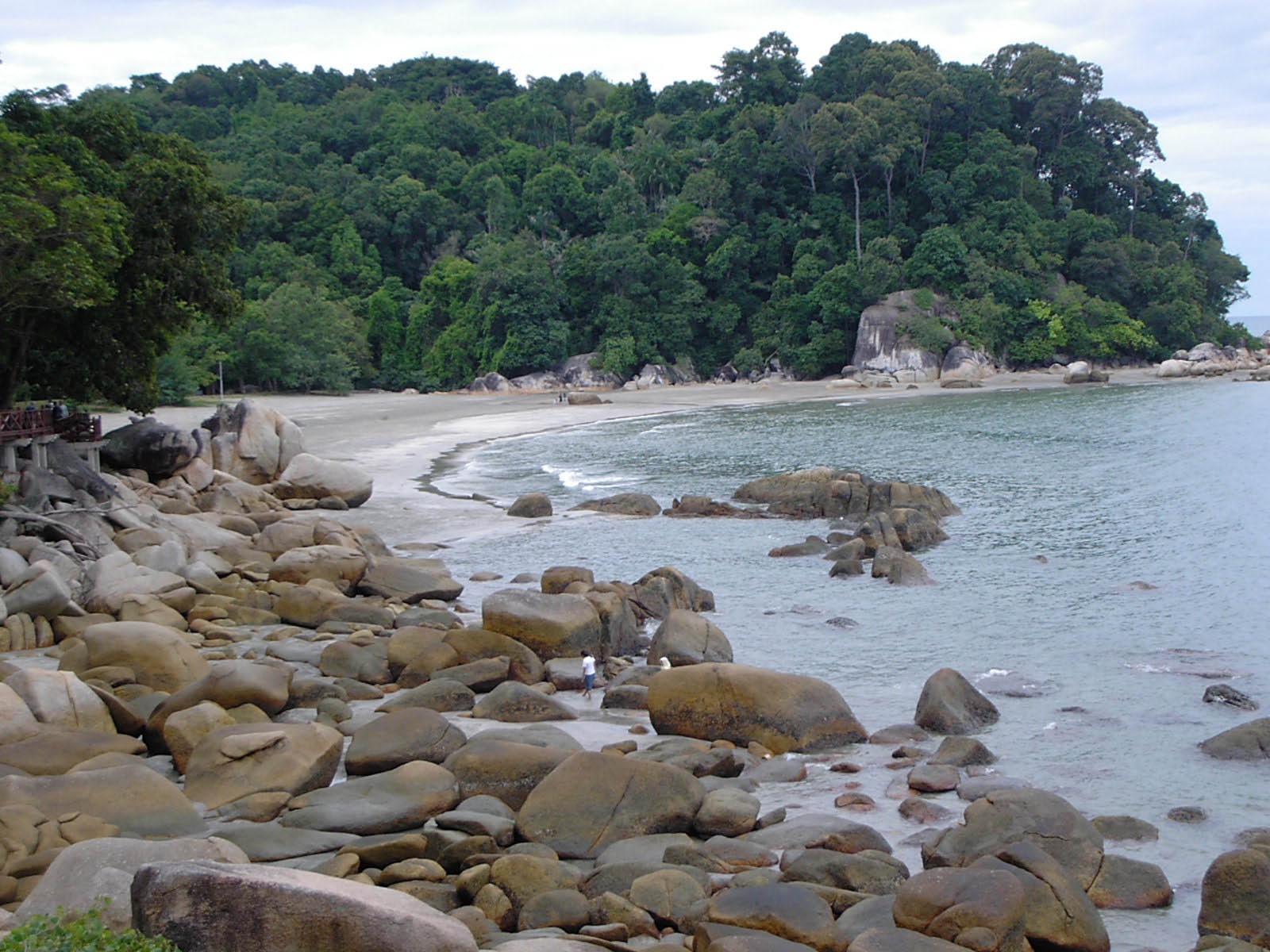
Teluk Cempedak beach.

Kuantan's main sightseeing attraction is the beach at Teluk Cempedak or Palm Beach. There are scenic beaches popular among vacationers in the city's vicinity, such as Batu Hitam, Balok, Chenor, Pantai Sepat, Beserah, and Cherating. Near Cherating (Club Med is located here) there are turtle sanctuaries. A few kilometres away from Cherating is Pulau Ular (Snake Island). There is a legend connected with this island.

=== Waterfalls and parks ===
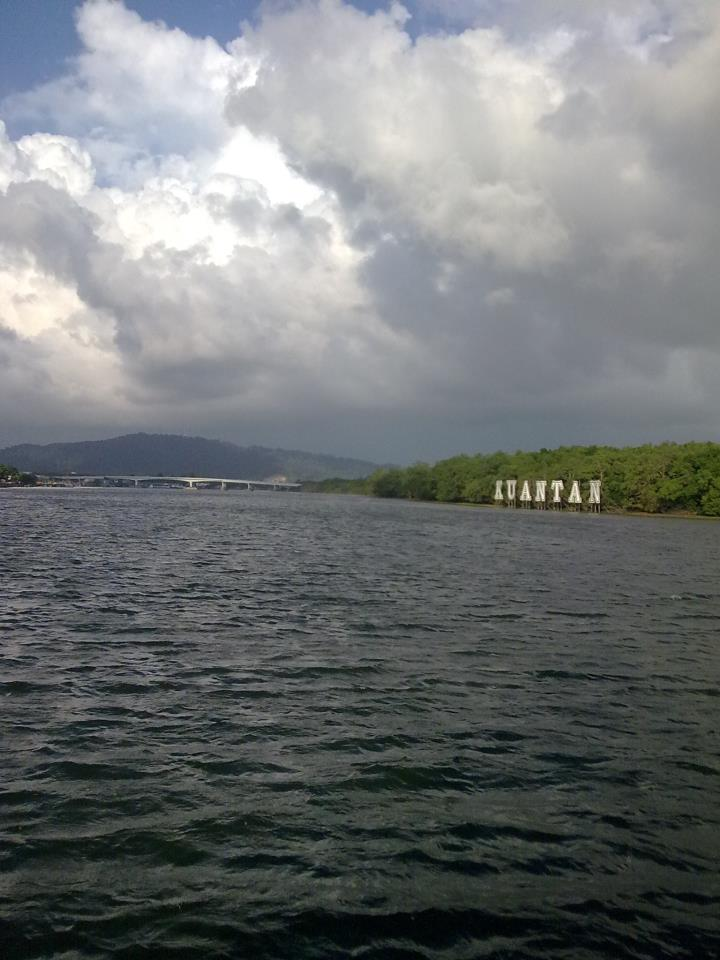
Kuantan river.

Kuantan is known to tourists for its waterfalls. The most well-known is the Sungai Pandan Waterfall. Two others are the Sungai Berkelah Waterfall and the Jerangkang Waterfall.

There are four parks in the city, the Gelora Park, Teruntum Mini Zoo, Gambang Safari Park and Agriculture Park at Indera Mahkota. A small park across the main road (and next to the river) in front of the Hospital is named the Esplanade Park or Downtown Kuantan. Here, it is possible to go on a river cruise from the small jetty. The Kuantan area also produces handicrafts and batik. Other tourist attractions include the State Mosque (Masjid Negeri).

=== Sungai Lembing ===
Sungai Lembing is located about 26 km northwest of Kuantan. It used to contain the world's deepest underground tin mines. There is an interesting Tin Museum in the former mining town of Sungai Lembing. Just north of the Tin Museum is a "hanging bridge" (jambatan bergantung). Access is via a narrow, winding road at the base of the entrance to the Tin Museum. There is another hanging bridge on the outskirts of Sungai Lembing town (visible from the main road, on the right side). There is a Panorama Hill which provides an impressive pre-dawn view. On the Kuantan-Sungai Lembing road at the hamlet of Pancing, there is a limestone mountain which houses a large reclining Buddha in one of its caves, Charah Cave. The highest peak, Gunung Tapis, also can be accessed from here.

=== Theme parks ===
Bukit Gambang Resort City (BGRC) is one of the largest water theme park resorts in Malaysia, spanning 547 acres and offering a 17.1-acre lake, and a 24,000-square-foot wave pool. Bukit Gambang Safari Park, the biggest safari in east coast of Peninsular Malaysia.

== Kuantan 188 ==
Kuantan 188
- Menara Kuantan 188
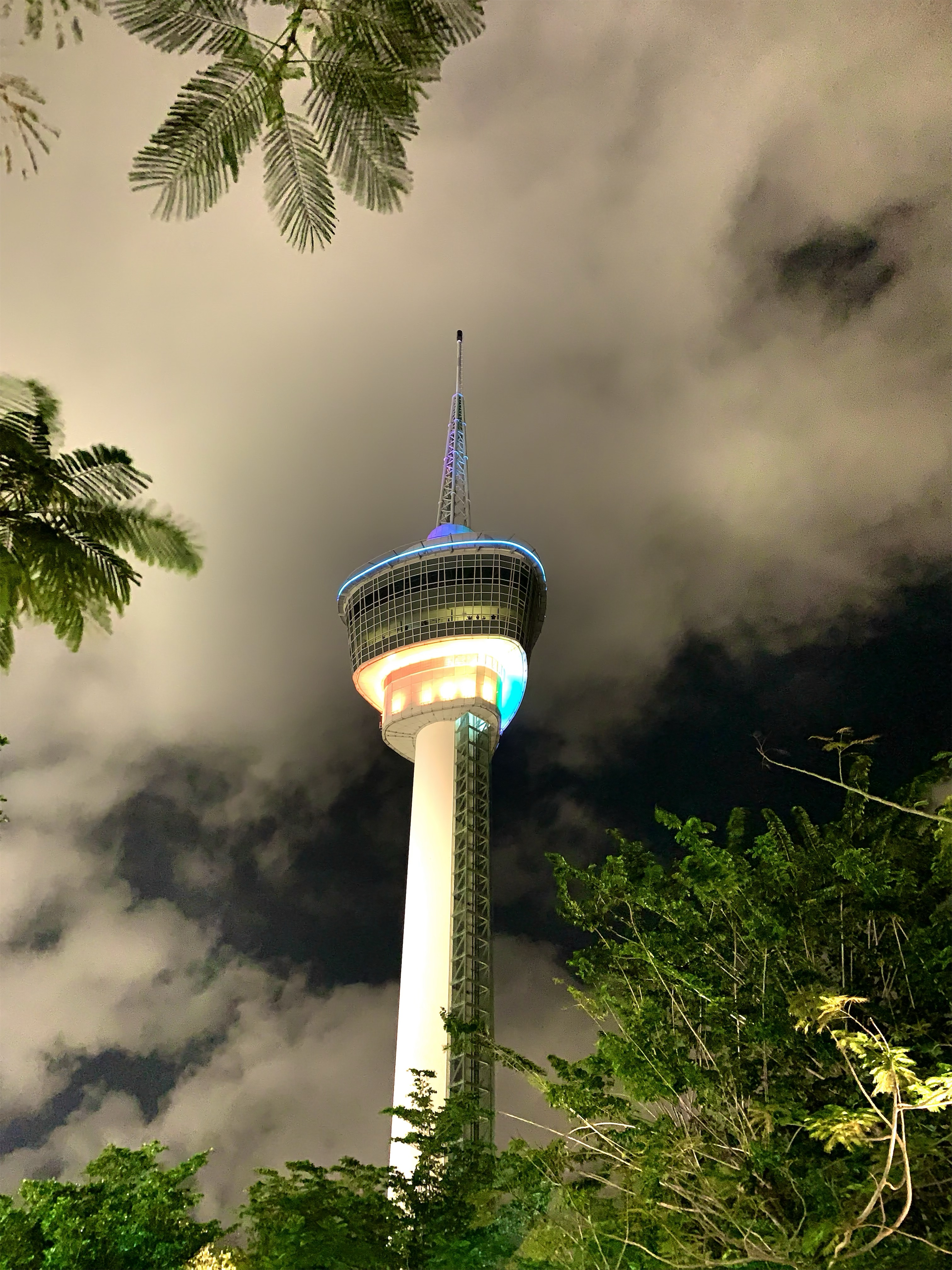
- Kuantan 188 at night.
- Former names: Teruntum Tower

Record height
- Tallest in Pahang from 2019 to 2023^{[I]}
- Preceded by: First World Hotel Tower 1 & 2
- Surpassed by: Grand Ion Majestic

General information
- Status: Completed
- Type: Observation tower
- Architectural style: Teruntum Putih (Lumnitzera Racemosa) / Pahang's coat of arms
- Location: Kuantan River, Kuantan, Malaysia
- Coordinates: 3°48′14″N 103°19′39″E
- Construction started: August 2017
- Completed: 3 September 2019
- Opening: 15 December 2020
- Inaugurated: 21 February 2021
- Cost: RM 4405.0000 million ($10 million USD)
- Owner: East Coast Economic Region Development Council (ECERDC) Pahang State Government

Height
- Antenna spire: 188 m (617 ft)
- Roof: 124 m (407 ft)
- Top floor: 104 m (341 ft)
- Observatory: 92 m (302 ft)

Technical details
- Structural system: Steel; Reinforced concrete
- Floor count: 3

Design and construction
- Architect: Neoformation Architects Sdn. Bhd.
- Developer: East Coast Economic Region Development Council (ECERDC) Pahang State Government
- Structural engineer: Pembinaan Purcon Sdn. Bhd.

Website
- www.kuantan188.com.my

Kuantan 188, previously known as Teruntum Tower is a 3-storey, 188-meter-tall tower in Kuantan, Pahang, Malaysia. It is the Malaysia's second tallest tower after the Kuala Lumpur Tower and the second-tallest in East Coast Economic Region after the newly completed Grand Ion Majestic in Genting Highlands, which is Pahang's tallest building. Its construction was started in August 2017 and completed on 3 September 2019. It features an observation deck at 92 meters high, a restaurant at 98 meters high and an open sky-deck at 104 meters high. The tower offers a 360-degree view of the Kuantan River and Kuantan City.

=== Design and concept ===
The design of the tower was inspired by spear head which is one of element on the Pahang's Coat of Arms while the tower's porch inspired by Lumnitzera Tree.

There are also some symbolic concepts behind the tower's design:

- The tower's porch symbolizes the diversity of the people of Kuantan and Pahang.
- Five connected steel post of the spire represent five principles of the Rukun Negara as the core of people's unity. It also represent the five Pillars of Islam.
- Golden tower's pinnacle symbolizes the sovereignty of the Sultan of Pahang.

=== Inauguration ===
Kuantan 188 was official inaugurated on 21 February 2021 by the Yang di-Pertuan Agong Al-Sultan Abdullah (who also is the Sultan of Pahang) via video footage played on a giant screen during the event. The tower opened as new iconic landmark for the new proclaimed city of Kuantan. It expected to revitalise the state tourism sector by attracting thousands of tourists to the city.

Al-Sultan Abdullah was represented by his heir, the regent of Pahang Crown Prince Tengku Hassanal Ibrahim Alam Shah alongside of his other sons, Tengku Muhammad Iskandar Ri'ayatuddin Shah and Tengku Ahmad Ismail Mu'adzam Shah. Other honorable guests including the Chief Minister of Pahang Wan Rosdy Wan Ismail, Senior Minister of Infrastructure Development Fadillah Yusof, then Minister of Communications and Multimedia Saifuddin Abdullah, Speaker of the Pahang State Legislative Assembly Ishak Muhamad, Pahang State Government Secretary Salehuddin Ishak, Mayor of Kuantan City Hamdan Hussin and other members of federal cabinet and Pahang State Government.

During the event, the honorable guests also witnessed a boat parade by the federal government, state government, local authorities and defense forces along the Kuantan River.

== Tallest structures in Kuantan ==
Apart from Kuantan Tower 188 which is iconic in the middle of the city center, there are several tall buildings around Kuantan City.

Rank	Name	Height	Floor	Function	Area	Notes
1	Kuantan 188	188 m	3	Observation tower	City centre	Second tallest structure in Malaysia
2	Swiss-Bellhotel & Imperium Residence	120 m	28	Hotel & Residential	Tanjung Lumpur	Tallest building in Kuantan
3	The Zenith Hotel Kuantan	95 m	24	Hotel	City centre	Tallest building in Kuantan (2007-2021)
4	Teruntum Complex	87.5 m	22	Mall	City centre	Tallest building in Kuantan (1979-2007)
5	Mahkota Valley	70 m	16	Residential	Bandar Indera Mahkota	
6	Shahzan Hotel	70 m	16	Hotel	City centre	
7	Timurbay Seafront Residence Suite	68 m	15	Residential	Sungai Karang	
8	Grand Darul Makmur Hotel	62 m	13	Hotel	City Centre	
9	TNB Kuantan	58 m	13	Office	City centre	
10	Menara CDO	52 m	13	Office	Taman Teratai	
11	Wisma Persekutuan	50 m	12	Office	City centre	Tallest building in Kuantan (1979)
12	Kompleks Tun Razak	50 m	13	Office	Bandar Indera Mahkota	
13	E-Red Hotel	49 m	13	Hotel	City centre	
14	CIMB Bank Kuantan	49 m	13	Bank	City centre	
15	Kuantan City Council	49 m	13	Office	City centre	
16	Grand Continental Hotel	45 m	12	Hotel	City centre	
17	IPK Pahang Building (PDRM PAHANG)	45 m	10	Office	City centre	
18	PPRS Pinggiran Putra	45 m	11	Apartment Building	Pinggiran Putra	
19	Tengku Ampuan Afzan Hospital	45 m	10	Hospital	City centre	
20	Cathayana Hotel	45 m	8	Hotel	City centre	
21	KPJ Pahang Specialist Hospital	40 m	9	Hospital	Tanjung Lumpur	
22	Wisma Sri Pahang	40 m	9	Government Building	City centre	
23	Tokio Marine	39 m	8	Office	City centre	
24	AC Hotel by Marriott Kuantan	39 m	7	Hotel	City centre	

== Culture ==
=== Cuisine ===
Kuantan is famous among locals and tourists for its fish crackers (called keropok in Malay) and salted fish, where the fish are marinated mainly with salt and left out to dry in the sun for days and sold at the market, Serambi Teruntum in Tanjung Lumpur. Fresh grilled fish or ikan bakar can be purchased at Tanjung Lumpur and Beserah area mostly located near fishermen's village.

Many types of local food can be found at the city centre.

Very popular and sold by street vendors (especially at the night markets) are varieties of satay which consists of grilled meat on a stick which is dipped into peanut sauce and roti canai, a thick flatbread dipped in a dhal curry sauce.

Typical ethnic Indian dishes include the naan and tandoori chicken.

== Healthcare ==
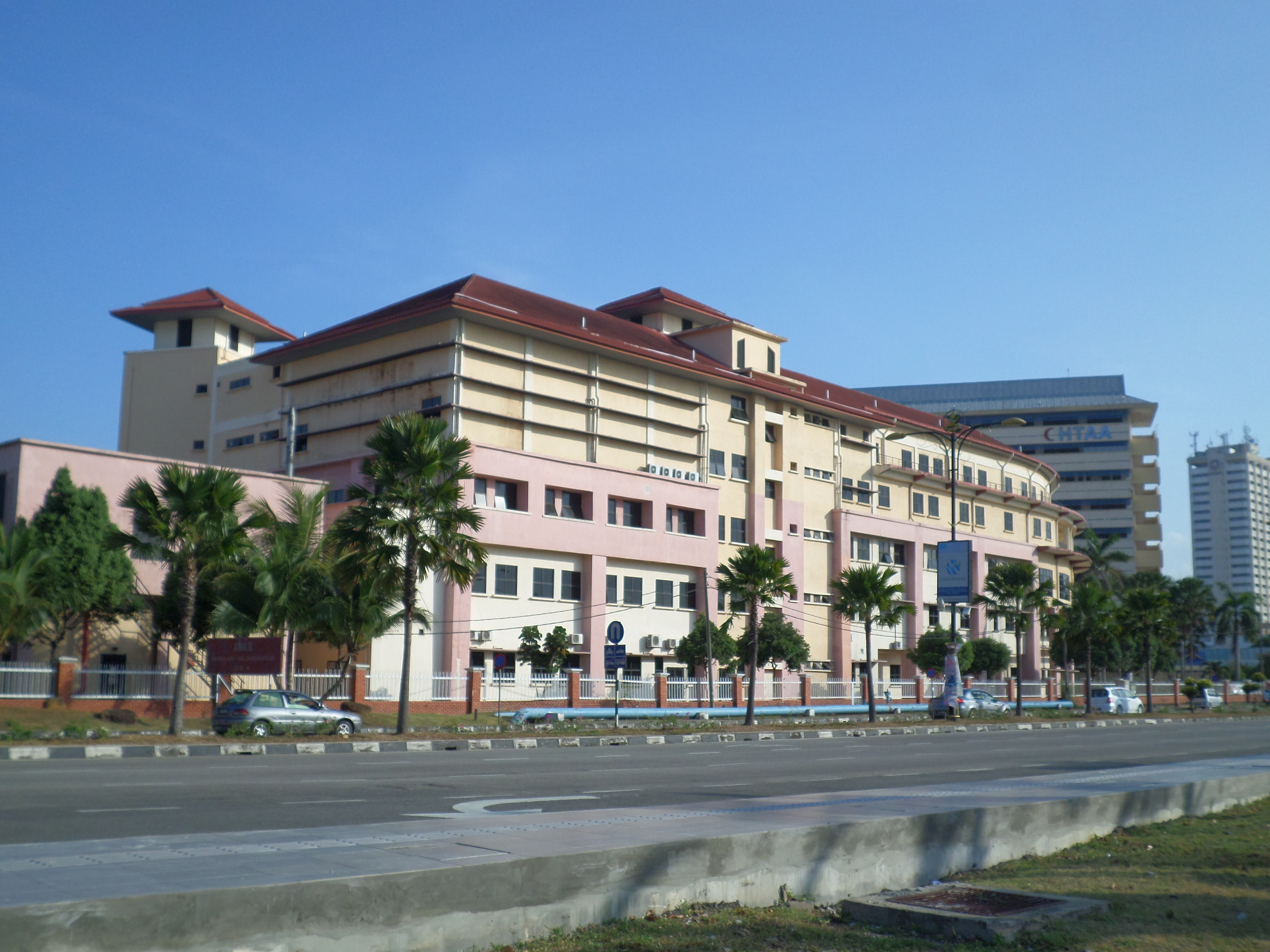
Tengku Ampuan Afzan Hospital.

Medical needs are served by several hospitals and clinics. The main hospital is Tengku Ampuan Afzan Hospital, which is equipped with state-of-the-art equipment such as a CT scanner and MRI.

In Indera Mahkota, there are the International Islamic University Medical Center International Islamic University Malaysia.

There are several private medical centres operate in city: KPJ Pahang Specialist Hospital, Kuantan Medical Center (KMC), Hospital Pakar PRK Muip, KCDC Hospital and Darul Makmur Medical Center.

A Community Health Centre serves suburbs such as Beserah, while smaller clinics are in smaller suburbs such as Bandar Indera Mahkota.

== Education ==
=== Higher education ===
There are many institutes of higher learning in Kuantan. They are categorised as Institut Pengajian Tinggi Awam (IPTA); public university or Institut Pengajian Tinggi Swasta (IPTS); private university. Two of the public institutes in Kuantan is Politeknik Sultan Ahmad Shah (POLISAS) & Politeknik METrO Kuantan (PMKu). POLISAS established in 1976 and PMKu established on 1 April 2011.

The International Islamic University Malaysia (IIUM), which is a branch from the main campus in Gombak. There are two IIUM campuses in Kuantan. The Jalan Hospital campus (JHC) campus that opened on year 1997 and the 1,000 acres (4.0 km^{2}) Indera Mahkota campus on year 2004. IIUM Kuantan focuses on medical related degree programmes offered through several faculties or Kulliyyahs such as: Kulliyyah of Medicine, Kulliyyah of Pharmacy, Kulliyyah of Allied Health Sciences (Radiography, Optometry, Dietetics, Audiology, Physiology and Biomedical Science), Kulliyyah of Nursing, and Kulliyyah of Science (Biotechnology, Computational and Theoritical Sciences (CTS), Applied Chemistry, Physics, Marine Science, Plant Science, and Applied Plant Science), Kulliyyah of Dentistry.

The Jalan Hospital campus (JHC) campus houses the notable IIUM Breast Centre, a centre devoted to the research and diagnosis of breast cancer.

Kolej Komuniti Kuantan was founded in 2001 and currently operating at a permanent campus in Bandar Indera Mahkota.

The Universiti Malaysia Pahang (UMP) was founded in 2002 and located in Gambang. UMP offers undergraduates and postgraduates education mainly in engineering and technical fields through its 7 faculties and centre. UMP has a newly built main campus in Pekan.

==== Private colleges and institutes ====
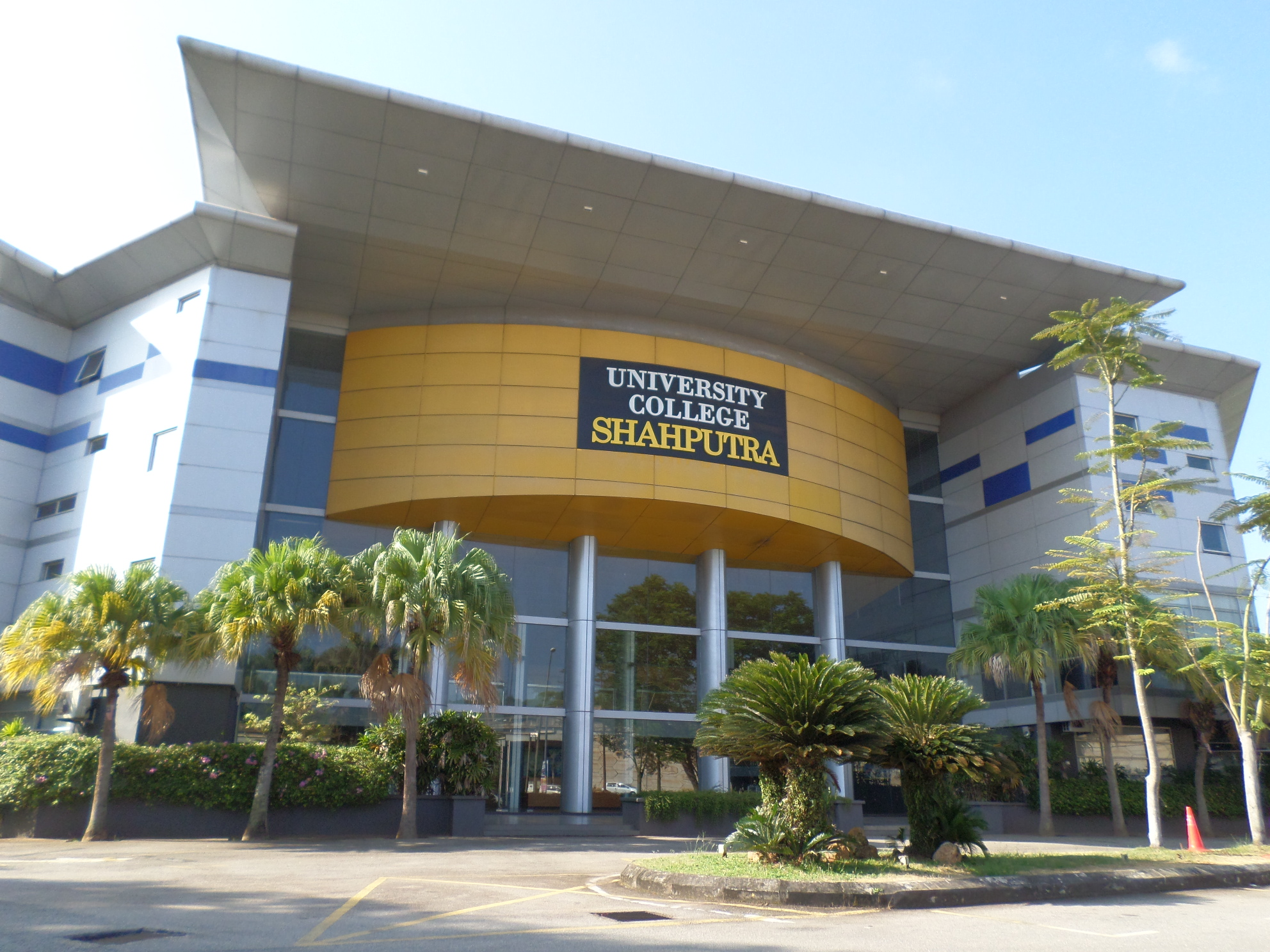
Widad University College.

- International Islamic University Malaysia (IIUM)
- Tunku Abdul Rahman University College
- Open University Malaysia (OUM)
- Universiti Islam Pahang Sultan Haji Ahmad Shah (UniPSAS)
- Widad University College
- Kolej Yayasan Pahang
- Kolej Poly-Tech MARA
- Kolej Matrikulasi Pahang (KMPh)
- Institut ECMA
- Institut Latihan Perindustrian Kuantan (ILP Kuantan)
- Institut Teknologi MIDAS
- Institut Saga
- Kolej Kemahiran Tinggi MARA (KKTM)
- Kolej Komuniti Paya Besar, Gambang
- Kolej Professional Mara Indera Mahkota
- Kolej PSDC
- Kolej Teknologi Cosmopoint
- Malaysian Aviation Training Academy (MATA Aviation)

=== Secondary schools ===
Secondary school (high school) education is provided by Sekolah Menengah Kebangsaan (National Secondary School) (e.g., SMK Air Putih), Sekolah Menengah Jenis Kebangsaan (National-type School) Chinese primary schools and Religious schools (e.g., SMA Al-Ihsan). All follow the syllabus and curriculum provided and regulated by the Malaysian Ministry of Education (Kementerian Pendidikan Malaysia).

Alternatives to national education are provided by international schools which follow international curriculums such as Cambridge and US Common Core. This includes Regent International School (Cambridge) and the International School of Kuantan (US Common Core), grades K to 12.

== Transportation ==
=== Land ===
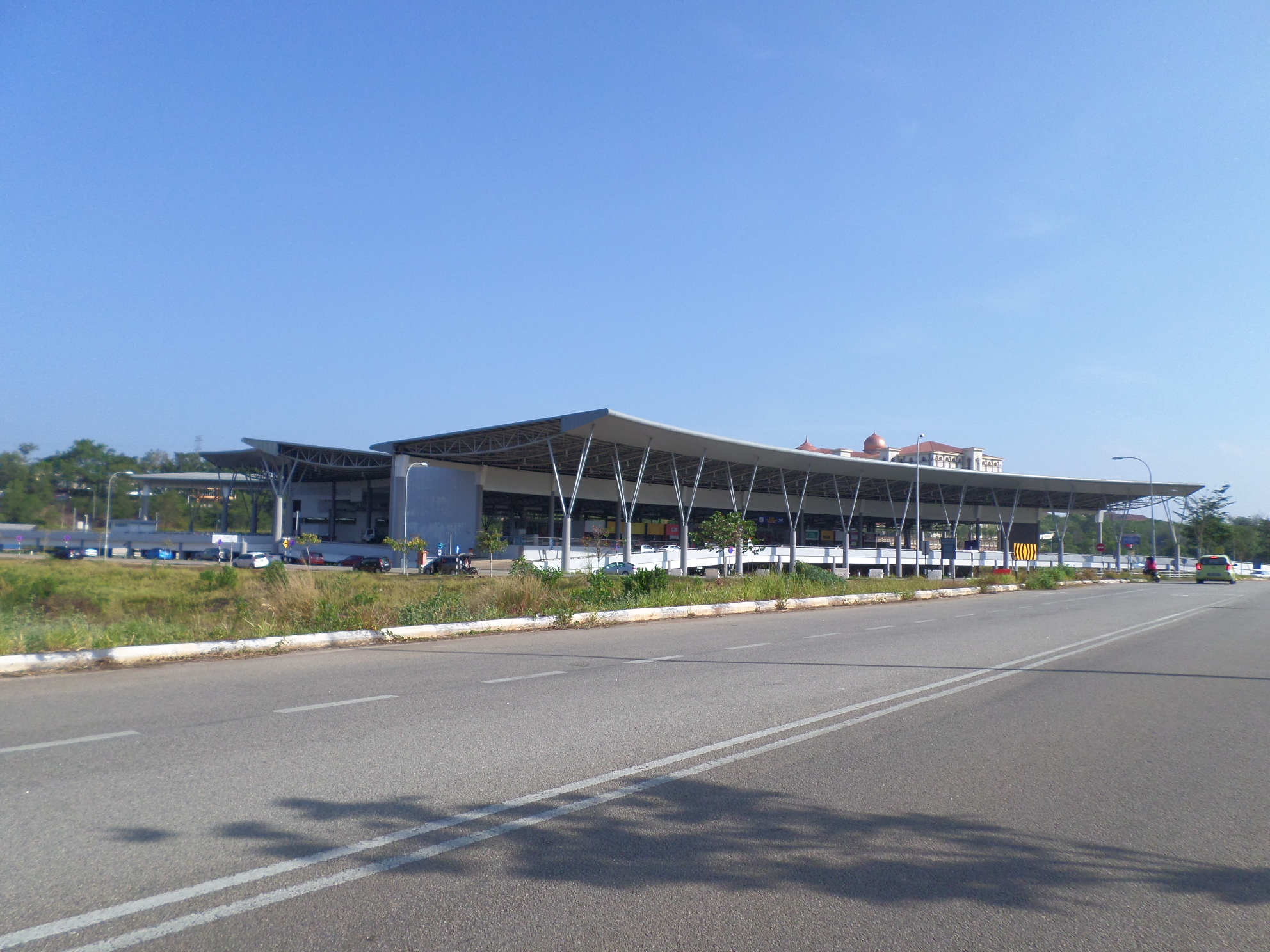
Kuantan Sentral Terminal.

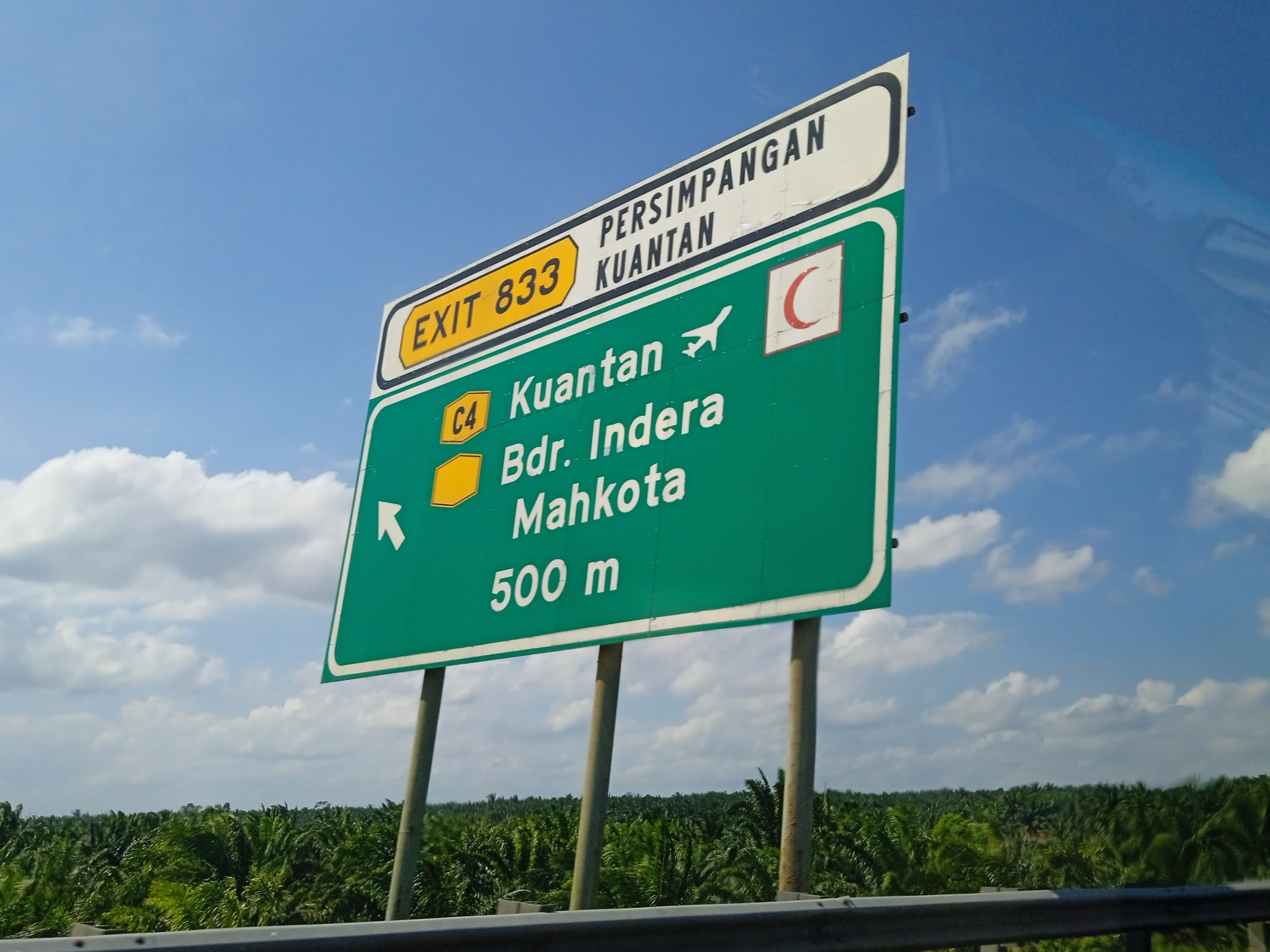
Kuantan Interchange at East Coast Expressway

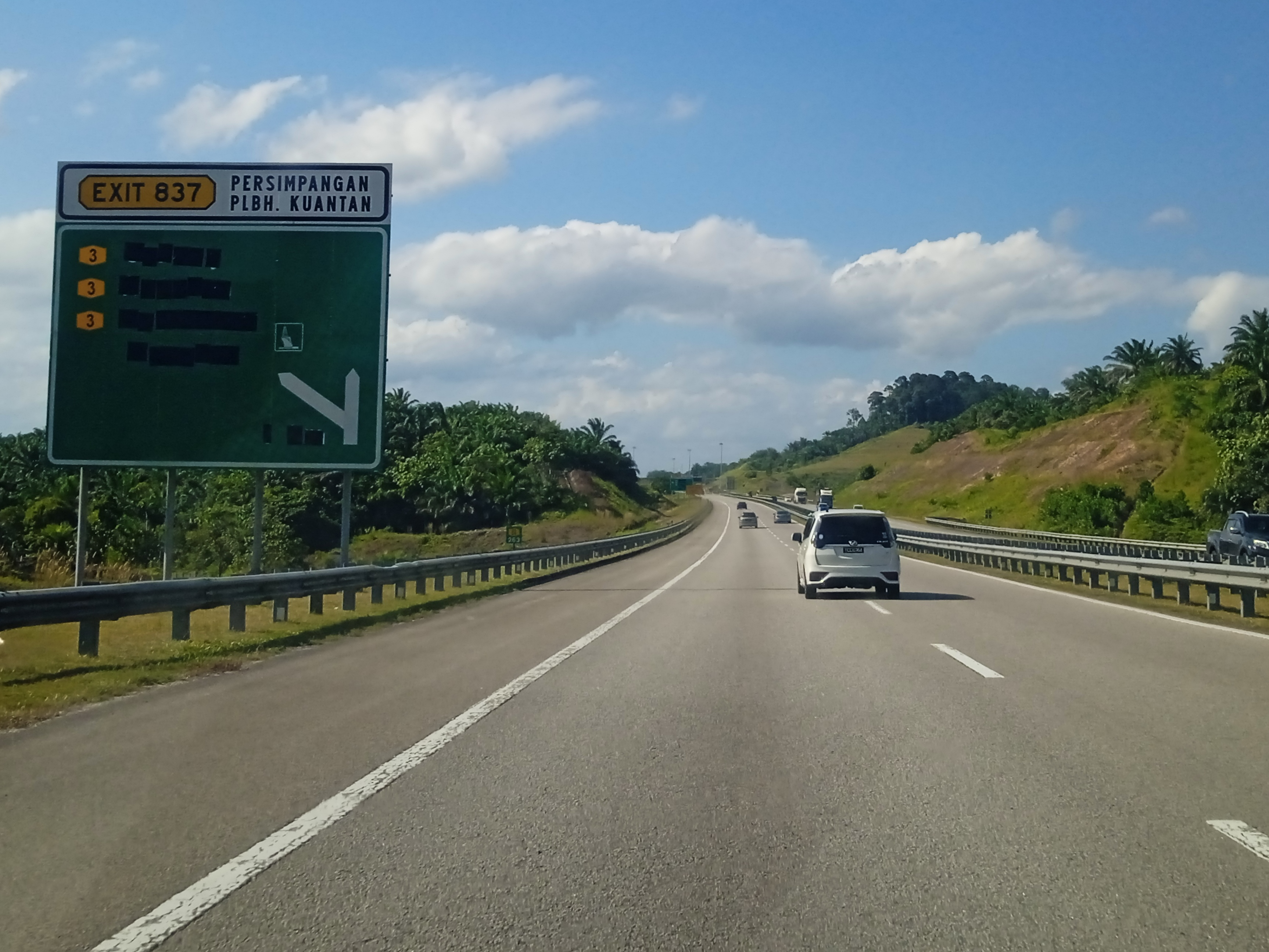
East Coast Expressway towards Pelabuhan Kuantan Interchange

Kuantan is connected to Kuala Lumpur via the East Coast Expressway and Karak Expressway. Kuantan is now more accessible by road transportation than before, primarily because of the opening of East Coast Expressway. The East Coast Expressway, which begins in Gombak, Selangor and ends near Kuala Terengganu, also links Kuantan to other major towns in Pahang.

Besides Kuala Terengganu and Kota Bharu, the other two capitals of the east coast, the scenic coastal road (Federal Route 3) also runs southward through Pekan, Kuala Rompin, Mersing before terminating in Johor Bahru just before the interchange to Singapore. This route winds through verdant forests and small coastal towns, and a stretch of quiet beaches at Rompin and Lanjut. Alternatively, Tun Razak Highway Federal Route 12 that runs from the town of Segamat, Johor to Gambang and proceeding to Gambang-Kuantan Highway Federal Route 2 also connects Kuantan with Johor Bahru.

Kuantan Bypass is a highway that runs from Kuantan Port to Kuantan Airport. Interchange are available at Bandar Indera Mahkota, Bandar Damansara Kuantan, East Coast Expressway, Jerangau Highway Federal Route 14, Semambu and major roads.

Alternatively, express buses to Kuantan depart from Kuala Lumpur. Tickets for these buses are available from Hentian Pekeliling or Terminal Bersepadu Selatan (TBS) in Kuala Lumpur. These express buses will stop at the Terminal Kuantan Sentral at Bandar Indera Mahkota. There's local bus services stationed at the bus stop in Kuantan General Market near the Darul Makmur Stadium. This station provides services to Cherating, Pekan and nearby destinations. RapidKuantan buses are accessible to most places in Kuantan even from Pekan, the neighbouring town and from Kemaman in Terengganu. The main stop centre of RapidKuantan is near the General Market (Pasar Besar) and the Darul Makmur Stadium.

=== Rail ===
The upcoming MRL East Coast Rail Link, connecting Kota Bharu and Port Klang, will serve the city. The line is expected to enter operation by 2027.

=== Air ===
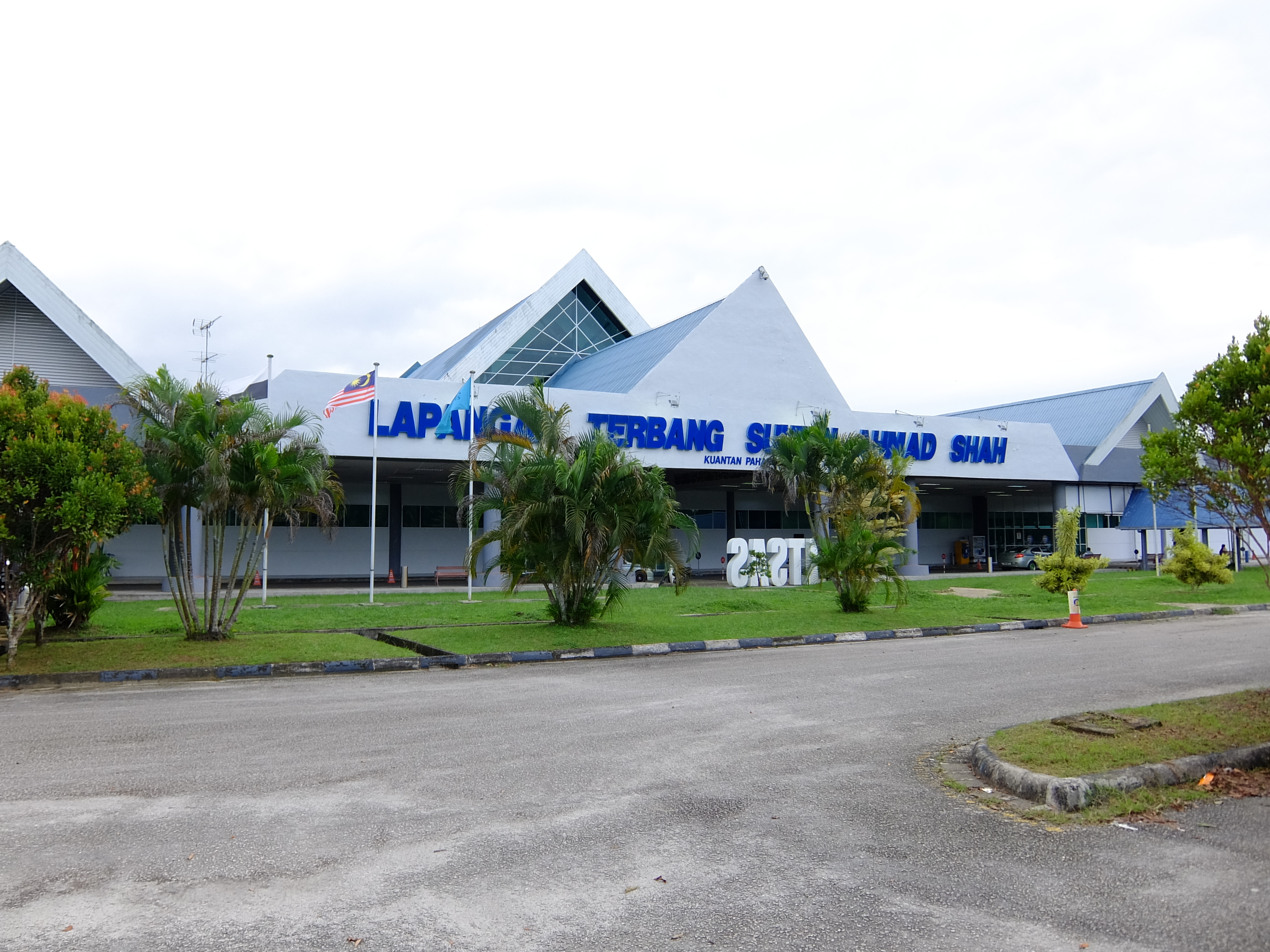
Sultan Haji Ahmad Shah Airport.

Kuantan is served by Sultan Haji Ahmad Shah Airport. This is the only airport in Pahang State that is controlled by Malaysia Airport Bhd. Currently, the airlines that fly to Kuantan: Malaysia Airline System (MAS), Firefly, Scoot, Malindo and AirAsia. Firefly has scheduled direct flights to Singapore and Penang. In 2009, the airport handled 226,912 passengers on 3,110 flights, though the airport is able to handle over one million passengers annually. In 2008, Taiwan and Tourism Malaysia had co-operated that there were 23 charter flights directly from Taipei to Kuantan Airport, this condition had made Kuantan Sultan Ahmad Shah Airport the first airport in East Coast of Peninsular Malaysia that received international flights. Passengers have to walk from the plane to the arrival hall. Planes from Kuantan fly directly to KLIA, Subang Airport, Singapore Changi Airport and Penang International Airport. Seasonal flights to Taipei are operated by China Airlines. Royal Malaysian Air Force, also operates from the nearby RMAF Kuantan.

=== Sea ===
Kuantan Port, an all-weather port is a multi-cargo seaport facing South China Sea. New Deep Water Terminal (NDWT) is currently being developed adjacent to the port. Upon completion, Kuantan Port is envisaged to be the main gateway to China and the Far East. The port is part of the 21st Century Maritime Silk Road.

== In popular culture ==
- Kuantan features prominently in the first part of Nevil Shute's 1949 novel A Town Like Alice
- Kuantan is mentioned in the Command & Conquer video game series backstory as being a major base of operations of the Brotherhood of Nod.
- Box-office success local movie "Woohoo"(2010) was shot at Beserah, Kuantan.
- In "Polis Evo 2", the fictional place "Bongsun" is located in Kuantan, where this place is a shooting location.
- Famous social responsibility site, KCPbantu is based in Kuantan.
- Kuantan is mentioned in the 42nd episode of anime Jujutsu Kaisen as Kento Nanami's preferred place of retirement; it trended on international social media soon after the episode aired and the popularity is acknowledged by the Pahang State's Communications and Media Exco Fadzli Mohamad Kamal in a post on Facebook on the same day.

== International relations ==
=== Sister cities ===
Kuantan currently has one sister city:

- Qinzhou, China.
