= Rapid Kuantan =

Former bus services in Kuantan, Malaysia

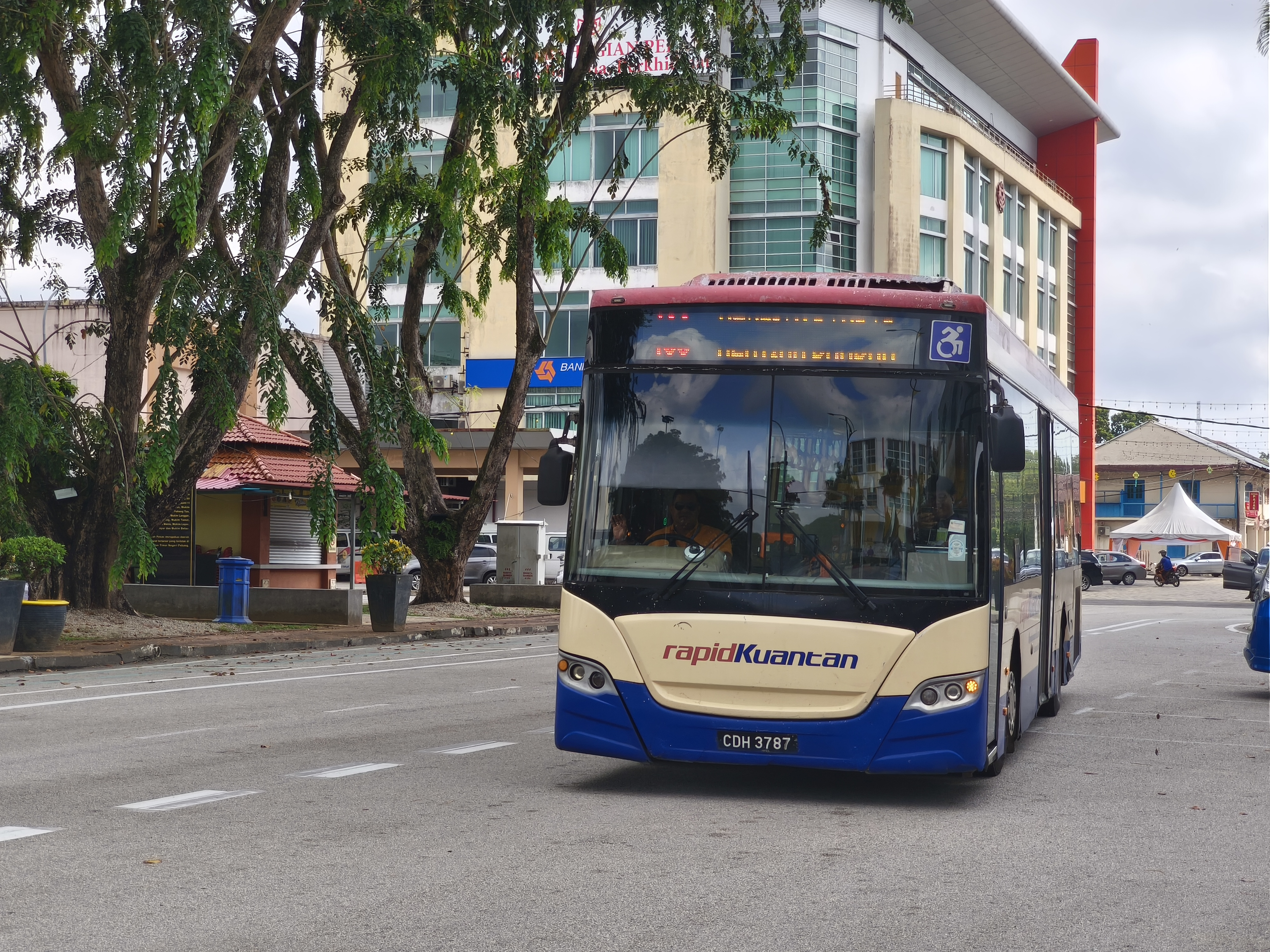
- Rapid Kuantan in Pekan
- Parent: Prasarana Malaysia
- Commenced operation: 1 December 2012
- Ceased operation: 14 December 2025
- Headquarters: Kuantan, Pahang, Malaysia
- Service type: Bus service
- Routes: 16 bus routes
- Fleet: 80 Scania K250UB &K270UB
- Daily ridership: 2,399 (Q1 2025)
- Annual ridership: 975,677 (2024)
- Website: myrapid.com.my/bus-train/rapid-kuantan/

Rapid Kuantan (styled as rapidKuantan) was a corporate brand owned by Prasarana Malaysia Berhad (Prasarana) to operate stage bus services in Kuantan, Pahang, Malaysia. It was launched on 1 December 2012.

It has a fleet of 80 Scania K series buses and operates a total of 16 routes.

The operating hours and fares of Rapid Kuantan's bus service are every day from 6 a.m. to 11 p.m. The bus fare varies depending on the payment method chosen. The cash fare is RM2.00 for one zone and RM4.00 for two zones. Alternatively, cashless payments will receive a 10% discount until further notice. Concession cardholders can also save 50% off the cash fare.

All bus services under Rapid Kuantan were discontinued on 14 December 2025. They were replaced with stage bus services operated by Sanwa Tours under the Stage Bus Service Transformation programme, which commenced operations on 15 December 2025.

All buses were later sent back to Kuala Lumpur and redecorated to join into the Rapid KL Bus fleet.

== Routes ==
Up until its discontinuation, Rapid Kuantan operated 16 bus routes connecting Kuantan to its surrounding outskirts and districts, such as Pekan and Sungai Lembing.

Route number	Origin	Destination	Service type	Operator	Notes
100	Hentian Bandar	Gambang Resort	Trunk	Rapid Kuantan	
101	Hentian Bandar	Inderapura / Indera Sempurna	Trunk	Rapid Kuantan	
102	Hentian Bandar	Permatang Badak	Trunk	Rapid Kuantan	
200	Hentian Bandar	Teluk Cempedak	Trunk	Rapid Kuantan	
300	Hentian Bandar	Taman Impian	Trunk	Rapid Kuantan	
301	Hentian Bandar	Bukit Sagu	Trunk	Rapid Kuantan	
302	Hentian Bandar	Indera Mahkota 1	Trunk	Rapid Kuantan	
303	Hentian Bandar	Terminal Sentral Kuantan	Trunk	Rapid Kuantan	
400	Hentian Bandar	Pekan	Trunk	Rapid Kuantan	
401	Hentian Bandar	Kuala Pahang	Trunk	Rapid Kuantan	
402	Hentian Bandar	SMK Sungai Soi	Trunk	Rapid Kuantan	
500	Hentian Bandar	Sungai Lembing	Trunk	Rapid Kuantan	
600	Hentian Bandar	RTC Balok Makmur	Trunk	Rapid Kuantan	
601	Hentian Bandar	Kolej Polisas	Trunk	Rapid Kuantan	
603	Hentian Bandar	Kolej PSDC	Trunk	Rapid Kuantan	
604	Balok Makmur	Cherating	Trunk	Rapid Kuantan	

=== Defunct routes ===
These were the former routes that have been discontinued by Rapid Kuantan.

Route number	Origin	Destination	Service type	Operator	Notes
103	Hentian Bandar	Gugusan Felda Sg. Panching	Trunk	Rapid Kuantan	
T201	Hentian Bandar	Pusat Bandaraya Kuantan	Trunk	Rapid Kuantan	City Shuttle route.
201	Hentian Bandar	Taman Gelora	Trunk	Rapid Kuantan	
602	Hentian Bandar	Balok Makmur	Trunk	Rapid Kuantan	Via Kuantan Bypass.

== See also ==
- Prasarana Malaysia Berhad
  - Rapid Bus Sdn Bhd
    - Rapid KL
      - BRT Sunway Line
      - BRT Federal Line
    - Rapid Penang
    - Rapid Kuantan
- Land Public Transport Agency
- Public transport in Kuala Lumpur
- Buses in Kuala Lumpur
