= Terminal Sentral Kuantan =

Coordinates: 3.82906°N 103.2806099°E

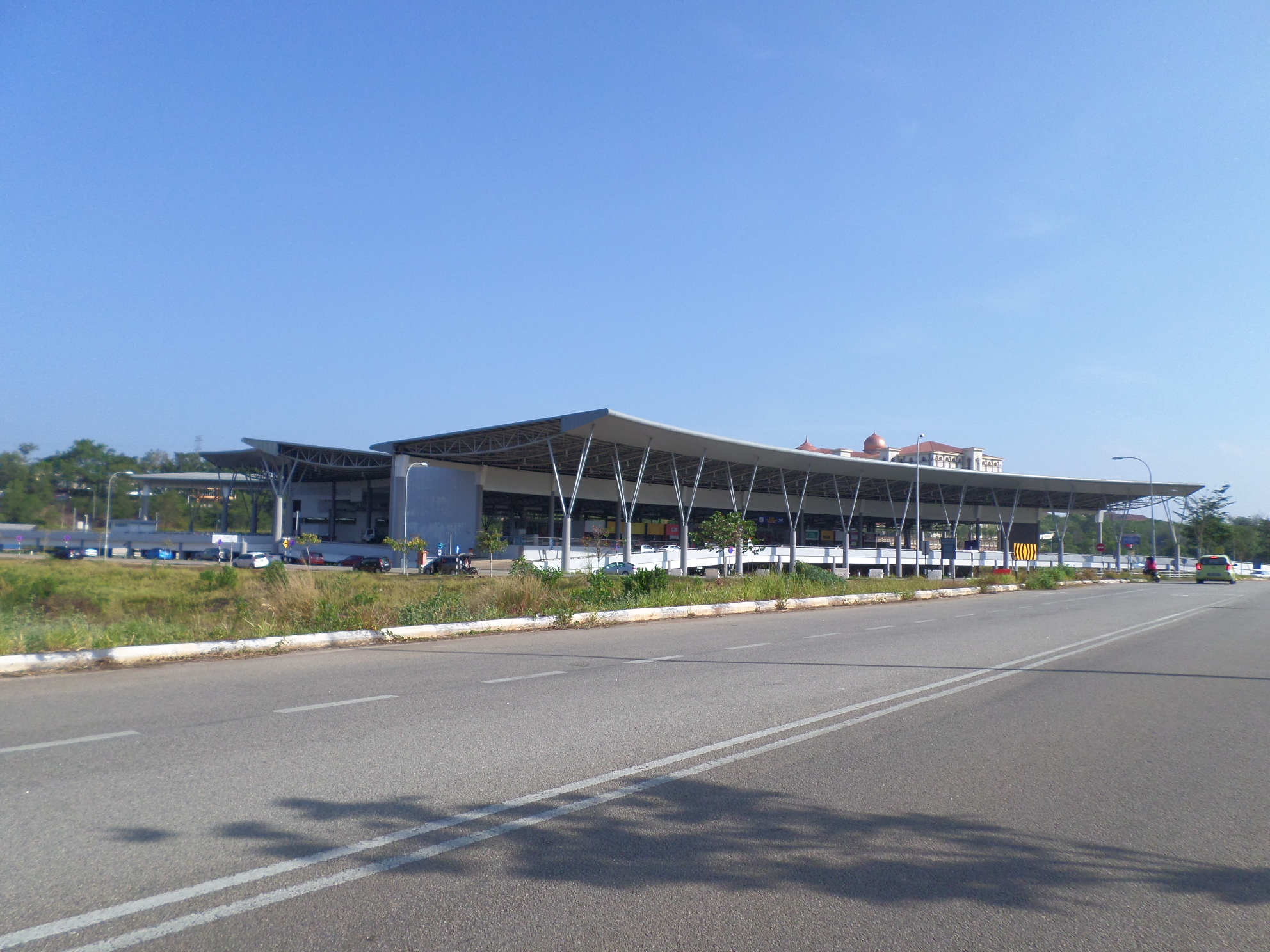

General information
- Location: Bandar Indera Mahkota, Kuantan, Pahang, Malaysia
- Platforms: 18 Platforms

Construction
- Platform levels: 2 Levels
- Parking: Basement parking for passengers

Other information
- Website: https://www.terminalsentralkuantan.my/

History
- Opened: 1 August 2013
Location

Terminal Sentral Kuantan (Kuantan Central Terminal) is a public transportation terminal in Kuantan, Pahang, Malaysia. It is located at Bandar Indera Mahkota. The terminal is the largest public transportation terminal on the East Coast of Peninsular Malaysia.

Rapid Kuantan route 303 plying between this terminal and intracity bus terminal, Hentian Bas Bandar Kuantan at city center, which serves almost all Rapid Kuantan routes. Bus frequency is between 15–20 minutes from 6.00 Am to 11.00 PM.

== Bus serving at this terminal ==
- Rapid Kuantan
- Transnasional
- Cepat Ekspress
- Plusliner
- Sani Ekspress
- SP Bumi
- Bas Kesatuan
- Nice
- Etika Ekspress
- Utama Ekspress

== See also ==
- Transport in Malaysia
