= Widad University College =

College in Kuantan, Pahang, Malaysia

Coordinates: 3.8239°N 103.2799°E

- Kolej Universiti Widad
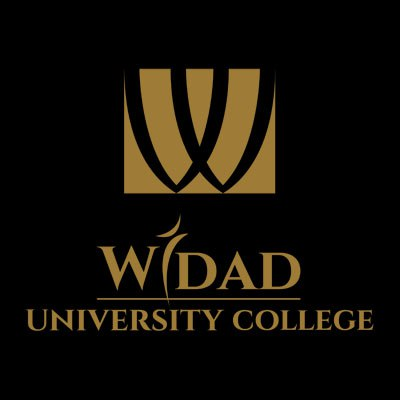
- Type: Private
- Established: 1997
- Location: BIM Point, Bandar Indera Mahkota 25200 Kuantan, Pahang Darul Makmur, Malaysia, Kuantan, Pahang, Malaysia
- Website: www.widad.edu.my

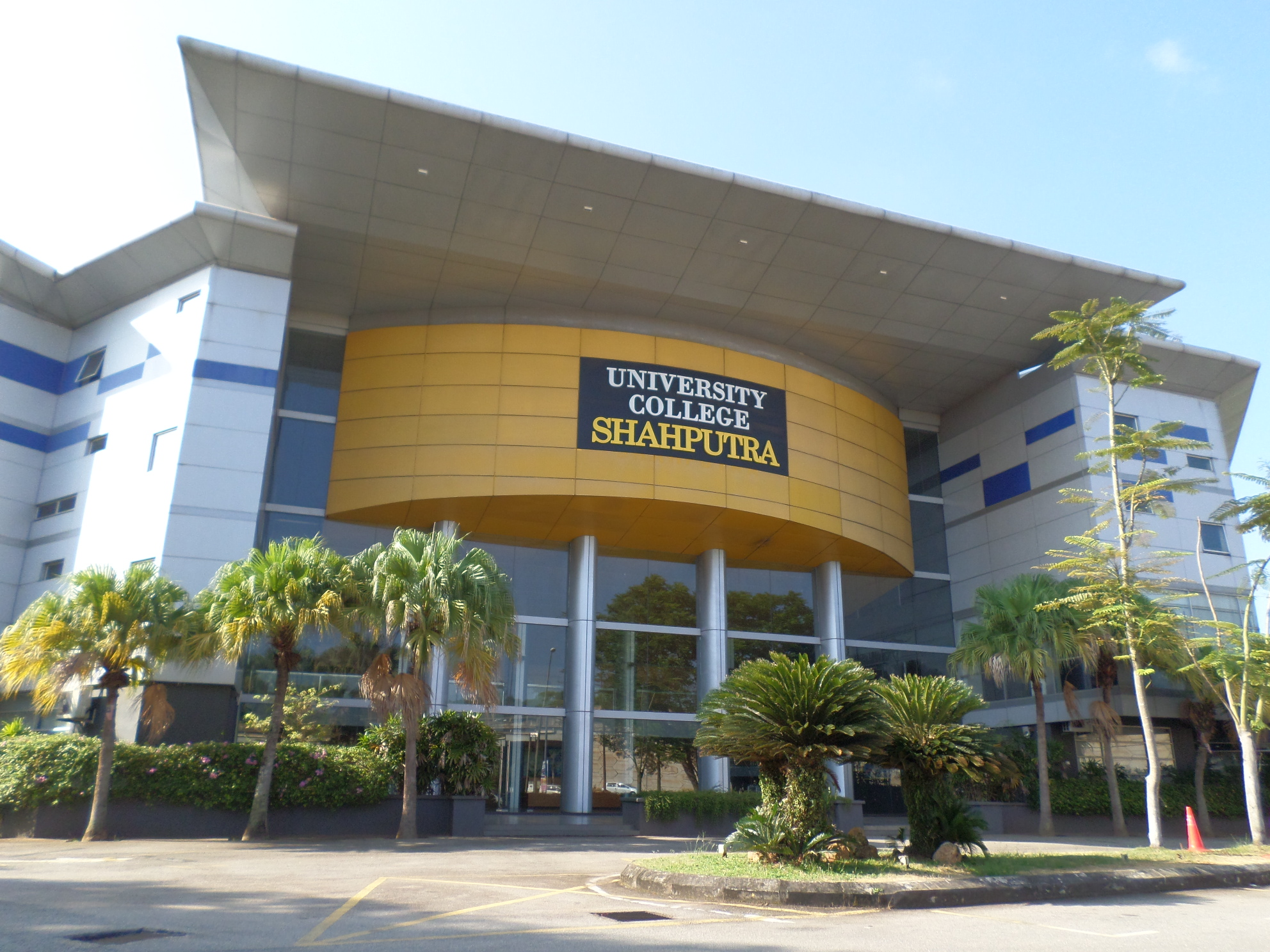
Widad University College

Widad University College (Malay: Kolej Universiti Widad) is a private university college in Malaysia. Located in Kuantan, Pahang, it was previously known as University College Shahputra (UCSA).

The institution has established research centers in various fields, including engineering, business, and hospitality.

== History ==
Widad University College, formerly known as University College Shahputra, was originally established with the opening of the Institute Fitra on December 24, 1997. This institution was owned by a private Bumiputera company called Shahputra Education Sdn Bhd.

The initial groups of students included TESL and Accounting Matriculates, who were registered in June 1998. Following an increase in the number of students, Institute Fitra moved to a 8-hectare plot located in Pekan, Pahang.

In mid-2016, University College Shahputra and Kolej Shahputra were renamed as Widad University College and Widad College respectively.

Seri Paduka Baginda Yang di-Pertuan Agong Tuanku Abdul Halim Mua'dzam Shah was appointed as the first chancellor of Widad University College on September 9, 2016. The inauguration ceremony was held in Istana Negara, Kuala Lumpur.

== Faculties ==
The institution offers undergraduate, postgraduate, and doctorate programs in various fields of study, which have been approved by the Malaysian Qualifications Agency.

- Faculty of Medicine
- Faculty of Business and Management
- Faculty of Education & Social Sciences
- Faculty of Information & Interactive Technology
- Faculty of Nursing
- Faculty of Allied Health Sciences
- Faculty of Sport Studies

Additionally, they offer collaborative diploma programs with Universiti Teknologi MARA and Universiti Teknologi Malaysia in fields such as Tourism Management, Communication & Media, and Architecture.
