= Tanjung Sepat =

Tanjung Sepat may refer to:

- Tanjung Sepat, Pahang in Malaysia
- Tanjung Sepat, Selangor in Malaysia
  - Tanjong Sepat (state constituency) of Selangor, Malaysia
