= Sungai Pandan Waterfall =

Waterfall in Pahang, Malaysia

- Air Terjun Sungai Pandan
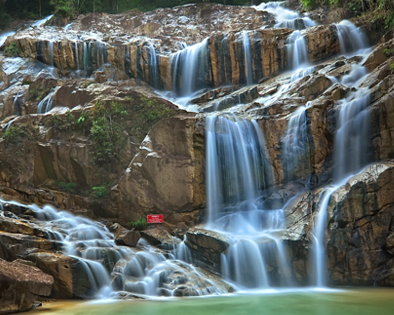
- Sungai Pandan Waterfall
- Interactive map of Sungai Pandan Waterfall
- Location: Kuantan, Pahang, Malaysia
- Coordinates: 3°47′23″N 103°08′31″E

Sungai Pandan Waterfall (Malay: Air Terjun Sungai Pandan) located 25 km from Kuantan town at Felda Panching Selatan Pahang, Malaysia.

== Facilities ==
- Surau
- Paved road
- Parking area
- Toilet
- Suspension bridge
- Trails
- BBQ

== See also ==
- Geography of Malaysia
