= Dong (state constituency) =

Political subdivision in Malaysia

Dong (N08)
Pahang constituency

State constituency
- Legislature: Pahang State Legislative Assembly
MLA
Fadzli Mohamad Kamal
BN
- Constituency created: 1959
- First contested: 1959
- Last contested: 2022

Demographics
- Electors (2022): 17,052

Dong is a state constituency in Pahang, Malaysia, that has been represented in the Pahang State Legislative Assembly.

== Demographics ==
Ethnic breakdown of Dong's electorate as of 2022
1. Malay (79.1%)
2. Chinese (14.1%)
3. Other ethnicities (4.23%)
4. Indian (2.59%)

== History ==
=== Polling districts ===
According to the federal gazette issued on 31 October 2022, the Dong constituency is divided into 11 polling districts.

State constituency	Polling district	Code	Location
Dong（N08）	Pamah Rawas	080/08/01	SK Ulu Dong
Dong（N08）	Pamah Kulat	080/08/02	SK Pamah Kulat
Dong（N08）	Jeram	080/08/03	SJK (C) Sungak Klau
Dong（N08）	FELDA Lembah Klau	080/08/04	SK LKTP Lembah Klau
Dong（N08）	FELDA Krau	080/08/05	SK LKTP Krau 1
Dong（N08）	Gali Tengah	080/08/06	SK Gali
Dong（N08）	Gali Hilir	080/08/07	Dewan Serbaguna Kampung Gali Hilir
Dong（N08）	Durian Sebatang	080/08/08	Balai Raya Durian Sebatang
Dong（N08）	Kampung Temau	080/08/09	SK Temau
Dong（N08）	Pekan Dong	080/08/10	SMK Dong
Dong（N08）	Tanjung Putus	080/08/11	SK Tanjung Putus

=== Representation history ===
Members of the Legislative Assembly for Dong
Assembly	No	Years	Name	Party
Constituency created
1st	N02	1959-1964	Che Yeop Sendiri Hussin	Alliance (UMNO)
2nd	N02	1964-1969	Che Yeop Sendiri Hussin	Alliance (UMNO)
		1969-1971	Assembly dissolved	
3rd	N02	1971-1973	Che Yeop Sendiri Hussin	Alliance (UMNO)
3rd	N02	1973-1974	Che Yeop Sendiri Hussin	BN (UMNO)
4th	N15	1974-1978	Tengku Mustapha Tengku Seti	BN (UMNO)
5th	N15	1978-1982	Tengku Mustapha Tengku Seti	BN (UMNO)
6th	N15	1982-1986	Tengku Mustapha Tengku Seti	BN (UMNO)
7th	N08	1986-1990	Abdul Rahman Che Yeop Sendiri	BN (UMNO)
8th	N08	1990-1995	Abdul Rahman Che Yeop Sendiri	BN (UMNO)
9th	N08	1995-1999	Shahiruddin Ab Moin	BN (UMNO)
10th	N08	1999-2004	Shahiruddin Ab Moin	BN (UMNO)
11th	N08	2004-2008	Shahiruddin Ab Moin	BN (UMNO)
12th	N08	2008-2013	Shahiruddin Ab Moin	BN (UMNO)
13th	N08	2013-2018	Shahiruddin Ab Moin	BN (UMNO)
14th	N08	2018-2022	Shahiruddin Ab Moin	BN (UMNO)
15th	N08	2022–present	Fadzli Mohamad Kamal	BN (UMNO)

== Election results ==
Pahang state election, 2022
Party	Candidate	Votes	%	∆%
BN	Fadzli Mohamad Kamal	6,142	45.34	▼4.96
PN	Tengku Shah Amir Tengku Perang	5,096	37.62	▲37.62
PH	Mohammuid Abdul Jhawaad Abdul Ghaffar	2,309	17.04	▲17.04
Total valid votes		13,547	100.00	
Total rejected ballots		145		
Unreturned ballots		33		
Turnout		13,725	80.49	▼2.91
Registered electors		17,052		
Majority		1,046	7.72	▼20.38
BN hold		Swing		

Pahang state election, 2018
Party	Candidate	Votes	%	∆%
BN	Shahiruddin Ab Moin	6,294	56.71	▲4.96
PAS	Bedu Rahim Ismail	2,462	22.18	▼26.07
PKR	Hamzah Jaaffar	2,342	21.10	▲21.10
Total valid votes		11,098	100.00	
Total rejected ballots		210		
Unreturned ballots		54		
Turnout		11,362	83.40	▼0.23
Registered electors		13,623		
Majority		3,832	28.10	▲24.60
BN hold		Swing		

Pahang state election, 2013
Party	Candidate	Votes	%	∆%
BN	Shahiruddin Ab Moin	7,093	51.75	▼12.41
PAS	Tengku Shah Amir Tengku Perang	6,612	48.25	▲48.25
Total valid votes		13,705	100.00	
Total rejected ballots		306		
Unreturned ballots		29		
Turnout		14,040	84.01	▲8.62
Registered electors		16,713		
Majority		481	3.51	▼28.47
BN hold		Swing		

Pahang state election, 2008
Party	Candidate	Votes	%	∆%
BN	Shahiruddin Ab Moin	6,804	64.16	▼10.73
PKR	Kamaludin Abdul Rahman	3,413	32.19	▲32.19
Independent	Tengku Yusop Tengku Adbdul Hamid	387	3.65	▲3.65
Total valid votes		10,604	100.00	
Total rejected ballots		319		
Unreturned ballots		33		
Turnout		10,956	75.38	▲0.82
Registered electors		14,534		
Majority		3,391	31.98	▼17.80
BN hold		Swing		

Pahang state election, 2004
Party	Candidate	Votes	%	∆%
BN	Shahiruddin Ab Moin	7,791	74.89	▲11.83
PAS	Ahmad Kamal Alang	2,612	25.11	▼11.83
Total valid votes		10,403	100.00	
Total rejected ballots		287		
Unreturned ballots		19		
Turnout		10,709	74.56	▲3.36
Registered electors		14,363		
Majority		5,179	49.78	▲23.66
BN hold		Swing		

Pahang state election, 1999
Party	Candidate	Votes	%	∆%
BN	Shahiruddin Ab Moin	5,609	63.06	▼21.39
PAS	Solahuddin Shamsuddin	3,286	36.94	▲36.94
Total valid votes		8,895	100.00	
Total rejected ballots		348		
Unreturned ballots		27		
Turnout		9,270	71.20	▼0.85
Registered electors		13,019		
Majority		2,323	26.12	▼42.78
BN hold		Swing		

Pahang state election, 1995
Party	Candidate	Votes	%	∆%
BN	Shahiruddin Ab Moin	7,369	84.45	▲24.09
S46	Md Rusli Ab Jalil	1,357	15.55	▼24.09
Total valid votes		8,726	100.00	
Total rejected ballots		269		
Unreturned ballots		0		
Turnout		8,995	72.05	▼1.07
Registered electors		12,485		
Majority		6,012	68.90	▲48.18
BN hold		Swing		

Pahang state election, 1990
Party	Candidate	Votes	%	∆%
BN	Abdul Rahman Yeop Sendiri	5,025	60.36	▼2.27
S46	Md Rusli Ab Jalil	3,300	39.64	▲39.64
Total valid votes		8,325	100.00	
Total rejected ballots		426		
Unreturned ballots		1		
Turnout		8,752	73.12	▲0.45
Registered electors		11,970		
Majority		1,725	20.72	▼13.55
BN hold		Swing		

Pahang state election, 1986
Party	Candidate	Votes	%	∆%
BN	Abdul Rahman Yeop Sendiri	4,454	62.63	▲4.46
DAP	Ismail Mohamad	2,017	28.36	▼0.89
PAS	Sulaiman Hamid	641	9.01	▼3.57
Total valid votes		7,112	100.00	
Total rejected ballots		280		
Unreturned ballots		0		
Turnout		7,392	72.67	▼4.53
Registered electors		10,172		
Majority		2,437	34.27	▲5.36
BN hold		Swing		

Pahang state election, 1982
Party	Candidate	Votes	%
BN	Tengku Mustapha Tengku Seti	4,064	58.17
DAP	Chong Yoke Lee	2,044	29.25
PAS	Zaharin Muhamad	879	12.58
Total valid votes		6,987	100.00
Total rejected ballots		211	
Unreturned ballots		0	
Turnout		7,198	77.20
Registered electors		9,324	
Majority		2,020	28.91
BN hold		Swing	

Pahang state election, 1978
Party	Candidate	Votes	%	∆%
On the nomination day, Tengku Mustapha Tengku Seti won uncontested.
BN	Tengku Mustapha Tengku Seti			
Total valid votes				
Total rejected ballots				
Unreturned ballots				
Turnout				
Registered electors		8,231		
Majority				
BN hold		Swing		

Pahang state election, 1974
Party	Candidate	Votes	%	∆%
On the nomination day, Tengku Mustapha Tengku Seti won uncontested.
BN	Tengku Mustapha Tengku Seti			
Total valid votes				
Total rejected ballots				
Unreturned ballots				
Turnout				
Registered electors		7,167		
Majority				
BN gain from Alliance		Swing		-

Pahang state election, 1969
Party	Candidate	Votes	%	∆%
Alliance	Yeop Sendiri Hussin	3,353	55.36	▼25.77
PMIP	Tengku Kamarulzaman Tengku Abdul Hamid	1,090	18.00	▲18.00
Independent	Mohd Salleh Hassan	816	13.47	▲13.47
Independent	Abdul Moin Imam Labok	798	13.17	▲13.17
Total valid votes		6,057	100.00	
Total rejected ballots		96		
Unreturned ballots		0		
Turnout		6,153	67.22	▼16.40
Registered electors		9,153		
Majority		2,263	37.36	▼28.98
Alliance hold		Swing		

Pahang state election, 1964
Party	Candidate	Votes	%	∆%
Alliance	Yeop Sendiri Hussin	3,922	81.13	▲12.06
Socialist Front	Harun Sidek	715	14.79	▲14.79
Independent	Mohamed Sidek Norti	197	4.08	▲4.08
Total valid votes		4,834	100.00	
Total rejected ballots		346		
Unreturned ballots		0		
Turnout		5,180	83.62	▲3.41
Registered electors		6,195		
Majority		3,207	66.34	▲28.21
Alliance hold		Swing		

Pahang state election, 1959
Party	Candidate	Votes	%
Alliance	Yeop Sendiri Hussin	2,878	69.07
PMIP	Abdul Hamid Abdullah	1,289	30.93
Total valid votes		4,167	100.00
Total rejected ballots		120	
Unreturned ballots		0	
Turnout		4,287	80.21
Registered electors		5,345	
Majority		1,589	38.13
