= Sultan Ahmad Shah Mosque =

Mosque in Kuantan, Pahang, Malaysia

- Masjid Sultan Ahmad Shah
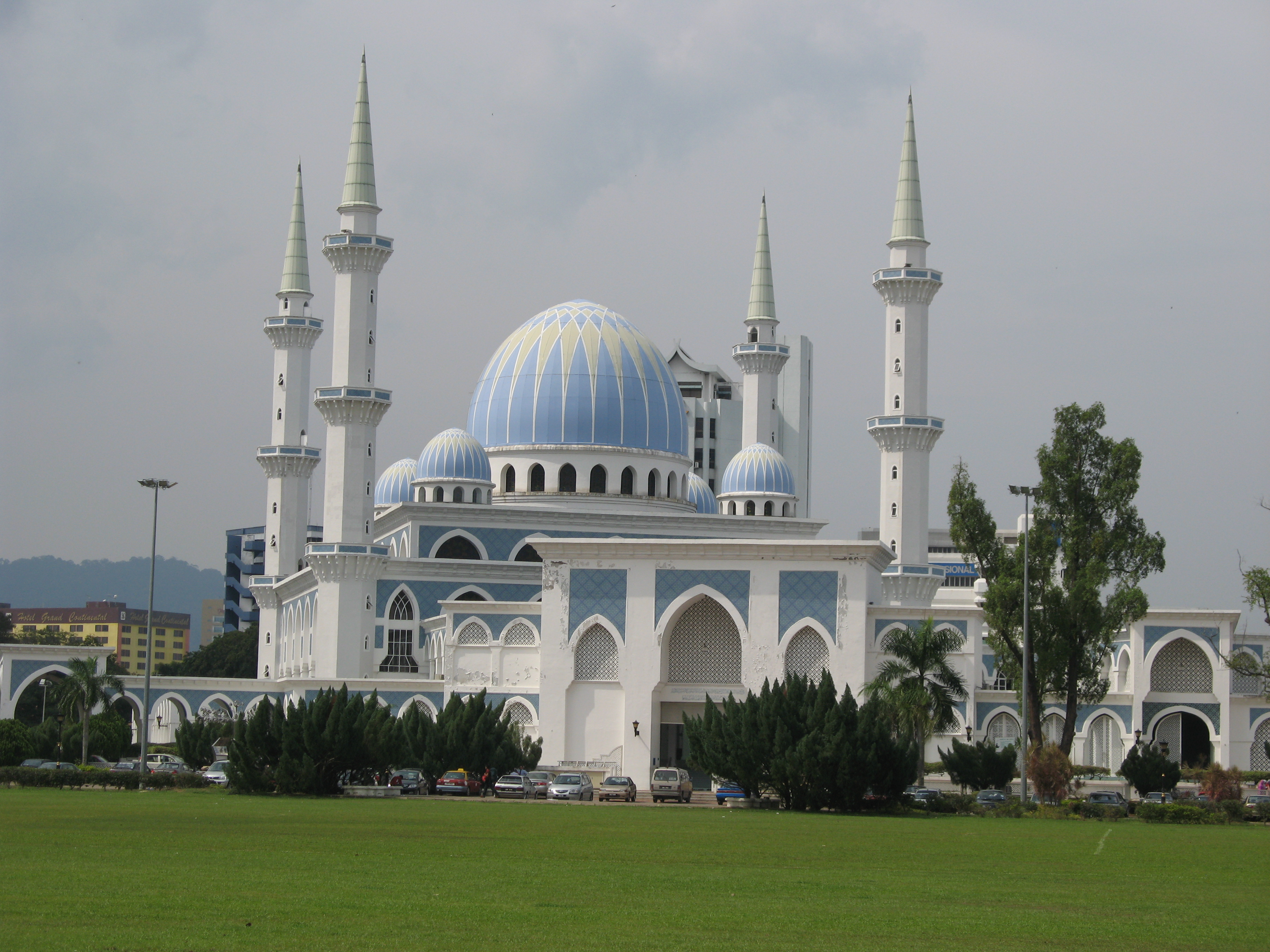

- Location within Pahang

Religion
- Affiliation: Islam
- Branch/tradition: Sunni

Location
- Location: Kuantan, Pahang, Malaysia
- Interactive map of Sultan Ahmad Shah Mosque
- Coordinates: 3.8080°N 103.3278°E

Architecture
- Architects: DZJ Architect and Associates
- Type: mosque
- Completed: 1993
- Minaret: 4

The Sultan Ahmad Shah Mosque (Malay: Masjid Sultan Ahmad Shah) is Pahang's state mosque. It is located in Kuantan, Pahang, Malaysia.

== History ==
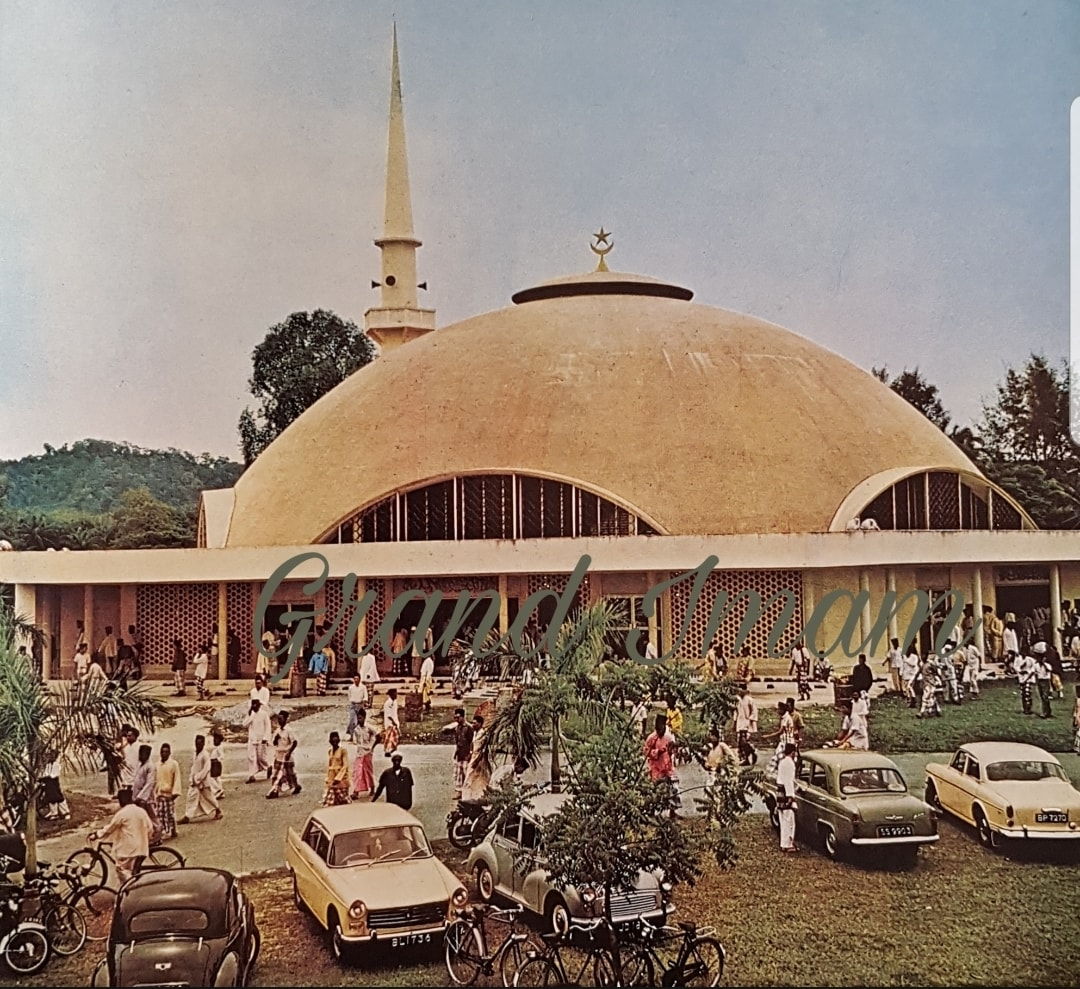
Old Pahang State Mosque.

It is named after the recorded Sultan Ahmad al-Mu’azzam Shah Ibni Almarhum Bendahara Sri Maharaja Tun Ali (23 May 1836 – 9 May 1914), who was the sixth Raja Bendahara of Pahang and the founder and first modern Sultan of Pahang that established Pahang's present regal family. On 28 August 1964, Sultan Abu Bakar Ri’ayatuddin Al-Mu’azzam Shah Ibni Al-Marhum Sultan Abdullah Al-Mu’tassim Billah Shah officially inaugurated the mosque.

The space-age design of old Sultan Ahmad 1 Mosque consisted of a big dome and a rocket-like minaret. It was built in 1962 to replace the old wooden one on Wall Street (now Mahkota Road). The mosque has an elaborate fifty-metre-diameter dome resting on a concrete ring above a curved concrete wall and columns. It was the most prominent geodesic dome house of worship in Pahang. Unfortunately, due to faulty design, this space-age mosque suffered from irreparable leakage during heavy rains. It was finally demolished in 1992 and a more Islamic-looking State Mosque was built in its place with new four minarets, a large dome, and a smaller dome, retaining the same name.

This new building was constructed between 1991 and 1993 by DZJ Architect and Associates. The great-grandson of Sultan Ahmad al-Mu’azzam Shah, Sultan Haji Ahmad Shah Al-Musta’in Billah ibni Almarhum Sultan Abu Bakar Ri’ayatuddin Al-Mu’azzam Shah, accompanied by former Imam at The Great Mosque of Mecca, Syaikh Muhammad bin Abdullah as-Sabil, officially marked the grand reopening of the Sultan Ahmad 1 Mosque on Friday, 21 October 1994. Tuan Haji Mohd Rizzal Bin Mohd Ali Nafiah is the current Grand Imam of the Sultan Ahmad 1 State Mosque since February 2023 after the former Grand Imam, Dato' Badli Shah Bin Alauddin, became Vice Mufti of Pahang.

== See also ==
- Islam in Malaysia
