= Fadzli Mohamad Kamal =

Malaysian politician

Yang Berhormat Tuan Fadzli Mohamad Kamal AMP MLA
- فضلي محمد كمال

Member of the Pahang State Executive Council (Communication and Multimedia, Youth, Sports and Non-governmental Organizations: since 14 December 2022) (Note: Assumed portfolios 12 days after taking office.)
- Incumbent
- Assumed office 2 December 2022
- Monarch: Abdullah
- Menteri Besar: Wan Rosdy Wan Ismail
- Preceded by: Mohammad Fakhruddin Mohd Ariff (Communication and Multimedia); Mohd Johari Hussain (Youth, Sports and Non-governmental Organizations)
- Constituency: Dong

Member of the Pahang State Legislative Assembly for Dong
- Incumbent
- Assumed office 19 November 2022
- Preceded by: Shahiruddin Ab Moin (BN–UMNO)
- Majority: 1,046 (2022)

Personal details
- Born: 18 March 1980 (age 46) Pahang, Malaysia
- Citizenship: Malaysian
- Party: United Malays National Organisation (UMNO)
- Other political affiliations: Barisan Nasional (BN)
- Occupation: Politician

Fadzli bin Mohamad Kamal is a Malaysian politician and served as Pahang State Executive Councillor since December 2022. He is the Member of the Pahang State Legislative Assembly (MLA) for Dong since November 2022. He is a member and the Deputy Division Chief of Raub of the United Malays National Organisation (UMNO), a component party of the BN coalition.

== Election results ==
Pahang State Legislative Assembly
Year	Constituency	Candidate	Votes	Pct	Opponent(s)	Votes	Pct	Ballots cast	Majority	Turnout
2022	N08 Dong	Fadzli Mohamad Kamal (UMNO)	6,142	45.34%	Tengku Shah Amir Tengku Perang (PAS)	5,096	37.62%	13,725	1,046	80.50%
2022	N08 Dong	Fadzli Mohamad Kamal (UMNO)	6,142	45.34%	Mohd Abd Jawaad Abd Ghafar (AMANAH)	2,309	17.04%	13,725	1,046	80.50%

== Honours ==
- Pahang
  - Member of the Order of the Crown of Pahang (AMP)
