= Shahiruddin Ab Moin =

Malaysian politician

Yang Berbahagia Dato' Sri Shahiruddin Ab Moin SSAP SIMP DSAP DIMP
- شاهرالدين بن عبدالموىٔين

Personal details
- Born: Pahang, Malaysia
- Citizenship: Malaysian
- Party: United Malays National Organisation (UMNO)
- Other political affiliations: Barisan Nasional (BN); Perikatan Nasional (PN); Muafakat Nasional (MN)
- Occupation: Politician

Shahiruddin bin Ab Moin is a Malaysian politician and served as Pahang State Executive Councillor.

== Election results ==
Pahang State Legislative Assembly
Year	Constituency	Candidate	Votes	Pct	Opponent(s)	Votes	Pct	Ballots cast	Majority	Turnout
1995	N08 Dong	Shahiruddin Ab Moin (UMNO)	7,369	84.45%	Md Rusli Ab Jalil (S46)	1,357	15.55%	8,995	6,012	72.05%
1999	N08 Dong	Shahiruddin Ab Moin (UMNO)	5,609	63.06%	Solahuddin Shamsuddin (PAS)	3,286	36.94%	9,270	2,323	71.20%
2004	N08 Dong	Shahiruddin Ab Moin (UMNO)	7,791	74.89%	Ahmad Kamal Alang (PAS)	2,612	25.11%	10,709	5,179	74.56%
2008	N08 Dong	Shahiruddin Ab Moin (UMNO)	6,804	64.16%	Kamaludin Abd Rahman (PKR)	3,413	32.19%	10,956	3,391	81.60%
2008	N08 Dong	Shahiruddin Ab Moin (UMNO)	6,804	64.16%	Tengku Yusop Tengku Abdul Hamid (IND)	387	3.65%	10,956	3,391	81.60%
2013	N08 Dong	Shahiruddin Ab Moin (UMNO)	7,093	51.75%	Tengku Shah Amir Tengku Perang (PAS)	6,612	48.25%	14,011	481	84.00%
2018	N08 Dong	Shahiruddin Ab Moin (UMNO)	6,294	56.71%	Bedu Rahim Ismail (PAS)	2,462	22.19%	11,362	3,832	83.40%
2018	N08 Dong	Shahiruddin Ab Moin (UMNO)	6,294	56.71%	Hamzah Jaaffar (AMANAH)	2,342	21.10%	11,362	3,832	83.40%

== Honours ==
- Pahang
  - Grand Knight of the Order of Sultan Ahmad Shah of Pahang (SSAP) – Dato' Sri (2014)
  - Grand Knight of the Order of the Crown of Pahang (SIMP) – formerly Dato', now Dato' Indera (2004)
  - Knight Companion of the Order of Sultan Ahmad Shah of Pahang (DSAP) – Dato' (2002)
  - Knight Companion of the Order of the Crown of Pahang (DIMP) – Dato' (1994)
