= Teluk Cempedak =

Beach in Malaysia

Coordinates: 3.8090°N 103.3728°E

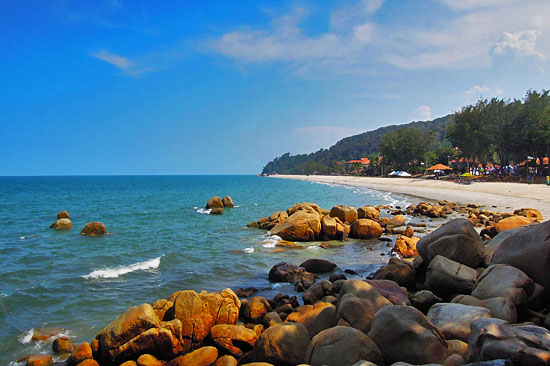
The Teluk Cempedak Beach in Kuantan.

Teluk Cempedak or Teluk Chempedak (literally : Cempedak Bay) also known as Palm Beach is a beach in Kuantan, Pahang, Malaysia. It is located 5 kilometres east from the town centre in Kuantan. The white sandy beach and casuarinas and pine trees line the coast, with some rocky promontories facing the South China Sea. The fishing village of Beserah is about 5 kilometres (3.1 miles) away.

== See also ==
- Cherating
- Tanjung Sepat, Pahang
- Batu Hitam
