= Batu Hitam =

Beach in Pahang, Malaysia

Coordinates: 3°52′06.4″N 103°22′06.4″E

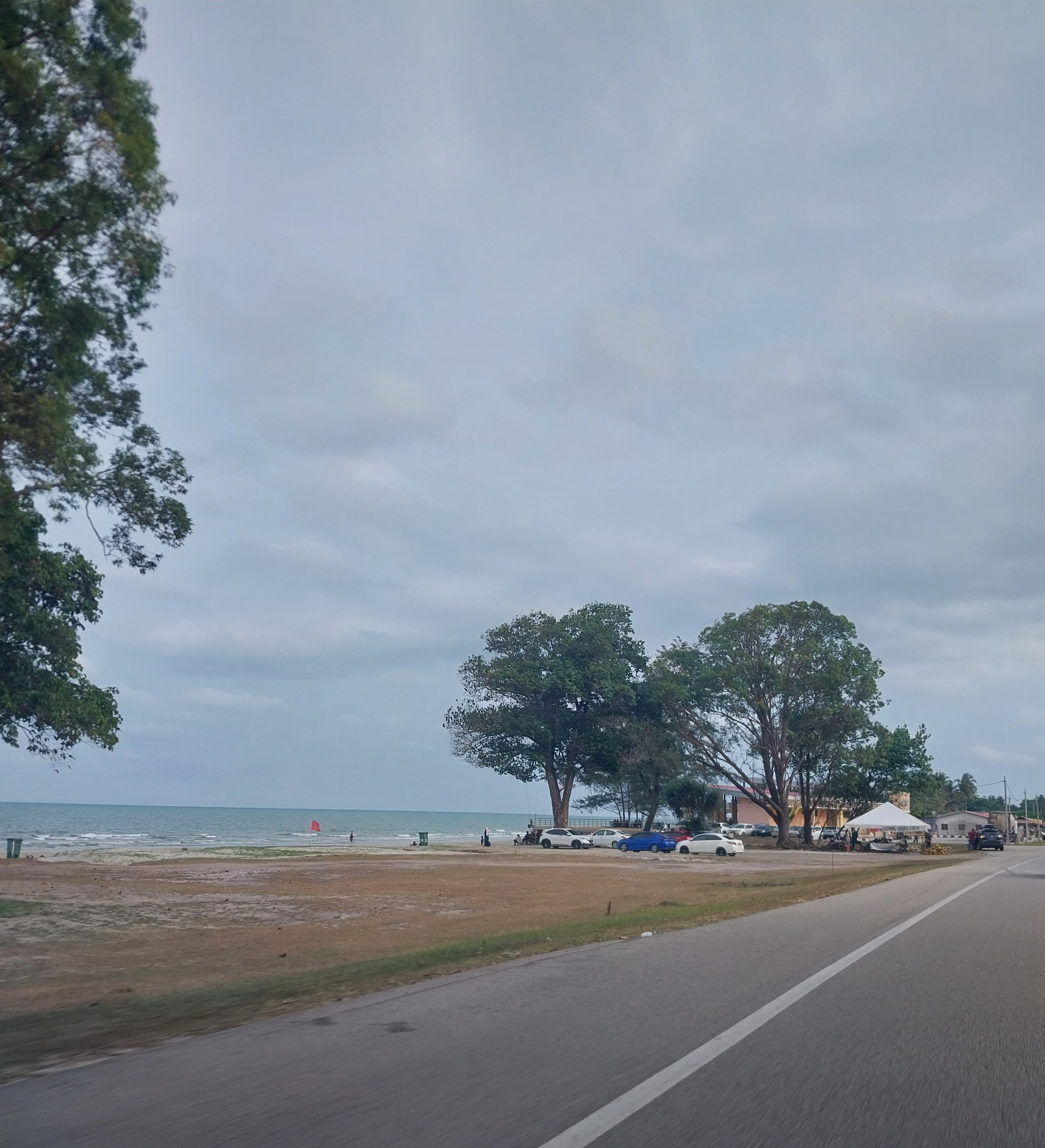
Batu Hitam beach.

Batu Hitam (literally: Black Stones) is a beach in Kuantan District, Pahang, Malaysia. It is called Batu Hitam for its stretch of black stones at the otherwise white sandy beach. Batu Hitam beach is a famous recreation place for both locals and visitors alike.

== See also ==
- Teluk Cempedak
- Cherating
- Tanjung Sepat, Pahang
