= Cherating =

Town in Kuantan District, Pahang, Malaysia

Coordinates: 4°07′45.4″N 103°23′13.1″E

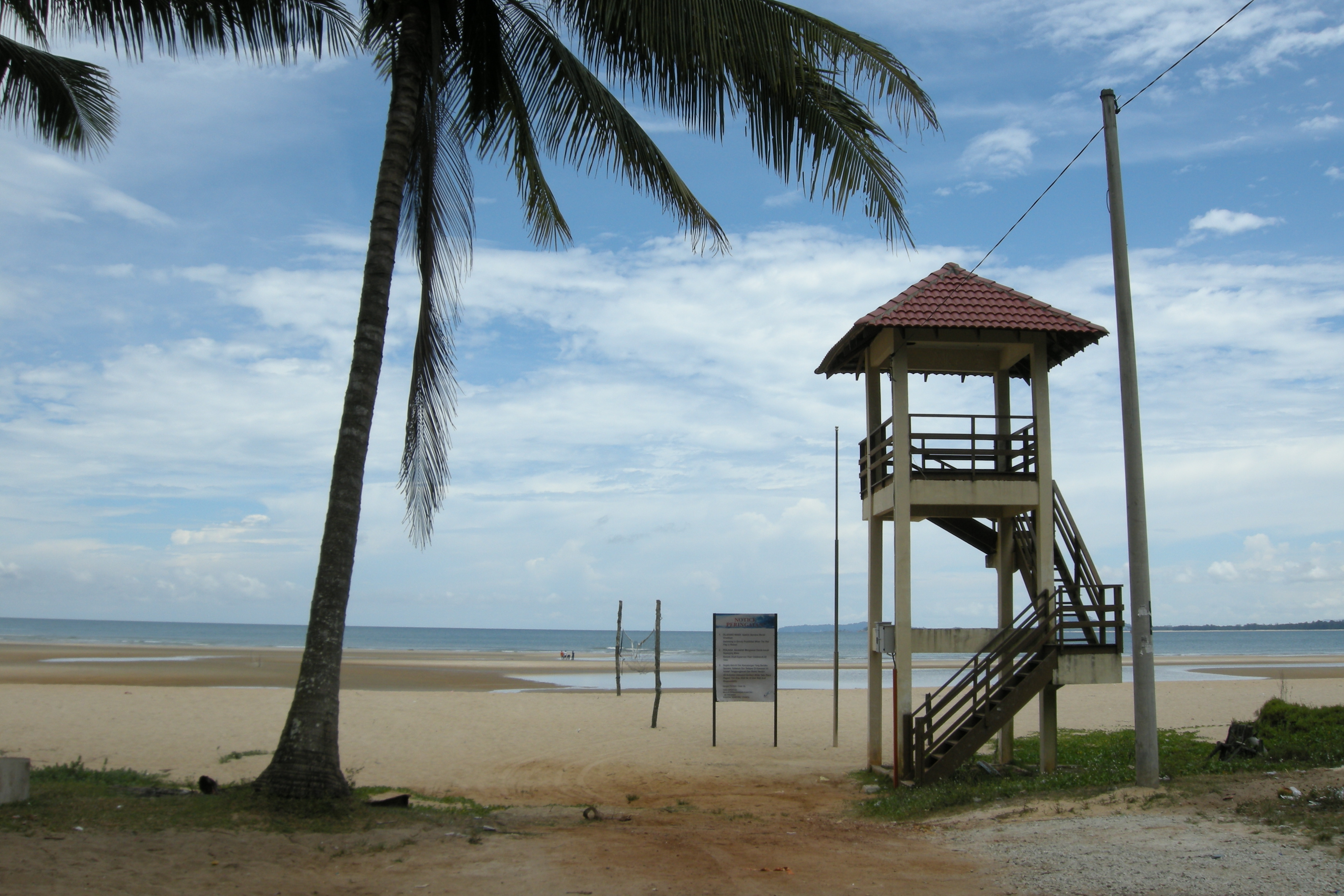
Cherating beach.

Cherating (Jawi: چراتيڠ) is a coastal town in Kuantan District, Pahang, Malaysia. It is located 47 kilometers north of Kuantan. The beaches along Chendor Beach have many hotels and resorts. Cherating was also the location of Asia's first Club Med.

Cherating has a cultural village which sells traditional textiles and handicrafts. There is a turtle sanctuary at Cherating's beach. The turtles lay their eggs in July and August.

== Climate ==
Cherating is one of the wettest places in Malaysia, with heavy rainfall all year round. The rainy season usually runs from October - April and many hotels and restaurants close during this time. The high (dry) season runs from April - October.

== See also ==
- Teluk Cempedak
- Tanjung Sepat, Pahang
- Batu Hitam
