= Bandar Indera Mahkota =

Bandata
- Suburb of Kuantan
- Interactive map of Bandata
- Coordinates: 3°49′36″N 103°17′39″E
- Country: Malaysia
- State: Pahang
- District: Kuantan
- City: Kuantan

Government
  - Local government: Kuantan City Council
- Time zone: UTC+8 (MST)
  - Summer (DST): Not observed
- Postal code: 25200
- Website: mpk.gov.my

Indera Mahkota is a township in Kuantan, Pahang, Malaysia.

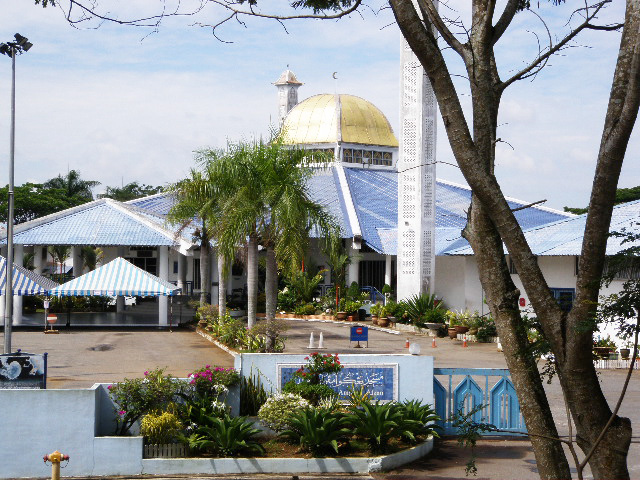
Tengku Ampuan Afzan Mosque in Indera Mahkota 1.

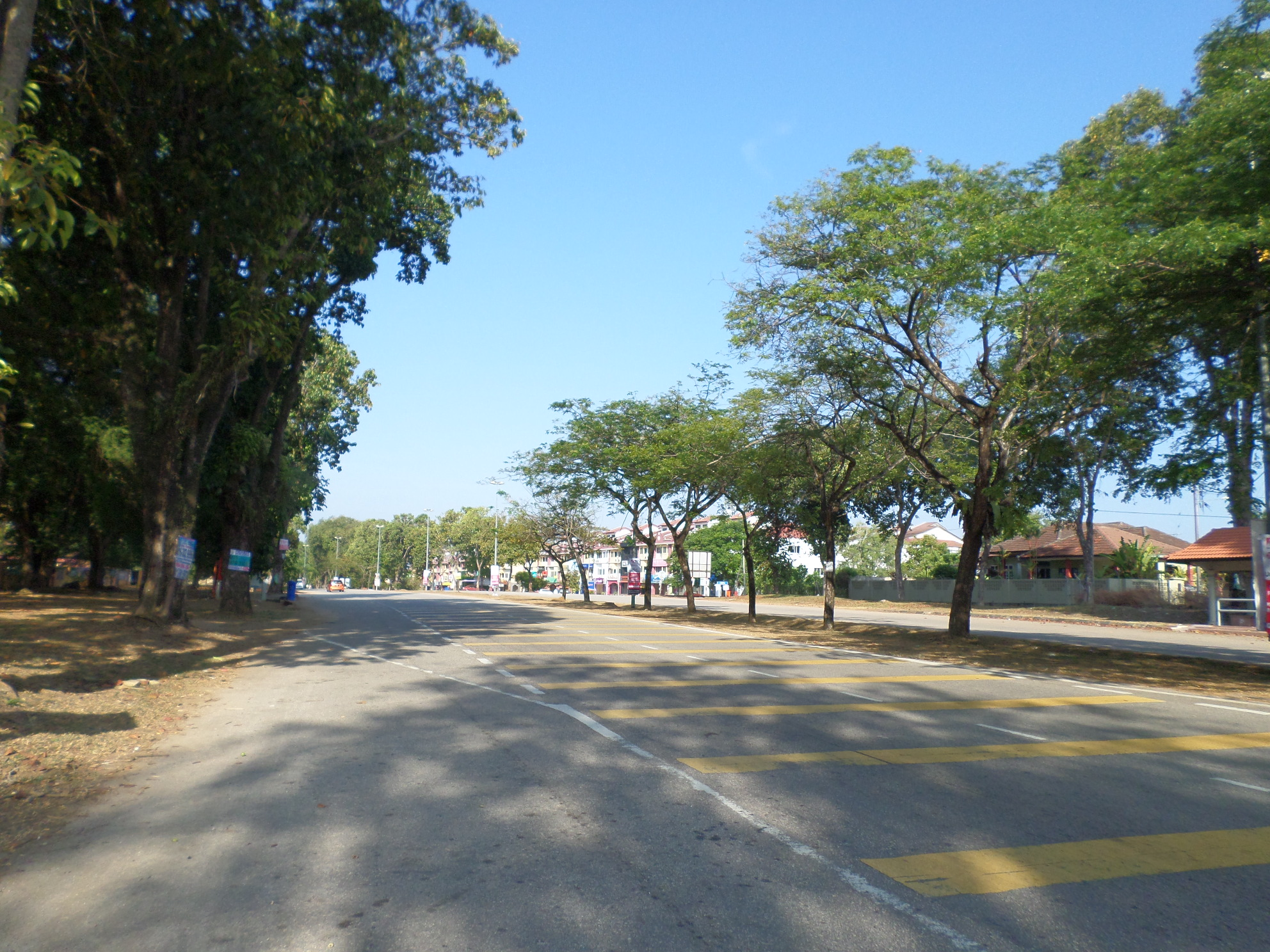
Road and building in Indera Mahkota.
