= Tanjung Sepat, Pahang =

Coordinates: 3°41′24″N 103°20′20″E

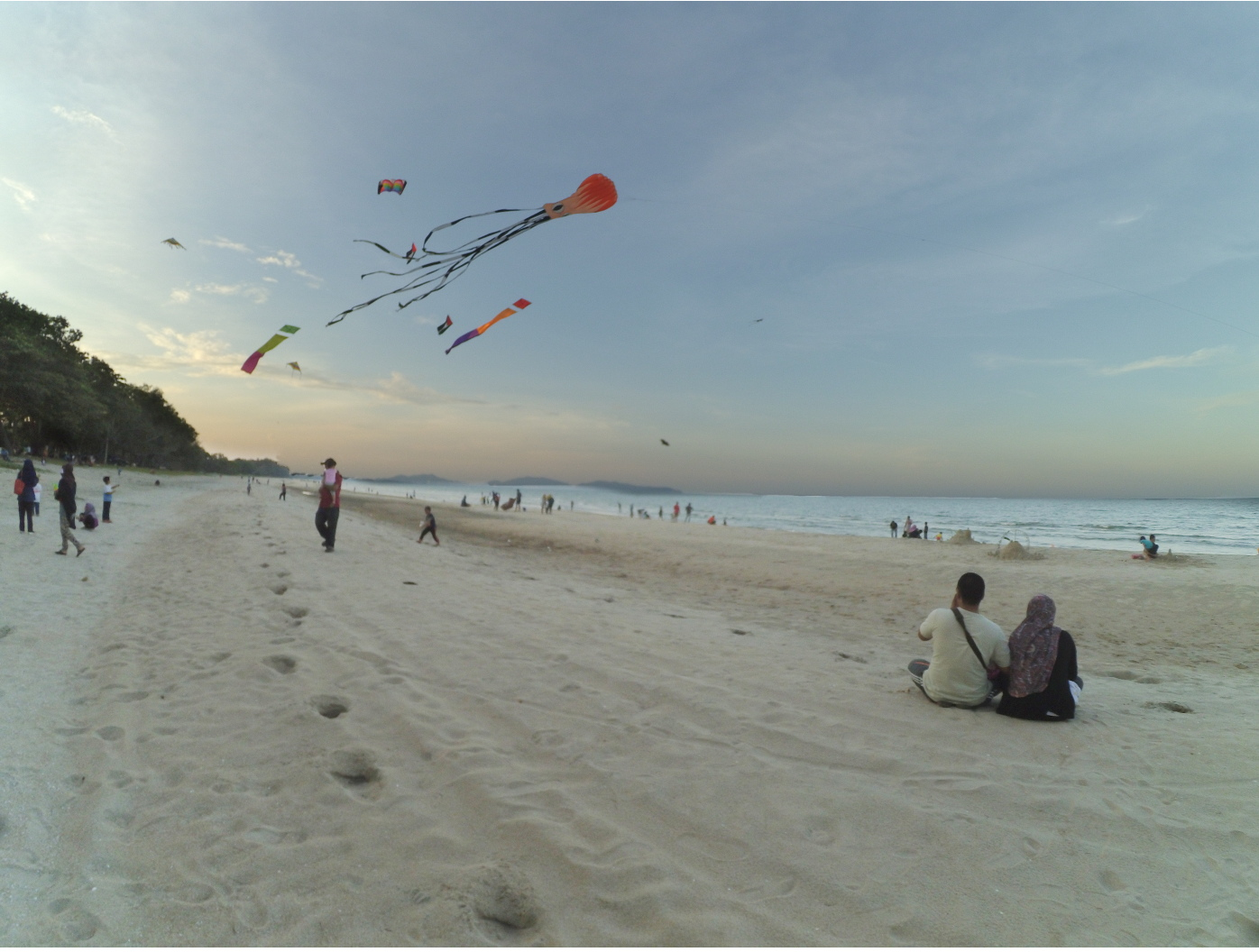
Sepat beach.

Tanjung Sepat or better known as Pantai Sepat is a typical Malay fishing village located in Kuantan District, Pahang, Malaysia. From Kuantan, it is accessible via Jalan Abu Bakar Federal Route 183 and is an alternative way to the royal town of Pekan.

Unlike beaches which slope to the sea for some few meters and then suddenly drop deep, the beach at Pantai Sepat seems to slope very gradually to the sea. The beach is famous among locals as the place is serene and tranquil.

== See also ==
- Teluk Cempedak
- Cherating
- Batu Hitam
