= Malaysia Federal Route 10 =

Road in Malaysia

Federal Route 10

Route information
- Maintained by Malaysian Public Works Department
- Length: 122.21 km (75.94 mi)

Major junctions
- North end: Temerloh, Pahang
- FT 87 Federal Route 87; FT 2 Federal Route 2 FT 2 Mentakab–Temerloh Bypass; FT 1510 Jalan Utama Bera; FT 1518 Jalan Utama Bukit Mendi–FELDA Chemomoi; FT 11 Bera Highway; FT 245 Federal Route 245; FT 244 Jalan Bandar Seri Jempol; FT 13 Federal Route 13; FT 1279 Jalan Bukit Rokan; FT 1 Federal Route 1
- South end: Gemas, Negeri Sembilan

Location
- Country: Malaysia
- Primary destinations: Mengkarak, Bandar Bera, Teriang, Mengkuang, Kemayan, Bandar Seri Jempol, Bahau, Rompin

Highway system
- Highways in Malaysia; Expressways; Federal; State

Federal Route 10 is a federal road in Pahang and Negeri Sembilan, Malaysia. It connects Temerloh, Pahang in the north to Gemas, Negeri Sembilan in the south.

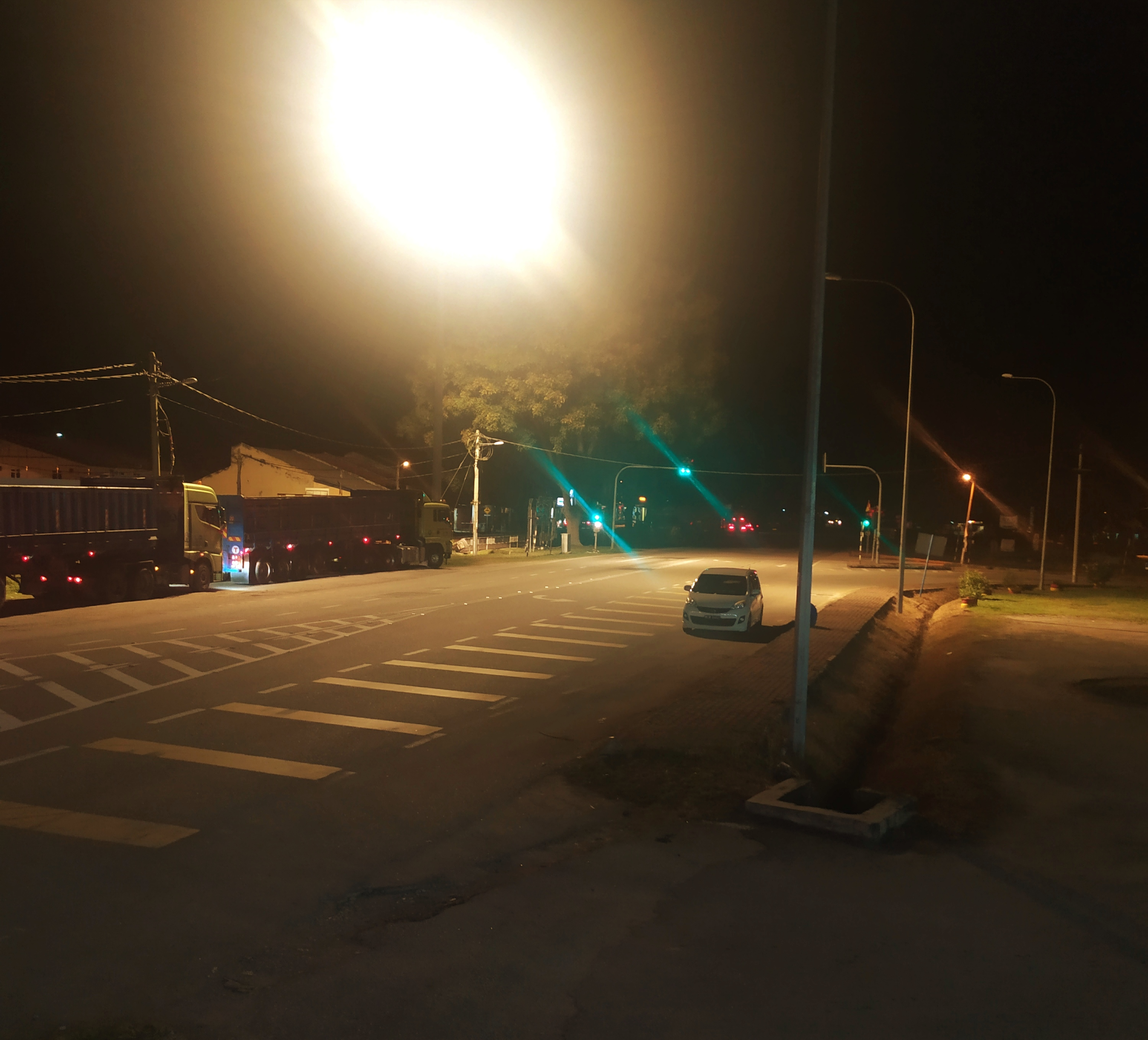
The route at the junction with Federal Route 44 in Pasir Besar, near Gemas

== Route background ==
The Kilometre Zero is located at Gemas, Negeri Sembilan, at its interchange with the Federal Route 1, the main trunk road of the central of Peninsular Malaysia.

Federal Route 10 is one of the federal route connecting between Pahang and Negeri Sembilan, another one federal route is Federal Route 9.

== History ==
The corner near to the Kampung China is changed to a T-junctions, after the Bandar IOI Bahau is developed.

On 2 January 2022, the Federal Route 10 is closed for all types of transport due to the flood for the section 17.50 until the Rompin police station. The alternative route is through FT11 Federal Route 11 and FT44 Jalan Utama Palong. The Federal Route 10 reopened on 3 January, just one day after the closure.

== Features ==
- Roads along Pahang River between Temerloh and Mengkarak
- Sungai Lui Japanese War Memorial
- Two railway level crossing Federal Route 10 at Bahau
- One parclo interchange connecting Federal Route 2 and Federal Route 87

At most sections, the Federal Route 10 was built under the JKR R5 road standard, with a speed limit of 90 km/h.

=== Alternative route ===
- Kampung China–Taman Bahau: New roads built by the IOI Group

== Junction and town lists ==
Legend:

- I/C - Interchange, I/S - Intersection, RSA - Rest and service area, OBR - Overhead bridge restaurant, R/R - Restaurant and rest plaza, L/B - Layby, V/P - Vista point, TN - tunnel, T/P - Toll plaza, BR - Bridge
- C - Cloverleaf, S - Stack, T-A - Trumpet-A, T-B - Trumpet-B, DT - Directional-T/Y, SDT - Semi-Directional-T/Y, P-Y - Partial-Y, D - Diamond, P-C - Partial cloverleaf, D-D - Diverging diamond, D-R - Direct ramp

State	District	Location	km	mi	Name	Destinations	Notes
Pahang	Temerloh	Temerloh	122.21	75.94	Temerloh	FT 87 Malaysia Federal Route 87 – Town Centre, Mentakab, Jerantut, Taman Negara East Coast Expressway / AH141 – Kuala Lumpur, Kuantan, Kuala Terengganu	
Pahang	Temerloh	Temerloh			Sultan Ahmad Shah Bridge	FT 2 Mentakab–Temerloh Bypass – Kuala Lumpur, Karak, Lanchang, Earth Station, Malaysian Remote Sensing Agency (MRSA); FT 2 Malaysia Federal Route 2 – Chenor, Maran, Kuantan, Sultan Haji Ahmad Shah Hospital	Parclo interchange
Pahang	Temerloh	Perak			Kampung Tengah		
Pahang	Temerloh	Perak			Kampung Buntut Pulau		
Pahang	Temerloh	Lebak			Kampung Pangsenam		
Pahang	Temerloh	Lebak			Kampung Kuala Kujan		
Pahang	Temerloh	Lebak			Kampung Tengguh		
Pahang	Temerloh	Lebak			Kampung Pengkalan Jaya		
Pahang	Temerloh	Lebak			Kampung Tebing Tinggi		
Pahang	Temerloh	Lebak			Kampung Lebak		
Pahang	Temerloh	Lebak			Kampung Tanjung Kerayung		
Pahang	Temerloh	Lebak			Kampung Durian Tikus		
Pahang	Temerloh	Lebak			Kampung Tanjung Belengu		
Pahang	Temerloh–Bera district border				Sungai Belengu bridge		
Pahang	Bera	Mengkarak			Kampung Belengu		
Pahang	Bera	Mengkarak			Kampung Teluk		
Pahang	Bera	Mengkarak			Kampung Paya Buntar		
Pahang	Bera	Mengkarak			Kampung Jeram		
Pahang	Bera	Mengkarak			Durian Tawar		
Pahang	Bera	Mengkarak			Mengkarak	Jalan Mengkarak – Town Centre, Mengkarak railway stations	T-junctions
Pahang	Bera	Mengkarak			Kampung Kubang Panjang		
Pahang	Bera	Mengkarak			Kampung Tanjung Kuran		
Pahang	Bera	Mengkarak			Sungai Mengkarak bridge		
Pahang	Bera	Mengkarak			Mengkarak South	C8 Jalan Mengkarak–Paluh Hinai – Chenor, Paluh Hinai, Pekan, Lake Chini	T-junctions
Pahang	Bera	Mengkarak			Kampung Jeram Luar		
Pahang	Bera	Bandar Bera			Seri Bera		
Pahang	Bera	Bandar Bera			Bandar Bera	FT 1510 Jalan Utama Bera – Sebertak, FELDA Rentam, Kota Iskandar, Tasik Bera, Bandar Tun Abdul Razak, Bandar Muadzam Shah, Segamat	T-junctions
Pahang	Bera	Bandar Bera			Bandar Bera	Bera district mosque Bera District and Land Office	
Pahang	Bera	Teriang			Teriang	Town centre, Teriang railway station	T-junctions
Pahang	Bera	Teriang			Sungai Teriang bridge		
Pahang	Bera	Mengkuang			Mengkuang		
Pahang	Bera	Mengkuang			Mengkuang R/R		
Pahang	Bera	Mengkuang			Jalan Utama Bukit Mendi–FELDA Chemomoi	FT 1518 Jalan Utama Bukit Mendi–FELDA Chemomoi – FELDA Bukit Mendi, FELDA Sungai Kemahal, FELDA Bukit Puchong, FELDA Kemansul, Mancis	T-junctions
Pahang	Bera	Kemayan			Kemayan	C118 Jalan Tembangau – FELDA Tembangau	T-junctions
Pahang	Bera	Kemayan			Kemayan RSA		
Negeri Sembilan	Jempol	Ayer Hitam			Kampung Bahru Sungai Lui		T-junctions
Negeri Sembilan	Jempol	Ayer Hitam			Sungai Lui Japanese War Memorial		Historical site
Negeri Sembilan	Jempol	Ayer Hitam			Ayer Kering	Ayer Kering	T-junctions
Negeri Sembilan	Jempol	Ayer Hitam			FELDA Lui Muda		
Negeri Sembilan	Jempol	Ayer Hitam			FELDA Lui Selatan	FELDA Lui Selatan	T-junctions
Negeri Sembilan	Jempol	Ayer Hitam			De Bana Recreation Park	V De Bana National Service Camp	
Negeri Sembilan	Jempol	Ayer Hitam			FELDA Lui Barat		
Negeri Sembilan	Jempol	Ayer Hitam			Gugusan Ayer Hitam		
Negeri Sembilan	Jempol	Ayer Hitam			Kampung Baharu		
Negeri Sembilan	Jempol	Ayer Hitam			Ayer Hitam	FT 245 Malaysia Federal Route 245 – Ulu Serting, Kuala Klawang, Batu Kikir	T-junctions
Negeri Sembilan	Jempol	Ayer Hitam			Ayer Hitam	Ayer Hitam railway stations	T-junctions
Negeri Sembilan	Jempol	Bandar Seri Jempol			Railway crossing bridge		
Negeri Sembilan	Jempol	Bandar Seri Jempol			Bandar Seri Jempol	FT 244 Jalan Bandar Seri Jempol – Town Centre, Masjid Tuanku Muhriz Daerah Jempol, Jempol District and Land Office, Jempol Hospital	T-junctions
Negeri Sembilan	Jempol	Bandar Seri Jempol			Bera Highway	FT 11 Bera Highway – Serting, Kuala Klawang, Kuala Pilah, Seremban, Bandar Tun Abdul Razak, Bandar Muadzam Shah, Pekan, Kuantan	Junctions
Negeri Sembilan	Jempol	Bandar Seri Jempol			Bandar Seri Jempol R/R		
Negeri Sembilan	Jempol	Bandar Seri Jempol			Kampung Mahsan		
Negeri Sembilan	Jempol	Bahau			Sungai Bahau bridge		
Negeri Sembilan	Jempol	Bahau			Kampung China		
Negeri Sembilan	Jempol	Bahau			Bahau Industrial Area		
Negeri Sembilan	Jempol	Bahau			Railway crossing		
Negeri Sembilan	Jempol	Bahau			Bahau	FT 13 Malaysia Federal Route 13 – Juasseh, Batu Kikir, Kuala Pilah, Seremban, Bahau railway station	T-junctions
Negeri Sembilan	Jempol	Bahau			Railway crossing		
Negeri Sembilan	Jempol	Bahau			Railway crossing		
Negeri Sembilan	Jempol	Rompin			Rompin	N20 Jalan Kepis–Rompin – Kepis, Dangi	Roundabout
Negeri Sembilan	Jempol	Rompin			Kampung Panjis		
Negeri Sembilan	Tampin	Gemas			Pasir Besar	FT 44 Jalan Utama Palong – FELDA Palong 1-16, FELDA Palong Timur	T-junction
Negeri Sembilan	Tampin	Gemas			Kampung Pasir Besar	N119 Jalan Pasir Besar – Pasir Besar, Londah	T-junctions
Negeri Sembilan	Tampin	Gemas			Sungai Muar bridge		
Negeri Sembilan	Tampin	Gemas			Jalan Bukit Rokan	FT 1279 Jalan Bukit Rokan – FELDA Bukit Rokan, Gemencheh	T-junctions
Negeri Sembilan	Tampin	Gemas			Sungai Gemencheh bridge		
Negeri Sembilan	Tampin	Gemas	0.0	0.0	Gemas; Gemas West	FT 1 Malaysia Federal Route 1 – Seremban, Tampin, Gemencheh, Gemas town centre, Segamat, Johor Bahru	T-junctions
1.000 mi = 1.609 km; 1.000 km = 0.621 mi
