= Jalan Mengkarak–Paluh Hinai =

Road in Malaysia

Pahang State Route C8, C130 and C108
- Jalan Mengkarak-Paluh Hinai

Route information
- Length: 107 km (66 mi)

Major junctions
- West end: Mengkarak
- FT 10 Federal Route 10; FT 12 Tun Razak Highway; FT 82 Federal Route 82
- East end: Paluh Hinai

Location
- Country: Malaysia
- Primary destinations: Bera, Chenor, Lake Chini, Pekan

Highway system
- Highways in Malaysia; Expressways; Federal; State

Jalan Mengkarak-Paluh Hinai (Pahang State Route C8, C130 and C108) is a 107 kilometres (66 mi) long state route in Pahang, and a major road in Pahang, Malaysia.

== Junction lists ==
The entire route is located in Pahang.

Legend:

- I/C - Interchange, I/S - Intersection, RSA - Rest and service area, OBR - Overhead bridge restaurant, R/R - Restaurant and rest plaza, L/B - Layby, V/P - Vista point, TN - tunnel, T/P - Toll plaza, BR - Bridge
- C - Cloverleaf, S - Stack, T-A - Trumpet-A, T-B - Trumpet-B, DT - Directional-T/Y, SDT - Semi-Directional-T/Y, P-Y - Partial-Y, D - Diamond, P-C - Partial cloverleaf, D-D - Diverging diamond, D-R - Direct ramp

District	Location	km	mi	Name	Destinations	Notes
Bera	Mengkarak			Mengkarak	FT 10 Malaysia Federal Route 10 – Temerloh, Mentakab, Jerantut, Bentong, Kuantan, Bandar Bera, Teriang, Bahau, Gemas East Coast Expressway / AH141 – Kuala Lumpur, Kuala Terengganu	T-junctions
Bera	Mengkarak			Kampung Tok Langit		
Bera	Mengkarak			Kampung Bukit Keledang		
Bera	Mengkarak			Kampung Seberang Guai		
Bera	Mengkarak			Tirang River bridge		
Bera	Mengkarak			Kampung Bukit Imam Sulong		
Bera	Mengkarak			Kampung Tengah Batu Papan		
Bera	Mengkarak			Kuala Bera		
Bera	Mengkarak			Sungai Bera bridge		
Bera	Mengkarak			Kampung Lubuk Lian		
Bera	Mengkarak			Kampung Bohor Baru		
Maran	Chenor			Kertau		
Maran	Chenor			Chenor		
Maran	Chenor			Kampung Pesagi		
Maran	Chenor			Kuala Wau		
Pekan	Paluh Hinai			Kampung Melayu		
Pekan	Paluh Hinai			Kampung Duri		
Pekan	Paluh Hinai			Kampung Semanggang		
Pekan	Paluh Hinai			Kampung Salung Tengah		
Pekan	Paluh Hinai			Kampung Salung Hilir		
Pekan	Paluh Hinai			Kampung Baharu	Jalan Tasik Chini – Kampung Tasik Chini, FELDA Chini, Lake Chini	T-junctions
Pekan	Paluh Hinai			Kampung Gaung		
Pekan	Paluh Hinai			Kuala Mentiga		
Pekan	Paluh Hinai			Paluh Hinai	FT 12 / AH142 Tun Razak Highway – Gambang, Kuantan, Bandar Muadzam Shah, Bandar Tun Abdul Razak, Segamat; FT 82 Malaysia Federal Route 82 – Pekan, Kuala Pahang, Rompin East Coast Expressway / AH141 – Kuala Lumpur, Kuala Terengganu	Junctions
1.000 mi = 1.609 km; 1.000 km = 0.621 mi
