= List of schools in Pahang =

This is a list of schools in Pahang, Malaysia. It is categorised according to the variants of schools in Malaysia, and is arranged alphabetically.

== Secondary education: Sekolah Menengah Agama (SMA) ==
- Sekolah Menengah Agama Al Attas (SMAA), Pekan
- Sekolah Menengah Agama Al-Ihsan (SMAI), Kuantan
- Sekolah Menengah Agama Al-khairiah (SMAKT), Temerloh
- Sekolah Menengah Agama Bukit Ibam, Kuantan
- Sekolah Menengah Kebangsaan Agama Tengku Ampuan Hajjah Afzan Pahang (TAHAP), Jerantut
- Sekolah Menengah Kebangsaan Agama Pahang
- Sekolah Menengah Agama Tengku Ampuan Fatimah, Pekan

== Mara Junior Science College (MRSM) ==
- Maktab Rendah Sains MARA Muadzam Shah, Rompin (MRSM MUSHA)
- Maktab Rendah Sains MARA Angkatan Tentera Malaysia Bera (MRSM ATM BERA)
- Maktab Rendah Sains MARA Kuantan (MRSM KU)
- Maktab Rendah Sains MARA Bentong (MRSM BENTECH)
- Maktab Rendah Sains MARA Tun Ghazali Shafie, Lipis (MRSM TGS)
- Maktab Rendah Sains MARA Tun Abdul Razak, Pekan (MRSM TAR)

== Fully residential schools ==
- Sekolah Sains Sultan Haji Ahmad Shah Pekan (SHAH)
- Sekolah Berasrama Penuh Integrasi Kuantan (INTEK)
- Sekolah Berasrama Penuh Integrasi Tun Abdul Razak, Pekan (INSTAR)
- Sekolah Berasrama Penuh Integrasi Temerloh (INSOFT)
- Sekolah Menengah Sains Sultan Haji Ahmad Shah, Kuantan (SEMSAS)
- Sekolah Menengah Sains Tengku Abdullah, Raub (SEMESTA)
- Sekolah Menengah Agama Persekutuan Bentong (SUPERB)

== National schools ==
=== Sekolah Kebangsaan (SK) ===
- Sekolah Kebangsaan Bukit Rangin (SKBR)
- Sekolah Kebangsaan (Felda) Lepar Hilir
- Sekolah Kebangsaan (Felda) Sungai Koyan, Raub (SKSK)
- Sekolah Kebangsaan (LKTP) Chini Timur 01 (SKCT 01)
- Sekolah Kebangsaan Abu Bakar Mentakab
- Sekolah Kebangsaan Assunta Convent (SKAC)
- Sekolah Kebangsaan Bandar Jerantut
- Sekolah Kebangsaan Bandar Temerloh
- Sekolah Kebangsaan Batu Kapor
- Sekolah Kebangsaan Bukit Bota
- Sekolah Kebangsaan Bukit Ibam, Muadzam Shah
- Sekolah Kebangsaan Bukit Ridan, Muadzam Shah
- Sekolah Kebangsaan Bukit Sekilau Kuantan (SKBS) CBA4076
- Sekolah Kebangsaan Bukit Setongkol CBA
- Sekolah Kebangsaan Buluh Nipis
- Sekolah Kebangsaan Cenderawasih
- Sekolah Kebangsaan Chenor
- Sekolah Kebangsaan Galing
- Sekolah Kebangsaan Indera Mahkota (SKIM)
- Sekolah Kebangsaan Indera Mahkota Utama (SKIMU)
- Sekolah Kebangsaan Jerantut
- Sekolah Kebangsaan Kampung Chat
- Sekolah Kebangsaan Keratong Lapan, Muadzam Shah
- Sekolah Kebangsaan Keratong Sepuluh, Muadzam Shah
- Sekolah Kebangsaan Kerayong, Bera
- Sekolah Kebangsaan Ladang Kota Bahagia, Muadzam Shah
- Sekolah Kebangsaan Mahmud, Raub
- Sekolah Kebangsaan Sungai Karang
- Sekolah Kebangsaan Padang Tengku, Kuala Lipis (SKPT)
- Sekolah Kebangsaan LKTP Jengka 12, Maran, Pahang
- Sekolah Kebangsaan Mentakab (Chatin)
- Sekolah Kebangsaan Muadzam Jaya, Muadzam Shah
- Sekolah Kebangsaan Muadzam Shah, Muadzam Shah
- Sekolah Kebangsaan Pengkalan Tentera
- Sekolah Kebangsaan Permatang Badak
- Sekolah Kebangsaan Pianggu
- Sekolah Kebangsaan Pulau Mansok
- Sekolah Kebangsaan Simpang Pelangai
- Sekolah Kebangsaan Sri Layang, Genting Highlands
- Sekolah Kebangsaan Sulaiman Bentong
- Sekolah Kebangsaan Sultan Abdullah, Kuantan
- Sekolah Kebangsaan Sungai Isap
- Sekolah Kebangsaan Sungai Soi
- Sekolah Kebangsaan Tanjong Gemok
- Sekolah Kebangsaan Tanjung Lumpur
- Sekolah Kebangsaan Teruntum
- Sekolah Kebangsaan Kota Perdana
- Sekolah Kebangsaan Sungai Baging
- Sekolah Kebangsaan Wira, Kuantan
- Sekolah Kebangsaan Perting, Bentong
- Sekolah Kebangsaan Peramu Jaya
- Sekolah Kebangsaan Pulau Serai
- Sekolah Kebangsaan Tanjong Agas, Pekan

=== Sekolah Jenis Kebangsaan Tamil (SJK [T]) ===
- SJK (Tamil) Mentakab (Cluster School)
- SJK (Tamil) Bandar Indera Mahkota
- SJK (Tamil) Bukit Fraser
- SJK (Tamil) Ladang Mentakab
- SJK (Tamil) Sri Telemong
- SJK (Tamil) Lurah Bilut
- SJK (Tamil) Ladang Renjok
- SJK (Tamil) Karak
- SJK (Tamil) Bentong
- SJK (Tamil) Ladang Lanchang
- SJK (Tamil) Ladang Semantan
- SJK (Tamil) Ladang Yeow Cheng Luan
- SJK (Tamil) Ladang Jeram
- SJK (Tamil) Ladang Telemong
- SJK (Tamil) Ladang Kuala Reman
- SJK (Tamil) Ladang Karmen
- SJK (Tamil) Ladang Edensor
- SJK (Tamil) Ladang Sg. Palas
- SJK (Tamil) Ladang Gali
- SJK (Tamil) Ladang Bee Yong
- SJK (Tamil) Ladang Kawang
- SJK (Tamil) Ladang Tekal
- SJK (Tamil) Ladang Menteri
- SJK (Tamil) Ladang Kemayan
- SJK (Tamil) Ladang Boh 1
- SJK (Tamil) Ladang Boh 2
- SJK (Tamil) Shum Yip Leong
- SJK (Tamil) Ladang Cheroh
- SJK (Tamil) Ringlet
- SJK (Tamil) Ladang Selborne
- SJK (Tamil) Ladang Benta
- SJK (Tamil) Ladang Budu
- SJK (Tamil) Kuala Lipis
- SJK (Tamil) Tanah Rata
- SJK (Tamil) Ladang Blue Valley
- SJK (Tamil) Shum Yip Leong
- SJK (Tamil) Kuala Terla
- SJK (Tamil) Jerantut
- SJK (Tamil) Raub
- SJK (Tamil) Ladang Cheroh
- SJK (Tamil) Sungai Penjuring
- SJK (Tamil) Jerik

=== Secondary education: Sekolah Menengah Kebangsaan (SMK) ===
School code	School name	Postcode	Area	Coordinates
CEA0060	SMK (FELDA) Chemomoi	28310	Triang	3.2465°N 102.2450°E
CEA0053	SMK (FELDA) Lurah Bilut	28800	Lurah Bilut	3.6621°N 101.8918°E
CEAA156	SMK (FELDA) Purun	28330	Triang	3.3751°N 102.6310°E
CEA3055	SMK (FELDA) Sg Koyan	27650	Raub	4.2301°N 101.8060°E
CEA5061	SMK (LKTP) Chini	26690	Chini	3.3823°N 102.9481°E
CEA9158	SMK (LKTP) Jengka 10	26400	Bandar Jengka	3.8344°N 102.5440°E
CEA9165	SMK (LKTP) Jengka 16	26400	Bandar Jengka	3.6964°N 102.5340°E
CEA9160	SMK (LKTP) Jengka 18	26400	Bandar Jengka	3.5986°N 102.5370°E
CEA9114	SMK (LKTP) Jengka 2	26430	Bandar Jengka	3.7132°N 102.6140°E
CEA9161	SMK (LKTP) Jengka 21	26400	Bandar Jengka	3.7332°N 102.4720°E
CEA9133	SMK (LKTP) Jengka 6	26410	Bandar Jengka	3.6418°N 102.6230°E
CEA9116	SMK (LKTP) Kampung Awah	28030	Temerloh	3.5074°N 102.5267°E
CEA0015	SMK (LKTP) Kg Sertik	28610	Karak	3.4919°N 102.0330°E
CEB4034	SMK (P) Methodist	25000	Kuantan	3.8122°N 103.3291°E
CEB6028	SMK (P) Methodist	27600	Raub	3.7996°N 101.8506°E
CEA4022	SMK Abdul Rahman Talib	25250	Kuantan	3.8242°N 103.3411°E
CEB7068	SMK Abu Bakar	28000	Temerloh	3.4534°N 102.4102°E
CEB4035	SMK Air Putih	25300	Kuantan	3.8285°N 103.3389°E
CEA4023	SMK Alor Akar	25050	Kuantan	3.8271°N 103.3530°E
CEA4088	SMK Astana	25200	Kuantan	3.8475°N 103.2767°E
CEAA161	SMK Bandar Kerayong	28200	Bandar Bera	3.2633°N 102.4490°E
CEA8024	SMK Bandar Tun Razak	26900	Bandar Tun Razak	2.8971°N 102.8960°E
CEA3036	SMK Benta	27300	Benta	4.0201°N 101.9730°E
CEA0014	SMK Bentong	28700	Bentong	3.4977°N 101.9274°E
CEAA061	SMK Bera	28300	Triang	3.2622°N 102.6080°E
CEA4024	SMK Beserah	26100	Kuantan	3.8779°N 103.3658°E
CEA7072	SMK Bukit Cermin	28400	Mentakab	3.4658°N 102.3602°E
CEA7068	SMK Bukit Damar	28500	Lanchang	3.5332°N 102.1290°E
CEA4071	SMK Bukit Goh	26050	Kuantan	3.9137°N 103.2577°E
CEAA115	SMK Bukit Mendi	28320	Triang	3.2077°N 102.3090°E
CEA4081	SMK Bukit Rangin	25150	Kuantan	3.8022°N 103.2716°E
CEA4097	SMK Bukit Sagu	25740	Kuantan	3.9595°N 103.1921°E
CEA0057	SMK Bukit Tinggi	28750	Bentong	3.3566°N 101.8418°E
CEA9169	SMK Cedung Jaya	26500	Maran	3.5779°N 102.7730°E
CEA4090	SMK Cenderawasih	25200	Kuantan	3.8129°N 103.2963°E
CEA8023	SMK Chanis	26700	Muadzam Shah	2.8546°N 102.9800°E
CEA4100	SMK Chengal Lempong	26080	Kuantan	3.9316°N 103.3624°E
CEA5080	SMK Chini 2	26690	Chini	3.3776°N 102.9498°E
CEA5073	SMK Chini Timur	26690	Chini	3.3233°N 103.0161°E
CEB6029	SMJK Chung Ching	27600	Raub	3.7983°N 101.8571°E
CEB3039	SMJK Chung Hwa	27200	Kuala Lipis	4.1862°N 102.0460°E
CEA2047	SMK Damak	27030	Jerantut	3.9489°N 102.2220°E
CEB6027	SMK Dato Shahbandar Hussain	27600	Raub	3.8029°N 101.8503°E
CEA5053	SMK Dato' Mahmud Mat	26600	Pekan	3.5829°N 103.3740°E
CEA7065	SMK Datuk Bahaman	28500	Lanchang	3.5009°N 102.1840°E
CEA9168	SMK Desa Jaya	26400	Bandar Jengka	3.7758°N 102.5550°E
CEA6023	SMK Dong	27400	Raub	3.9039°N 101.8970°E
CEA6026	SMK Gali	27600	Raub	3.9014°N 101.9043°E
CEA4095	SMK Gambang	26300	Kuantan	3.7237°N 103.1364°E
CEA4082	SMK Gudang Rasau	25150	Kuantan	3.7671°N 103.2557°E
CEB7071	SMJK Hwa Lian	28400	Mentakab	3.4820°N 102.3390°E
CEA4080	SMK Indera Mahkota 2	25200	Kuantan	3.8337°N 103.2699°E
CEA5075	SMK Indera Shahbandar	26660	Pekan	3.5498°N 103.4330°E
CEA2053	SMK Inderapura	27000	Jerantut	3.9186°N 102.3526°E
CEA9166	SMK Jengka 12	26400	Bandar Jengka	3.7749°N 102.4866°E
CEA2054	SMK Jengka 24	26400	Bandar Jengka	3.7827°N 102.4416°E
CEA9157	SMK Jengka Pusat	26400	Bandar Jengka	3.7753°N 102.5470°E
CEA9162	SMK Jengka Pusat 2	26400	Bandar Jengka	3.7556°N 102.5590°E
CEE2032	SMK Jerantut	27000	Jerantut	3.9491°N 102.3656°E
CEA2050	SMK Jubli Perak Sultan Haji Ahmad Shah	27000	Jerantut	4.3580°N 102.4041°E
CEA1001	SMK Kampung Raja	39010	Tanah Rata	4.5640°N 101.4077°E
CEE0016	SMK Karak	28600	Karak	3.4118°N 102.0370°E
CEA0059	SMK Karak Setia	28600	Karak	3.4267°N 102.0529°E
CEB0020	SMJK Katholik	28700	Bentong	3.5190°N 101.9139°E
CEAA159	SMK Kemayan	28380	Kemayan	3.1347°N 102.3764°E
CEA3058	SMK Kerambit	27200	Kuala Lipis	4.1181°N 102.2110°E
CEA8018	SMK Keratong	26900	Bandar Tun Razak	2.9040°N 102.8808°E
CEA7060	SMK Kerdau	28010	Temerloh	3.5765°N 102.3840°E
CEB0019	SMK Ketari	28700	Bentong	3.5023°N 101.9131°E
CEB0021	SMJK Khai Mun	28700	Bentong	3.5319°N 101.8988°E
CEA2049	SMK Kota Gelanggi 2	27000	Jerantut	3.9206°N 102.6013°E
CEA7064	SMK Kuala Krau	28050	Kuala Krau	3.7059°N 102.3682°E
CEA3059	SMK Kuala Lanar	27200	Kuala Lipis	4.1744°N 102.1014°E
CEA0058	SMK Kuala Repas	28700	Kuantan	3.5531°N 101.8909°E
CEA2030	SMK Kuala Tembeling	27020	Jerantut	4.0675°N 102.3202°E
CEA7073	SMK Lanchang	28500	Lanchang	3.5047°N 102.1860°E
CEA5078	SMK Lepar	26300	Gambang	3.5616°N 103.0979°E
CEA4076	SMK Lepar Hilir	26300	Kuantan	3.6489°N 103.0824°E
CEA4077	SMK Lepar Utara	26400	Bandar Jengka	3.9044°N 102.7955°E
CEA6024	SMK LKTP Tersang	27610	Raub	4.0701°N 101.7990°E
CEB6026	SMK Mahmud	27600	Raub	3.7884°N 101.8610°E
CEA9059	SMK Maran	26500	Maran	3.5884°N 102.7720°E
CEA9164	SMK Maran 2	26500	Maran	3.5922°N 102.7970°E
CEA4092	SMK Mat Kilau	25150	Kuantan	3.7496°N 103.2601°E
CEAA062	SMK Mengkarak	28200	Bandar Bera	3.3096°N 102.4610°E
CEE7070	SMK Mentakab	28400	Mentakab	3.4812°N 102.3510°E
CEA3056	SMK Merapoh	27210	Kuala Lipis	4.6988°N 102.0050°E
CEA8026	SMK Muadzam Jaya	26700	Muadzam Shah	3.0794°N 103.0766°E
CEA8032	SMK Muadzam Shah	26700	Muadzam Shah	3.0601°N 103.0900°E
CEA5071	SMK Nenasi	26680	Pekan	3.1407°N 103.4380°E
CEA3034	SMK Orang Kaya Haji	27200	Kuala Lipis	4.1779°N 102.0450°E
CEA2051	SMK P. Penyelidikan Pertanian Tun Razak	27000	Jerantut	3.8828°N 102.5220°E
CEA4096	SMK Padang Garuda	26070	Kuantan	3.7917°N 103.2130°E
CEA2045	SMK Padang Piol	27040	Jerantut	4.0328°N 102.3796°E
CEA2046	SMK Padang Saujana	27000	Jerantut	3.9256°N 102.3619°E
CEA3035	SMK Padang Tengku	27100	Kuala Lipis	4.2362°N 101.9910°E
CEA5056	SMK Paloh Hinai	26650	Pekan	3.4873°N 103.0917°E
CEA4078	SMK Pandan	25150	Kuantan	3.7827°N 103.2381°E
CEE3033	SMK Panglima Garang Abdul Samad	27310	Benta	3.9975°N 101.9980°E
CEA4026	SMK Paya Besar	25150	Kuantan	3.7762°N 103.2756°E
CEA7070	SMK Paya Pulai	28000	Temerloh	3.4747°N 102.4980°E
CEA5076	SMK Pekan	26600	Pekan	3.4841°N 103.4159°E
CEA4083	SMK Pelabuhan	26100	Kuantan	3.9584°N 103.3827°E
CEA4094	SMK Pelindung	26100	Kuantan	3.8420°N 103.3689°E
CEA5079	SMK Peramu Jaya	26600	Pekan	3.5180°N 103.3970°E
CEA8021	SMK Perantau Damai	26700	Muadzam Shah	2.9729°N 102.9820°E
CEA8020	SMK Perwira Jaya	26700	Muadzam Shah	2.6238°N 103.0185°E
CEA8030	SMK Pontian Jaya	26800	Kuala Rompin	2.7487°N 103.5308°E
CEA2029	SMK Pulau Tawar	27050	Jerantut	3.8776°N 102.4343°E
CEA1002	SMK Ringlet	39200	Tanah Rata	4.4260°N 101.3842°E
CEA8017	SMK Rompin	26800	Kuala Rompin	2.8024°N 103.4851°E
CEA8031	SMK Rompin Permai	26800	Rompin	2.7952°N 103.5018°E
CEA7160	SMK Seberang Temerloh	28000	Temerloh	3.4493°N 102.4476°E
CEA6027	SMK Sega	27660	Raub	4.0300°N 101.9221°E
CEA8027	SMK Selancar	26700	Muadzam Shah	2.6915°N 102.9497°E
CEA8029	SMK Selendang	26800	Kuala Rompin	2.6528°N 103.4332°E
CEA4084	SMK Semambu	25350	Kuantan	3.8700°N 103.3277°E
CEB7069	SMK Seri Bahagia	28000	Temerloh	3.4452°N 102.4070°E
CEAA163	SMK Seri Bera	28200	Bandar Bera	3.2898°N 102.4596°E
CEA4085	SMK Seri Damai	25150	Kuantan	3.7584°N 103.2266°E
CEA9163	SMK Seri Jengka	26500	Maran	3.5584°N 102.6914°E
CEA3057	SMK Seri Lipis	27200	Kuala Lipis	4.1706°N 102.0100°E
CEB4040	SMK Seri Mahkota	25150	Kuantan	3.7568°N 103.1995°E
CEA4073	SMK Seri Panching	26010	Kuantan	3.7943°N 103.1726°E
CEA0055	SMK Seri Pelangai	28740	Bentong	3.1786°N 102.1904°E
CEA6025	SMK Seri Raub	27600	Raub	3.8117°N 101.8727°E
CEA8025	SMK Seri Rompin	26810	Kuala Rompin	2.9273°N 103.4187°E
CEA7066	SMK Seri Semantan	28400	Mentakab	3.4825°N 102.3200°E
CEB3038	SMK Setia Wangsa	27200	Kuala Lipis	4.1660°N 102.0370°E
CEA9167	SMK Sri Jaya	26020	Maran	3.6608°N 102.9090°E
CEA0061	SMK Sri Layang	69000	Bentong	3.3888°N 101.7752°E
CEB4033	SMK St Thomas	25300	Kuantan	3.8130°N 103.3308°E
CEE0018	SMK Sulaiman	28700	Bentong	3.4997°N 101.9107°E
CEB4032	SMK Sultan Abu Bakar	25300	Kuantan	3.8255°N 103.3399°E
CEE5062	SMK Sultan Ahmad	26600	Pekan	3.4873°N 103.3937°E
CEB1003	SMK Sultan Ahmad Shah	39000	Cameron Highlands	4.4696°N 101.3834°E
CEA4086	SMK Sultanah Hajjah Kalsom	26100	Kuantan	3.8970°N 103.3358°E
CEA4091	SMK Sungai Baging	26080	Kuantan	4.0804°N 103.3810°E
CEA4087	SMK Sungai Isap	25150	Kuantan	3.7972°N 103.2698°E
CEA4098	SMK Sungai Isap Murni	25150	Kuantan	3.7897°N 103.2851°E
CEE4039	SMK Sungai Lembing	26200	Sungai Lembing	3.9141°N 103.0337°E
CEA8028	SMK Sungai Puteri	26800	Kuala Rompin	2.8170°N 103.4450°E
CEA2052	SMK Sungai Retang	27000	Jerantut	4.1325°N 102.3863°E
CEB6030	SMK Sungai Ruan	27500	Raub	3.8100°N 101.9420°E
CEA4089	SMK Sungai Soi	25150	Kuantan	3.7322°N 103.3180°E
CEB4036	SMJK Tanah Puteh	25100	Kuantan	3.7940°N 103.3169°E
CEA4074	SMK Tanjong Lumpur	25150	Kuantan	3.7646°N 103.3183°E
CEA8019	SMK Tanjung Gemok	26820	Kuala Rompin	2.6831°N 103.6017°E
CEA8022	SMK Tekek	26800	Kuala Rompin	2.8173°N 104.1580°E
CEB0017	SMK Telemong	28620	Karak	3.2885°N 102.0877°E
CEA4093	SMK Teluk Chempedak	25050	Kuantan	3.8174°N 103.3595°E
CEA7071	SMK Teluk Sentang	28000	Temerloh	3.5541°N 102.4420°E
CEAA162	SMK Tembangau	28380	Kemayan	3.0292°N 102.5330°E
CEA7063	SMK Temerloh	28000	Temerloh	3.4551°N 102.4108°E
CEA7069	SMK Temerloh Jaya	28000	Temerloh	3.4451°N 102.3950°E
CEA2048	SMK Temin	27000	Jerantut	3.9190°N 102.3861°E
CEA5054	SMK Tengku Abdullah	26600	Pekan	3.4873°N 103.3964°E
CEB4069	SMK Tengku Afzan	25050	Kuantan	3.8244°N 103.3572°E
CEA6022	SMK Tengku Kudin	27600	Raub	3.8021°N 101.8505°E
CEA4075	SMK Tg Panglima Perang Tg Muhammad	25200	Kuantan	3.8217°N 103.2937°E
CEA4079	SMK Tok Sera	25050	Kuantan	3.8193°N 103.3678°E
CEBA072	SMJK Triang	28300	Triang	3.2510°N 102.4220°E
CEAA164	SMK Triang 3	28300	Triang	3.2591°N 102.5690°E
CEA5077	SMK Ubai	26610	Pekan	3.6054°N 103.3235°E
CEA9060	SM Tengku Ampuan Afzan	28100	Chenor	3.4844°N 102.5890°E

=== Secondary education: Sekolah Menengah Jenis Kebangsaan (SMJK) ===
School code	School name	Postcode	Area	Coordinates
CEB6029	SMJK Chung Ching	27600	Raub	3.7983°N 101.8571°E
CEB3039	SMJK Chung Hwa	27200	Kuala Lipis	4.1862°N 102.0460°E
CEB7071	SMJK Hwa Lian	28400	Mentakab	3.4820°N 102.3390°E
CEB4036	SMJK Tanah Puteh	25100	Kuantan	3.7940°N 103.3169°E
CEBA072	SMJK Triang	28300	Triang	3.2510°N 102.4220°E

== Chinese Type Primary and Secondary School ==
=== SMJK School ===
- Sekolah Menengah Jenis Kebangsaan Chung Ching
- Sekolah Menengah Jenis Kebangsaan Chung Hwa
- Sekolah Menengah Jenis Kebangsaan Hwa Lian
- Sekolah Menengah Jenis Kebangsaan Katholik
- Sekolah Menengah Jenis Kebangsaan Khai Mun
- Sekolah Menengah Jenis Kebangsaan Tanah Puteh
- Sekolah Menengah Jenis Kebangsaan Triang

=== Chinese Independent School ===
- Sekolah Menengah Chong Hwa Kuantan

=== Chinese Primary School ===
BENTONG

- SJK(C) KHAI MUN PAGI,
- SJK(C) KHAI MUN REPAS,
- SJK(C) KHAI MUN CHAMANG,
- SJK(C) KETARI
- SJK(C) PERTING
- SJK(C) SUNGAI DUA
- SJK(C) KARAK
- SJK(C) TELEMONG
- SJK(C) MANCHIS
- SJK(C) BUKIT TINGGI
- SJK(C) LURAH BILUT
- SJK(C) SUNGAI PENJURING

CAMERON HIGHLANDS

- SJK(C) CAMERON
- SJK(C) TANAH RATA
- SJK(C) BRINCHANG
- SJK(C) KAMPUNG RAJA
- SJK(C) BERTAM VALLEY
- SJK(C) TRINGKAP
- SJK(C) KEA FARM
- SJK(C) KUALA TERLA

JERANTUT

- SJK(C) SUNGAI JAN
- SJK(C) BATU BALAI
- SJK(C) JERANSONG
- SJK(C) DAMAK

LIPIS

- SJK(C) MELA
- SJK(C) CHUNG HWA
- SJK(C) PADANG TENGKU
- SJK(C) JERKOH
- SJK(C) PENJOM
- SJK(C) BENTA

KUANTAN

- SJK(C) SEMAMBU
- SJK(C) CHUNG CHING
- SJK(C) KUANG HWA
- SJK(C) PEI CHAI
- SJK(C) GAMBANG
- SJK(C) YOKE SHIAN
- SJK(C) KONG MIN
- SJK(C) LEMBING
- SJK(C) PANCHING
- SJK(C) POOI MING
- SJK(C) TAMAN TAS

PEKAN

- SJK(C) PEKAN
- SJK(C) KEE WHA
- SJK(C) YOKE HWA

ROMPIN

- SJK(C) ROMPIN

RAUB

- SJK(C) CHUNG CHING
- SJK(C) SEMPALIT
- SJK(C) SUNGAI RUAN
- SJK(C) YUH HWA
- SJK(C) SG LUI
- SJK(C) CHEROH
- SJK(C) TRAS
- SJK(C) SUNGAI CHETANG
- SJK(C) SANG LEE
- SJK(C) SG KLAU

TEMERLOH

- SJK(C) SUNGAI KAWANG
- SJK(C) KHEE CHEE
- SJK(C) MENTAKAB (1)
- SJK(C) MENTAKAB (2)
- SJK(C) LANCHANG
- SJK(C) YEOW CHENG LUAN
- SJK(C) KERDAU
- SJK(C) KUALA KRAU

BERA

- SJK(C) TRIANG (1)
- SJK(C) TRIANG (2)
- SJK(C) KERAYONG
- SJK(C) MENGKUANG
- SJK (C) MENGKARAK
- SJK(C) KEMASUL
- SJK(C) MENTERI
- SJK(C) KEMAYAN

MARAN

- SJK(C) PEI MIN
- SJK(C) MARAN
- SJK(C) JERIK

== Technical secondary schools: Sekolah Menengah Teknik (SMT) ==
- Sekolah Menengah Teknik Jengka
- Sekolah Menengah Teknik Kuala Lipis
- Sekolah Menengah Teknik Kuala Rompin
- Sekolah Menengah Teknik Kuantan
- Sekolah Menengah Teknik Muadzam Shah
- Sekolah Menengah Teknik Pertanian Chenor
- Sekolah Menengah Teknik Seri Pelindong
- Sekolah Menengah Teknik Temerloh
- Sekolah Menengah Teknik Tengku Ampuan Afzan (SMTTAA), Bentong

== Others ==
- Highlands International Boarding School (HIBS)
- International School of Kuantan

Sekolah Indera Shahbandar Pahang (SISP) is for primary school starting from standard 4 to standard 6.

- SISP SMK Seri Pekan
- SISP SMK Seri Tualang
- SISP SMK Seri Bentong
- SISP SMK Clifford
