= Malaysia Federal Route 82 =

Road in Malaysia

Federal Route 82
- Jalan Paloh Hinai-Pekan; Jalan Batu Balik

Route information
- Maintained by Malaysian Public Works Department
- Length: 46.28 km (28.76 mi)

Major junctions
- West end: Paloh Hinai
- FT 12 / AH142 Tun Razak Highway FT 3 / AH18 Federal Route 3
- East end: Pekan

Location
- Country: Malaysia
- Primary destinations: Gambang, Lake Chini, Segamat

Highway system
- Highways in Malaysia; Expressways; Federal; State

Federal Route 82, or Jalan Paloh Hinai-Pekan and Jalan Batu Balik, is a federal road in Pahang, Malaysia. The roads connects Paloh Hinai in the west to Pekan in the east.

== Route background ==
The Kilometre Zero of the Federal Route 82 starts at Pekan, at its junctions with the Federal Route 3, the main trunk road of the east coast of Peninsular Malaysia.

== Features ==
- Kampung Sungai Keladi, the birthplace of Tun Abdul Razak, second Malaysian Prime Minister

At most sections, the Federal Route 82 was built under the JKR R5 road standard, with a speed limit of 90 km/h.

== Junction lists ==
The entire route is located in Pekan District, Pahang.

Legend:

- I/C - Interchange, I/S - Intersection, RSA - Rest and service area, OBR - Overhead bridge restaurant, R/R - Restaurant and rest plaza, L/B - Layby, V/P - Vista point, TN - tunnel, T/P - Toll plaza, BR - Bridge
- C - Cloverleaf, S - Stack, T-A - Trumpet-A, T-B - Trumpet-B, DT - Directional-T/Y, SDT - Semi-Directional-T/Y, P-Y - Partial-Y, D - Diamond, P-C - Partial cloverleaf, D-D - Diverging diamond, D-R - Direct ramp

Location	km	mi	Name	Destinations	Notes
Paloh Hinai			Paloh Hinai	C108 Jalan Mengkarak–Paluh Hinai – Chenor, Mengkarak, Bera, Teriang, Lake Chini FT 12 / AH142 Tun Razak Highway – Gambang, Maran, Kuantan, Bandar Muadzam Shah, Bandar Tun Abdul Razak, Segamat, Johor Bahru East Coast Expressway / AH141 – Kuala Lumpur, Kuala Terengganu	Junctions
Paloh Hinai			Kampung Batu Sawar		
Paloh Hinai			Sungai Peniat		
Paloh Hinai			Kampung Pulau Rumput		
Paloh Hinai			Kampung Riti		
Paloh Hinai			Sungai Riti		
Paloh Hinai			Kampung Padang Rembia		
Paloh Hinai			Kampung Temai Hulu		
Paloh Hinai			Kampung Temai Tengah		
Paloh Hinai			Sungai Temai		
Pekan			Kampung Tanjung Pauh		
Pekan			Sungai Kubang Buaya	Orang Asli village	
Pekan			Kampung Tanjung Aceh		
Pekan			Kampung Alor Gading		
Pekan			Kampung Sungai Sekor		
Pekan			Kampung Tanjung Medang Hilir		
Pekan			Kampung Belatung		
Pekan			Kampung Pulau Keladi	Kampung Pulau Keladi – Tun Abdul Razak's birthplace V	T-junctions; Historical site
Pekan			Masjid Baru Bandar Pekan		
Pekan	0.0	0.0	Pekan	FT 3 / AH18 Malaysia Federal Route 3 – Kuantan, Kuala Terengganu, Pekan town centre, Rompin, Mersing, Johor Bahru, Istana Abu Bakar, Abu Bakar Royal Mosque, Pahang Royal Mausoleum, Sultan Abu Bakar Museum	T-junctions
1.000 mi = 1.609 km; 1.000 km = 0.621 mi
