= Malaysia Federal Route 1518 =

Road in Malaysia

Federal Route 1518
- Jalan Utama Bukit Mendi-FELDA Chemomoi

Major junctions
- West end: FELDA Kemasul
- FT 10 Federal route 10
- East end: Kemayan

Location
- Country: Malaysia
- Primary destinations: FELDA Chemomoi; FELDA Sungai Kemahal; FELDA Bukit Mendi

Highway system
- Highways in Malaysia; Expressways; Federal; State

Federal Route 1518, or Jalan Utama Bukit Mendi-FELDA Chemomoi, is a federal road in Pahang, Malaysia. It connects FELDA Kemasul to Kemayan.

At most sections, the Federal Route 1518 was built under the JKR R5 road standard, allowing maximum speed limit of up to 90 km/h.

== List of junctions and towns ==
Km	Exit	Junctions	To	Remarks
		FELDA Kemasul		
		Jalan Kemasul	West; C169 Jalan Kemasul; FT 9 Mancis; FT 9 Karak; FT 2 Bentong	T-junctions
		Kampung Chemomoi		
		Jalan Bukit Gajah	West; C109 Jalan Bukit Gajah; Kampung Bukit Gajah; Simpang Pelangai; Mancis; Karak; Bentong	T-junctions
Sungai Kemahal bridge Bentong-Bera district border
		FELDA Sungai Kemahal	South; FT 1510 Jalan Sungai Kemahal; FELDA Sungai Kemahal	T-junctions
		FELDA Bukit Mendi		
		Kemayan	North; FT 10 Temerloh; FT 2 Kuantan; FT 10 Bandar Bera; FT 10 Teriang South; FT 10 Bandar Seri Jempol; FT 10 Bahau; FT 10 Gemas	T-junctions
