= Mengkarak railway station =

Malaysian train station

Mengkarak

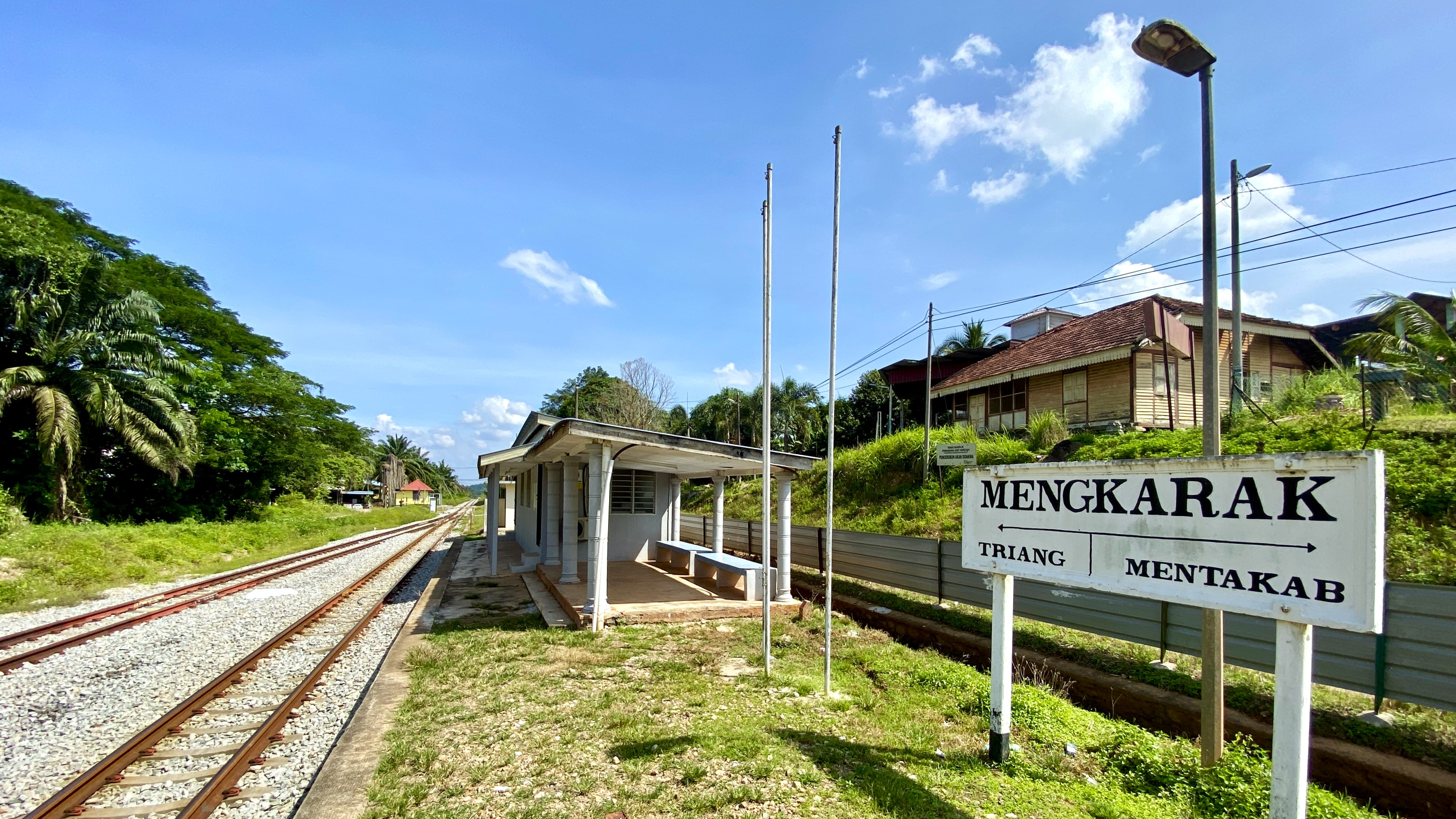

General information
- Other names: Malay: مڠکارق (Jawi); Chinese: 明加叻; Tamil: மெங்காராக்
- Location: Kampung Mengkarak Setia, 28200 Bandar Bera, Mengkarak, Bera District; Pahang; Malaysia
- Owner: Railway Assets Corporation
- Operator: Keretapi Tanah Melayu
- Line: East Coast Line
- Platforms: 1 side platform 1 island platform
- Tracks: 3

Construction
- Structure type: At-grade
- Parking: Available

Services
Preceding station	Keretapi Tanah Melayu (Intercity)	Following station
Mentakab towards Kuala Lipis	Shuttle Timur	Triang towards Gemas
Location

The Mengkarak railway station is a Malaysian train station located at and named after the town of Mengkarak in the Bera District of the state of Pahang.

The station was closed for passenger services as it was previously used by contractors working on the East Coast Rehabilitation Project.

The station is part of Keretapi Tanah Melayu's (KTM) East Coast Line.

== Train services ==
The station is served by the following KTM Intercity services:

- Shuttle Timur 34/35/36/37 Gemas–Kuala Lipis
