= List of tourist attractions in Pahang =

Tourist attractions in Pahang, Malaysia

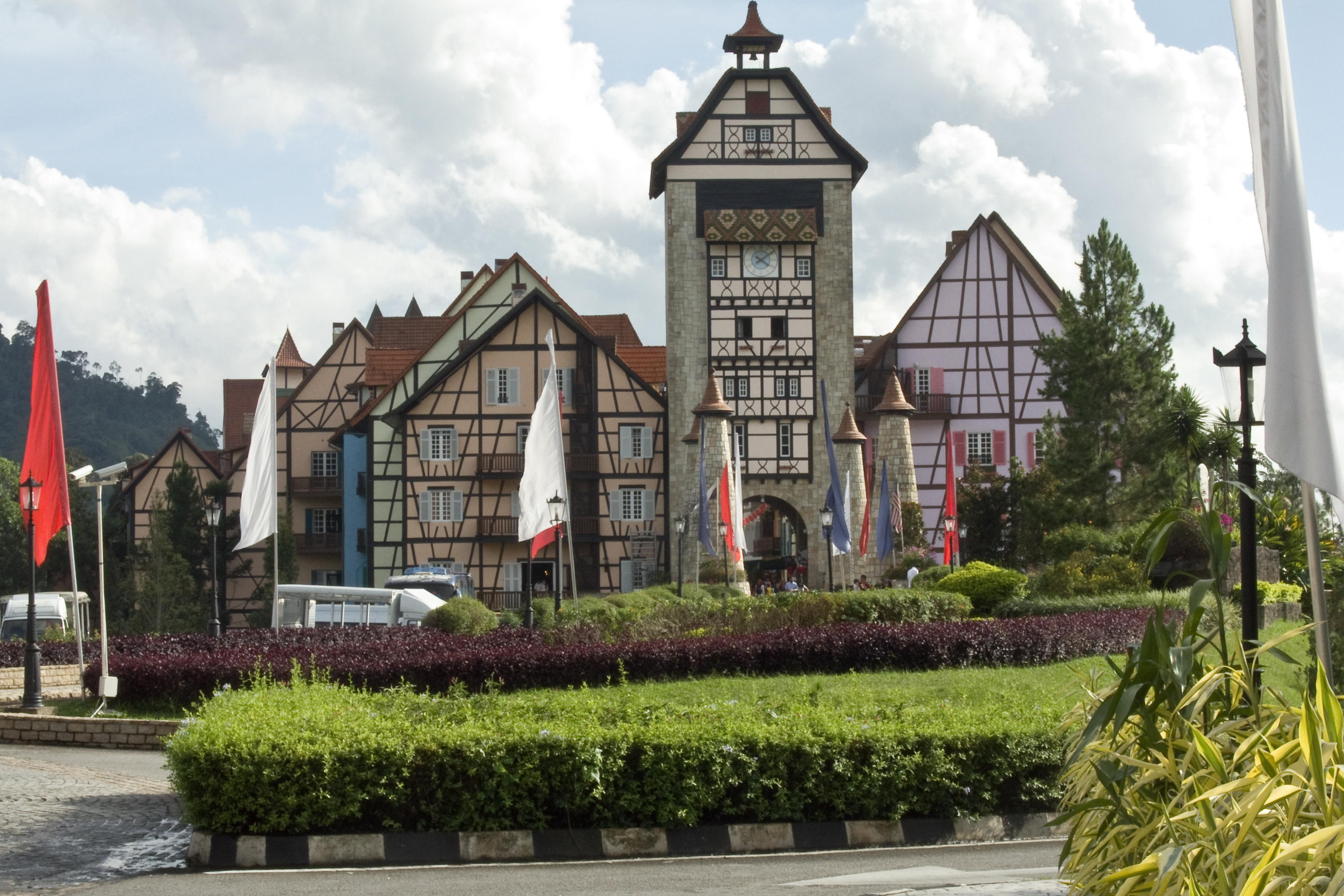
Berjaya Hills Resort

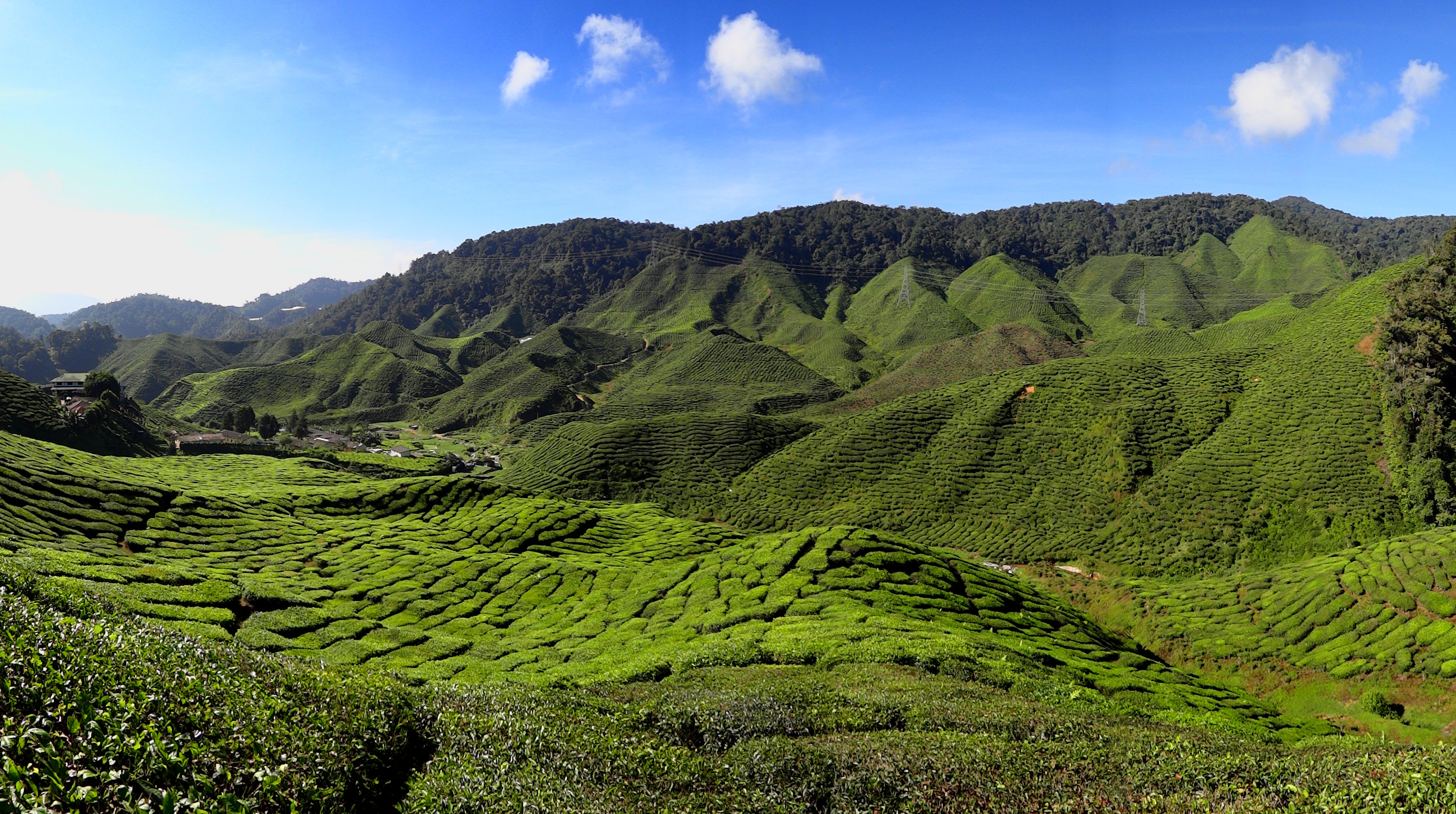
Cameron Highlands

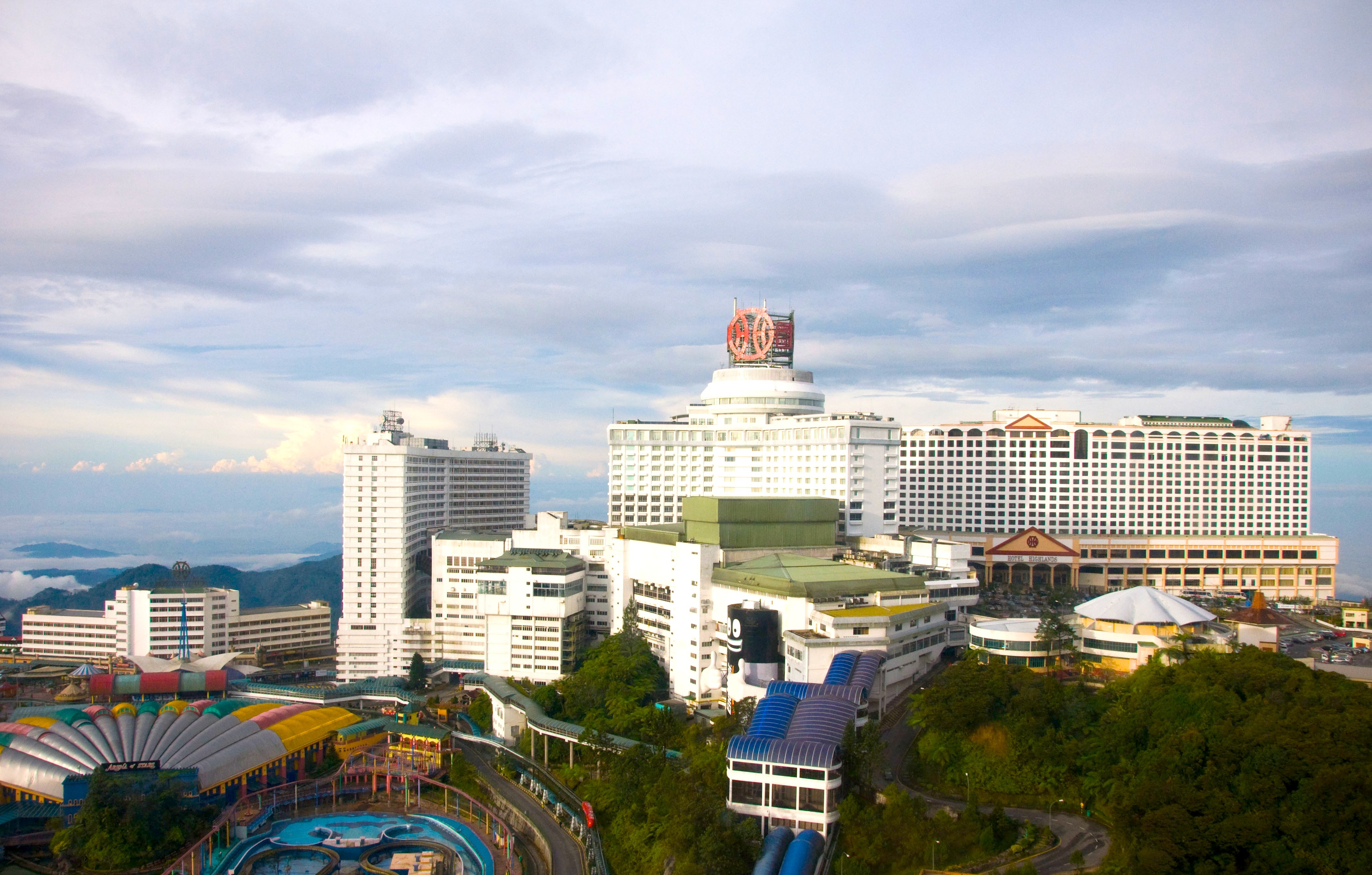
Genting Highlands

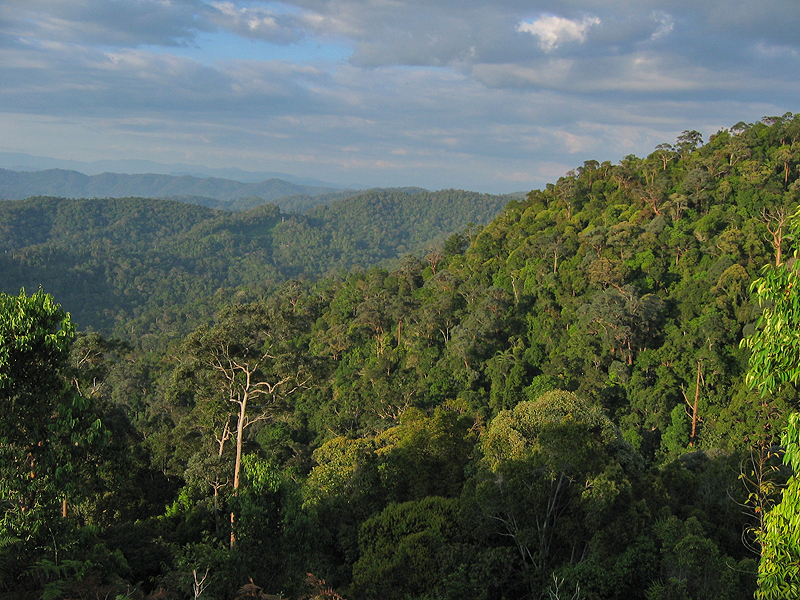
National Park

This is the list of tourist attractions in Pahang, Malaysia.

== Memorials ==
- Gohtong Memorial Park

== Museums ==
- Time Tunnel

== Nature ==
- Bera Lake
- Berkelah Falls
- Cameron Highlands
- Cherating
- Cempedak Bay
- Chini Lake
- Endau-Rompin National Park
- Mount Benom
- Mount Benum
- Mount Irau
- Mount Nuang
- Mount Tahan
- National Park
- Tioman Island
- Raub Lake Park
- Fraser's Hill

== Religious places ==
=== Buddhist temple ===
- Sam Poh Temple, Cameron Highlands

=== Chinese temple ===
- Chin Swee Caves Temple

=== Hindu temple ===
- Sri Marathandavar Bala Dhandayuthapani Alayam

=== Mosque ===
- Abu Bakar Royal Mosque
- Mohammad Noah Foundation Mosque
- Sultan Ahmad Shah State Mosque
- Tengku Ampuan Afzan Mosque

== Sport centres ==
- Darul Makmur Stadium
- Tun Abdul Razak Stadium

== Shopping centers ==
- First World Plaza
- East Cost Mall
- Berjaya Megamall

=== Theme parks and resorts ===
- Berjaya Hills Resort
- Genting Highlands

== Transportation ==
- Genting Skyway

== Towers ==
- Kuantan 188

== See also ==
- List of tourist attractions in Malaysia
