= Kemayan railway station =

Railway station in Kemayan, Malaysia

Coordinates: 3°8′7″N 102°22′13″E

Kemayan

General information
- Other names: Malay: کماين (Jawi); Chinese: 金马扬; Tamil: கெமாயான்
- Location: Kemayan, Bera District; Pahang; Malaysia
- Owner: Railway Assets Corporation
- Operator: Keretapi Tanah Melayu
- Line: East Coast Line
- Platforms: 1 side platform
- Tracks: 3

Construction
- Structure type: At-grade
- Parking: Available, free.

Services
Preceding station	Keretapi Tanah Melayu (Intercity)	Following station
Triang towards Tumpat	Ekspres Rakyat Timuran	Bahau towards Johor Bahru Sentral
Triang towards Kuala Lipis	Shuttle Timur	Bahau towards Gemas
Location

The Kemayan railway station is a Malaysian train station located in and named after the town of Kemayan in the Bera District of the state of Pahang.

== Train services ==
The station is served by the following KTM Intercity services:

- Ekspres Rakyat Timuran 26/27 Tumpat–JB Sentral
- Shuttle Timur 34/35/36/37 Gemas–Kuala Lipis
