= Malaysia Federal Route 244 =

Road in Malaysia

Federal Route 244
- Jalan Bandar Seri Jempol

Route information
- Maintained by Malaysian Public Works Department
- Length: 2.00 km (1.24 mi)

Major junctions
- Southeast end: Bandar Seri Jempol-FT10 junctions FT 10 Federal Route 10
- North end: Hospital Jempol

Location
- Country: Malaysia

Highway system
- Highways in Malaysia; Expressways; Federal; State

Jalan Bandar Seri Jempol, Federal Route 244, is a federal road in Bandar Seri Jempol, Jempol, Negeri Sembilan, Malaysia. The Kilometre Zero is at Bandar Seri Jempol-FT10 junctions.

== Features ==
At most sections, the Federal Route 244 was built under the JKR U5 road standard, allowing maximum speed limit of up to 50 km/h.

== List of junctions and towns ==
km	Exit	Junctions	To	Remarks
FT 244; 0		Bandar Seri Jempol-FT10 Junctions	North; FT 10 Temerloh; FT 10 Bera; FT 10 Teriang; FT 10 Ayer Hitam SOUTH; FT 10 Gemas; FT 10 Bahau; FT 11 Bandar Tun Abdul Razak; FT 12 Bandar Muadzam Shah	3-way intersections
		Jalan Masjid	South; Jalan Masjid; Masjid Tuanku Muhriz Daerah Jempol; Malaysian Road Transport Department (JPJ) Jempol District Headquarters	3-way intersections
		Pusat Kegiatan Guru Daerah Jempol		
		Jalan Dato Khatib	West; Jalan Dato Khatib	3-way intersections
		Jalan Serting Utama	East; Jalan Serting Utama	3-way intersections
		Jalan Harmoni	West; Jalan Harmoni	3-way intersections
		Majlis Daerah Jempol (MDJempol) main headquarters		
		Pos Malaysia Bandar Seri Jempol post office		
		PPANS Jempol District Library		
		Hospital Jempol	Hospital Jempol	3-way intersections
