= Triang railway station =

Railway station in Teriang, Malaysia

Coordinates: 3°14′44″N 102°24′42″E

Triang

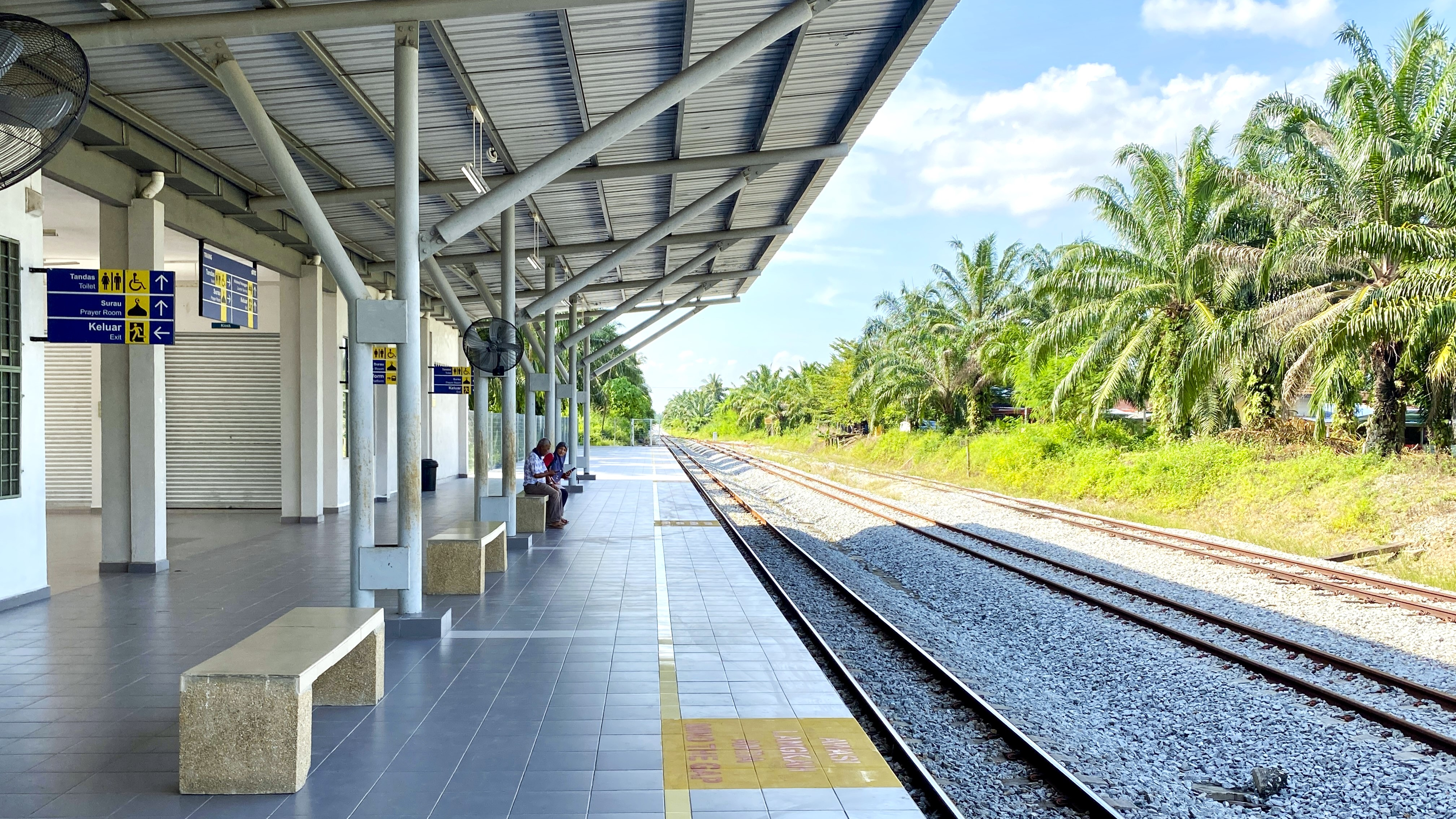

General information
- Other names: Malay: ترياڠ (Jawi); Chinese: 直凉; Tamil: திரியாங்
- Location: Teriang, Bera District; Pahang; Malaysia
- Owner: Railway Assets Corporation
- Operator: Keretapi Tanah Melayu
- Line: East Coast Line
- Platforms: 1 side platform
- Tracks: 3

Construction
- Structure type: At-grade
- Parking: Available, free.
- Accessible: Yes

History
- Opened: 1 October 1910

Services
Preceding station	Keretapi Tanah Melayu (Intercity)	Following station
Mentakab towards Tumpat	Ekspres Rakyat Timuran	Kemayan towards Johor Bahru Sentral
Mengkarak towards Kuala Lipis	Shuttle Timur	Kemayan towards Gemas
Location

The Triang railway station is a Malaysian train station located at and named after the town of Triang in the Bera District of the state Pahang.

== Train services ==
The station is served by the following KTM Intercity services:

- Ekspres Rakyat Timuran 26/27 Tumpat–JB Sentral
- Shuttle Timur 34/35/36/37 Gemas-Kuala Lipis
