= Bahau railway station =

Railway station in Jempol, Negeri Sembilan, Malaysia

Coordinates: 2°48′41.076″N 102°24′13.212″E

Bahau

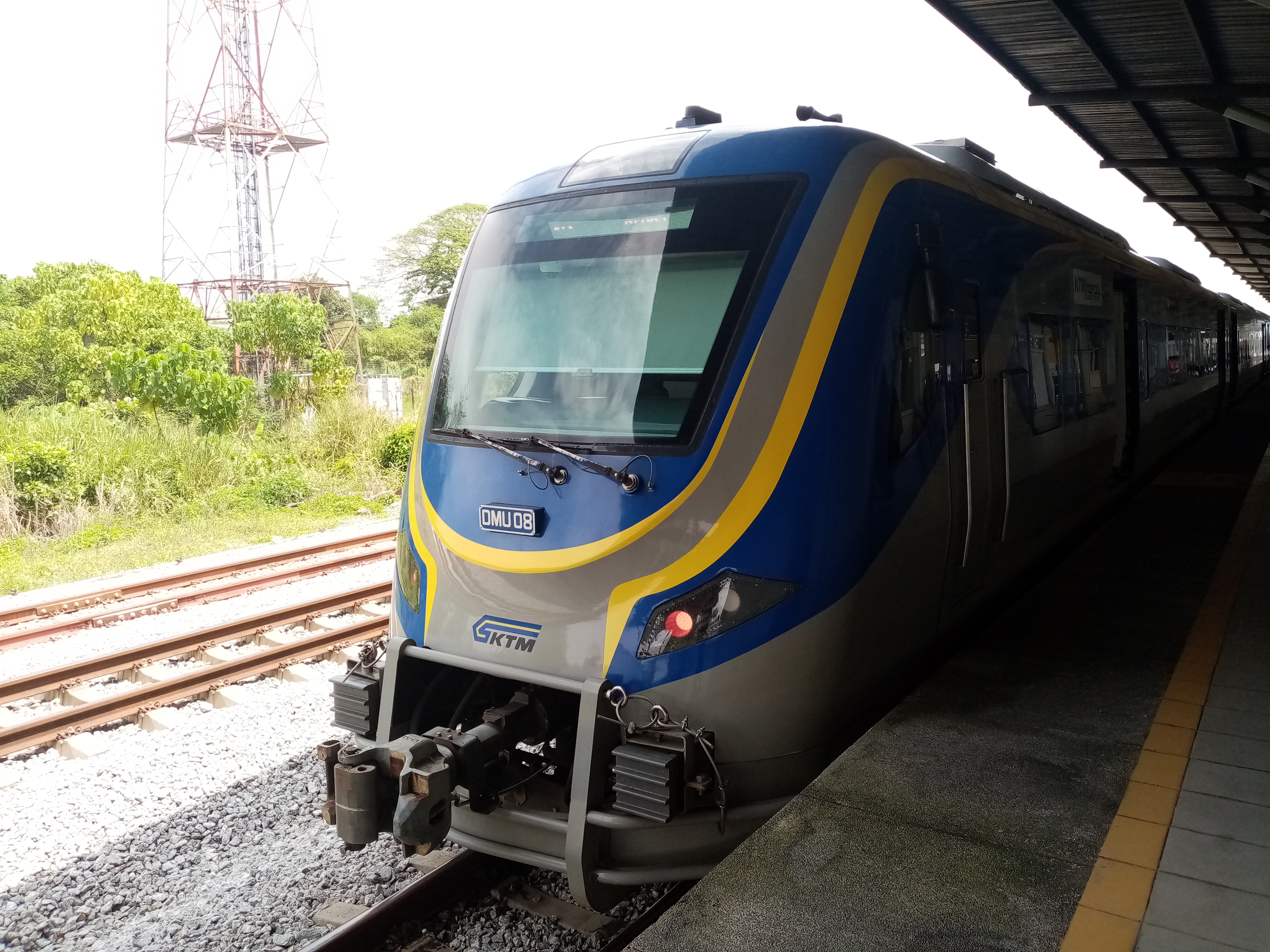
- KTM Class 61 train at Bahau station

General information
- Other names: Malay: بهاو (Jawi); Chinese: 马口; Tamil: பகாவ்
- Location: Bahau, Jempol District; Negeri Sembilan; Malaysia
- Owner: Railway Assets Corporation
- Operator: Keretapi Tanah Melayu
- Line: East Coast Line
- Platforms: 1 side platform
- Tracks: 3

History
- Opened: 4 April 1910
- Rebuilt: 2019

Services
Preceding station	Keretapi Tanah Melayu (Intercity)	Following station
Kemayan towards Tumpat	Ekspres Rakyat Timuran	Gemas towards Johor Bahru Sentral
Kemayan towards Kuala Lipis	Shuttle Timur	Gemas Terminus
Location

The Bahau railway station is a Malaysian train station located in and named after the town of Bahau in the Jempol District of the state Negeri Sembilan. Located near Taman Kwang Hup, it is one of the major railway stations of Keretapi Tanah Melayu's (KTM) East Coast Line.

The station is currently the only operational station in Negeri Sembilan that is not part of KTM's electrified and double-tracked West Coast Line.

== Train services ==
The station is served by the following KTM Intercity services:

- Ekspres Rakyat Timuran 26/27 Tumpat–JB Sentral
- Shuttle Timur 34/35/36/37 Gemas–Kuala Lipis

Prior to the absorption of KTM ETS services into the KTM Intercity division, the station previously ran mail trains to and from Tumpat and Gemas, with express trains from Tanjong Pagar (until July 2011) and Woodlands in Singapore on its schedule.
