= Tengku Ampuan Afzan Mosque =

Mosque in Kuantan, Pahang, Malaysia

- Masjid Tengku Ampuan Afzan
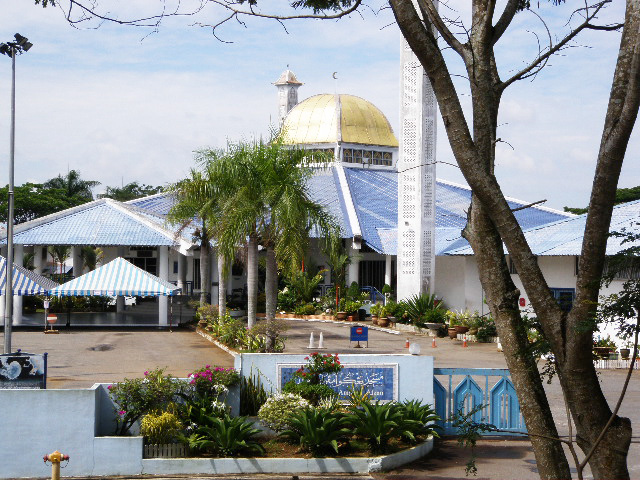

- Location within Pahang

Religion
- Affiliation: Islam
- Branch/tradition: Sunni

Location
- Location: Bandar Indera Mahkota, Kuantan, Pahang, Malaysia
- Coordinates: 3°49′24.0″N 103°18′17.9″E

Architecture
- Type: mosque
- Completed: 1988
- Minaret: 4

The Tengku Ampuan Afzan Mosque (Malay: Masjid Tengku Ampuan Afzan) is a mosque located at Bandar Indera Mahkota in Kuantan, Pahang, Malaysia.

== See also ==
- Islam in Malaysia
