= Rompin, Negeri Sembilan =

Rompin
- Town
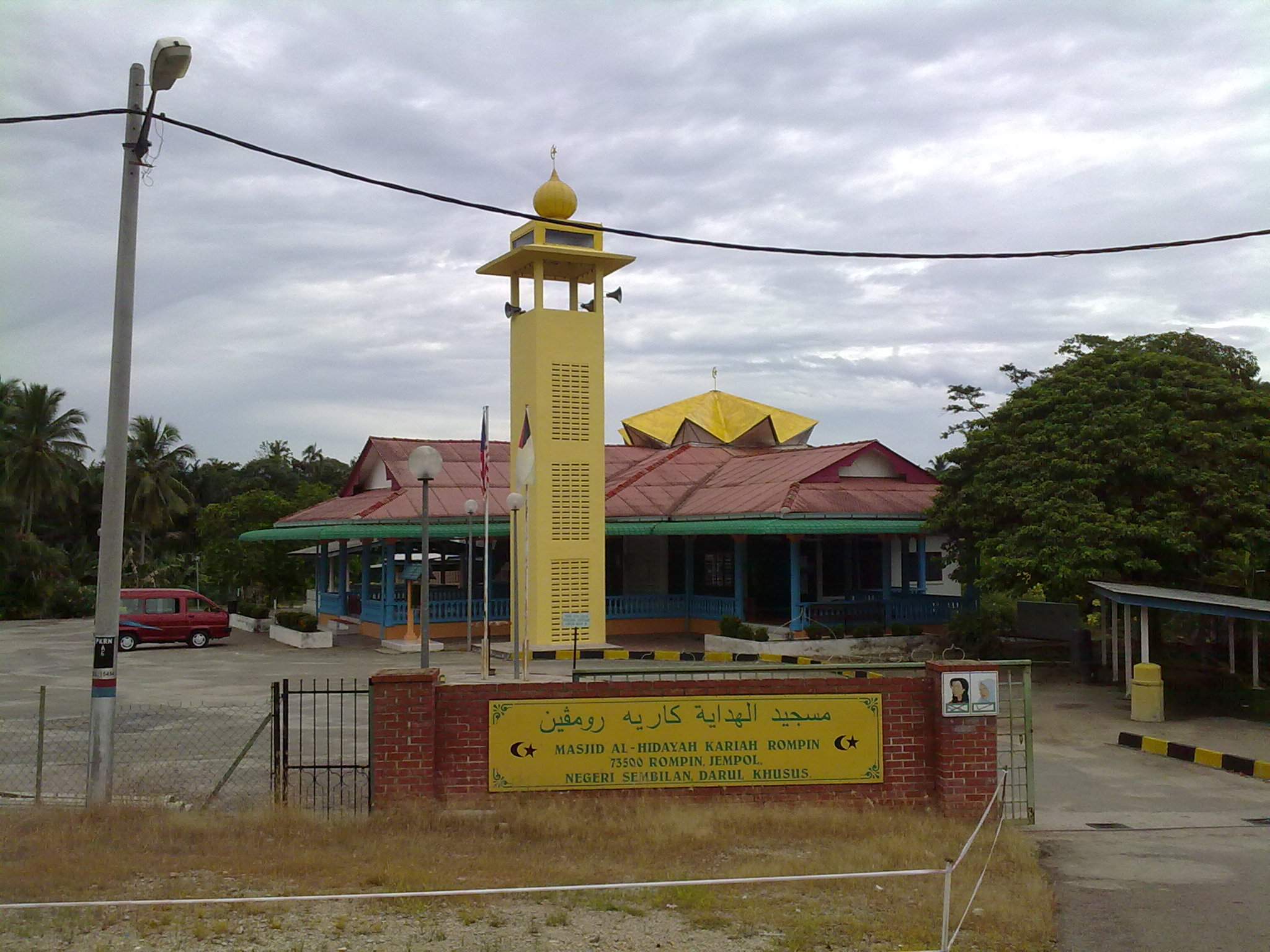
- Rompin town mosque

- Location of Rompin Rompin (Peninsular Malaysia) Rompin (Malaysia)
- Coordinates: 2°42′0″N 102°30′0″E
- Country: Malaysia
- State: Negeri Sembilan
- District: Jempol
- Luak: Johol
- Time zone: UTC+8 (MYT)
- Postal code: 73500

Rompin in Jempol District

Rompin is a small town located in Jempol District, Negeri Sembilan, Malaysia, on the banks of the Muar River. Rompin developed as a town for the local community nearby. The village around Rompin town is Kampung Baru Rompin, Kampung Rompin, Kampung Balai Cina, and Kampung Tanah Panjis.

The east coastal railway line of the KTMB runs through Rompin.
