= Paloh Hinai =

Paloh Hinai is a small town in Pekan District, Pahang, Malaysia, located along the Pahang River.

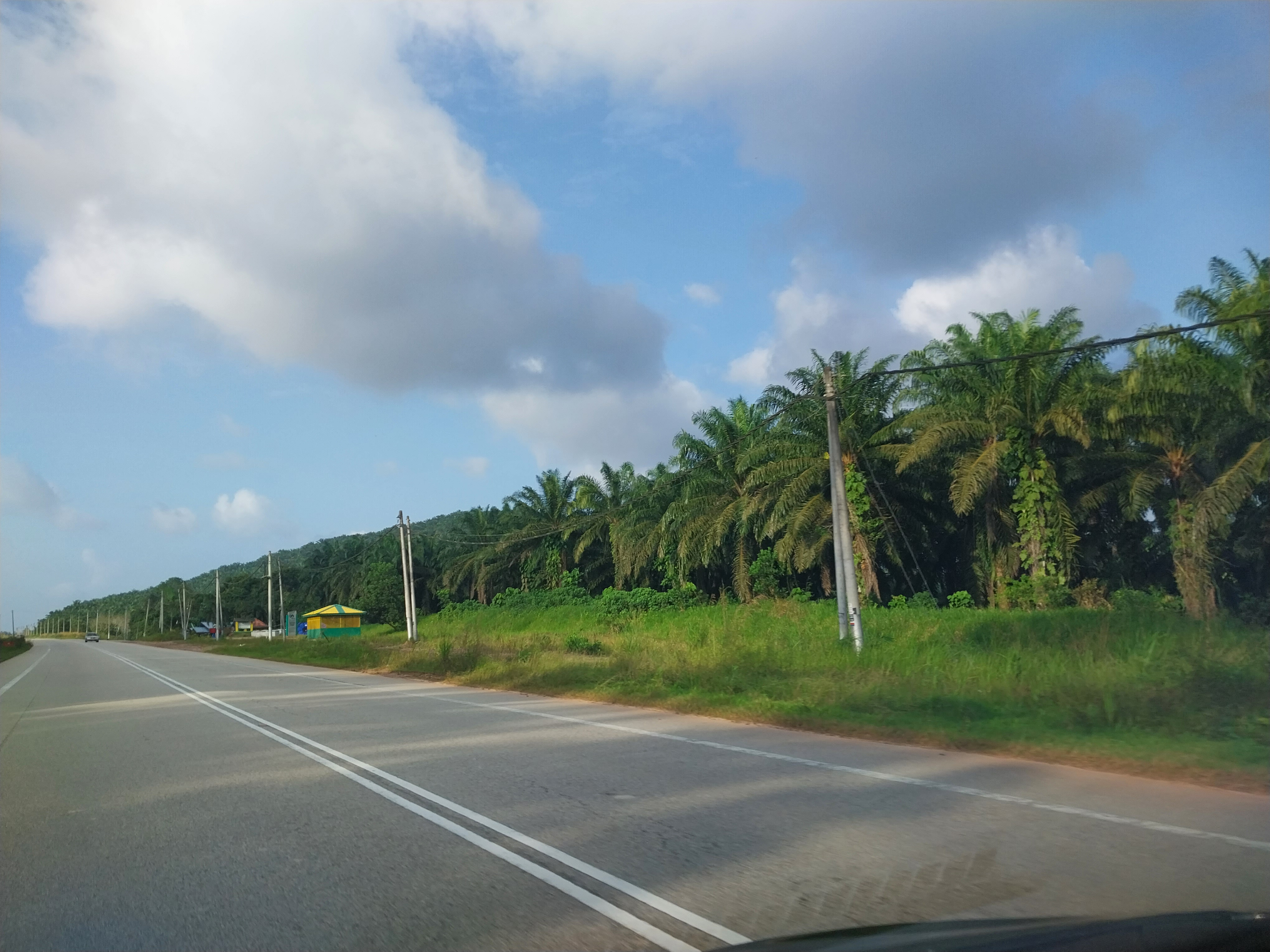
Oil palm plantation in Paloh Hinai, Pahang as seen from main road.

== See also ==
- List of tourist attractions in Pahang
