= Bandar Seri Jempol =

Town in Negeri Sembilan, Malaysia

Coordinates: 2.911585°N 102.3912776°E

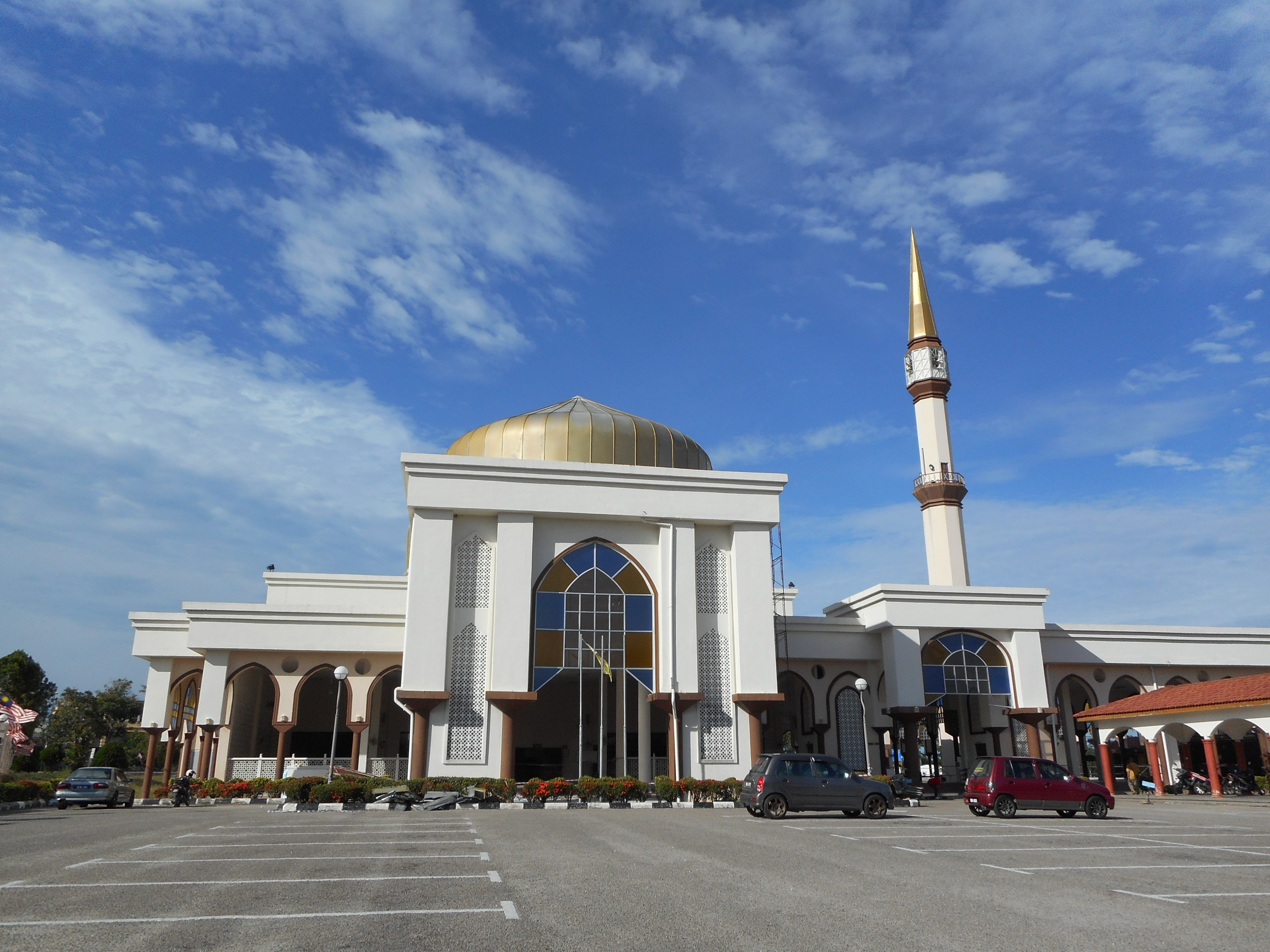
Tuanku Muhriz Mosque, Bandar Seri Jempol

Bandar Seri Jempol in Jempol District

Bandar Seri Jempol or Bandar Baru Serting is a town and planned capital of Jempol District, Negeri Sembilan, Malaysia.

== Facilities ==
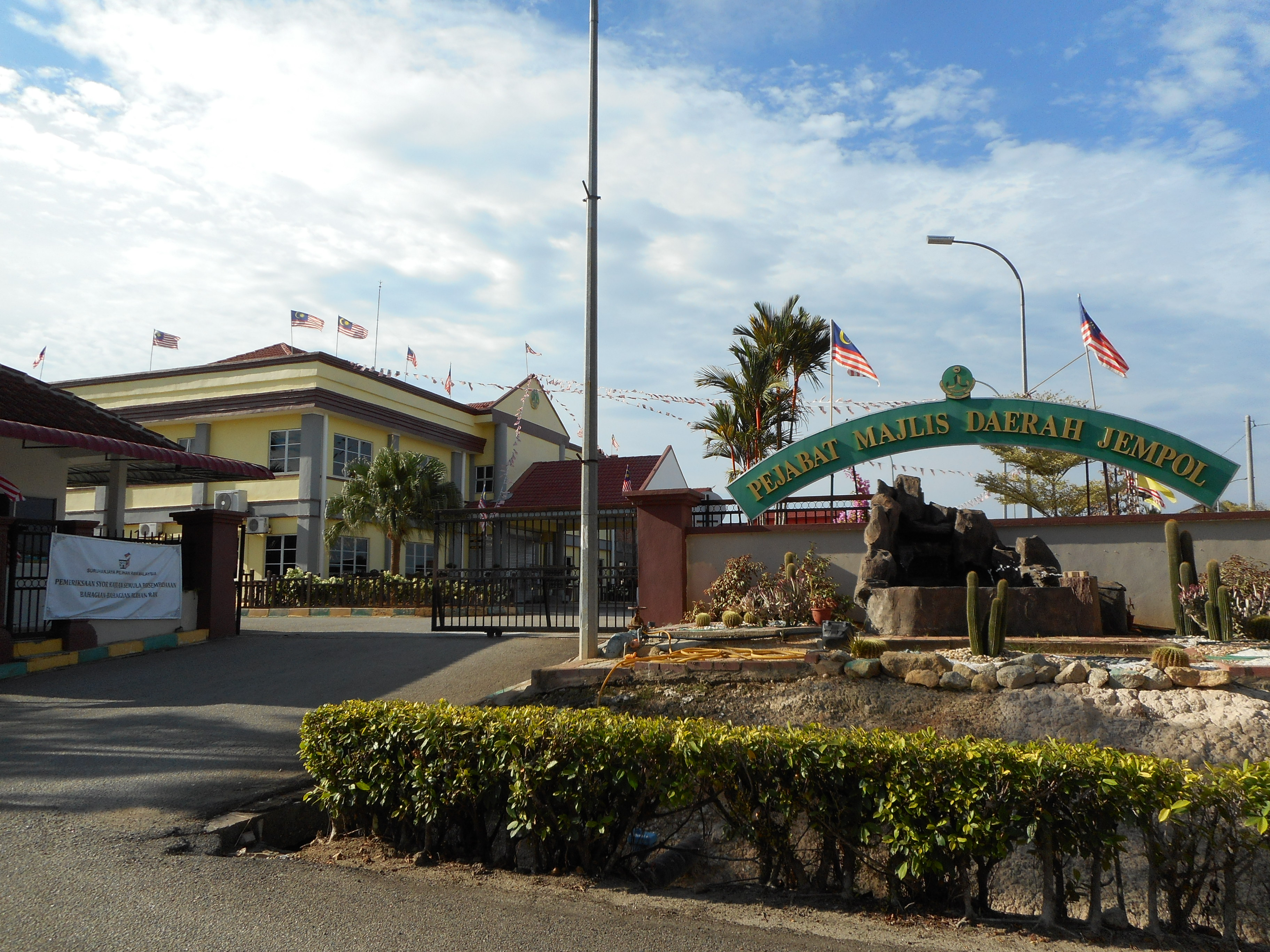
Jempol Municipal Council Headquarters

- Jempol District Mosque
- Jempol District and Land Office
- Jempol Municipal Council (MPJL) main headquarters
- Jempol District Hospital
- Jempol Police District Headquarters (IPD Jempol)
- Jempol Public Library
