= Bera District =

- District of Pahang
- Daerah Bera
- Seal
- Interactive map of Bera District
- Location of Bera District in Malaysia
- Coordinates: 3°16′N 102°27′E
- Country: Malaysia
- State: Pahang
- Seat: Bandar Bera
- Local area government(s): Bera District Council

Government
  - District officer: Razihan Adzharuddin

Area
  - Total: 2,214.44 km^{2} (855.00 sq mi)

Population (2010)
  - Total: 90,304
  - Density: 40.780/km^{2} (105.62/sq mi)
- Time zone: UTC+8 (MST)
  - Summer (DST): UTC+8 (Not observed)
- Postcode: 28xxx
- Calling code: +6-09
- Vehicle registration plates: C

The Bera District is a district in southwestern Pahang, Malaysia, bordering Negeri Sembilan and Johor.

== Background ==
Bera district was founded on January 1, 1992, detaching it from Temerloh District.Once considered as problematic area (illegal land exploration), Bera emerged as an important district especially in the agriculture sector.

== Etymology ==
The district got its name from Malaysia's largest freshwater lake, Tasik Bera. According to the Orang Asli of the Semelai tribe, Bera derived its name from a type of seaweed known as Reba.

When the northern part of the district was ruled by one of the nine founding chiefdoms of Negeri Sembilan, it was known as "Ulu Pahang" (the back part of Pahang).

== Geography ==
Located in the south-western corner of Pahang, the district borders Temerloh District and Maran District on the north, Rompin District on the east, Bentong District on the west, Jempol District of Negeri Sembilan on the south-west and Segamat District of Johor on the south-east.

Bera district is known for Bera Lake, a freshwater lake and its surrounding wetlands, that has been protected under the Ramsar Convention since November 1994.

The major towns in Bera are Bandar Bera and Teriang. Other towns include Mengkuang, Kemayan, Kerayong and Mengkarak.

From the south, KTM tracks enter Pahang state via this constituency, stopping at Kemayan, Triang and Mengkarak stations.

== Demographics ==
Historical population
Year	Pop.	±%
2000	77,685	—
2010	94,105	+21.1%
2020	110,592	+17.5%
Figures before 1992 is included under Temerloh District. Source:

The following is based on Department of Statistics Malaysia 2010 census.

Ethnic groups in Bera, 2010 census
Ethnicity	Population	Percentage
Bumiputera	60,696	67.2%
Chinese	24,511	27.1%
Indian	4,739	5.2%
Others	358	0.4%
Total	90,304	100%

== Education ==
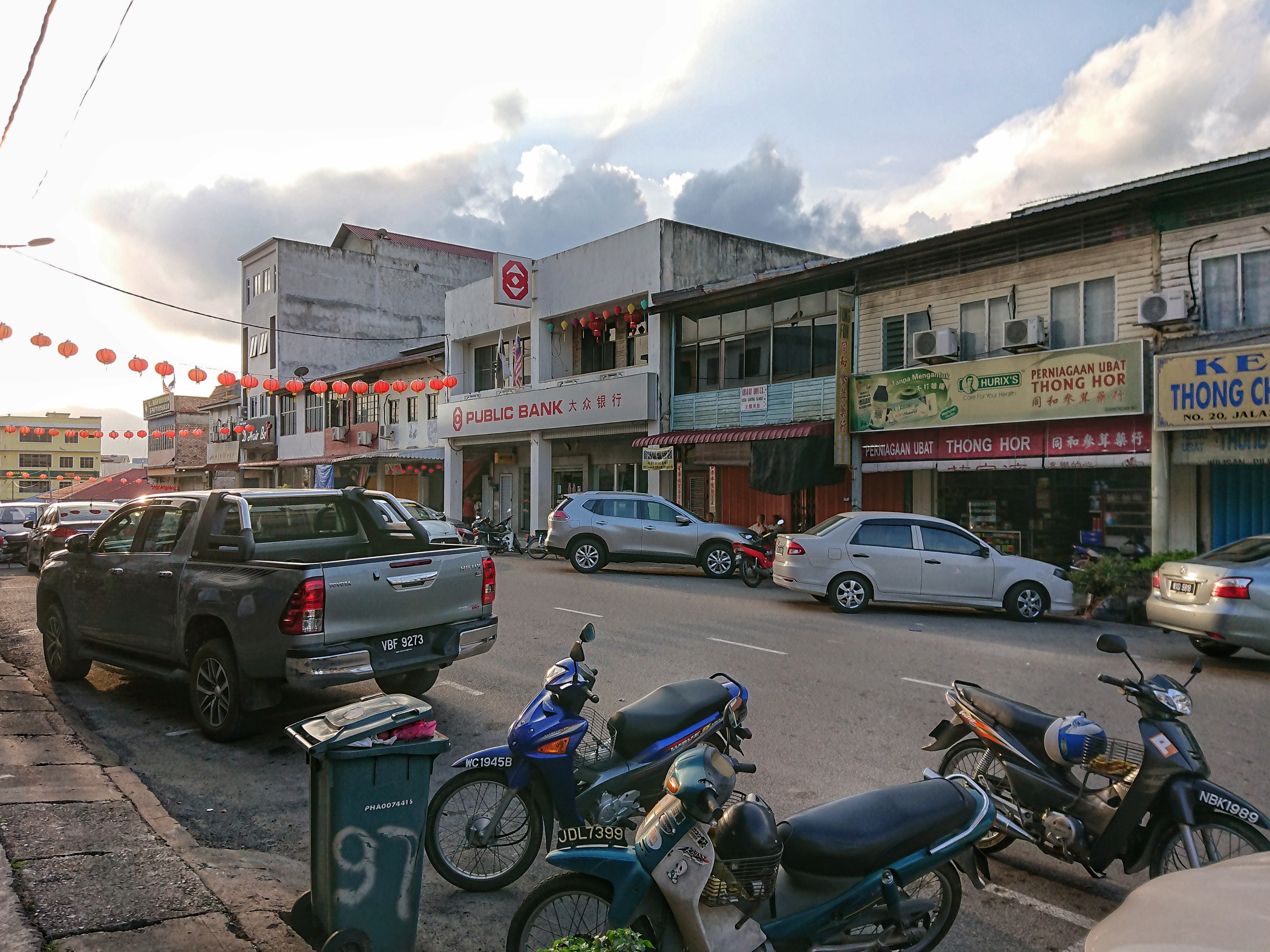
Kemayan, near the border with Negeri Sembilan

There are 38 primary schools, which include national schools, Chinese-medium schools and Indian-medium schools, in Bera district. As for secondary schools, there are 10 of them.

== Federal Parliament and State Assembly Seats ==
Though Bera was made into a separate district in 1992, it wasn't given a vote in the parliament until 2004. Previously Bera was represented in the national parliament as part of Temerloh.

Ismail Sabri Yaakob, the former Prime Minister of Malaysia, is the member of parliament.

Bera district representative in the Federal Parliament (Dewan Rakyat)

Parliament	Seat Name	Member of Parliament	Party
P90	Bera	Ismail Sabri Yaakob	BN (UMNO)

List of Bera district representatives in the State Legislative Assembly (Dewan Undangan Negeri)

Parliament	State	Seat Name	State Assemblyman	Party
P90	N37	Guai	Sabariah Saidan	BN (UMNO)
P90	N38	Triang	Leong Yu Man	PH (DAP)
P90	N39	Kemayan	Khairulnizam Mohamad Zuldin	BN (UMNO)

== Subdistricts ==
Map of Bera district.

Bera has 2 mukim or subdistricts.

- Bera (165,094 Ha)
- Teriang (56,350 Ha) (Capital)

== See also ==
- Districts of Malaysia
