= Mengkarak =

- Town

Other transcription(s)
  - Chinese: 明加叻
- Interactive map of Mengkarak
- Coordinates: 3°20′N 102°25′E
- Country: Malaysia
- State: Pahang
- District: Bera

Government
  - Local government: Bera District Council
- Time zone: UTC+8 (MST)
  - Summer (DST): Not observed
- Postal code: 28200
- Website: mdbera.gov.my

Mengkarak in Bera District

Mengkarak is a small town in Bera District, Pahang, Malaysia.
