= Chenor =

Coordinates: 3°29′N 102°36′E

- Mukim
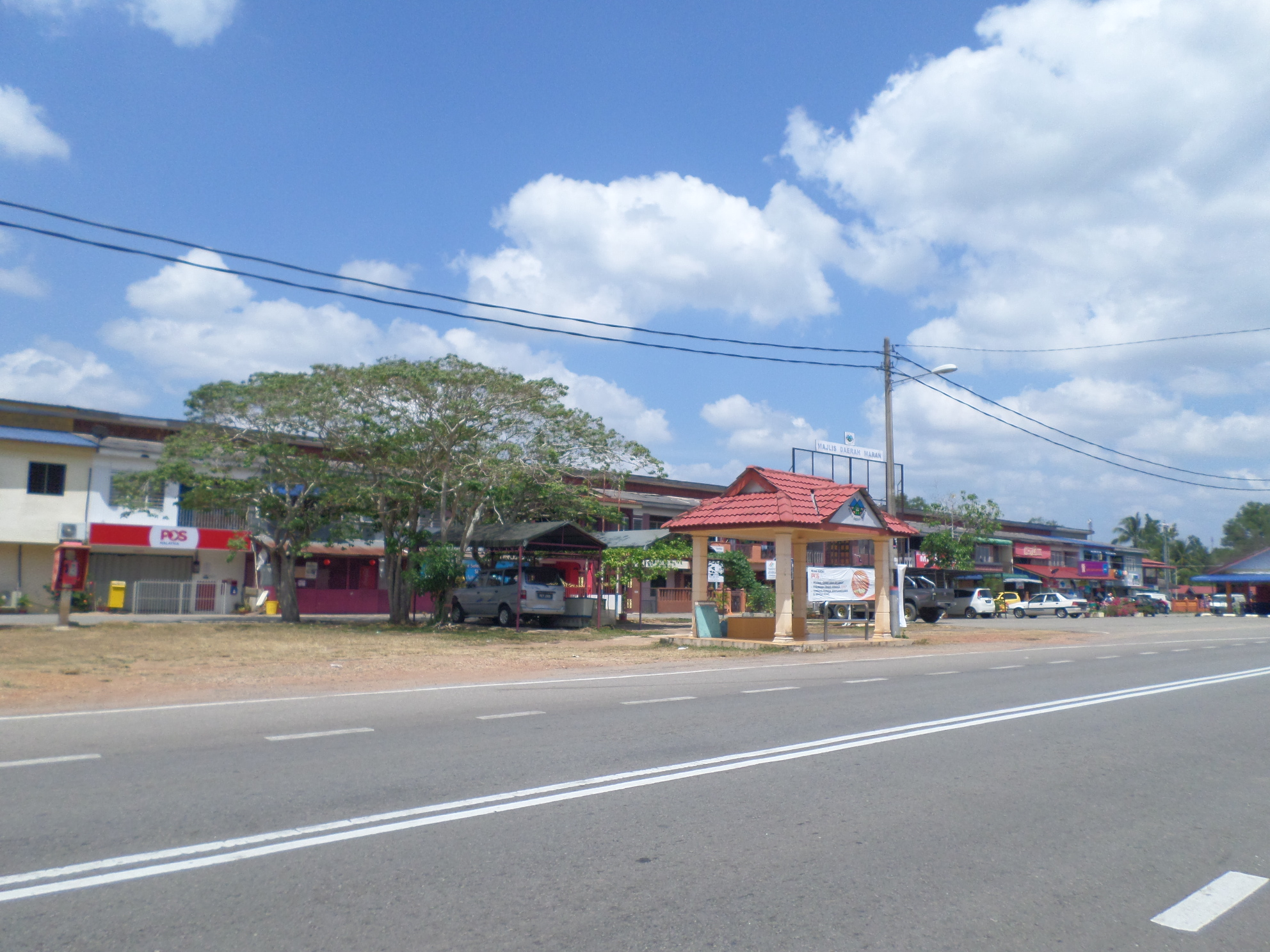
- Interactive map of Chenor
- Country: Malaysia
- State: Pahang
- District: Maran

Chenor is a mukim in Maran District, Pahang, Malaysia. It is formed from the aggregation of several villages namely, RPSB Bukit Kening, Kampung Kening, Kampung Batu Bor, Kampung Sekara, Kampung Baru, Kampung Huma Luas, Kampung Pesagi, Kampung Chenor Seberang, Kampung Tebing Tembah dan Kampung Nyak Kertau.
