= Bandar Bera =

Town in Pahang, Malaysia

Coordinates: 3°15′54.9″N 102°26′28.9″E

Bandar Bera (can be called as Bera Town or Bandar Kerayong) is a town and district capital of Bera District, Pahang, Malaysia.
