= Triang, Bera =

Coordinates: 3°14′N 102°25′E

Triang in Bera District

Triang, alt. Teriang (Jawi: ترياڠ) is a town and a mukim (township) in Bera District, southwestern Pahang, Malaysia. It is the largest settlement in the district.

== Etymology ==
Its name was derived from Sungai Triang (Triang River), a tributary of the Pahang River, the longest river in Peninsular Malaysia.

== Politics ==
Triang was part of Temerloh District until 1992, when the southern half was carved out as the new Bera District, named after the nearby Bera Lake. Triang continued to be part of Temerloh constituency of the Malaysian parliament until 2004.

Triang is one of three constituencies of the Pahang State Legislative Assembly within the borders of the parliamentary constituency of Bera, the other two being Guai and Kemayan. The seat was as of 2015 held by Leong Yu Man of the DAP.

Ismail Sabri Yaakob, the former Prime Minister of Malaysia, is currently the Member of Parliament for Bera.
