= Kemayan =

Coordinates: 3°08′N 102°22′E

- Town
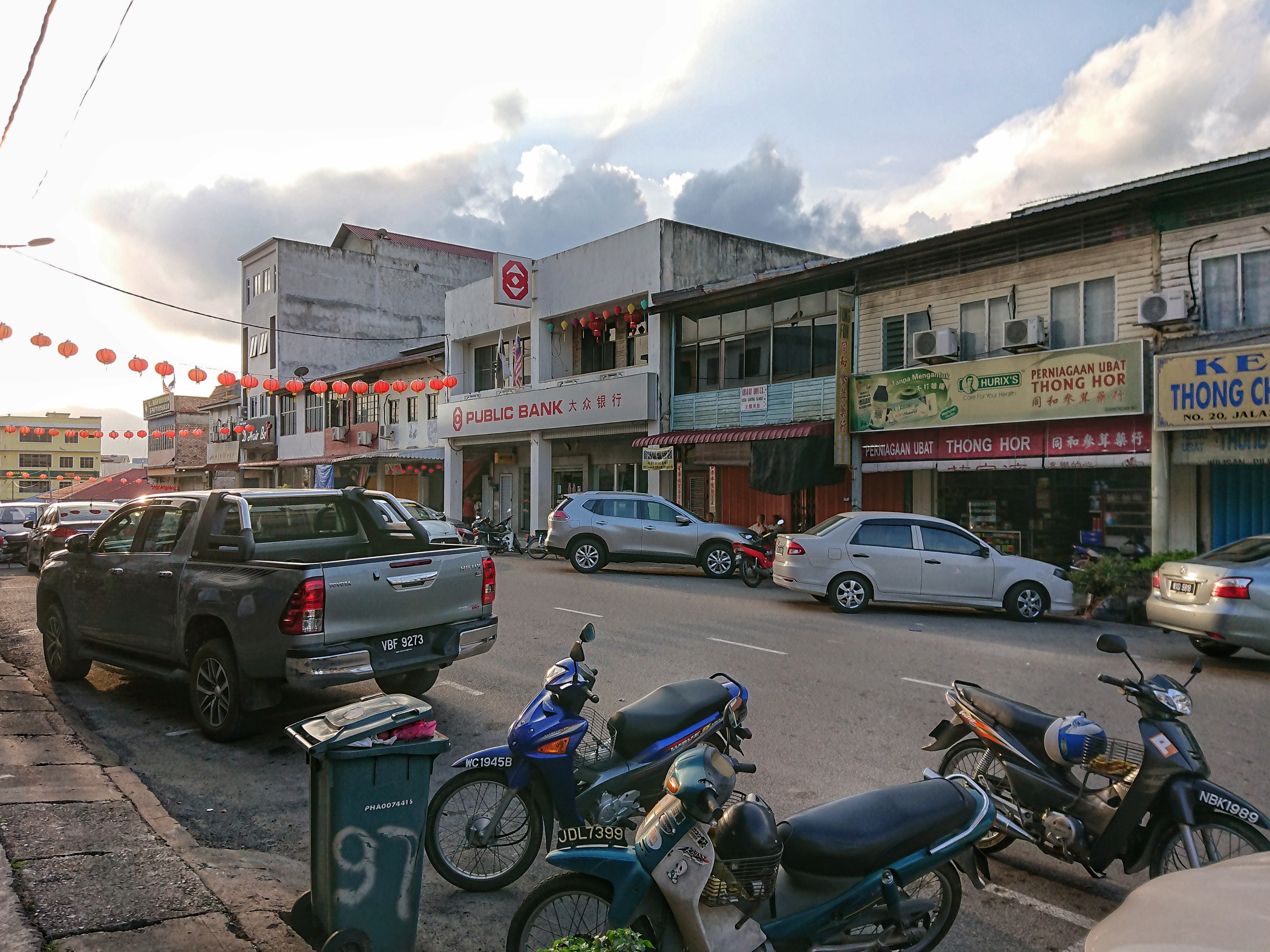
- Jalan Besar in Kemayan in 2019.
- Interactive map of Kemayan
- Country: Malaysia
- State: Pahang
- District: Bera District

Kemayan is a small town in Bera District, Pahang, Malaysia.

== Demographics ==
Most residents are Chinese.

== Gallery ==
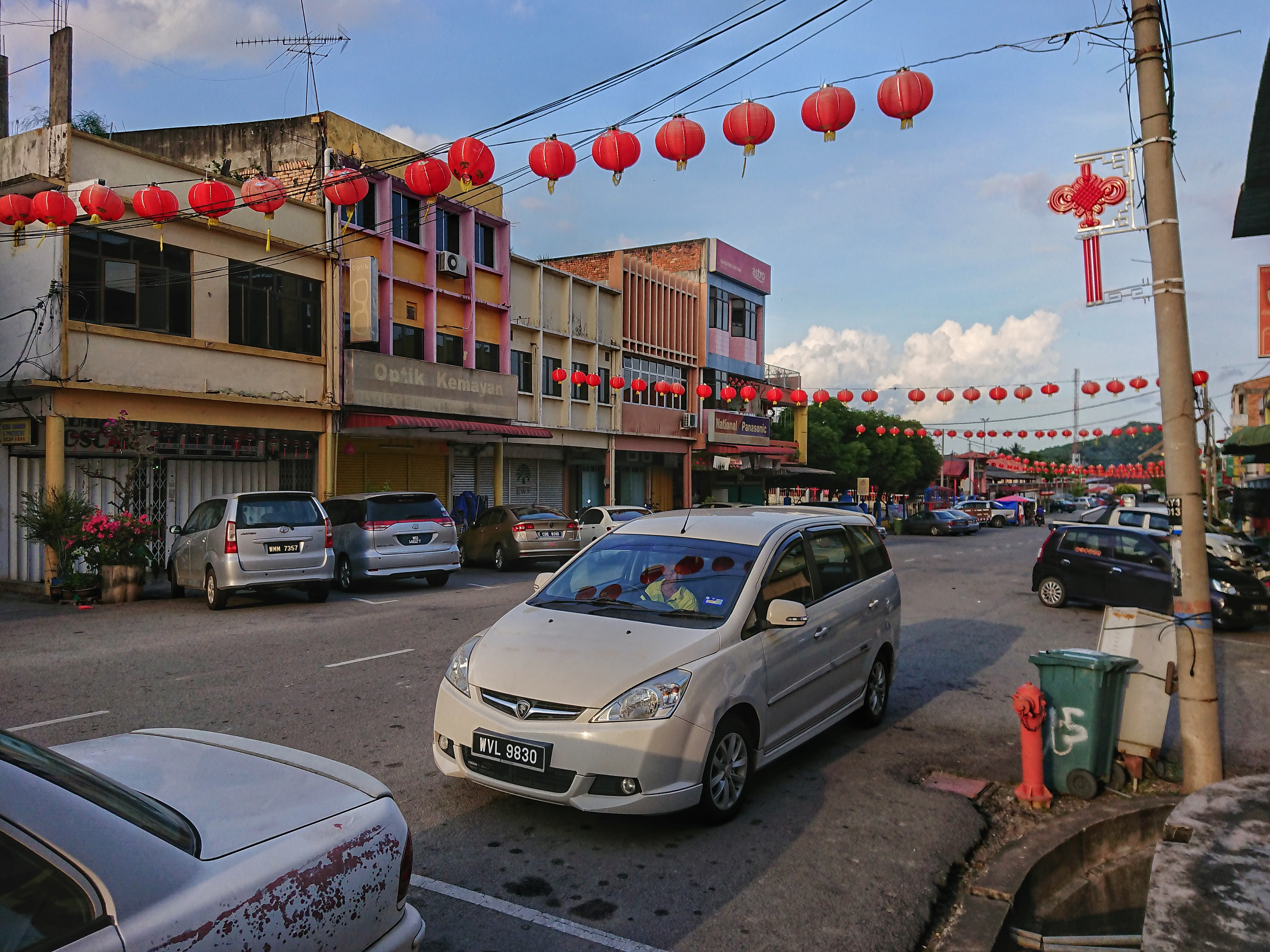
Chinese New Year decorations in Jalan Besar, Kemayan (2019).

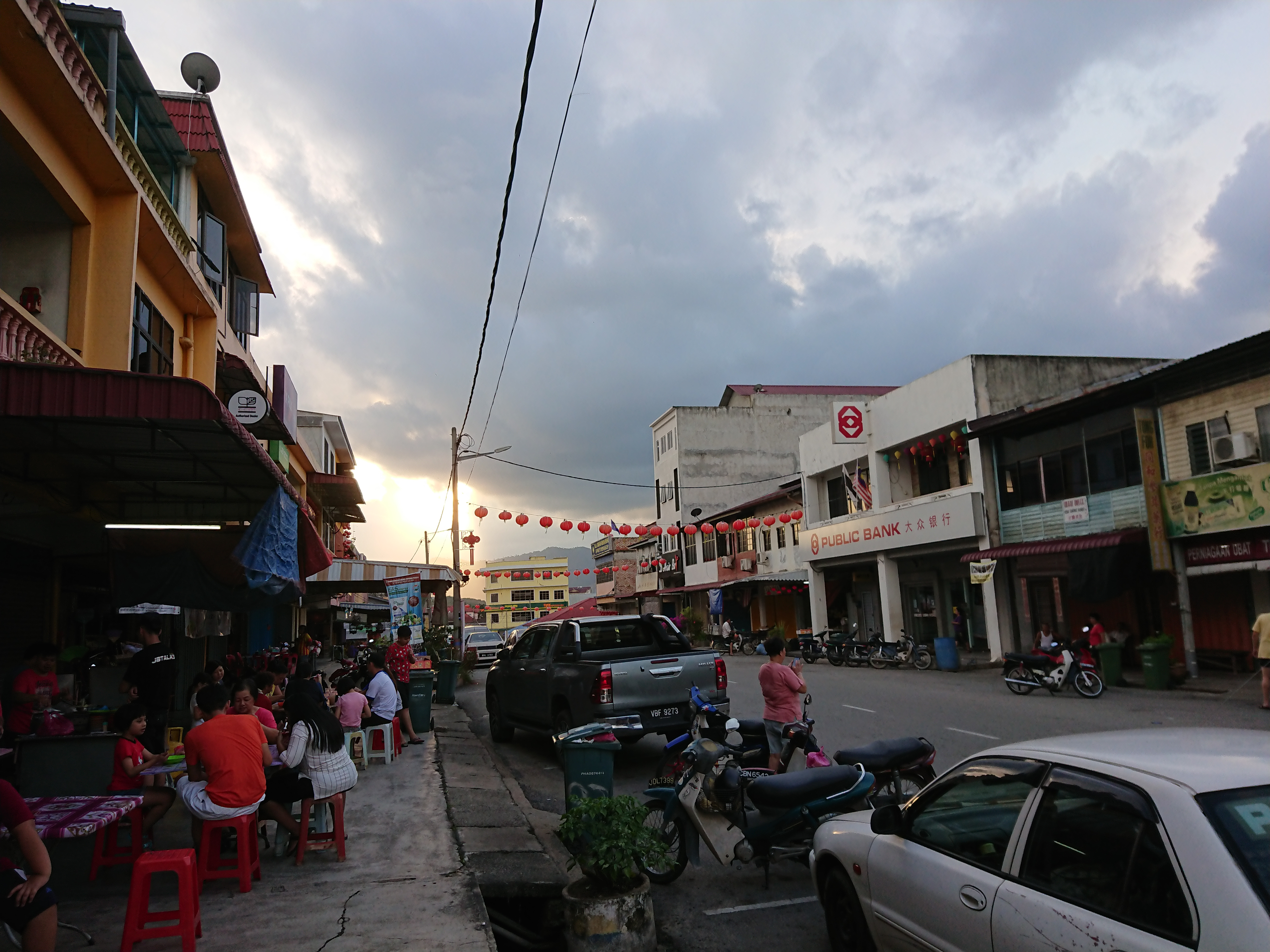
Town centre of Kemayan.
