= Chini Lake =

Lake in Pahang, Malaysia

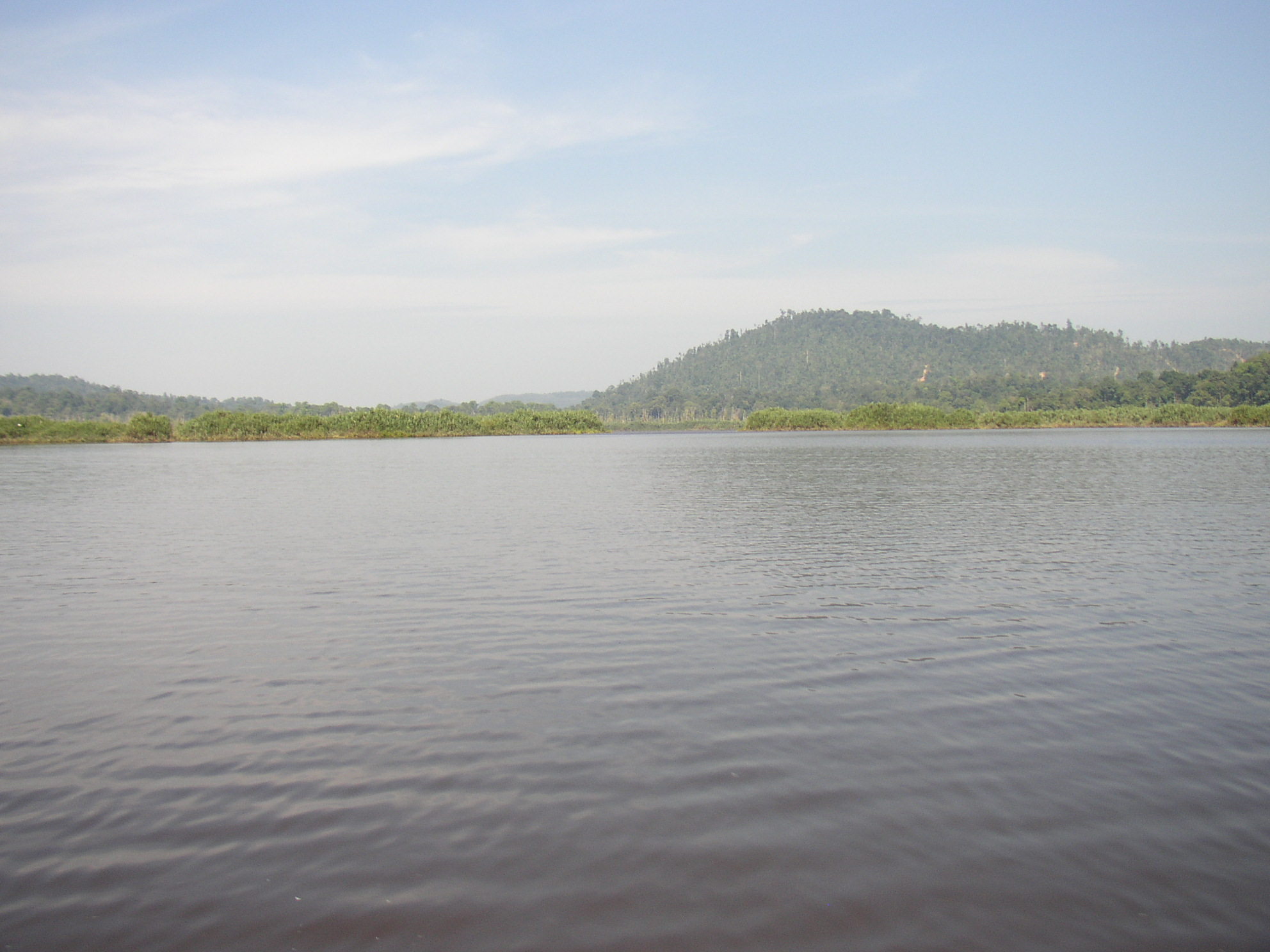

- Location within Malaysia
- Location: Pekan District, Pahang
- Coordinates: 3°26′N 102°55′E
- Primary outflows: Chini River
- Basin countries: Malaysia
- Surface area: 12,565 acres (5,085 ha)

Chini Lake (Malay: Tasik Chini) is a lake in Pekan District, Pahang, Malaysia. The lake shores are inhabited by the Jakun branch of the Orang Asli, indigenous ethnic groups of Malaysia.

The 12,565-acre (5,085-hectare) Tasik Chini is the second largest fresh water lake in Peninsular Malaysia and is made up of a series of 12 lakes. Chini River, which drains from the lake, flows into Pahang River. The river is dammed to maintain the lake's depth during the dry season. However, this has disrupted the natural ecology of the lake and caused the death of trees on its shores due to elevated water level.

Tasik Chini is one of the UNESCO Biosphere Reserve status sites in Peninsular Malaysia, while the other is Crocker Range in East Malaysia

== Flora and fauna ==
The lake is also endowed with a rich bio-diversified lush tropical wilderness that is home to 138 species of flora, 300 species of non-aquatic live and 144 species of fresh water fish. Between August and September the lake is transformed into a floating garden with thousands of white and pink lotus flowers covering the surface.

== Legends ==
The lake offers tranquil and peaceful surroundings steeped in myths and legends that have remained unexplained to this day. According to an Orang Asli legend, the lake is inhabited by a dragon called the Naga Seri Gumum (sometimes referred to as "Malaysia's Loch Ness Monster"). It is believed to contain an ancient sunken Khmer city at the bottom of the lake.

== Pollution ==
Bukit Ketaya, a hill next to the lake is the site of mining of iron ore. The Orang Asli (indigenous people) who live on the banks of Tasik Chini complain that the lake has become polluted. A community leader of an Orang Asli village, Tok Batin Awang Alok, said that logging and ore mining activities have create pollution and caused problems for local residents. Children who bathe in the lake complain of itchiness. Fish caught in the lake have become unfit to eat. The Orang Asli people cannot go to areas to collect roots used in traditional medicine because the areas have been closed for mining.

Dr Hedzri Adnan of Asian Public Intellectuals said that rapid changes at the lake might cause the ecosystem to collapse by 2030. Transparency International's secretary-general Josie Fernandez also said that the lake also risked losing its UNESCO Biosphere Reserve status. However, the Mentri Besar of Pahang, Adnan Yaakob said that the state Health Department found that the water quality to be normal after a three-month study while the muddy waters only occurred near the state Islamic and Malay Customs Council and RISDA's plantations near the lake.

In 2021, the government announced an end to mining around the lake.

== Pictures ==
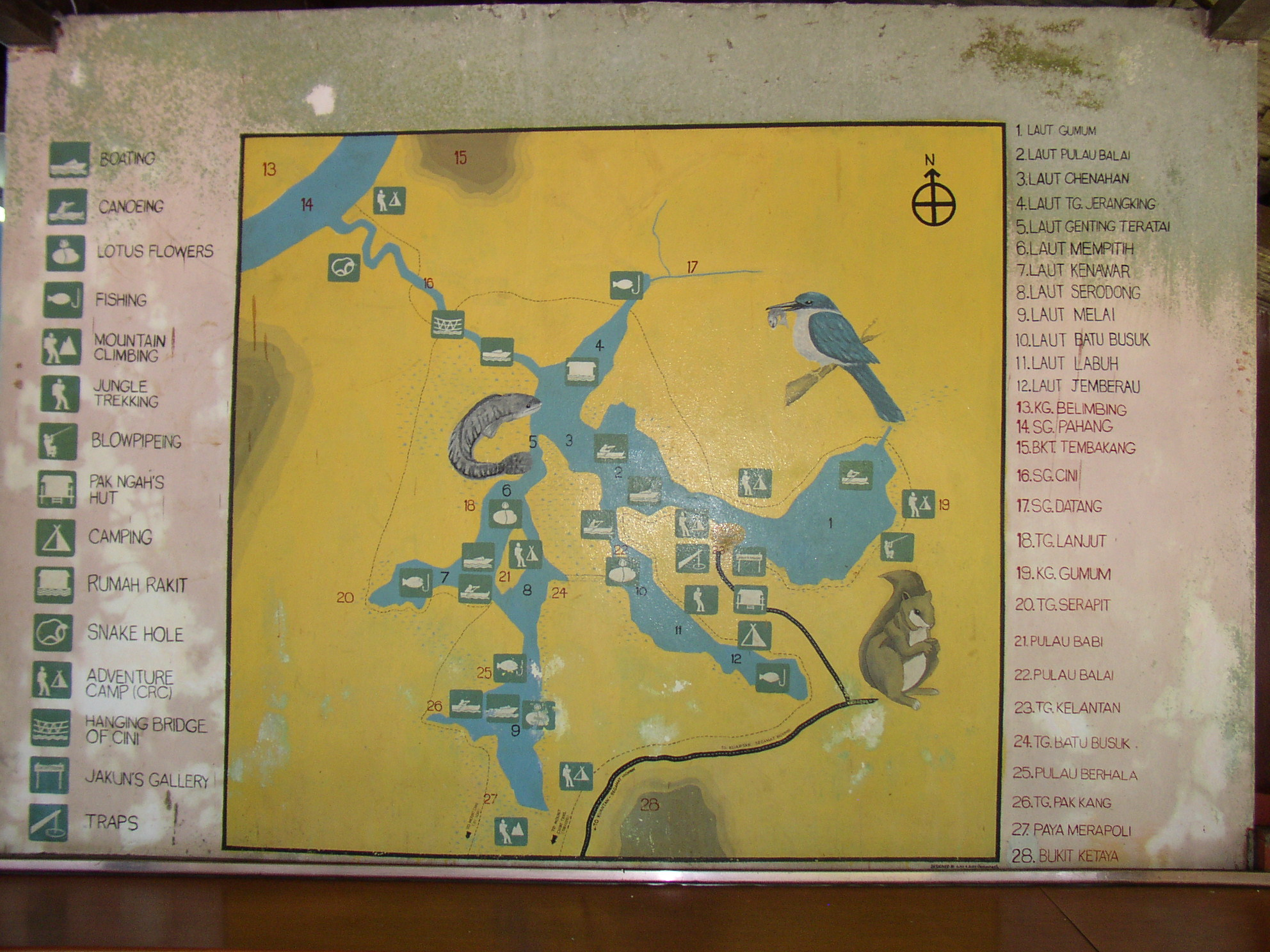
Information board

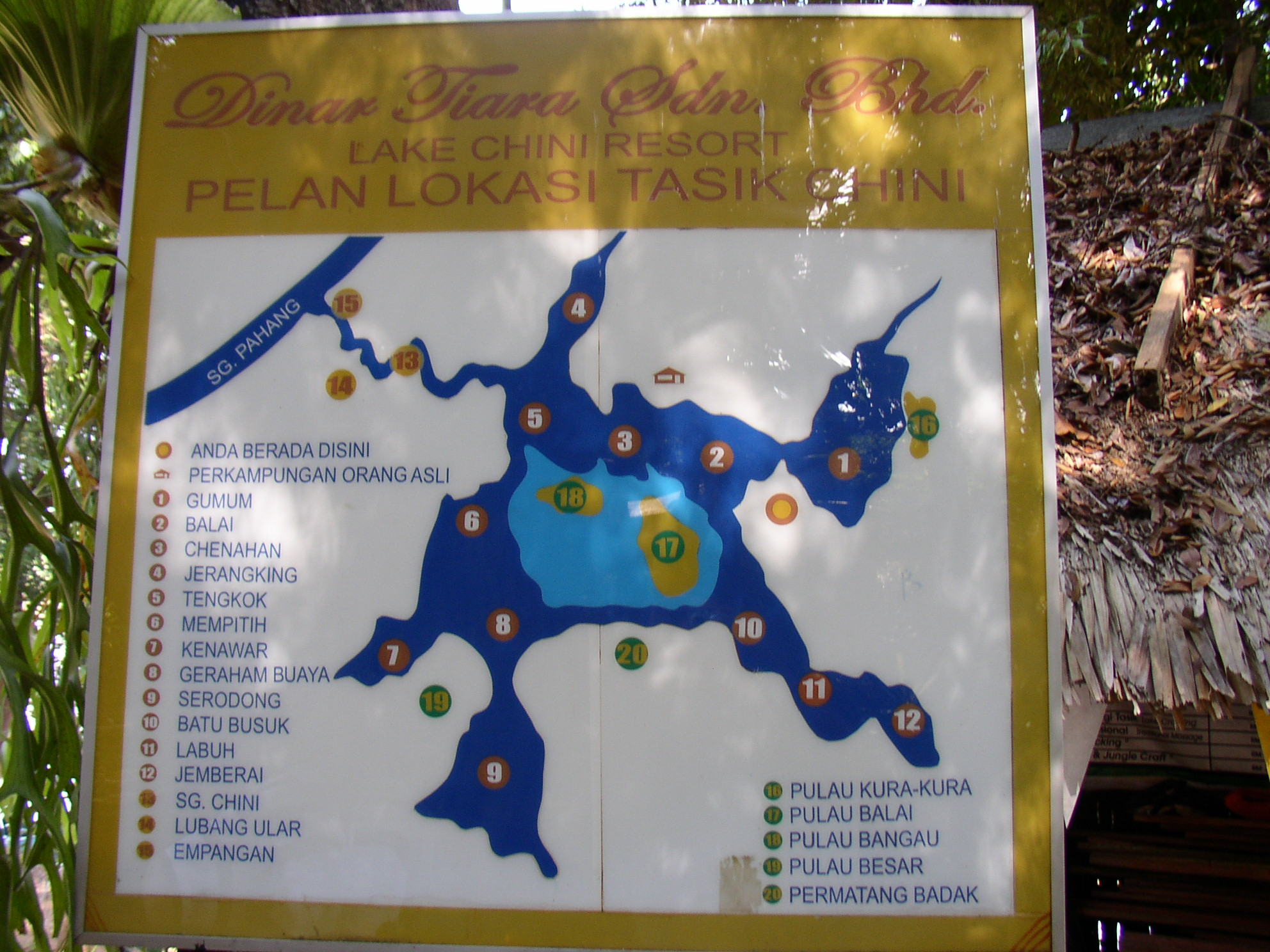
Tourist board at Chini Lake

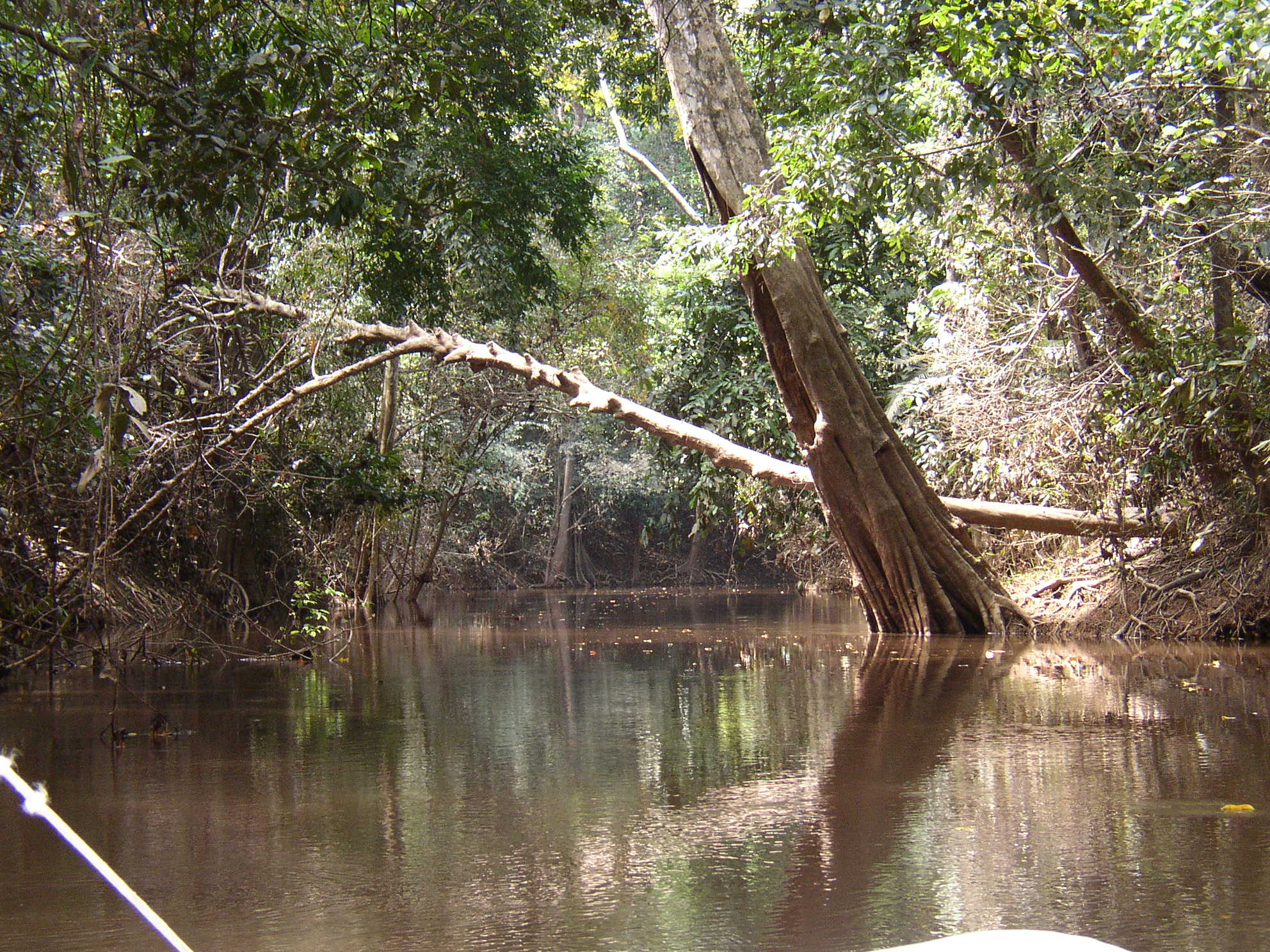
Chini River

== See also ==
- Geography of Malaysia
