= Malaysia Federal Route 424 =

Road in Malaysia

Federal Route 424
- Jalan Bukit Pelindung

Route information
- Length: 2.99 km (1.86 mi)

Major junctions
- West end: FT 227 Jalan Tengku Muhamad
- FT 227 Jalan Tengku Muhamad
- East end: Bukit Pelindung

Location
- Country: Malaysia

Highway system
- Highways in Malaysia; Expressways; Federal; State

Jalan Bukit Pelindung, Federal Route 424, is a federal road in Kuantan, Pahang, Malaysia.

The Kilometre Zero is located at Jalan Tengku Muhamad junctions.

At most sections, the Federal Route 424 was built under the JKR R5 road standard, with a speed limit of 90 km/h.

== List of junctions ==
Km	Exit	Junctions	To	Remarks
		FT 227 Jalan Tengku Muhamad	FT 227 Jalan Tengku Muhamad North; FT 227 Alor Akar; FT 3486 Semambu; FT 2 Kuantan Port; FT 3 AH18 Chukai (Kemaman); FT 3 AH18 Kuala Terengganu; FT 2 Beserah SOUTH; FT 227 Teluk Cempedak; FT 135 Kuantan town centre	T-junctions
		Kondominium Classic		
		Hutan Lipur Bukit Pelindung dan Teluk Cempedak (Forest Reserve) --- m above sea level		
		V --- m above sea level	V	
		Bukit Pelindung --- m above sea level	VHF Stations V	
