= Jalan Tanjung Gelang =

Road in Malaysia

Federal Route 435
- Jalan Tanjung Gelang

Route information
- Length: 2.80 km (1.74 mi)

Major junctions
- West end: Pengorak
- FT 2 Federal Route 2
- East end: TLDM Tanjung Gelang Naval Base

Location
- Country: Malaysia
- Primary destinations: Bukit Tanjung Gelang

Highway system
- Highways in Malaysia; Expressways; Federal; State

Jalan Tanjung Gelang, Federal Route 435, is a federal road in Kuantan, Pahang, Malaysia. It is a main route to the Royal Malaysian Navy (TLDM) Tanjung Gelang Naval Base.

The Kilometre Zero is located at the entrance to the Royal Malaysian Navy (TLDM) Tanjung Gelang Naval Base.

At most sections, the Federal Route 435 was built under the JKR R5 road standard, with a speed limit of 90 km/h.

== List of junctions ==
Km	Exit	Junctions	To	Remarks
		Pengorak	Southwest; FT 2 Kuantan; FT 2 Beserah Northeast; FT 2 Kuantan Port; FT 3 AH18 Chukai (Kemaman); East Coast Expressway AH141 East Coast Expressway; Kuala Lumpur; Kuala Terengganu	T-junctions
		Bukit Tanjung Gelang		
		Kuantan Port		
FT 435; 0				
TLDM Tanjung Gelang Naval Base; Restricted area
		TLDM Tanjung Gelang Naval Base		Restricted area
