= Malaysia Federal Route 2 =

Road in Malaysia

Federal Route 2

Route information
- Part of AH141 (Kampung Bandar Dalam–Karak)
- Maintained by Malaysian Public Works Department
- Length: 276.9 km (172.1 mi)
- Existed: 1915–present
- History: Completed in 1959

Major junctions
- West end: Port Klang, Selangor
- Road: FT 103 Northport Highway; FT 180 North–South Port Link; FT 5 Federal Route 5; FT 20 North Klang Straits Bypass; FT 15 Federal Route 15; FT 1 Federal Route 1; FT 68 Federal Route 68; FT 28 Kuala Lumpur Middle Ring Road 2; Genting Sempah–Genting Highlands Highway; FT 8 Gua Musang Highway; FT 9 Federal Route 9; FT 236 Jalan Lanchang; FT 10 Federal Route 10; FT 83 Federal Route 83; FT 232 Federal Route 232; FT 62 Federal Route 62; FT 64 Federal Route 64; FT 222 (Federal Route 222) / FT 12 (Tun Razak Highway) / AH142; FT 3 / AH18 Kuantan Bypass; FT 3 / AH18 Federal Route 3; FT 183 Tanjung Lumpur Highway; FT 135 Jalan Teluk Sisik; FT 238 Jalan Haji Ahmad; FT 3486 Jalan Semambu; FT 227 Jalan Tengku Muhamad; FT 423 Jalan Stesen Satelit Bumi Kuantan; FT 435 Jalan Tanjung Gelang; Expressways: Duta–Ulu Klang Expressway / AH141; Kuala Lumpur–Karak Expressway / AH141; East Coast Expressway / AH141
- East end: Kuantan Port, Pahang

Location
- Country: Malaysia
- Primary destinations: Klang, Shah Alam, Kuala Lumpur, Gombak, Karak, Lanchang, Mentakab, Temerloh, Maran, Gambang, Kuantan, Beserah

Highway system
- Highways in Malaysia; Expressways; Federal; State

The Federal Route 2 is a major east–west oriented federal highway in Malaysia. The 276.9 kilometres (172 mi) road connects Port Klang in Selangor to Kuantan Port in Pahang. The Federal Route 2 became the backbone of the road system linking the east and west coasts of Peninsular Malaysia before being surpassed by the East Coast Expressway E8.

== Route background ==
The Federal Route 2 is divided into two sections – Kuala Lumpur–Klang Highway (Malay: Jalan Kuala Lumpur–Klang) and Kuala Lumpur–Kuantan Road (Malay: Jalan Kuala Lumpur–Kuantan), where both sections are connected at Kuala Lumpur. The Kuala Lumpur–Klang Highway consists of Jalan Syed Putra, Federal Highway Route 2, Persiaran Sultan Ibrahim, Jalan Jambatan Kota (also concurrents with the Federal Route 5) and Persiaran Raja Muda Musa, where almost all sections of the Kuala Lumpur–Klang Highway are built as a divided highway except the short section from Port Klang Interchange to Port Klang jetty. The Kilometre Zero of the Federal Route 2 is located at Port Klang, Selangor.

At the town centre of Klang, the FT2 highway intersects with Jalan Langat FT5 at Simpang Lima Roundabout Interchange. As a result, the FT5 concurrents with the FT2 along Jambatan Kota before the FT5 route is diverted to Jalan Kapar FT5 at Simpang Tujuh Roundabout Interchange.

The FT2 highway becomes a controlled-access expressway starting from Berkeley Roundabout Interchange to Seputeh Interchange, where the controlled-access section is popularly known as the Federal Highway Route 2. The section of the Federal Highway FT2 from Berkeley Roundabout Interchange to Subang Airport Interchange was a tolled section managed by PLUS Malaysia Berhad, the operator of the nation's longest expressway, the North–South Expressway. The Federal Highway FT2 later becomes a limited-access arterial highway again after Seputeh Interchange, where it becomes Jalan Syed Putra. Jalan Syed Putra FT2 was concluded at Bulatan Kinabalu where it joins with Jalan Kinabalu FT1.

Meanwhile, the Kuala Lumpur–Kuantan Road begins as Jalan Pahang FT2 from Pahang Roundabout at Jalan Tun Razak. The FT2 road is later diverted to Jalan Gombak FT2/FT68 at Setapak Interchange. At Kampung Bandar Dalam Intersection, the FT2 route is once again diverted to Jalan Kampung Bandar Dalam FT2, while Jalan Gombak changes its route number to FT68. At Kampung Bandar Dalam Interchange, the FT2 concurrents with Duta–Ulu Klang Expressway E33/FT2 to Taman Greenwood, Batu Caves, then it concurrents with the Kuala Lumpur Middle Ring Road 2 (KL MRR2) FT28 from Taman Greenwood to Gombak North Interchange, before once again concurrents with the Kuala Lumpur–Karak Expressway E8/FT2 for its entire length.

At the end of the Karak Expressway at Karak Interchange, the Federal Route 2 is diverted as an ordinary 2-lane federal road while the Karak Expressway proceeds as the East Coast Expressway. The Federal Route 2 overlaps again at Kuantan with the Federal Route 3. The eastern terminus of the Federal Route 2 is at the Kuantan Port, where it meets the Federal Route 3.

Before the advent of the Swettenham Parkway (now Sultan Iskandar Highway) which is now a part of the Kuala Lumpur Middle Ring Road 1 (KL MRR1), the FT2 road overlapped with Jalan Kinabalu FT1 and Jalan Kuching FT1 from Kinabalu Roundabout Interchange to PWTC Interchange, where the FT2 was detoured to Jalan Tun Razak and Jalan Pahang. However, after the completion of the Kuala Lumpur–Petaling Jaya Traffic Dispersal Scheme in 1983 that extended the KL MRR1 to Jalan Istana Interchange that linked the MRR1 with Jalan Syed Putra FT2, the FT2 ceased to concurrent with the FT1 and was detoured to Lebuhraya Sultan Iskandar (formerly Lebuhraya Mahameru) instead.

== History ==
The Federal Route 2 begins as part of the earliest trunk road to Kuantan, Pahang from Benta, where the road was constructed as an extension of the Kuala Kubu Road from Kuala Kubu Bharu, Selangor to Kuala Lipis, Pahang. The 80-mile Kuala Kubu Road, which now becomes the entire section of the Federal Routes 55 and parts of Federal Route 218 and 8, was constructed by the Public Works Department (JKR) in 1887. The Benta–Kuantan Road, which now forms the entire section of the Federal Route 64 (Benta–Maran) and a part of the Federal Route 2 from Maran to Kuantan, was constructed in 1915. The Kuala Lumpur–Bentong section was constructed at the same time, followed by the Bentong–Temerloh section in 1928.

The Kuala Lumpur–Kuantan Road FT2 was concluded in 1955 when the final section from Temerloh to Maran was opened to traffic on 11 June 1955. The final section took a very long time to be completed due to rainy season, huge floods and swampy region, as well as the advances of the Imperial Japanese Army during the Second World War and the activities of the Malayan Communist Party terrorists during the Malayan Emergency. Construction began in 1925 and was completed in 1955.

In 1971, the old Temerloh Bridge spanning across the Pahang River was collapsed due to the huge flood in Temerloh. As a result, the Public Works Department (JKR) constructed a 575-m replacement bridge known as the Sultan Ahmad Shah Bridge FT2 beside the old bridge. The Sultan Ahmad Shah Bridge was much higher than the old bridge, forming the first grade-separated Interchange in Pahang that was linked to the Federal Route 10. The new bridge project also included a new roadway that bypassed Temerloh and Mentakab, causing the former Temerloh–Mentakab section to be re-gazetted as the Federal Route 87. The construction of the Sultan Ahmad Shah Bridge was completed in 1974.

Meanwhile, the Kuala Lumpur–Klang Highway FT2 was opened to traffic on 14 January 1959. The highway was intended as a replacement of the existing road system known as Jalan Klang Lama, Persiaran Selangor, Jalan Sungai Rasau and Jalan Batu Tiga Lama, allowing speeds of up to 60 mph. As a result, Jalan Klang Lama was downgraded into Selangor State Road B14. The Kuala Lumpur–Klang Highway FT2 was later being upgraded into a controlled-access highway by replacing the former at-grade intersection with grade-separated interchanges, making the highway as the nation's first controlled-access expressway. The upgraded controlled-access highway is now known as the Federal Highway Route 2.

In the 1970s, a replacement segment for the narrow and winding section from Kuala Lumpur to Karak (known as Jalan Gombak) was constructed. The replacement section was known as the Kuala Lumpur–Karak Highway FT2, featuring the 914.4-m Genting Sempah Tunnel. The 75.2-km toll highway was constructed at the cost of RM136.4 million and was opened to traffic on 7 January 1978. As a result, the old Jalan Gombak was re-gazetted as the Federal Route 68. In 1994, the Kuala Lumpur–Karak Highway FT2 was upgraded to a full controlled-access expressway by twinning the entire section, including the construction of the second tunnel beside the existing Genting Sempah Tunnel for eastbound traffic. The upgrade works began in 1994 by MTD Prime and was completed in 1998. However, only 60 km of the 75-km highway forms the present-day Kuala Lumpur–Karak Expressway E8/FT2; the remaining 15 km forms a part of the Kuala Lumpur Middle Ring Road 2 (KL MRR2) FT28 and Duta–Ulu Klang Expressway E33.

The construction of the extension of the Kuala Lumpur–Karak Expressway E8/FT2, known as the East Coast Expressway, was first announced in 1994 when the expressway itself was still under upgrading works. Initially, the East Coast Expressway was supposed to be constructed under a different route number by a consortium consisting MMC Corporation Berhad (through its subsidiary, Projek Lebuhraya Timur Sdn. Bhd. (Pelita)), MTD Group and Malaysian Resource Corporation Berhad (MRCB), but was ultimately constructed by MTD Group in 2001 after the former consortium withdrew from the job due to the effects of the 1997 Asian financial crisis. The East Coast Expressway was opened to motorists on 1 August 2004, taking the role of the Federal Route 2 as the main east–west route from Kuala Lumpur to Kuantan. The expressway retained the E8 route number similar to the upgraded Kuala Lumpur–Karak Expressway E8/FT2, which was also operated by MTD Group (now ANIH Berhad).

In 2025 Independence Month, the main roads around Kuantan City, including Jalan Tanah Putih closed by phase from 27 August 2025, to make way for state-level celebration of Independence Day.

On 16 December 2025, because of the flood, the Gambang junctions is closed.

== Features ==
At most section, the Federal Route 2 was built under the JKR R5 road standard, allowing maximum speed limit of up to 90 km/h (56 mph).

=== Overlaps ===
Highway shield	Name	Location	Section
FT 2/ FT 5	Jalan Jambatan Kota	Klang	Simpang Lima Roundabout–Simpang Empat Roundabout
FT 68	Malaysia Federal Route 68	Kuala Lumpur	Setapak - Kampung Bandar Dalam, Kuala Lumpur
Duta–Ulu Klang Expressway			Kampung Bandar Dalam - Gombak
FT 28	Kuala Lumpur Middle Ring Road 2		Gombak - Gombak North
Kuala Lumpur–Karak Expressway			Gombak North - Karak
FT 2/ FT 3	Gambang–Kuantan Highway	Kuantan	Kuantan Airport - Kuantan

=== Alternate routes ===
- Duta–Ulu Klang Expressway (Tun Razak Link)
- Mentakab–Temerloh Bypass
- Jalan Klang Lama
- Persiaran Raja Muda Musa Slip Roads A and B ( FT 2A FT 2B)

=== Sections with motorcycle lanes ===
- Federal Highway

== Junction and town lists (west–east) ==
Legend:

- I/C - Interchange, I/S - Intersection, RSA - Rest and service area, OBR - Overhead bridge restaurant, R/R - Restaurant and rest plaza, L/B - Layby, V/P - Vista point, TN - tunnel, T/P - Toll plaza, BR - Bridge
- C - Cloverleaf, S - Stack, T-A - Trumpet-A, T-B - Trumpet-B, DT - Directional-T/Y, SDT - Semi-Directional-T/Y, P-Y - Partial-Y, D - Diamond, P-C - Partial cloverleaf, D-D - Diverging diamond, D-R - Direct ramp

State	District	Km	Exit	Name	Destinations	Notes
Selangor	Klang			Port Klang–Simpang Lima Roundabout	see also Persiaran Raja Muda Musa	
Selangor	Klang			Klang; Simpang Lima Roundabout–Simpang Empat Roundabout	see also Jalan Jambatan Kota	
Selangor–Kuala Lumpur Border				Klang–Kuala Lumpur	see also Federal Highway	
Kuala Lumpur				Kuala Lumpur	see also Jalan Syed Putra; Kuala Lumpur Middle Ring Road 1 Jalan Tuanku Abdul Rahman; Genting Klang–Pahang Highway; FT 68 Jalan Gombak; Jalan Kampung Bandar Dalam	
Kuala Lumpur–Selangor Border				Kuala Lumpur–Gombak	see also Duta–Ulu Klang Expressway / AH141 (old route to Greenwood Interchange at Route FT 28)	
Selangor	Gombak			Gombak–Gombak North	see also FT 28 / AH141 Kuala Lumpur Middle Ring Road 2	
Selangor–Pahang Border				Gombak North–Karak	see also Kuala Lumpur–Karak Expressway / AH141	
Pahang	Bentong			Karak-ECE I/C	C138 Jalan FELDA Mempaga – FELDA Mempaga, Pusat Serenti Mempaga East Coast Expressway / AH141 – Kuala Terengganu, Kuantan, Lanchang	Interchange
Pahang	Bentong			Taman Karak Jaya		
Pahang	Bentong			Taman Karak Indah		
Pahang	Bentong			Karak		
Pahang	Bentong		230	Karak; Simpang Pelangai I/S	FT 9 Malaysia Federal Route 9 – Telemung, Kuala Klawang, Kuala Pilah, Tampin	T-junctions
Pahang	Bentong			Taman Seri Bentong		
Pahang	Bentong		231	Kampung Lengkong I/S	C111 Jalan Lengkong – Kampung Lengkong	T-junctions
Pahang	Temerloh		232	Mempateh I/S	C115 Jalan Teris – Kampung Teris, Kampung Balok, FELDA Lakum, Raub	T-junctions
Pahang	Temerloh			Lanchang	FT 236 Jalan Lanchang – Kampung Bolok, Cempaka, FELDA Lakum, Raub, Kuala Lipis, Kuala Gandah Elephant Conservation Centre East Coast Expressway / AH141 – Kuala Lumpur, Kuantan, Kuala Terengganu	T-junctions
Pahang	Temerloh		BR	Sungai Cermang bridge		
Pahang	Temerloh			Kampung Sementih		
Pahang	Temerloh			Kampung Rantau Panjang		
Pahang	Temerloh			Kampung Woh		
Pahang	Temerloh			Kampung Bongsu		
Pahang	Temerloh			Kampung Sungai Kepung		
Pahang	Temerloh			Desa Bakti		
Pahang	Temerloh			Taman Mentakab Indah		
Pahang	Temerloh			Kampung Batu Tiga		
Pahang	Temerloh		233	Mentakab (West) I/S	FT 87 Malaysia Federal Route 87 – Mentakab, Jerantut, Taman Negara East Coast Expressway / AH141 – Kuala Lumpur, Kuantan, Kuala Terengganu	T-junctions
Pahang	Temerloh			Mentakab–Temerloh	see also Mentakab–Temerloh Bypass	
Pahang	Temerloh		235	Temerloh I/C	FT 87 Malaysia Federal Route 87 – Mentakab, Jerantut, Taman Negara; FT 10 Malaysia Federal Route 10 – Town centre, Bera, Teriang, Bahau, Gemas, Segamat, Bera Lake East Coast Expressway / AH141 – Kuala Lumpur, Kuantan, Kuala Terengganu	Roundabout and Parcelo Interchange
Pahang	Temerloh		RSA	Temerloh RSA	Temerloh RSA –	West bound
Pahang	Temerloh		BR	Sungai Pahang Bridge; Sultan Ahmad Shah Bridge (Temerloh Bridge)		
Pahang	Temerloh			Jalan Kampung Seberang	C123 Jalan Kampung Seberang – Kampung Seberang, Batu Sawar, Rantau Makmur	T-junctions
Pahang	Temerloh			Kampung Tebal		
Pahang	Temerloh		R/R	Temerloh R/R	Temerloh R/R – Petronas; Maju Curry House Restaurant	East bound
Pahang	Temerloh			Taman Harapan		
Pahang	Temerloh		236	Hospital Sultan Haji Ahmad Shah; Jalan Paya Luas	C125 Jalan Paya Luas – Kampung Paya Luas, Kampung Paya Pulai, Hospital Sultan Haji Ahmad Shah, Temerloh	T-junctions
Pahang	Temerloh		237	Gunung Senyum I/S; Jalan Padang Tenggala	C123 Jalan Padang Tenggala – Kampung Padang Tenggala, Batu Sawar, Rantau Makmur, Gunung Senyum	T-junctions
Pahang	Temerloh			Kampung Jaya 3		
Pahang	Temerloh			Kampung Jaya 5		
Pahang	Temerloh			Paya Pulai		
Pahang	Temerloh			Kampung Paya Pulai Tengah		
Pahang	Temerloh			Kampung Batu Empat		
Pahang	Temerloh			Jalan Kampung Guai	Jalan Kampung Guai – Kampung Guai, Charuk Puting	T-junctions
Pahang	Temerloh			Kampung Paya Pulai		
Pahang	Maran			Kampung Awah		
Pahang	Maran		238	Kampung Awah I/S	FT 83 Jalan Bandar Pusat Jengka – Bandar Pusat Jengka East Coast Expressway / AH141 – Kuala Lumpur, Kuantan, Kuala Terengganu	T-junctions
Pahang	Maran			Taman Awah Indah		
Pahang	Maran			Awah		
Pahang	Maran		239	Jalan Pekan Sehari Kampung Awah I/S	FT 232 Jalan Pekan Sehari Kampung Awah – Pekan Sehari Kampung Awah	T-junctions
Pahang	Maran			Kampung Rantau Panjang		
Pahang	Maran			Kampung Bukit Lada		
Pahang	Maran		240	Jalan Chenor I/S	C23 Jalan Chenor – Chenor	T-junctions
Pahang	Maran			Kampung Jengka Batu Tiga Belas		
Pahang	Maran		BR	Sungai Jengka bridge		
Pahang	Maran			Kampung Paya Pasir		
Pahang	Maran			Sungai Leng		
Pahang	Maran		RSA	Bukit Genting RSA & Paya Pasir Forest Reserve	Bukit Genting RSA & Paya Pasir Recreation Area –	
Pahang	Maran		BR	Sungai Irok bridge		
Pahang	Maran			Kampung Telut		
Pahang	Maran		BR	Sungai Jempul bridge		
Pahang	Maran		241	Pekan Tajau I/S	FT 62 Jalan Bandar Pusat Jengka Timur – Bandar Pusat Jengka; Jalan Kuala Jempul – Kampung Kuala Jempul	T-junctions
Pahang	Maran		RSA	Seri Jengka RSA	Seri Jengka RSA –	
Pahang	Maran			Kampung Sentosa		
Pahang	Maran			FELDA Bukit Tajau	FELDA Bukit Tajau	T-junctions
Pahang	Maran			Sungai Kemak		
Pahang	Maran		242	Jalan Lubuk Paku I/S	C21 Jalan Lubuk Paku – Lubuk Paku	T-junctions
Pahang	Maran		243	Sungai Jerik I/S	FT 64 Malaysia Federal Route 64 – Jerantut, Bandar Pusat Jengka	T-junctions
Pahang	Maran			Maran	Maran town centre, Maran District and Land Office, Maran District Mosque	
Pahang	Maran			Maran	C133 Jalan Kampung Bak Bak – Kampung Bak Bak	
Pahang	Maran		244	Serangkam I/S	C133 Jalan Serangkam – Kampung Bak-Bak, Kampung Serangkam	T-junctions
Pahang	Maran		BR	Maran River bridge		
Pahang	Maran			Taman Maran Impian		
Pahang	Maran		245	Maran-ECE I/S	East Coast Expressway / AH141 – Kuala Lumpur, Temerloh, Chenor, Sri Jaya, Kuantan, Kuala Terengganu	T-junctions
Pahang	Maran			Kampung Bentung		
Pahang	Maran			Kampung Teras		
Pahang	Maran		BR	Sungai Luit bridge		
Pahang	Maran			Kampung Luit		
Pahang	Maran			Jalan Ulu Luit	C135 Jalan Ulu Luit – Kampung Ulu Luit	T-junctions
Pahang	Maran			Kampung Kertam		
Pahang	Maran			FELDA New Zealand	FT 1485 Jalan FELDA New Zealand – FELDA New Zealand	T-junctions
Pahang	Maran			Sri Jaya		
Pahang	Maran		246	Sri Jaya-ECE I/S	East Coast Expressway / AH141 – Kuala Lumpur, Temerloh, Maran, Gambang, Kuantan, Kuala Terengganu	T-junctions
Pahang	Maran		247	Jalan Belimbing I/S	C19 Jalan Belimbing – Belimbing, Tasik Chini	T-junctions
Pahang	Maran			Kampung Batu 37		
Pahang	Kuantan			Kampung Paya Bungor		
Pahang	Kuantan			Lake Paya Bungor	Lake Paya Bungor – V	
Pahang	Kuantan			Kampung Paya Merbau		
Pahang	Kuantan			Kampung Gelugur		
Pahang	Kuantan			Kampung Berkelah		
Pahang	Kuantan		BR	Sungai Lepar bridge		
Pahang	Kuantan			Hutan Lipur Berkelah		
Pahang	Kuantan		BR	Sungai Berkelah bridge		
Pahang	Kuantan			Kampung Batu Licin		
Pahang	Kuantan			Kampung Semugi		
Pahang	Kuantan			Kampung Pohol		
Pahang	Kuantan			Paya Besar		
Pahang	Kuantan			Sungai Belat		
Pahang	Kuantan			Gambang		
Pahang	Kuantan			Gambang–Kuantan	see also Gambang–Kuantan Highway	
Pahang	Kuantan		257	Padang Lalang I/S	FT 135 Jalan Teluk Sisik – Teluk Cempedak; FT 183 Tanjung Lumpur Highway – Tanjung Lumpur, Pekan, Johor Bahru, Pantai Sepat	Junctions
Pahang	Kuantan		2--	Jalan Haji Ahmad I/S	FT 238 Jalan Haji Ahmad – Galing, Semambu, Jabur	T-junctions
Pahang	Kuantan		BR	Sungai Galing bridge		
Pahang	Kuantan		2--	Jalan Air Putih I/S	Jalan Air Putih – Air Putih	T-junctions
Pahang	Kuantan			Taman Beserah		
Pahang	Kuantan			Sungai Alor Akar bridge		
Pahang	Kuantan		258	Alor Akar I/S	FT 3486 Jalan Semambu – Semambu, Jabur; FT 227 Jalan Tengku Muhamad – Teluk Cempedak	Junctions
Pahang	Kuantan			Kampung Ceti	Kampung Pelindung	T-junctions
Pahang	Kuantan			Kampung Alur Tuan Haji		
Pahang	Kuantan			Kampung Rumbia	Kampung Rumbia, Kampung Pasir Garam, Kampung Bugis	T-junctions
Pahang	Kuantan			Kampung Jeram Beserah		
Pahang	Kuantan			Jalan Stesen Satelit Bumi Kuantan	FT 423 Jalan Stesen Satelit Bumi Kuantan – Kuantan Satellite Earth Station, Taman Beserah, Taman Perumahan Bukit Beserah	T-junctions
Pahang	Kuantan		BR	Sungai Beserah bridge		
Pahang	Kuantan			Kampung Tuan		
Pahang	Kuantan			Beserah	Beserah Beach – V	T-junctions
Pahang	Kuantan			Kampung Batu Hitam	Batu Hitam Beach – V	T-junctions
Pahang	Kuantan			Kampung Sungai Karang	Sungai Karang Beach – V	T-junctions
Pahang	Kuantan			Pengkalan Damar	Jalan Pengkalan Damar – Pengkalan Damar	T-junctions
Pahang	Kuantan		BR	Sungai Karang bridge		
Pahang	Kuantan			Swiss Garden Resort		
Pahang	Kuantan			Duta Vista Resort		
Pahang	Kuantan			Kampung Balok Baru		
Pahang	Kuantan			Kampung Balok		
Pahang	Kuantan		BR	Sungai Balok bridge		
Pahang	Kuantan			Kampung Seberang Balok		
Pahang	Kuantan			Kampung Berahi		
Pahang	Kuantan		259	Kuantan Bypass I/S	FT 3 / AH18 Kuantan Bypass – Gebeng, Kemaman, Kuala Terengganu, Cherating	T-junctions
Pahang	Kuantan			Kampung Selamat		
Pahang	Kuantan		2--	Kuantan Port I/S	Kuantan Port Industrial Area, Kemaman, Kuala Terengganu	T-junctions
Pahang	Kuantan		260	Pengorak I/S	FT 435 Jalan Tanjung Gelang – Tanjung Gelang, TLDM Tanjung Gelang Naval Base	T-junctions
Pahang	Kuantan			Lembaga Pelabuhan Kuantan (LPKtn) flat quarters		
Pahang	Kuantan			Kuantan Port; Customs checkpoint	Kuantan Port – Customs	U-Turn
Pahang	Kuantan			Kuantan Port; Customs checkpoint	Kuantan Port – Customs Customs	
Pahang	Kuantan			Kuantan Port	Kuantan Port	

=== Gambang–Kuantan Highway ===
The entire route is located in Kuantan District, Pahang.

Location	km	mi	Exit	Name	Destinations	Notes
Gambang			Through to FT 2 Malaysia Federal Route 2			
Gambang				Gambang		
Gambang			251	Gambang I/S	FT 222 / AH142 Tun Khalil Yaakob Highway – Bandar MEC, Universiti Malaysia Pahang (UMP), Sekolah Sukan Malaysia Pahang (SSMP) East Coast Expressway / AH141 – Kuala Lumpur, Kuala Terengganu FT 12 / AH142 Tun Razak Highway – Pekan, Bandar Muadzam Shah, Segamat, Johor Bahru, Singapore	Junctions
Gambang			Gambang RSA, Caltex petrol station			
Kuantan				Kampung Batu Sebelas		
Kuantan			252	Jalan Panching I/S	FT 1486 Jalan Panching – Panching, Sungai Lembing, Sungai Lembing Museum	T-junctions
Kuantan				Jaya Gading	C179 Jalan Jaya Gading – Jaya Gading	From Kuantan only
Kuantan				TUDM Kuantan	TUDM Kuantan	From Gambang only
Kuantan			253	Pandan I/C	FT 3 / AH18 Kuantan Bypass – Sultan Haji Ahmad Shah Airport, Chukai (Kemaman), Kuala Terengganu, Bandar Indera Mahkota, Sungai Lembing, Kuantan Port, Cherating; International Islamic University Malaysia (UIAM Kampus Kuantan)	Trumpet interchange
Kuantan				SEMSAS	Sekolah Menengah Sains Sultan Haji Ahmad Shah (SEMSAS)	From Kuantan only
Kuantan				Taman Tas I/S	Taman Tas	T-junctions
Kuantan				Seri Damai	C181 Jalan Seri Damai – SK Fakeh Abd Samad, Kg Seri Damai, Jaya Gading	From Kuantan only
Kuantan			254	Jalan Pekan I/C	FT 3 / AH18 Jalan Pekan – Pekan, Kuala Rompin, Mersing, Johor Bahru	Half-diamond interchange
Kuantan				KUIPSAS	Kolej Universiti Islam Pahang Sultan Ahmad Shah (KUIPSAS)	
Kuantan				Taman Guru		From Kuantan only
Kuantan			255	Permatang Badak I/S	FT 229 Jalan Permatang Badak – Permatang Badak	T-junctions
Kuantan				Perumahan Sungai Isap Tiga		
Kuantan				Kampung Belukar Maju		
Kuantan				Perumahan Sungai Isap Satu		
Kuantan				Taman Tanah Puteh Baharu		
Kuantan				Kampung Baharu Batu Empat		
Kuantan				Medan Feri		
Kuantan			Sungai Kuantan Bridge			
Kuantan				Kampung Damak		
Kuantan			2--	Jalan Seri Teruntum Exit	Jalan Seri Teruntum – Bukit Setongkol, Bandar Indera Mahkota	From Gambang only
Kuantan			256	Jalan Wong Ah Jang I/S	Jalan Wong Ah Jang – Beserah, Kuala Terengganu	T-junctions
Kuantan				Kuantan Independent Square	Kuantan Independent Square (Dataran Kemerdekaan Kuantan)	
Kuantan				Tengku Ampuan Afzan Hospital	Tengku Ampuan Afzan Hospital –	Kuantan bound
Kuantan				Kuantan City Council (MBK) main headquarters		
Kuantan				Kuantan	FT 2 Jalan Mahkota – Beserah, Teluk Cempedak, Sultan Ahmad Shah Mosque	Start/End of dual-carriageway
1.000 mi = 1.609 km; 1.000 km = 0.621 mi: Concurrency terminus; Incomplete access

== See also ==
- Malaysia Federal Route 1 – the main north–south backbone road of Peninsular Malaysia
- Malaysia Federal Route 4 – the second east–west backbone road of northern Peninsular Malaysia
