= Malaysia Federal Route 238 =

Road in Malaysia

Federal Route 238
- Jalan Haji Ahmad

Route information
- Length: 3.77 km (2.34 mi)

Major junctions
- North end: Semambu
- FT 2 Jalan Beserah; Jalan Air Putih
- South end: Kuantan; Taman Galing junctions

Location
- Country: Malaysia
- Primary destinations: Galing

Highway system
- Highways in Malaysia; Expressways; Federal; State

Jalan Haji Ahmad, Federal Route 238, is a federal road in Kuantan, Pahang, Malaysia. The Kilometre Zero of the Federal Route 238 is at Taman Galing junctions.

== Features ==
At most sections, the Federal Route 238 was built under the JKR R5 road standard, with a speed limit of 90 km/h.

== List of junctions ==
Km	Exit	Junctions	To	Remarks
FT 238; 0		Kuantan; Taman Galing Junctions	FT 2 Jalan Beserah Southwest; FT 2 Kuantan town centre FT 2 Gambang; FT 2 Kuala Lumpur; FT 3 AH18 Pekan; FT 3 AH18 Johor Bahru Northeast; FT 2 Kuantan Port; FT 3 AH18 Chukai (Kemaman); FT 3 AH18 Kuala Terengganu; FT 2 Beserah	3-way intersections
		Taman Galing		
		Taman Union		
		Taman Pacific		
		Taman Hung Seng		
		Taman Asia		
		Taman Mirama		
		Taman Desa Anggerik		
		Taman Setali Indah		
		Galing		
		Perkampungan Seri Setali		
		Taman Setali		
		Taman Galing		
		Sungai Galing bridge		
		Semambu; Semambu Industrial Area Junctions	North; Jalan Industri Semambu 5 Semambu Industrial Area East; Jalan Air Putih; Air Putih	3-way intersections
