= Berkelah Falls =

Waterfalls in Pahang, Malaysia

Coordinates: 3°45′13″N 102°58′47″E

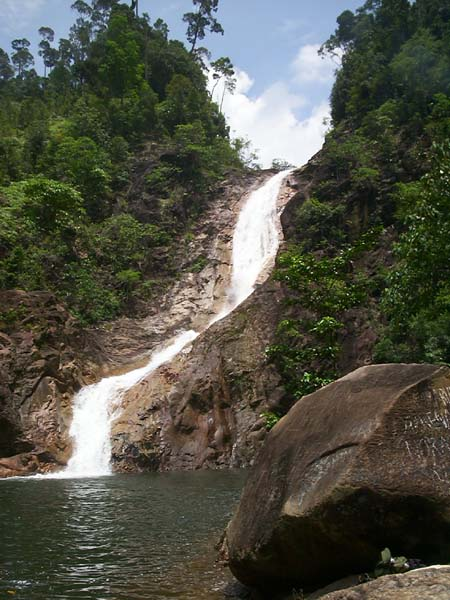
Berkelah Falls

Berkelah Falls is a cascade of waterfalls located in Pahang, Malaysia. It is about 31 to 35 km away from Kuantan City in the direction of Maran. The falls consist of seven tiers, according to official data from the Forestry Department Peninsular Malaysia (Jabatan Perhutanan Semenanjung Malaysia), but there are actually more tiers above the seventh. The seventh and highest fall reaches an estimated height of 50 metres (3°45'13.31"N, 102°58'47.5"E).

To get there from Kuala Lumpur, one needs to drive along the Karak Highway, then continue on to the East Coast Expressway. Drive 110 km toward Exit 827, Sri Jaya, then turn into the Federal Route 2. Drive in the direction of Kuantan. At kilometre 46, there is a signboard which says "Hutan Lipur Berkelah". Turn left, drive for approximately 5 km, then you will reach a car park designated for campers.

The river and falls were named "Berkelah", because once upon a time ago, there were ikan kelah, or mahseer in the river. The species has suffered a severe population decline, and are now considered threatened, due to habitat loss.

== See also ==
- List of waterfalls
