= Beserah =

Beserah Beseroh
- State Legislative Assembly
- Location in Malaysia
- Coordinates: 3°54′59″N 103°21′54″E
- Country: Malaysia
- State: Pahang
- District: Kuantan

Area
  - Land: 120 sq mi (300 km^{2})
- Highest elevation (Bukit Tokki): 1,180 ft (360 m)
- Time zone: UTC+8 (Malaysian Standard Time)
- Postcode: 26xxx

Beserah (Terengganu Malay: Beseroh) is a town located in Kuantan District, Pahang, Malaysia and its position between the cities of Kuantan and Chukai, located in the neighbouring state of [[Terengganu]].

With an estimated total land area 300 square kilometers about almost same size with Federal Territories of Malaysia and two times larger than Liechtenstein. There are two mukim within this state assembly; mukim Beserah (same name with the DUN) and mukim Sungai Karang.

Initially, Beserah consisted of several traditional villages, including:

- Pantai village
- Pelindung village
- Rumbia village
- Chetty village
- Bugis village
- Darat Sekolah village
- Jeram village
- Alor Tuan Haji village
- Jambu village
- Kubur village
- Tuan village
- Masjid village
- Pasir Garam village
- Baru village
- Alor Ladang village
- Bahagia village
- Padang To'Cha village
- Bukit Batu Hitam village
- Batu Hitam village
- Darat village
- Sungai Karang Pantai village
- Sungai Karang Darat village
- Tanjung village
- Alor Batu village
- Cengal Lempung village
- Balok Baru village
- Balok village
- Seberang Balok village
- Berahi village
- Selamat village
- Gebeng village
- Sungai Ular village
- Baging village
- Padang Lalang village
- Kubang Ikan village
- Pak Siah village

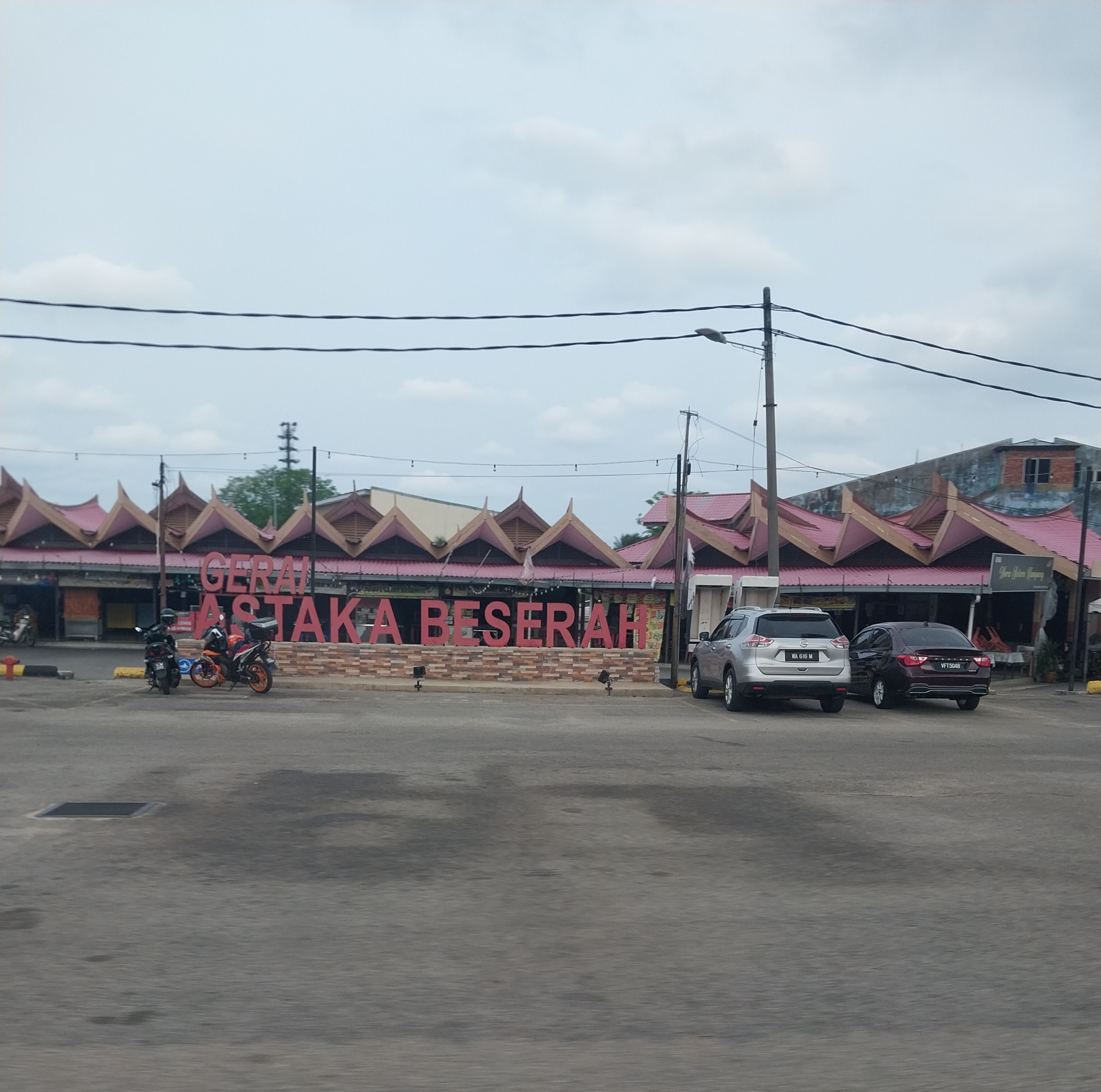
Astaka Beserah.

Being located in the northeasternmost narrow coastal strip of Pahang which is bordered by the state of Terengganu to the north and west; majority local people in this area are speaking the Terengganu Malay dialect which is make Beserah quite distinctive from other areas of Pahang that used origin dialects of Pahang Malay.

The increase in population has created a structured settlements and among the earliest is Rumah Murah, Taman Beserah and Taman Balok Makmur. Beserah have many fishing villages and is known as a manufacturer and supplier of various products from the sea. Local residents work as fishermen and are also involved in salted fish, anchovies, keropok lekor and other work based on resources from the sea. The famous traditional cuisine in this area is Mee Calong.

Malaysia first's base earth station is located in this area. This station was built near Taman Beserah and was launched by Prime Minister Tunku Abdul Rahman on 6th April 1970.

There was an islet lies off the coast of Beserah that became attraction of tourists who like to picnic and snorkeling known as Pula Ulor in local dialect that can be reached by 10 minutes traveling by a boat from Jeti Al Muneer Sg Ular.

Pahang most important economic sites such as Industrial Park of Gebeng and Kuantan Port also located in Beserah.

The highest point in Beserah is Bukit Tokki (360 meters above sea level). This hill trailhead can be accessed by hikers through Jalan Kampung Darat Sekolah 33.

The people who live on the land side depend on rubber and durian. Paddy was once cultivated in Beserah. Batik cloth companies and small handicraft companies from sea shells and coconut can be found here.

== Sources ==
- "Official Portal of Tourism Pahang - Map of Pahang".
- "Official Portal of Tourism Pahang - Beserah".
- "The Hidden Islet of Kuantan - Pulau Ular".
- "Malaysia First Base Earth Station".
- "Memoir of First Malaysia Base Earth Station".
