= Malaysia Federal Route 227 =

Road in Malaysia

Federal Route 227
- Jalan Tengku Muhammad

Route information
- Length: 3.24 km (2.01 mi)

Major junctions
- North end: Alor Akar
- FT 2 Jalan Beserah; FT 424 Jalan Bukit Pelindung; FT 135 Jalan Teluk Cempedak
- South end: Teluk Cempedak

Location
- Country: Malaysia
- Primary destinations: Bukit Pelindung

Highway system
- Highways in Malaysia; Expressways; Federal; State

Jalan Tengku Muhamad, Federal Route 227, is a federal road in Kuantan, Pahang, Malaysia. The road connects Alor Akar in the north to Teluk Cempedak in the south. It was named after the former second and fourth Menteri Besar (Chief Minister) of Pahang, Tengku Muhammad ibni Almarhum Sultan Ahmad Al-Mu’adzam Shah. The Kilometre Zero of the Federal Route 227 starts at Alor Akar junctions.

At most sections, the Federal Route 227 was built under the JKR R5 road standard, with a speed limit of 90 km/h.

== List of junctions ==
Km	Exit	Junctions	To	Remarks
FT 227; 0		Alor Akar; Alor Akar Junctions	Northwest; FT 3486 Jalan Semambu; Air Putih; Semambu FT 2 Jalan Beserah Southwest; FT 2 Kuantan town centre FT 2 Gambang; FT 2 Kuala Lumpur; FT 3 AH18 Pekan; FT 3 AH18 Johor Bahru Northeast; FT 2 Kuantan Port; FT 3 AH18 Chukai (Kemaman); FT 3 AH18 Kuala Terengganu; FT 2 Beserah	Junctions
		Taman Pelindung Aman		
		Kampung Alor Akar		
		Bukit Pelindung Junctions	East; FT 424 Jalan Bukit Pelindung; Bukit Pelindung	T-junctions
		Jalan Dato' Bahaman Junctions	West; Jalan Dato' Bahaman; Kubang Buaya	T-junctions
		Pelindung Heights	Pelindung Heights; Pejabat Kesihatan Daerah Kuantan (Kuantan District Health Office)	
		Sekolah Tok Sira	Sekolah Kebangsaan Tok Sira; Sekolah Menengah Kebangsaan Tok Sira	
		Teluk Cempedak; Teluk Cempedak Junctions	FT 135 Jalan Teluk Cempedak West; FT 2 Kuantan town centre FT 2 Gambang; FT 2 Kuala Lumpur; FT 3 AH18 Pekan; FT 3 AH18 Johor Bahru East; FT 135 Teluk Cempedak; V Hyatt Regency Kuantan; Botanical Gardens; Balai Karyaneka South; Jalan Padang Golf; Bukit Tembeling; V Mini Zoo Kuantan; Taman Teruntum; Mini Zoo; Royal Pahang Golf Club; Kuantan Tembeling Resort	Junctions
