= Mee calong =

Noodle dish

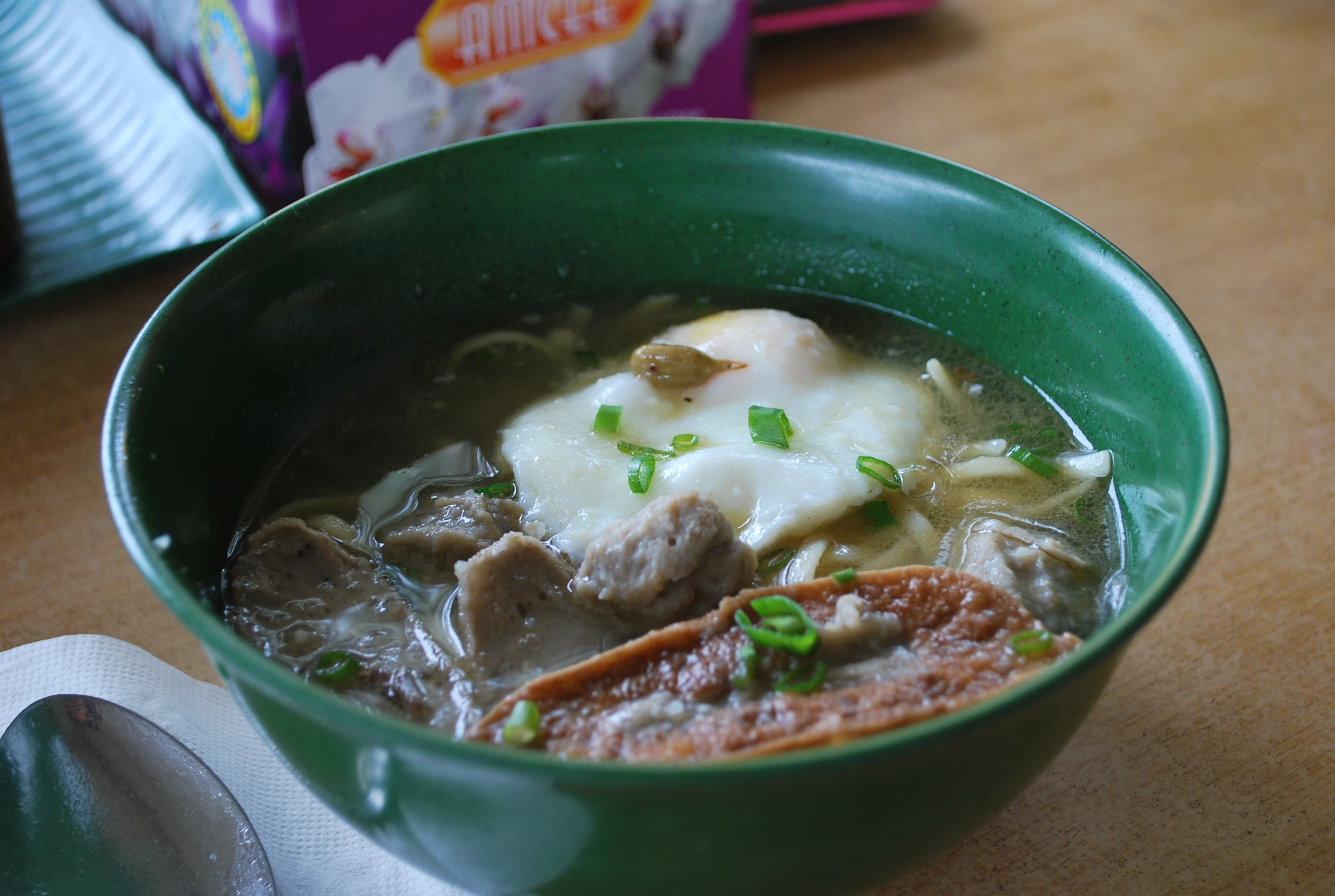
Mee calong in Beserah

Mee calong (Jawi: مي چالوڠ), also spelled mi calong, is a noodle dish eaten with fish soup, fish balls, and tofu puffs. This original Beserah traditional dish was introduced to the local people of Beserah years ago by a Malay trader from Terengganu known as Cik Kadir.

== Etymology ==
Calong is a Malay word that means 'fish meat shaped into balls'.
