= Jalan Chenor =

Road in Malaysia

Pahang Route 23
- Jalan Chenor

Major junctions
- North end: FT 2 Jalan Temerloh-Maran
- FT 2 Federal Route 2
- South end: Chenor

Location
- Country: Malaysia
- Primary destinations: Kampung Sekara

Highway system
- Highways in Malaysia; Expressways; Federal; State

Jalan Chenor (Pahang state route C23) is a major road in Pahang, Malaysia.

== List of junctions ==
Km	Exit	Junctions	To	Remarks
		Jalan Temerloh-Maran	West; FT 2 Temerloh; FT 83 Bandar Pusat Jengka; East Coast Expressway AH141 East Coast Expressway; Kuala Lumpur East; FT 2 Kuantan; FT 2 Maran; East Coast Expressway AH141 East Coast Expressway; Kuala Terengganu	T-junctions
		Kampung Paya Kerbau		
		Kampung Baru Banjir Dua		
		Kampung Raja		
		Kampung Baharu		
		Chenor	East; C130 Jalan Mengkarak-Paluh Hinai; Kampung Paya Ladang; Mengkarak; Paluh Hinai	Roundabout
		Kampung Huma Luas	Northwest; FT 232 Jalan Pekan Sehari Kampung Awah; Pekan Sehari Kampung Awah	T-junctions
		Sekara		
