= Kuantan Satellite Earth Station Road =

Road in Malaysia

Federal Route --
- Jalan Stesen Satelit Bumi Kuantan

Route information
- Maintained by Malaysian Public Works Department
- Length: 1.26 km (0.78 mi)

Major junctions
- East end: FT 2 Jalan Beserah
- FT 2 Federal Route 2
- West end: Taman Perumahan Bukit Beserah

Location
- Country: Malaysia
- Primary destinations: Taman Beserah, Kuantan Satellite Earth Station

Highway system
- Highways in Malaysia; Expressways; Federal; State

Jalan Stesen Satelit Bumi Kuantan, formerly Federal Route 423, is a institutional federal road in Kuantan, Pahang, Malaysia.

At most sections, the Federal Route 423 was built under the JKR R5 road standard, with a speed limit of 90 km/h (56 mph).

== Junction lists ==
The entire route is located in Kuantan District, Pahang.

Legend:

- I/C - Interchange, I/S - Intersection, RSA - Rest and service area, OBR - Overhead bridge restaurant, R/R - Restaurant and rest plaza, L/B - Layby, V/P - Vista point, TN - tunnel, T/P - Toll plaza, BR - Bridge
- C - Cloverleaf, S - Stack, T-A - Trumpet-A, T-B - Trumpet-B, DT - Directional-T/Y, SDT - Semi-Directional-T/Y, P-Y - Partial-Y, D - Diamond, P-C - Partial cloverleaf, D-D - Diverging diamond, D-R - Direct ramp

Location	km	mi	Destinations	Notes
Jalan Beserah			FT 2 Malaysia Federal Route 2 – Kuantan Port, Kuala Terengganu, Chukai, Kuantan, Kuala Lumpur	T-junctions
Taman Beserah				
Kuantan Satellite Earth Station			Kuantan Satellite Earth Station	Restricted area
Taman Kubang Jeram				
Taman Perumahan Bukit Beserah				
1.000 mi = 1.609 km; 1.000 km = 0.621 mi: Incomplete access
