= Pahang State Route C123 =

Road in Malaysia

Pahang Route 123
- Jalan Temerloh - Rumpun Makmur (Jalan C123)

Major junctions
- North end: Rumpun Makmur
- FT 2 Federal Route 2 FT 1535 Jalan Batu Sawar-Jengka Barat
- South end: Kampung Seberang Temerloh Federal Road 2

Location
- Country: Malaysia
- Primary destinations: Batu Sawar

Highway system
- Highways in Malaysia; Expressways; Federal; State

Jalan Kampung Seberang (Pahang state route C123) is a major road in Pahang, Malaysia.

== List of junctions ==
Km	Exit	Junctions	To	Remarks
		Jalan Temerloh-Maran	West; FT 2 Temerloh; FT 87 Mentakab; FT 10 Gemas; Temerloh rest and service area East Coast Expressway AH141 East Coast Expressway; Kuala Lumpur East; FT 2 Kuantan; FT 2 Maran; Temerloh Restaurant and Rest Plaza; East Coast Expressway AH141 East Coast Expressway; Kuala Terengganu	T-junctions
		Kampung Seberang		
		Old Temerloh bridge		
		Kampung Seberang Temerloh		
		Kampung Bangau Parit		
		Jalan Padang Tenggala	East; Jalan Padang Tenggala; Kampung Padang Tenggala; FT 2 Kuantan; FT 2 Maran	T-junctions
		Kampung Bangau Parit		
		Kampung Teluk Mengkuang		
		Kampung Teluk Ira		
		Kampung Durian Burung		
		Kampung Berhala Gantang		
		Kampung Bintang		
		Kampung Bintang Baharu		
		Kampung Bintang Hulu		
		ECE (West)	East Coast Expressway AH141 East Coast Expressway West; Kuala Lumpur; Karak; Temerloh; Kampung Tebing Tinggi	Special entry/exit lane for motorcycles Motorcycles only
		ECE (East)	East Coast Expressway AH141 East Coast Expressway East; Kuala Terengganu; Kuantan; Chenor; Temerloh Rest and Service Area	Special entry/exit lane for motorcycles Motorcycles only
		Kampung Sanggang Seberang		
		Kampung Badok		
		Kampung Batu Pasak		
		Kampung Batu Nangka		
		Kampung Teluk Sentang		
		Kampung Purun		
		Kampung Desa Baru Purun	Kampung Machang Manis	T-junctions
		Kampung Kelibut		
		Kampung Paya Salak		
		Kampung Nuar		
		Kampung Kerai		
		Kampung Pulau Pasir Mandi		
		Kampung Baning		
		Kampung Dingkir		
		Kampung Tampin		
		Kampung Tanjung		
		Kampung Batu Menunggul		
		Kampung Teluk Batu Sawar		
		Kampung Batu Sawar - Simpang Ke Felda Jengka		T-junctions
		Kampung Kuala Senyum		
		Kampung Badak		
		Kampung Jonggok		
		Kampung Teluk Sabak - Simpang ke Gunung Senyum		T-junctions
		Kampung Gonnye		
		Kampung Gempu		
		Kampung Angut aka Kampung Gunung Sunyum		
		Simpang Pulau Raya		
		Rumpun Makmur		
		Batu Sawar	East; FT 1535 Jalan Batu Sawar-Jengka Barat; Bandar Pusat Jengka	T-junctions
		Rumpun Makmur	Gunung Senyum recreational park V	
