= Malaysia Federal Route 232 =

Road in Malaysia

Federal Route 232
- Jalan Pekan Sehari - Kampung Awah

Route information
- Maintained by Malaysian Public Works Department
- Length: 6.55 km (4.07 mi)

Major junctions
- North end: Kampung Awah
- FT 2 Jalan Temerloh-Maran; C23 Jalan Chenor
- South end: C23 Jalan Chenor

Location
- Country: Malaysia
- Primary destinations: Pekan Sehari

Highway system
- Highways in Malaysia; Expressways; Federal; State

Federal Route 232, or Jalan Pekan Sehari - Kampung Awah, is the federal road in Pahang, Malaysia. The Kilometre Zero of Federal Route 232 starts at Jalan Temerloh-Maran junctions, at its interchange with the Federal Route 2, the main trunk road of central Peninsular Malaysia.

== Features ==
At most sections, the Federal Route 232 was built under the JKR R5 road standard, allowing maximum speed limit of up to 90 km/h.

== List of junctions and towns ==
km	Exit	Junctions	To	Remarks
FT 232; 0		Kampung Awah	West; FT 2 Temerloh; FT 2 Mentakab; FT 2 Kuala Lumpur East; FT 2 Maran; FT 2 Kuantan	T-junctions
		Pekan Sehari		
		Kampung Gumai		
		Kampung Huma Luas	C23 Jalan Chenor SOUTH; Kening Easau; Batu Bor Northeast; Chenor; Sekara	T-junctions
