= Malaysia Federal Route 135 =

Road in Malaysia

Federal Route 135
- Jalan Teluk Sisik; Jalan Dato' Mahmud; Jalan Teluk Cempedak

Route information
- Length: 5.27 km (3.27 mi)

Major junctions
- West end: Kuantan on Padang Lalang junctions
- FT 2 Jalan Teluk Sisik; FT 2 Jalan Beserah; FT 183 Tanjung Lumpur Highway; FT 227 Jalan Tengku Muhamad
- East end: Teluk Cempedak

Location
- Country: Malaysia
- Primary destinations: Teluk Sisik; Bukit Teruntum; Bukit Pelindung

Highway system
- Highways in Malaysia; Expressways; Federal; State

Federal Route 135, comprising Jalan Teluk Sisik, Jalan Dato' Mahmud and Jalan Teluk Cempedak, is a federal road in Kuantan, Pahang, Malaysia. It is also a main route to Teluk Cempedak beach. The Kilometre Zero of the Federal Route 135 starts at Padang Lalang junctions.

== Features ==
At most sections, the Federal Route 135 was built under the JKR R5 road standard, allowing maximum speed limit of up to 90 km/h.

== List of junctions ==
Km	Exit	Junctions	To	Remarks
FT 135; 0		Kuantan; Padang Lalang Junctions	West; FT 2 Jalan Teluk Sisik; FT 2 Town Centre; East Coast Expressway FT 2 AH141 Kuala Lumpur; Keropok Lekor stalls Sultan Ahmad Shah Mosque; Kuantan Esplanade North; FT 2 Jalan Beserah; FT 2 Beserah; FT 2 Kuantan Port; FT 3 AH18 Kuala Terengganu South; FT 183 Tanjung Lumpur Highway; FT 183 Tanjung Lumpur; FT 3 AH18 Pekan; FT 3 AH18 Johor Bahru; FT 230 Pantai Sepat	Junctions
FT 135 Jalan Teluk Sisik
		Jalan Tanjung Api	South; Jalan Tanjung Api; Padang Lalang Industrial Area; Tanjung Api	T-junctions
		Hotel Seri Malaysia		
		Vistana Hotel Kuantan		
		Sungai Galing bridge		
		Taman Seri Kuantan	North; Lorong Seri Kuantan 21; Taman Seri Kuantan	T-junctions
		Jalan Alor Akar	North; Jalan Alor Akar; Alor Akar; Taman Peng On; Taman Mutiara; Beserah	T-junctions
FT 135 Jalan Teluk Sisik
FT 135 Jalan Dato' Mahmud
		Taman Galing Park		
		Salik Atelier		
		Tanjung Api	North; Jalan Kubang Buaya; Kubang Buaya; Alor Akar; Taman Melodies; Beserah South; Jalan Selamat; Taman Selamat; Tanjung Api	T-junctions
		Sungai Alor Akar bridge		
		Jalan Dato Abdullah	South; Jalan Dato Abdullah; Taman Gelora; Cultural Centre	T-junctions
		Jalan Tok Sira	North; Jalan Tok Sira; Taman Jaya; Taman Ehsan Jaya	T-junctions
FT 135 Jalan Dato' Mahmud
FT 135 Jalan Teluk Cempedak
		Teluk Sisik Beach	West; Jalan Dato Abu Samah; Teluk Sisik Beach; V	T-junctions
		Pahang's Deputy Menteri Besar Residence		
		Pahang's Menteri Besar Residence		
		Istana Hinggap Diraja Kuantan		
		Bukit Tembeling	South; Jalan Padang Golf; Bukit Tembeling; V Mini Zoo Kuantan; Taman Teruntum; Mini Zoo; Royal Pahang Golf Club; Kuantan Tembeling Resort	T-junctions
		Jalan Tengku Muhamad	North; FT 227 Jalan Tengku Muhamad; Bukit Pelindung; Beserah	T-junctions
FT 135 Jalan Teluk Cempedak
Teluk Cempedak
		Balai Karyaneka		
		McDonald's Drive Thru	McDonald's	
		Teluk Cempedak	Teluk Cempedak; V Hyatt Regency Kuantan; Botanical Gardens	Roundabout
