= Galing =

- District
- Interactive map of Galing
- Location within West Kalimantan Location within Kalimantan Location within Indonesia
- Coordinates: 1°32′31.90528″N 109°21′53.79631″E
- Country: Indonesia
- Province: West Kalimantan
- Regency: Sambas
- District seat: Galing

Area
  - Total: 420.99 km^{2} (162.55 sq mi)

Population (2024)
  - Total: 25,808
  - Density: 61.303/km^{2} (158.77/sq mi)

Galing is a district in Sambas Regency, West Kalimantan, Indonesia. In 2024, it was inhabited by 25,808 people, and had a total area of 420.99 km^{2}.

== History ==
Galing was established on 15 May 2001, after being split off from the eastern part of Teluk Keramat district.

== Geography ==
Galing District consists of ten villages (desa):

- Sagu
- Sungai Palah
- Galing
- Tempapan Kuala
- Tempapan Hulu
- Ratu Sepudak
- Tri Kembang
- Tri Gadu
- Teluk Pandan
- Sijang
