= Sri Jaya =

Malaysian new village

Coordinates: 3.6620359°N 102.8818089°E

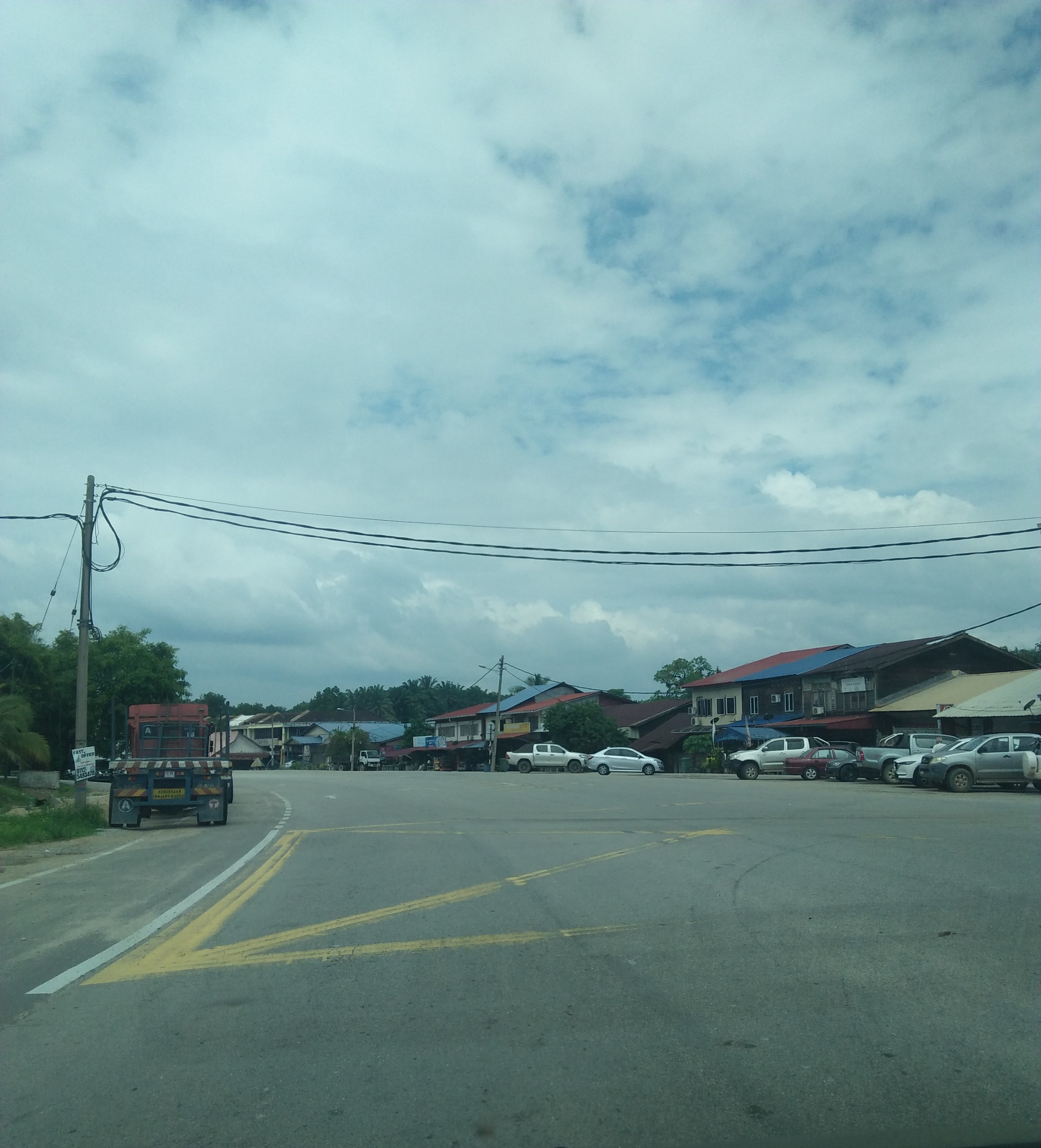
Sri Jaya main road.

Sri Jaya (Jawi: سري جاي, Chinese: 斯里再也) or Kampung Baru Sri Jaya is a new village in Maran District, Pahang, Malaysia, about 63 km from Kuantan. It is accessible through the East Coast Expressway at Exit 827. Sri Jaya is the entrance point to Tasik Chini and Berkelah falls.

== Transportation ==
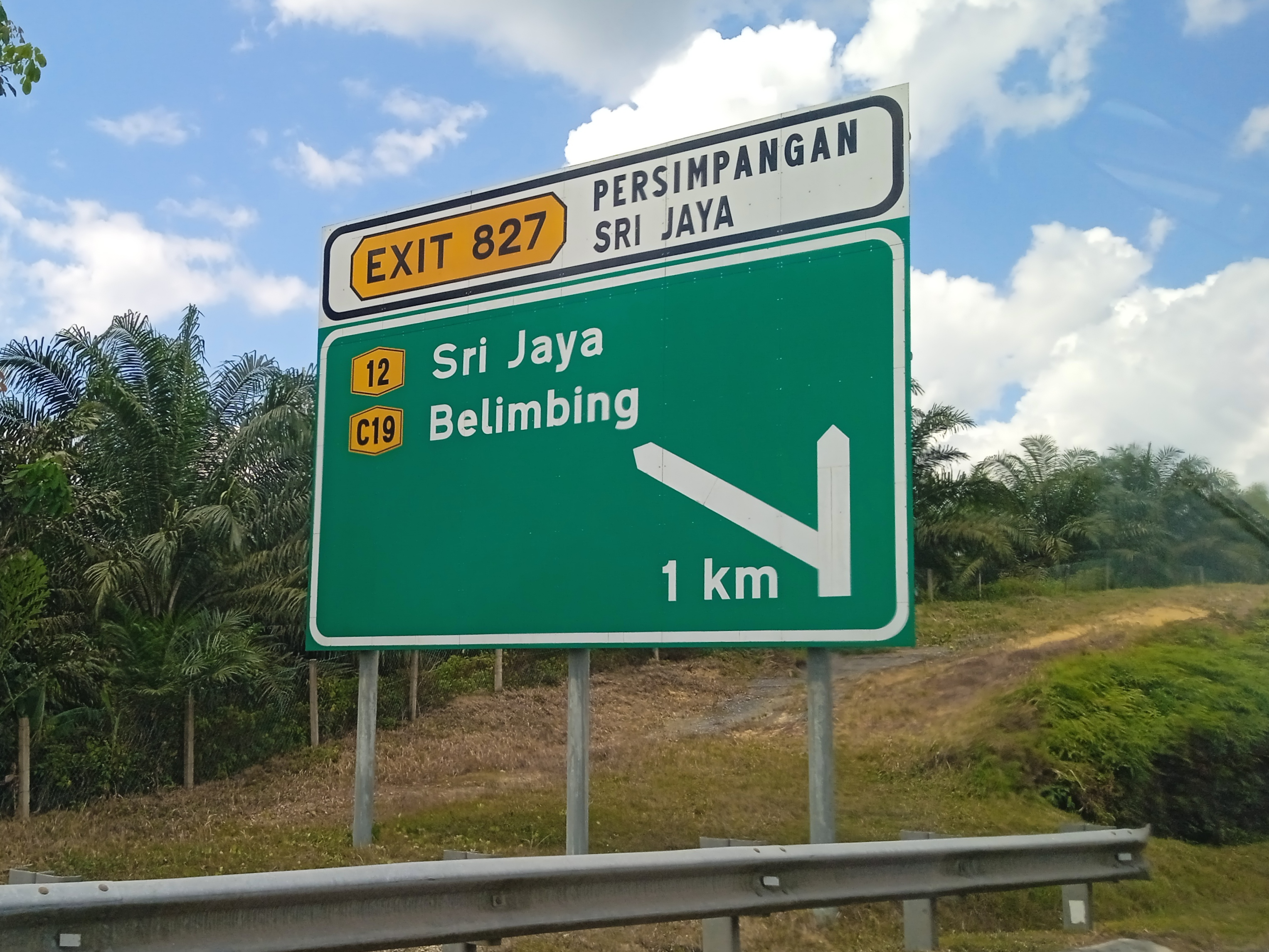
Sri Jaya Interchange road sign along East Coast Expressway

East Coast Expressway (Lebuhraya Pantai Timur), exit 827 (Sri Jaya Interchange) serves Sri Jaya.
