= Kuantan Port =

Port in Kuantan, Pahang, Malaysia

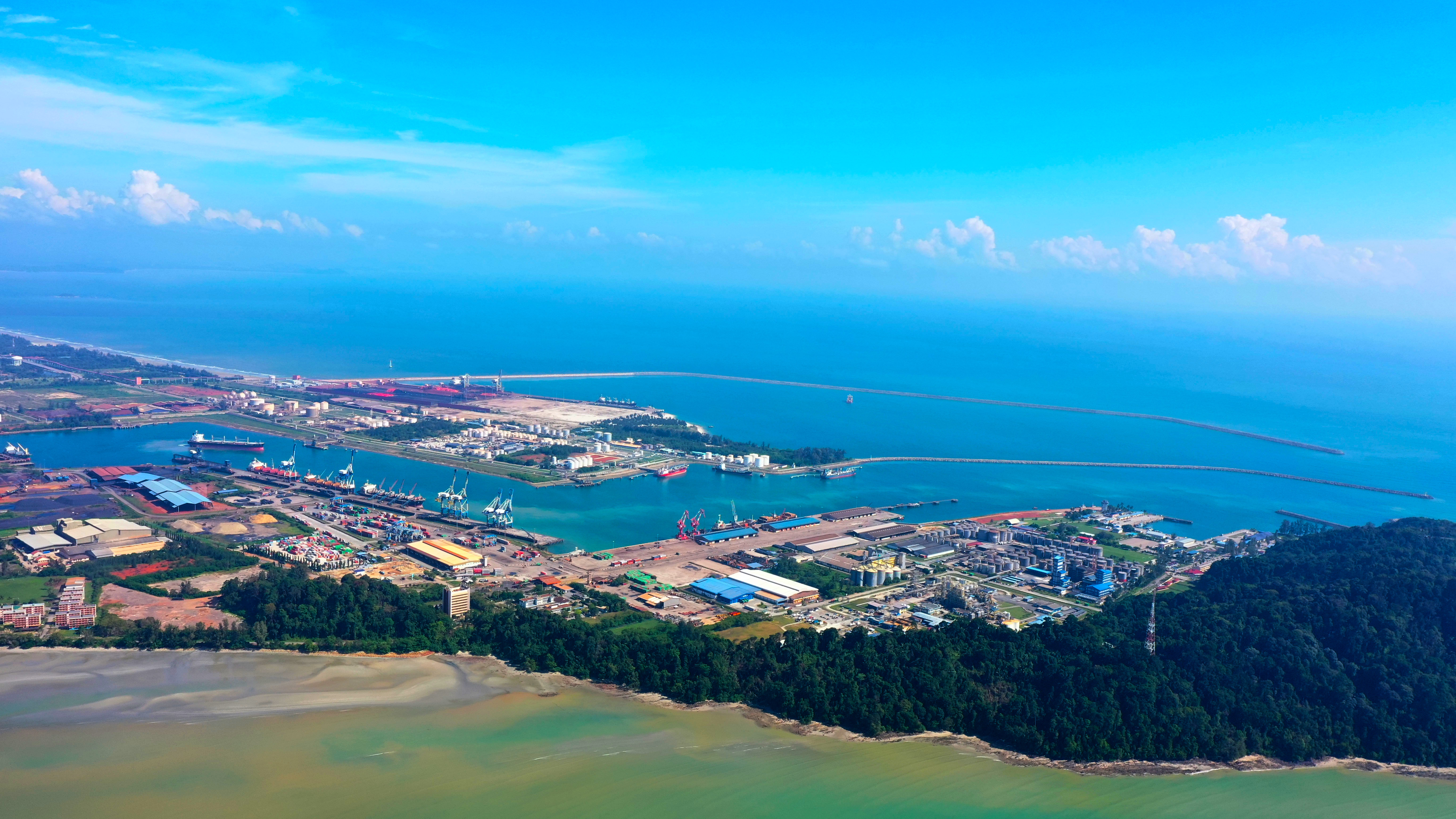
- Interactive map of Kuantan Port
- Native name: Pelabuhan Kuantan (Malay)

Location
- Location: Gebeng, Kuantan District, Pahang, Malaysia
- Coordinates: 3.9757°N 103.4277°E

Details
- Built: 1979
- Opened: 1980 (partial); 1984 (full)
- Operated by: Kuantan Port Consortium Sdn Bhd.
- Owned by: IJM Corporation Berhad (60%); Beibu Guld Holding (Hong Kong) Co. Ltd. (40%)
- No. of berths: 19

Statistics
- Website kuantanport.com.my

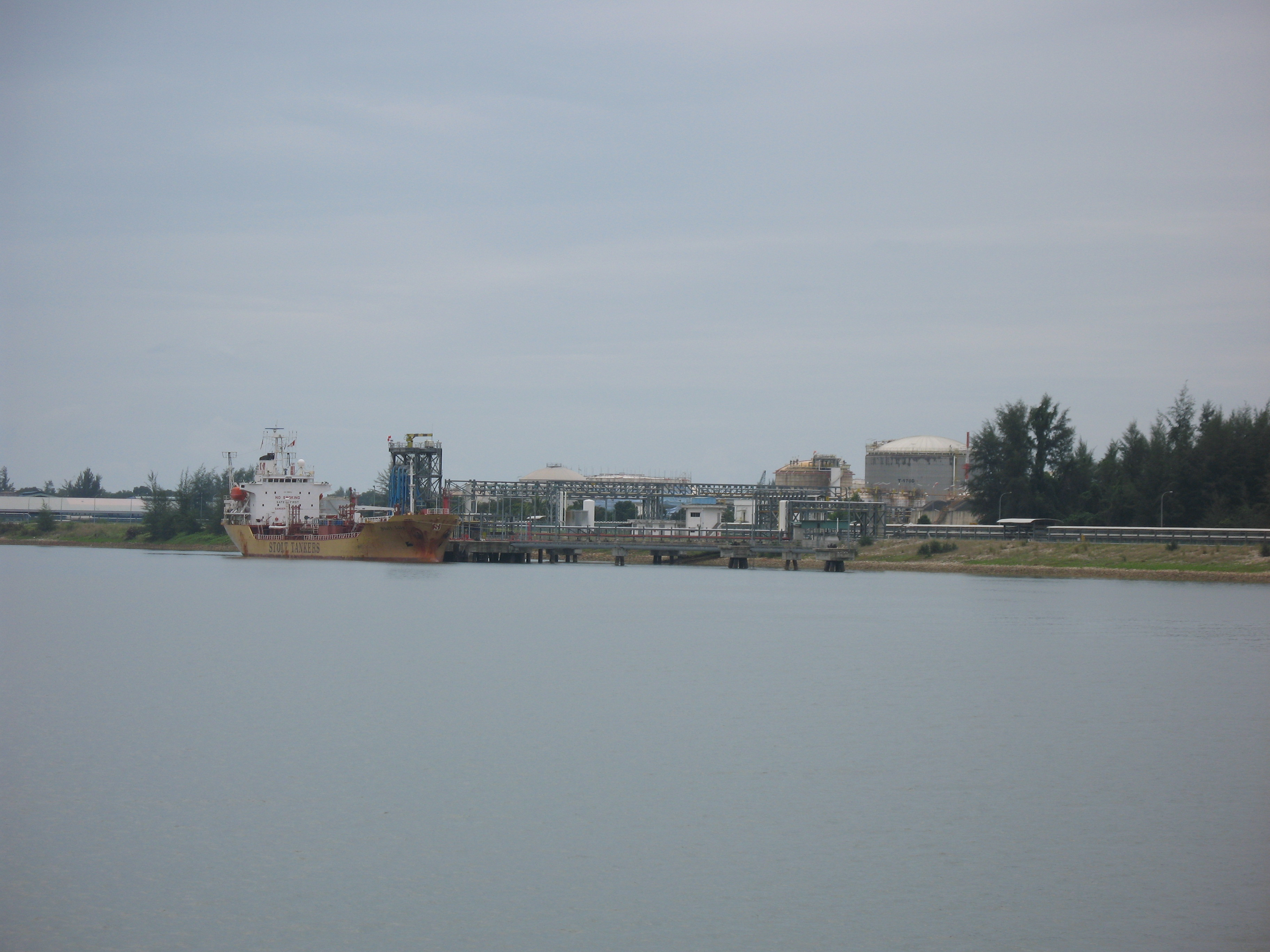
Cargo loading at one of the liquid chemical berths at Kuantan Port

The Kuantan Port (KP, Malay: Pelabuhan Kuantan) is the largest seaport in the East Coast region of Peninsular Malaysia. It is situated approximately 20 kilometres (12 mi) from Kuantan, the state capital city of Pahang, and facing the South China Sea.

Previously run by Kuantan Port Authority, it has been privatised since 1998 and is currently operated by Kuantan Port Consortium Sdn Bhd. The port is part of the 21st Century Maritime Silk Road.

== History ==
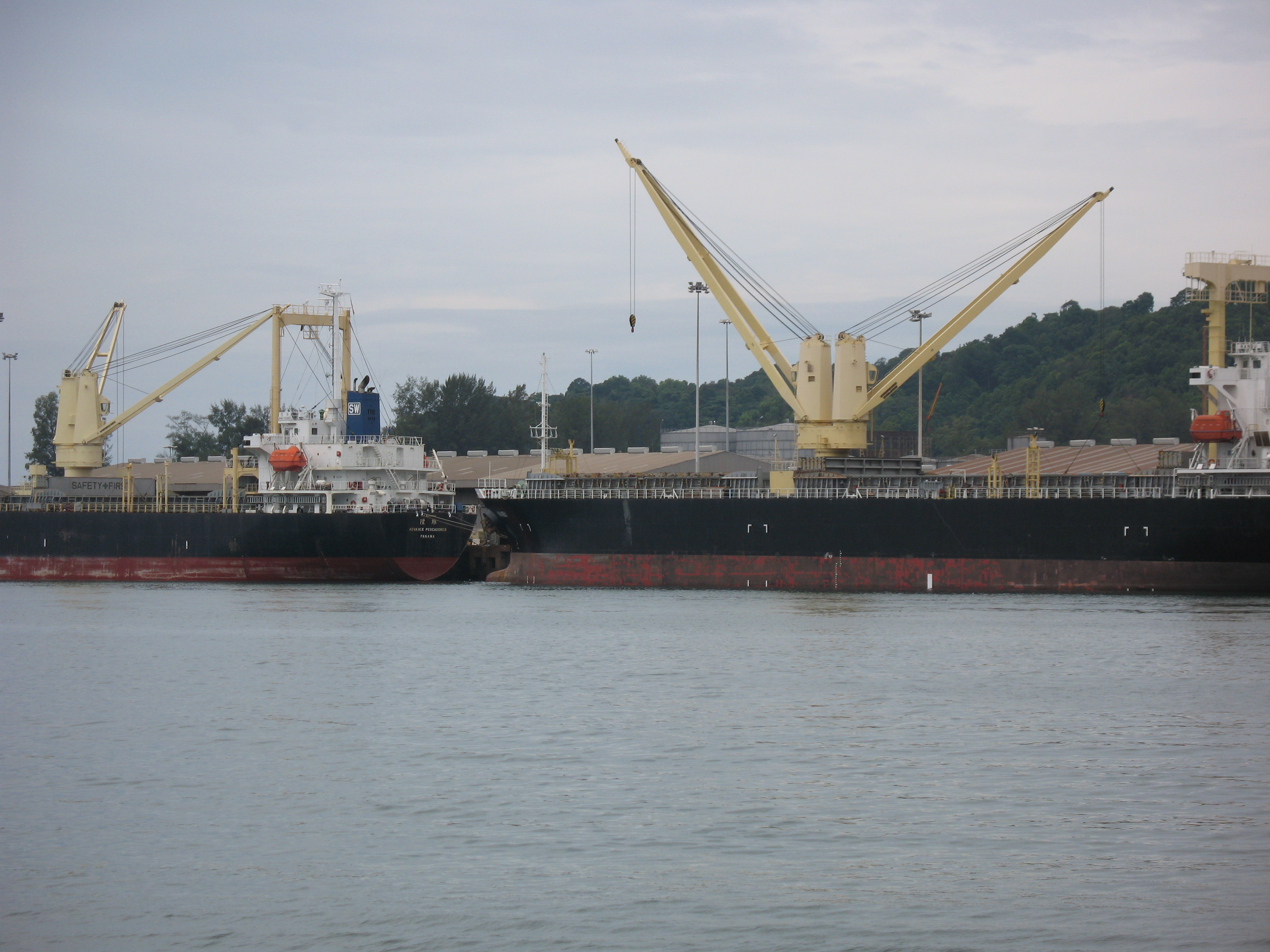
Ships alongside Kuantan Port's multi-purpose berth

- 1974 Kuantan Port Authority established
- 1976 Construction of Kuantan Port started
- 1979 Construction completed
- 1980 Partial operation
- 1984 Full operation
- 1998 Privatised and managed by Kuantan Port Consortium Sdn Bhd since
- 2001 Phase II Expansion (Inner Basin Project) completed
- 2003 Dedicated Container Berth operational

== Berth facilities ==
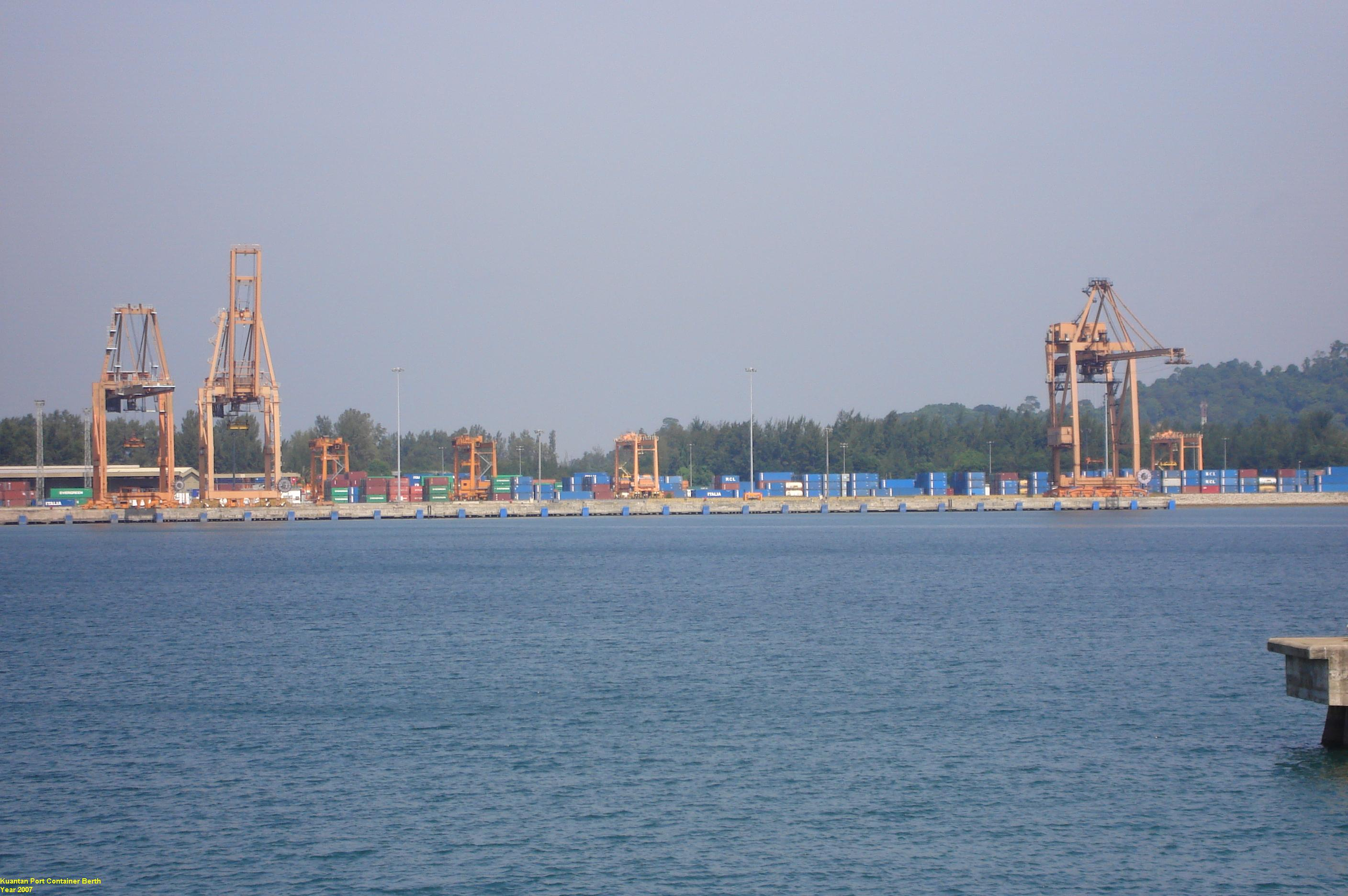
Kuantan Port Container Berth

Berth Specifications of Kuantan Port
| Type of Berth | Quantity of Berth | Total Length (Metre) | Draft (Metre) | Deadweight Tonnage (DWT) | Maximum Displacement Tonnes |
| Container | 3 | 600 | 11.2 | 35,000 | 45,000 |
| Liquid Chemical | 3 | 720 | 11.4 | 40,000 | 53,000 |
| Multi-purpose Berth | 4 | 725 | 11.2 | 35,000 | 45,000 |
| Palm Oil Berth No.1 | 1 | 250 | 11.5 | 40,000 | 54,000 |
| Palm Oil Berth No.2 | 1 | 150 | 8.0 | 6,000 | 8,000 |
| Palm Oil Berth No.3 | 1 | 240 | 11.4 | 40,000 | 53,000 |
| Mineral Oil | 1 | 150 | 8.0 | 6,000 | 8,000 |
| MTBE | 1 | 240 | 11.4 | 40,000 | 53,000 |
| Berth 5 | 1 | 18 | 5.0 | 10,377 | 16,832 |
| Berth 6 | 1 | 118 | 7.0 | 12,000 | 17,800 |
| Berth 1A | 1 | 70 | 8.0 | 6,000 | 8,000 |
| Service Jetty | 1 | 140 | 4.0 | 4,500 | 6,000 |

== Containerised cargo handling ==
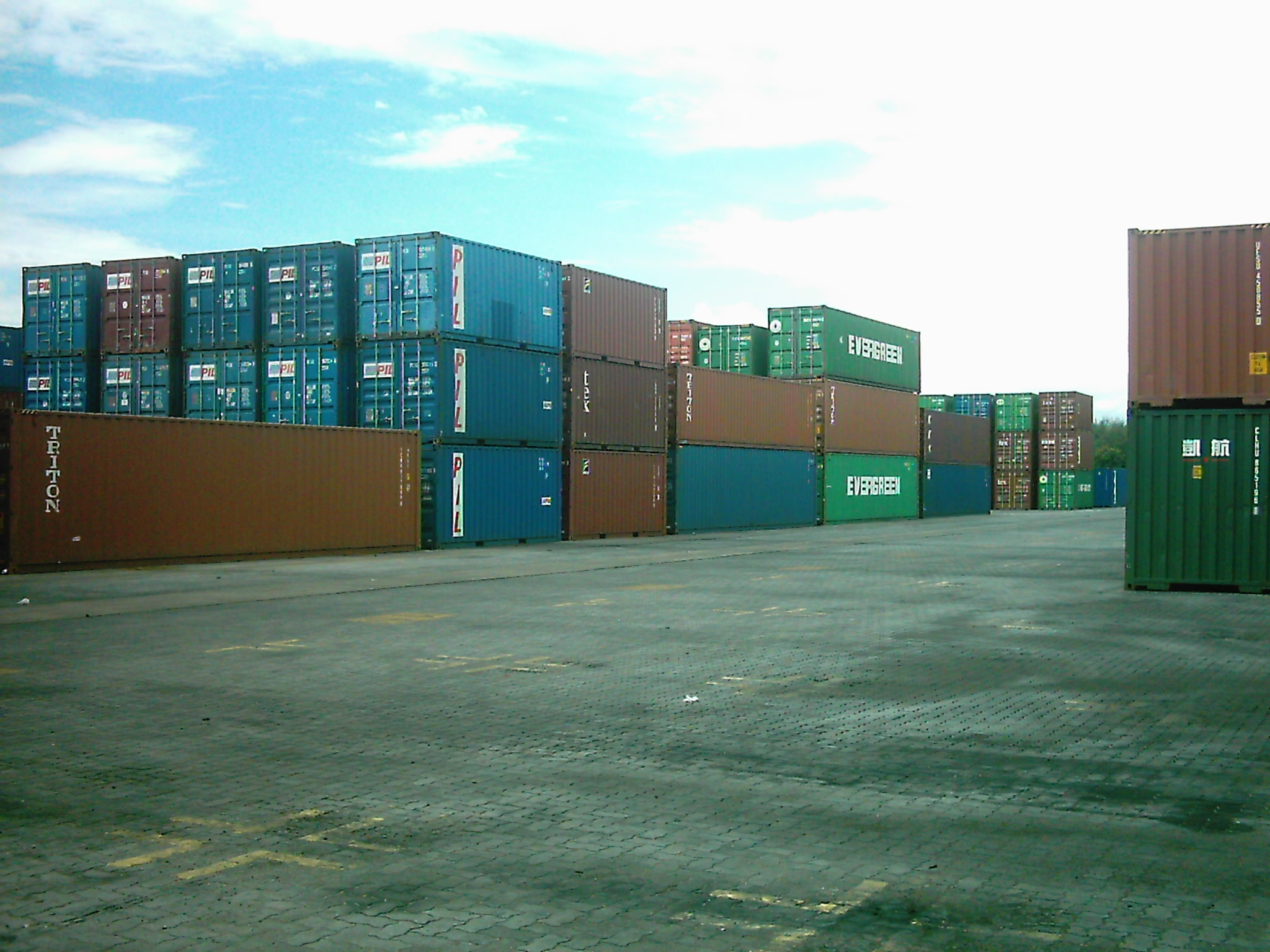
Kuantan Port Container Yard

Kuantan Port has containers handling equipment and machineries such as container gantry cranes, rubber tyred gantry cranes, reach stackers, container trailers and forklifts. It provides a container freight station of 9,600 square metres for the stuffing and unstuffing of containers and a container yard with 1,500 ground slots and 168 reefer points. Kuantan Port container yard offers one of the longest free storage period in Malaysia.

Kuantan - Kerteh Railway System (KKRS), a 75 km railway line, provides daily service between Kuantan Port and Kerteh's Petrochemical Complex.

== Gallery ==
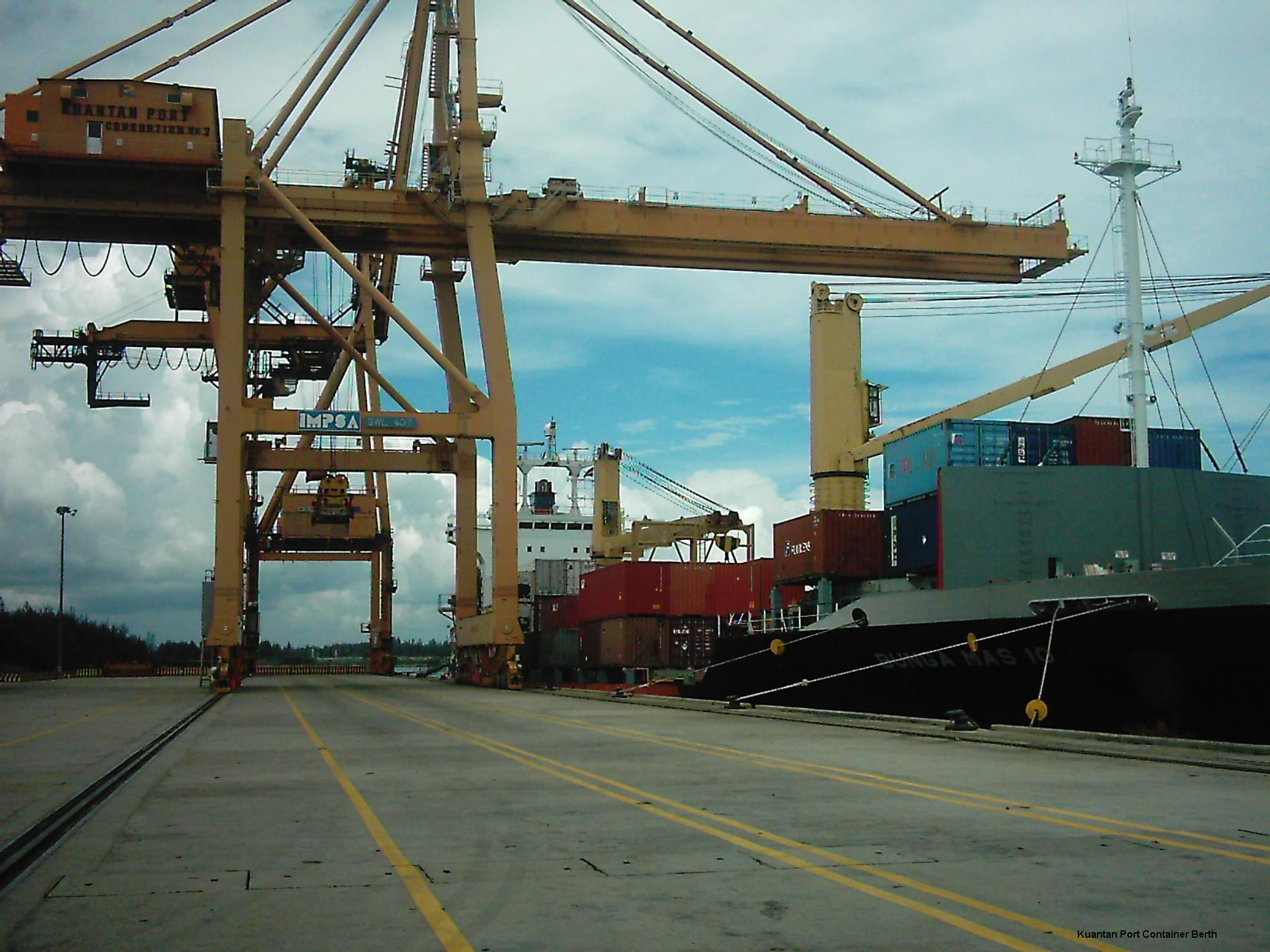
Kuantan Port Container Berth with gantry crane

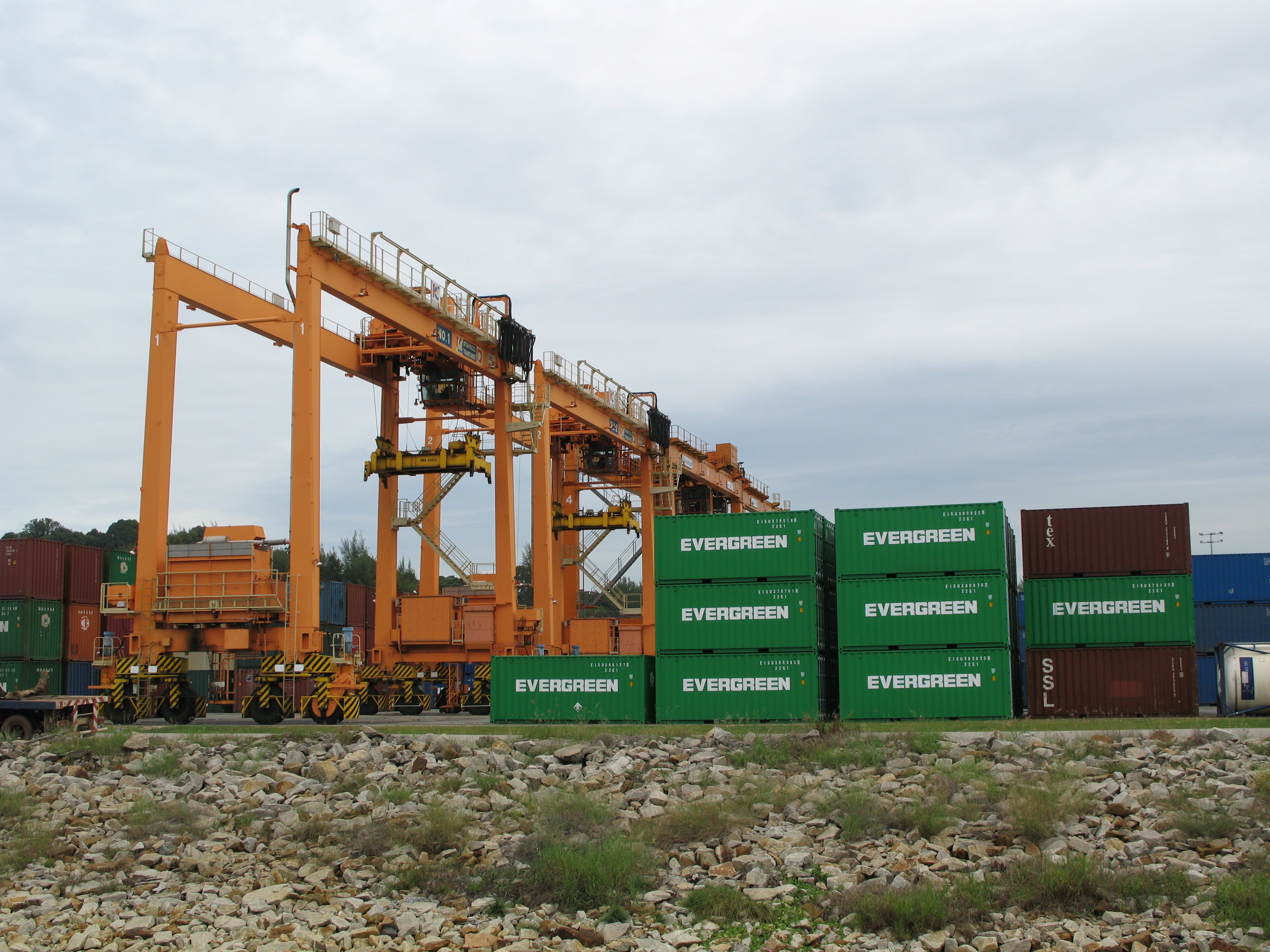
Kuantan Port Container Yard with RTG (Rubber Tyre Gantry) crane

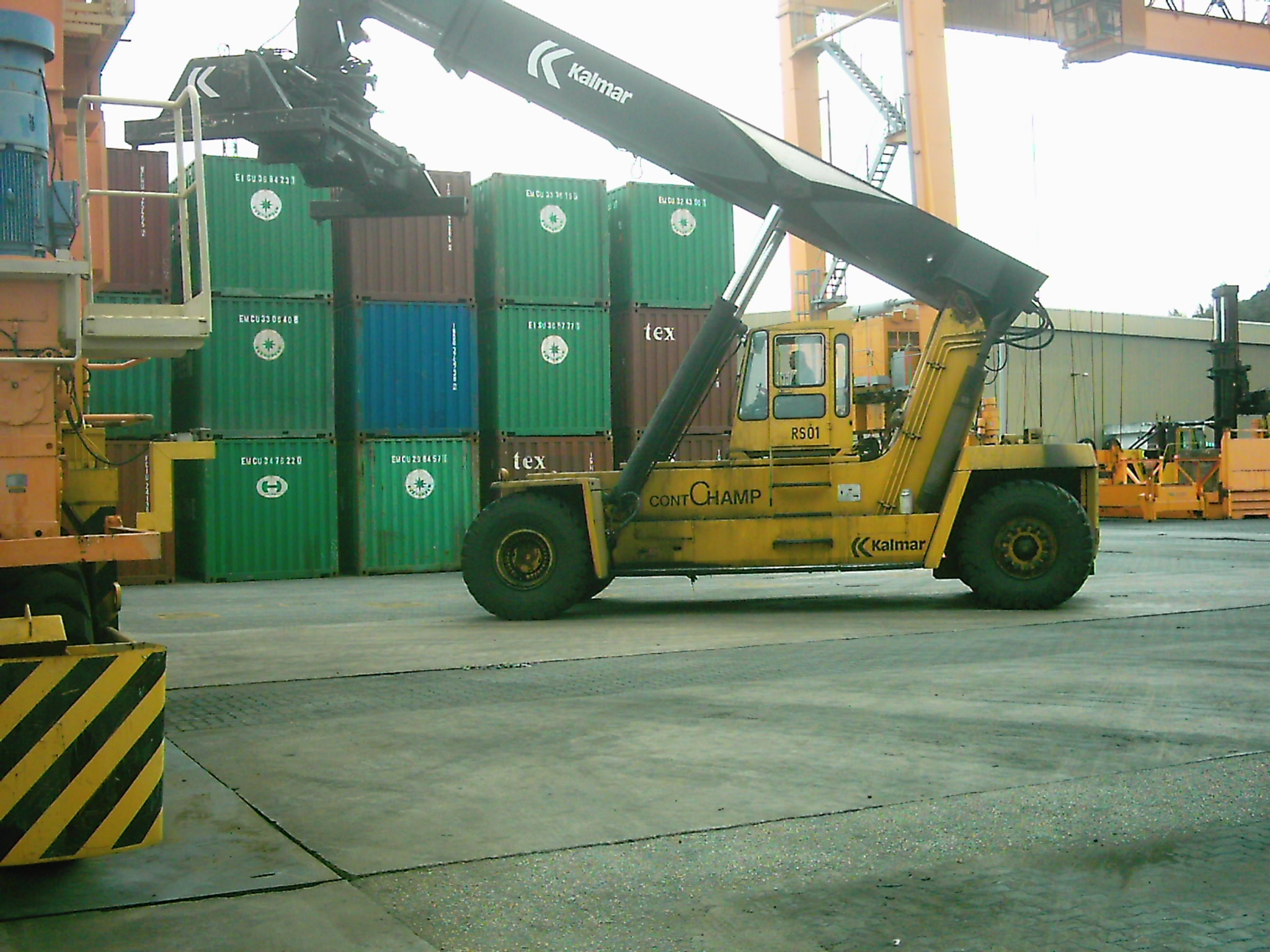
Kuantan Port with Reach Stacker in operation

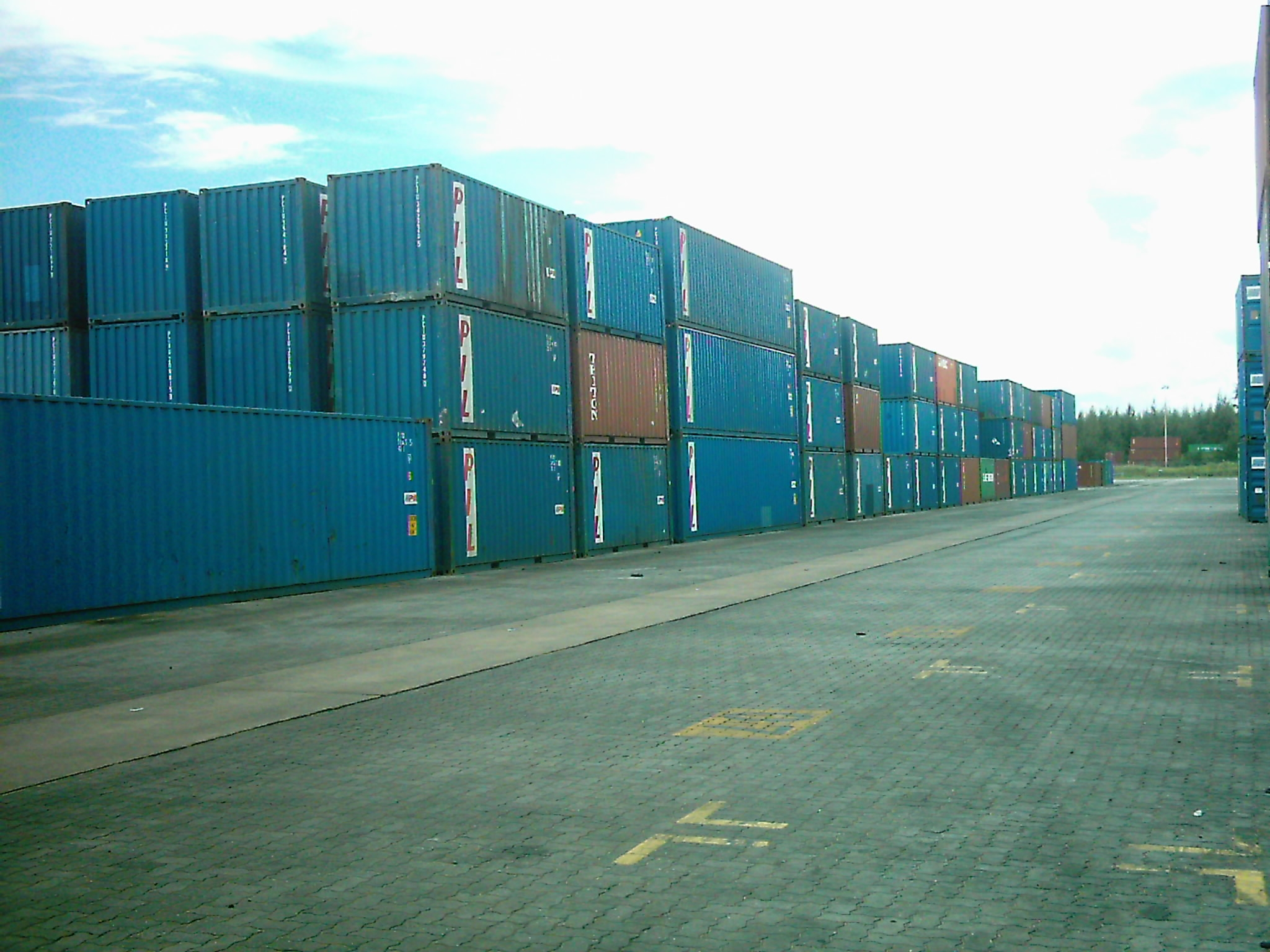
Kuantan Port Container Yard

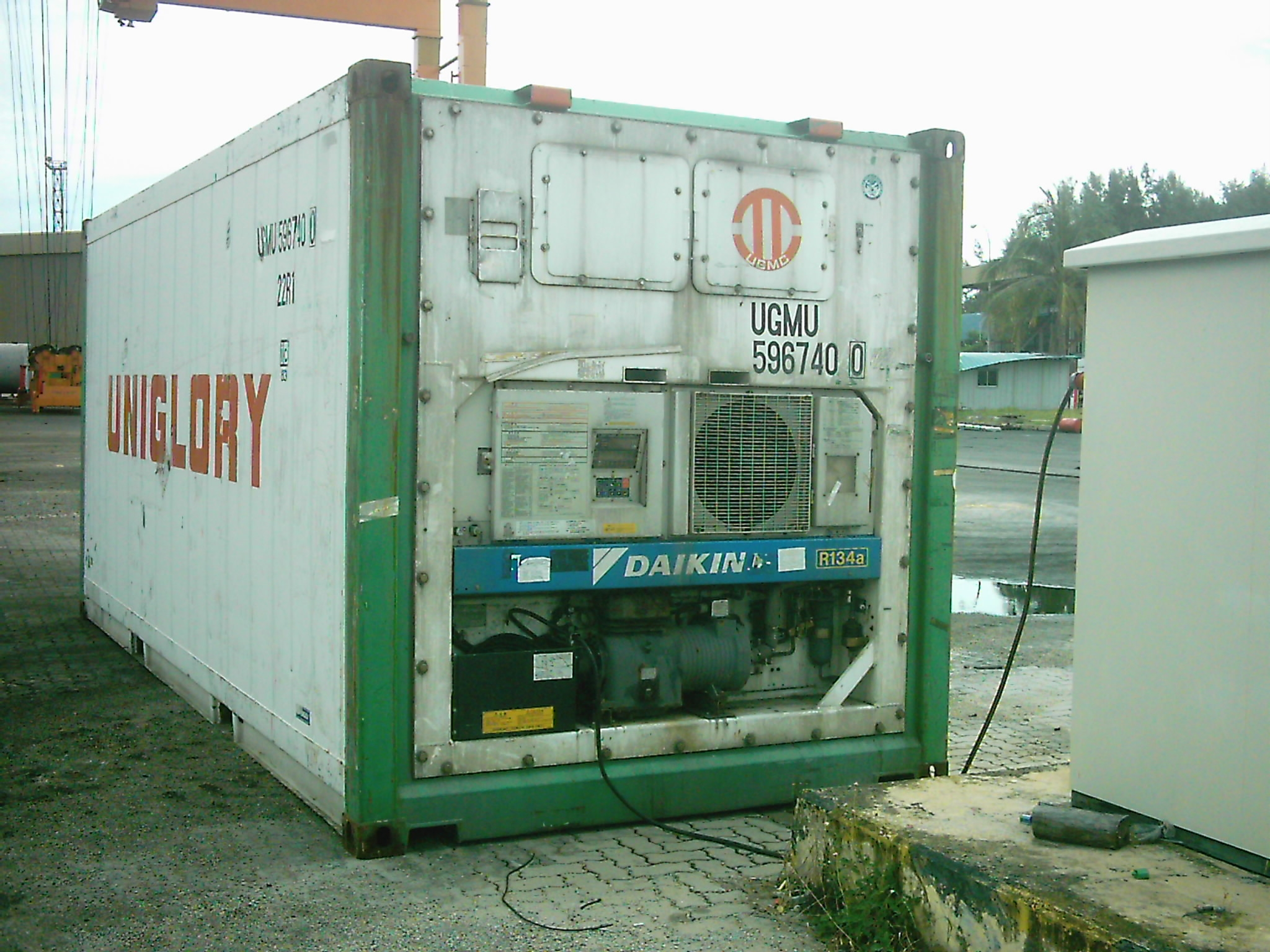
Kuantan Port Container Yard with Reefer Service

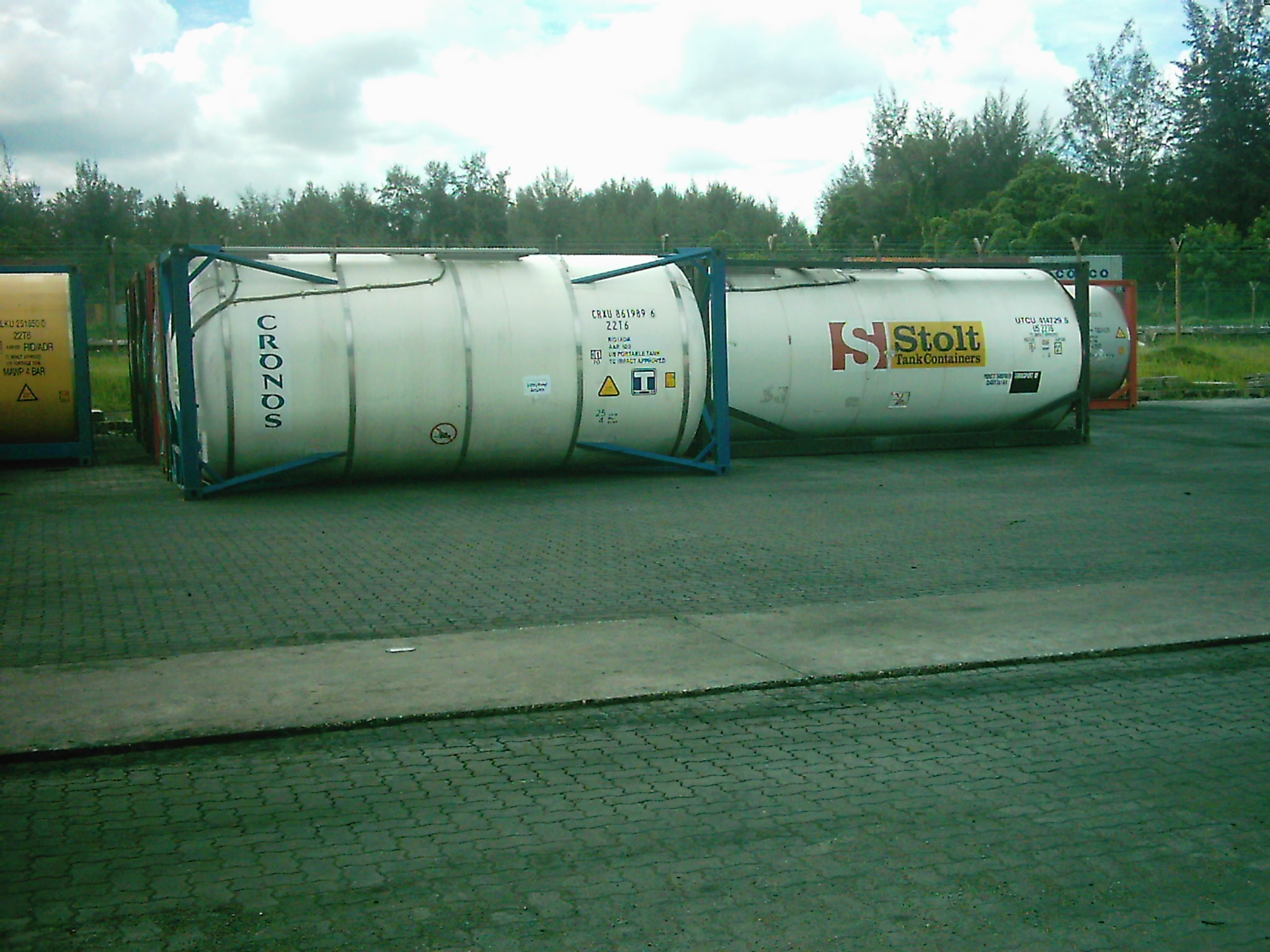
ISO Tanks stored at Kuantan Port Container Yard

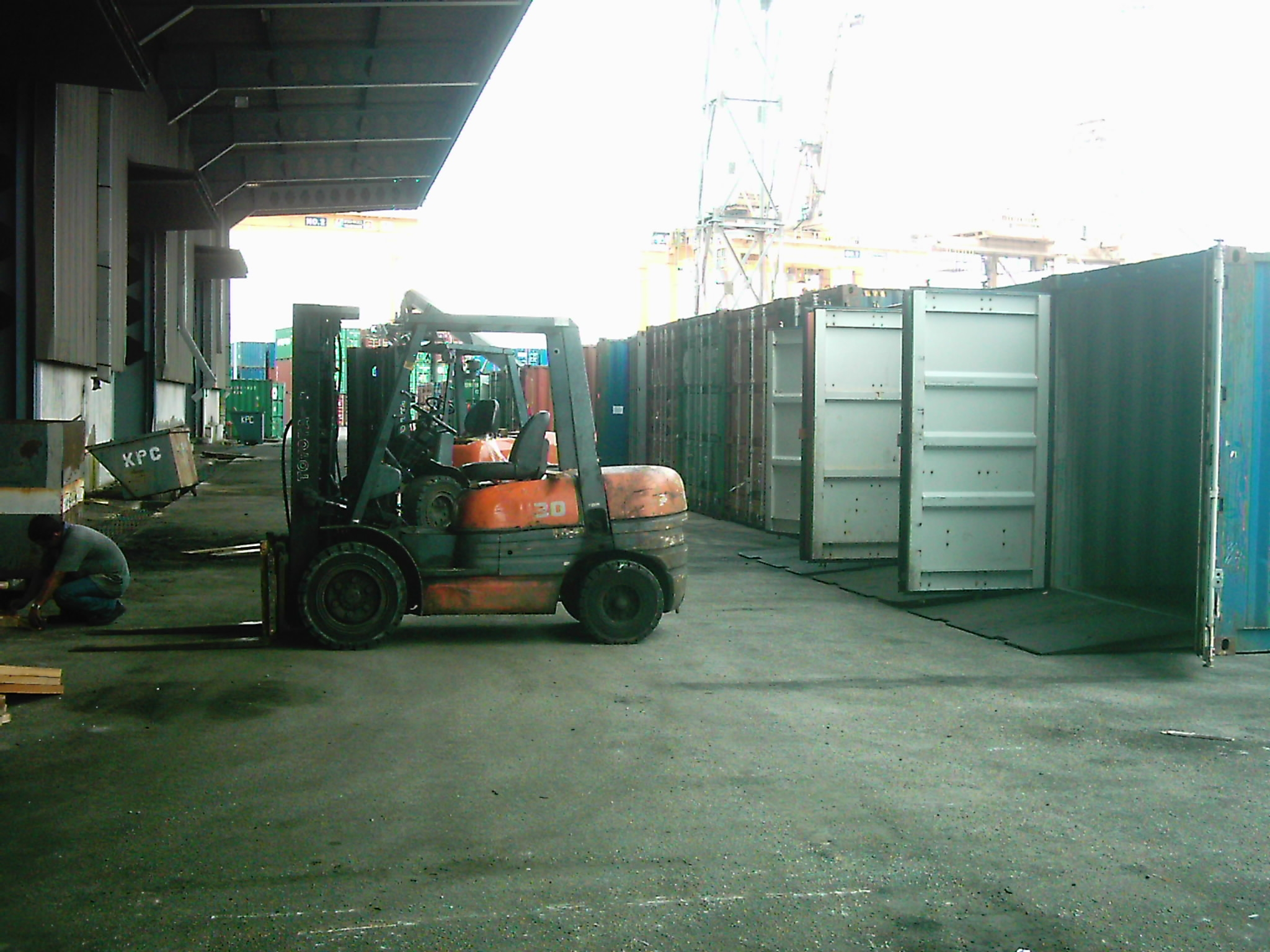
Container stuffing at Kuantan Port Container Freight Station (CFS)

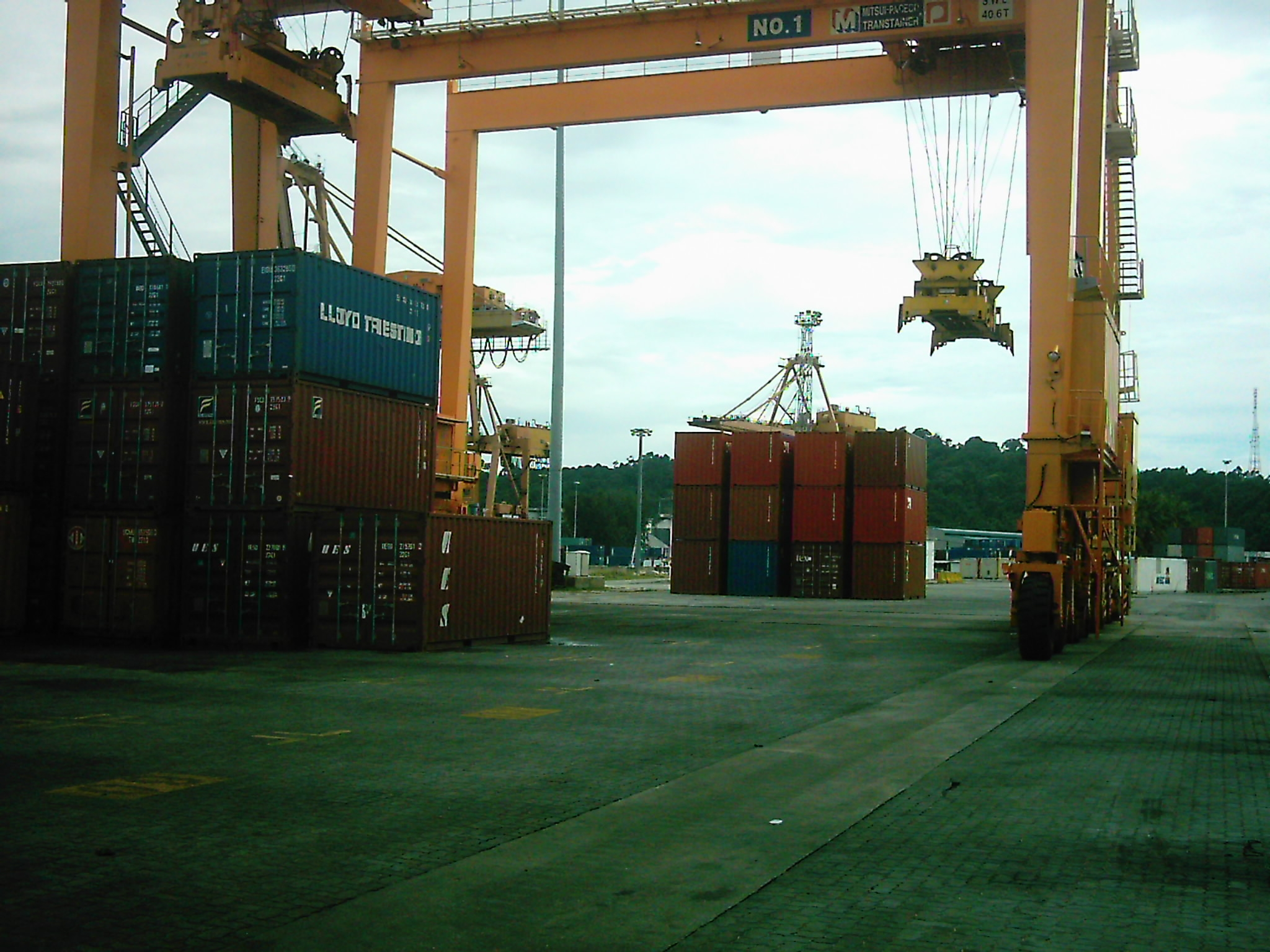
Rubber Tyred Gantry (RTG) in operation at Kuantan Port Container Yard

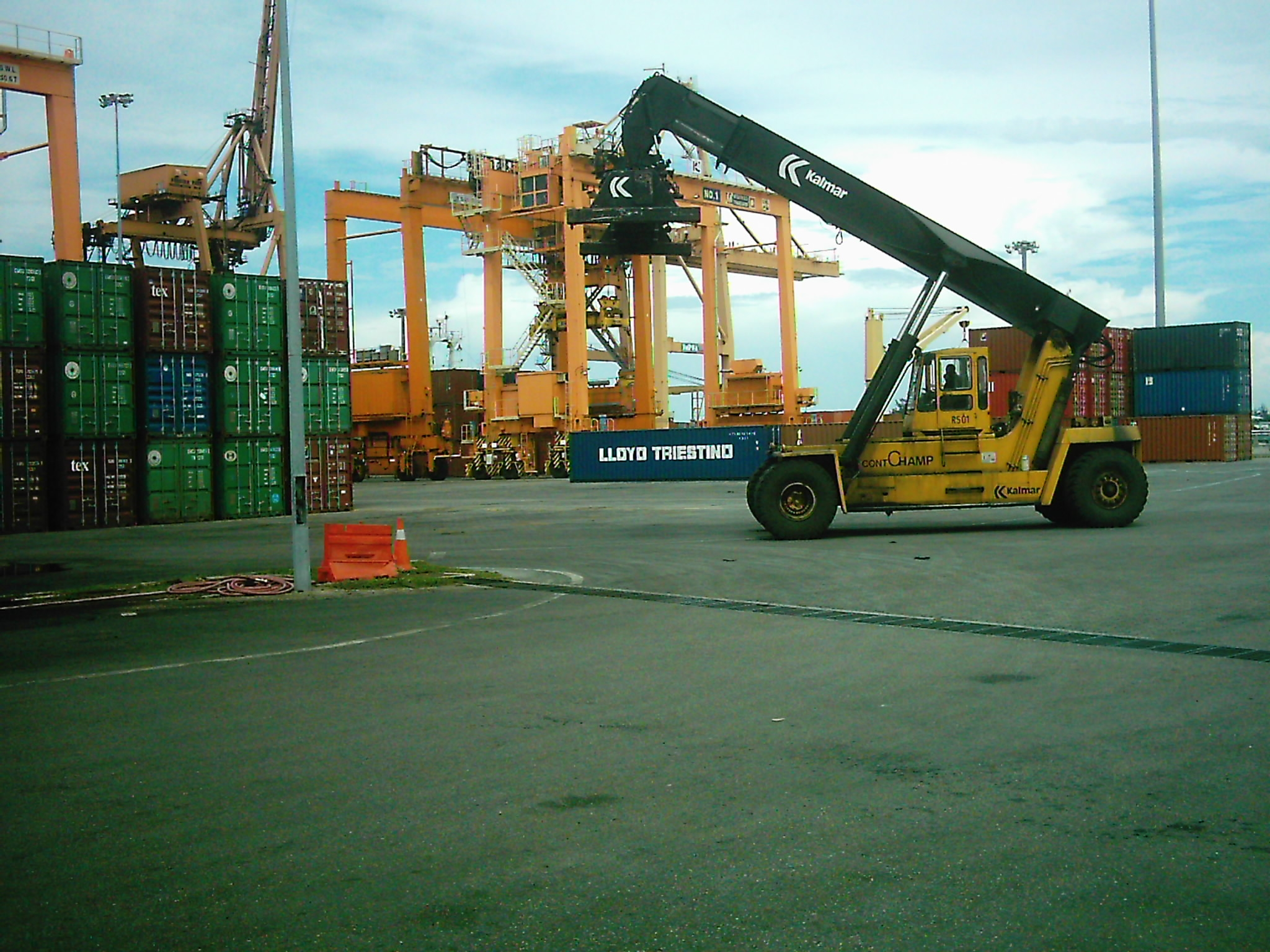
Reach Stacker in operation at Kuantan Port. Rubber Tyred Gantry visible at the background
