= Environment of Malaysia =

Malaysia is a Southeast Asian country straddling the South China Sea.

The environment of Malaysia is the biotas and geologies that constitute the natural environment of Malaysia. Malaysia's ecology is megadiverse, with a biodiverse range of flora and fauna found in various ecoregions throughout the country. Tropical rainforests encompass between 59% and 70% of Malaysia's total land area, of which 11.6% is pristine. Malaysia has the world's fifth largest mangrove area, which totals over a half a million hectares (over 1.2 million acres).

Human intervention poses a significant threat to the natural environment of this country. Agriculture, forestry and urbanisation contribute to the destruction of forests, mangroves and other thriving ecosystems in the country. Ecosystems and landscapes are dramatically altered by human development, including the construction of roads and damming of rivers. Geographical phenomena, such as landslides and flooding in the Klang Valley, along with haze, stem from widespread deforestation. Climate change occurs as a direct result of air pollution and the enhanced greenhouse effect, which in turn is caused by the emission of greenhouse gases. Low-lying areas near the coastline of Sabah and Sarawak are under threat from current sea level rise.

The environment is the subject of the Ministry of Natural Resources and Environment at the federal level. The Department of Wildlife and National Parks is responsible for the preservation of flora and fauna in Malaysia. Several environmental organisations have been established to raise awareness regarding the environmental issues in Malaysia.

== Biota ==
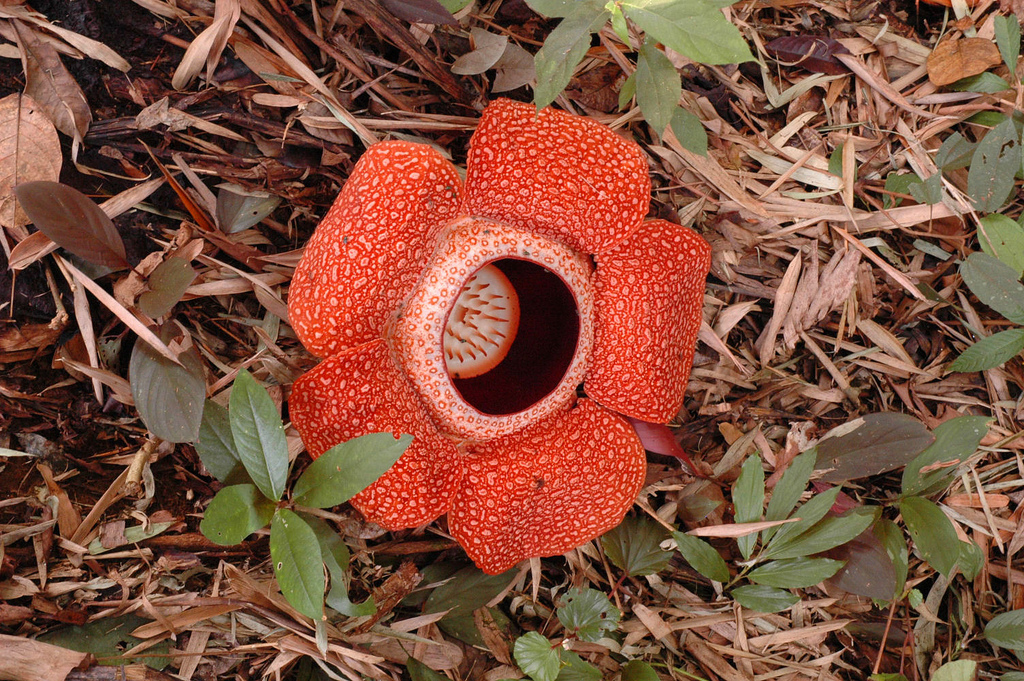
The rafflesia can be found in the jungles of Malaysia.

Malaysia is home to 15,500 species of higher plants, 746 birds, 379 reptiles, 198 amphibians, and 368 species of fish. There are also 286 species of mammals in Malaysia, of which 27 are endemic and 51 are threatened. Some of these mammals are found in both Peninsular Malaysia and East Malaysia. The former has 193 species of mammals, while the latter has 215. Among the mammals that are native to Malaysia include the Asian elephant, the Indochinese tiger, the leopard cat and the pot-bellied pig. Endangered species include the orangutan, the tiger, the Asian elephant, the Malayan tapir, the Sumatran rhinoceros and the Singapore roundleaf horseshoe bat. The tropical moist broadleaf forests of Peninsular Malaysia consist of 450 species of birds and over 6,000 different species of trees, of which 1,000 are vascular plants that occur naturally in karsts. The rainforests of East Malaysia are denser, with over 400 species of tall dipterocarps and semihardwoods.

The national flower of Malaysia is the Hibiscus rosa-sinensis, an evergreen that was introduced into the Malay Peninsula in the 12th century. The rafflesia is also widely found in the country.

=== Ecoregions and land use ===
There are various ecoregions in Malaysia with varying degrees of prevalence. Major forests account for 45% of all ecoregions in the country, interrupted woods represent 33%, major wetlands constitute 3%, grass and shrubs make up 2% while other coastal aquatic regions form 8% of the country's land area, with crops and settlements taking up the remaining space. Malaysia has many national parks, although most of them are de facto state parks. The Taman Negara National Park in central Peninsular Malaysia is 130 million years old, making it one of the oldest rainforests in the world.

The Matang Mangrove Forest, otherwise known as the Matang Mangrove Forest Reserve (MMFR), located in Perak in Peninsular Malaysia is about 40,000 hectares in size and is considered the largest stretch of mangrove forests in Peninsular Malaysia. Conservationists and local residents work together to maintain the Matang Mangrove Forest, and aside from five small fishing villages located inside the forest, the land is uninhabited. Since conservation efforts started in 1906, after it was designated as a permanent forest reserve and managed closely by the Forestry Department, the MMFR has become one of the world's best managed mangrove forests, utilizing a 30-year rotational conservation method involving two artificial tree thinnings occurring in 15 and 20 year-old blocks, and then a clear felling during the 30 year-old block.

About 41% of the land area is classified as "low human disturbance", 19% is categorised as "medium human disturbance" and 40% falls under the "high human disturbance" category. 2.7% of the land is totally protected, 1.77% is partially protected and 4.47% is totally or partially protected.

== Climate ==
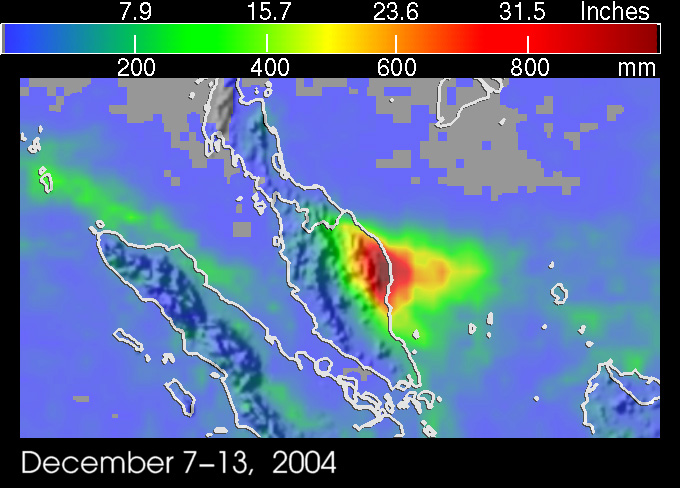
The precipitation map of Peninsular Malaysia in December 2004 shows heavy precipitation on the east coast, causing floods there.

Malaysia lies along the 1st parallel north to the 7th parallel north circles of latitude, roughly equal to Roraima (Brazil), the Democratic Republic of the Congo and Kenya. According to the Köppen climate classification system, Malaysia has a tropical rainforest climate due to its proximity to the equator. The country is hot and humid all year round, with an average temperature of 27 °C (80.6 °F) and almost no variability in the yearly temperature.

The country experiences two monsoon seasons, the Northeast Monsoon and the Southwest Monsoon. The Northeast Monsoon brings heavy rainfall to the east coast of Peninsular Malaysia and western Sarawak, while the Southwest Monsoon signifies dryer conditions throughout the country except Sabah. During the Southwest Monsoon, most states experience minimal rainfall due to the stable atmospheric conditions in the region and the Sumatran mountain range, which brings about the rain shadow effect. Sabah experiences more rainfall because of the tail effect of typhoons in the Philippines.

The urban heat island effect is caused by overdevelopment and general human activities in the cities of Malaysia.

=== Air Pollution Index ===
The Air Pollution Index (API) is used by the government to describe the air quality in Malaysia. The API value is calculated based on average concentrations of air pollutants, namely sulphur dioxide, nitrogen dioxide, carbon monoxide, ozone and fine dust (PM_{10}). The air pollutant with the highest concentration is the pollutant that will determine the value of the API. Fine dust is typically the dominant pollutant.

The API is reported on a scale starting from 0. A score of 0 to 50 is considered good, 51 to 100 is moderate, 101 to 200 is unhealthy, 201 to 300 is very unhealthy and anything higher than 300 is hazardous. A state of emergency is declared in the reporting area if the API exceeds 500, which occurred in Port Klang in 2005. Non-essential government services are suspended, and all ports and schools in the affected area are closed. Private sector commercial and industrial activities in the reporting area might be prohibited.

== Environmental law and conservation ==
In 1906, the Matang Mangrove Forest Reserve (MMFR) was designated as a permanent forest reserve and has been closely monitored and maintained by the Forestry Department since 1908.

The Environmental Quality Act of 1974 and other environmental laws are administered by the Division of Environment. Clean-air legislation was adopted in 1978, limiting industrial and automobile emissions. However, air pollutant remains a problem in Malaysian cities.

The National Forestry Act of 1984 was enacted for sustainable forest management, but the act has not been enforced.

=== Treaties and international agreements ===
Malaysia is a party to the following international environmental agreements:

- Convention on Biological Diversity,
- United Nations Framework Convention on Climate Change,
- United Nations Convention to Combat Desertification,
- Endangered Species,
- Hazardous Wastes,
- United Nations Convention on the Law of the Sea,
- Marine Life Conservation,
- Nuclear Test Ban,
- Ozone Layer Protection,
- Ship Pollution,
- Tropical Timber 83,
- Tropical Timber 94,
- Wetlands

Malaysia signed but did not ratify the Kyoto Protocol on climate change.

=== Environmental organisations ===
The following is a non-exhaustive list of several non-governmental organisations devoted to the preservation and conservation of the environment in Malaysia:

- Borneo Resources Institute Malaysia
- Centre for Environment, Technology & Development, Malaysia
- Centre for Environmental Technologies
- Environmental Management and Research Association of Malaysia
- Environmental Protection Society Malaysia
- Global Environment Centre
- Malaysian Karst Society
- Malaysian Nature Society
- Malaysian Society of Marine Sciences
- Partners of Community Organisations Saba
- Sabah Wetlands Conservation Society
- Socio-Economic and Environmental Research Institute
- Sustainable Development Network Malaysia
- TRAFFIC Southeast Asia
- Treat Every Environment Special Sdn Bhd
- Wetlands International (Malaysian chapter)
- World Wide Fund for Nature (Malaysian chapter)
- Water Watch Penang
- Wild Asia

== Environmental issues ==
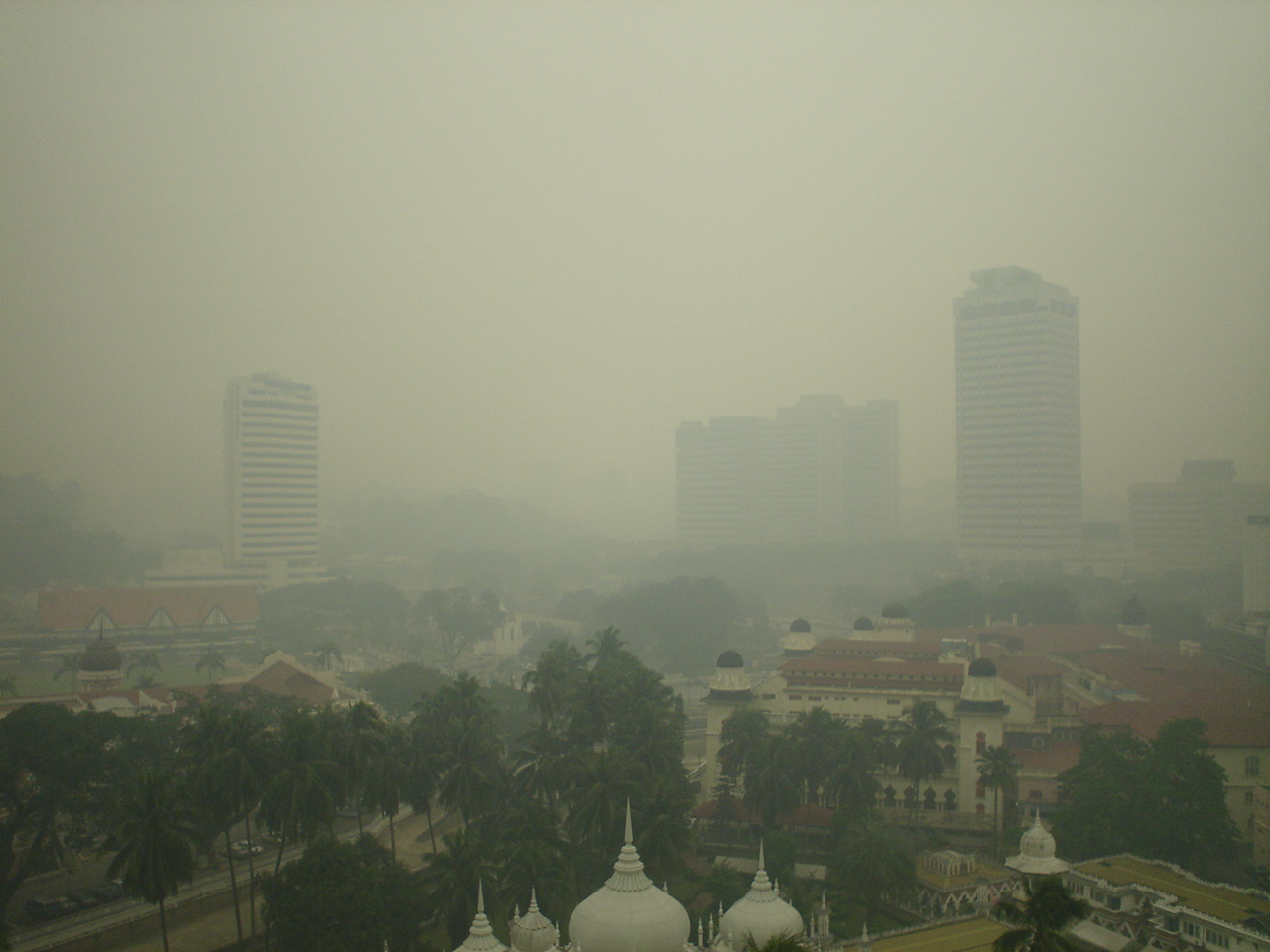
The 2005 Malaysian haze over Kuala Lumpur. Haze is one of the most serious environmental issues in Malaysia.

There are a number of environmental issues faced by Malaysia, such as deforestation and pollution. According to a study by Centre for Marine and Coastal Studies in 2008, about 30% of Malaysian coastline is subject to varying degrees of erosion. According to the United Nations, Malaysia's deforestation rate was the highest among tropical nations. The country's annual deforestation rate increased 86% between 1999–2000 and 2000–2005. Malaysia lost an average of 140,200 hectares of its forests or 0.65% of its total forest area every year since 2000, whereas in the 1990s, the country lost an average of 78,500 hectares, or 0.35 percent of its forests annually.

Widespread urbanisation, agricultural fires and forest conversion for oil palm plantations and other forms of agriculture are the main causes of Malaysia's high deforestation rate. Logging is responsible for forest degradation in the country, and local timber companies have been accused by environmental organisations of failing to practice sustainable forest management.

Mining in Peninsular Malaysia has left a mark on the environment. Deforestation, pollution of rivers, and siltation have resulted in losses of agriculture, and road projects have opened new areas to colonisation.

Air pollution from industrial and vehicular emissions is a major issue in the urban areas of Malaysia. Malaysia is ranked 42nd in the world in terms of vehicle ownership per capita, with 273 Malaysians having vehicles out of every 1000. Public transportation has been introduced in the form of bus networks and railway systems as mitigation, but utilisation rates are low.

Water pollution occurs due to the discharge of untreated sewage; the west coast of the Peninsular Malaysia is the most heavily populated area. 40% of the rivers in Malaysia are heavily polluted. The country has 580 cubic km of water, of which 76% is used for farming and 13% is used for industrial activity. Cities in Malaysia produce an average of 1.5 million tons of solid waste per year.

In 2000, Malaysia was ranked fourth in the world in terms of per capita greenhouse gas emissions after taking into account land use change with 37.2 tonnes of carbon dioxide equivalent per capita.

Periodic fires, which usually coincide with the events of el Niño, burn thousands of hectares of forests across Malaysia, especially in Malaysian Borneo. The haze originating from these fires and the fires in Kalimantan, Indonesia typically have adverse health effects on the populace, besides causing air pollution. In particular, the 1997 Southeast Asian haze, the 2005 Malaysian haze and the 2006 Southeast Asian haze were caused by slash and burn activities in neighbouring Indonesia.

On 23 June 2013, the air pollutant index (API) in Muar, Johor has spiked to 746 as of 7.00am, which is more than twice the standard hazardous levels according to the Department of Environment website on Sunday. Prime Minister Datuk Seri Najib Tun Razak has agreed to declare emergency status in Muar and Ledang with immediate effect after the API readings reached more than 750. He stated that the haze is due to the open-burning in Indonesia and he offered cloud seeding for them. However, the Indonesian Environment Minister Balthasar Kambuaya has identified eight companies with Malaysian links that are being investigated for burning in Riau and Jambi, that has led to the haze that is choking neighbouring countries Malaysia and Singapore. All schools in Selangor and Kuala Lumpur are also called to close for a day due to the haze situation worsening as of 5pm. The highest API ever recorded in Malaysia was in Sarawak in 1997 with a reading of 860. The Minister of Natural Resources and Environment Minister Datuk Seri G. Palanivel was flayed by Penang Chief Minister Lim Guan Eng for prioritising the pandas more than Malaysians, a RM25 million exhibition centre will be completed by November and two pandas will be transported from China. The minister also announced that he would be meeting his Indonesian counterpart this Wednesday to discuss about solutions to overcome the haze problem.

== See also ==
- Biodiversity of Borneo
- List of environmental issues
- Mangroves of the Straits of Malacca
- Recycling in Malaysia
