= Environmental issues in Malaysia =

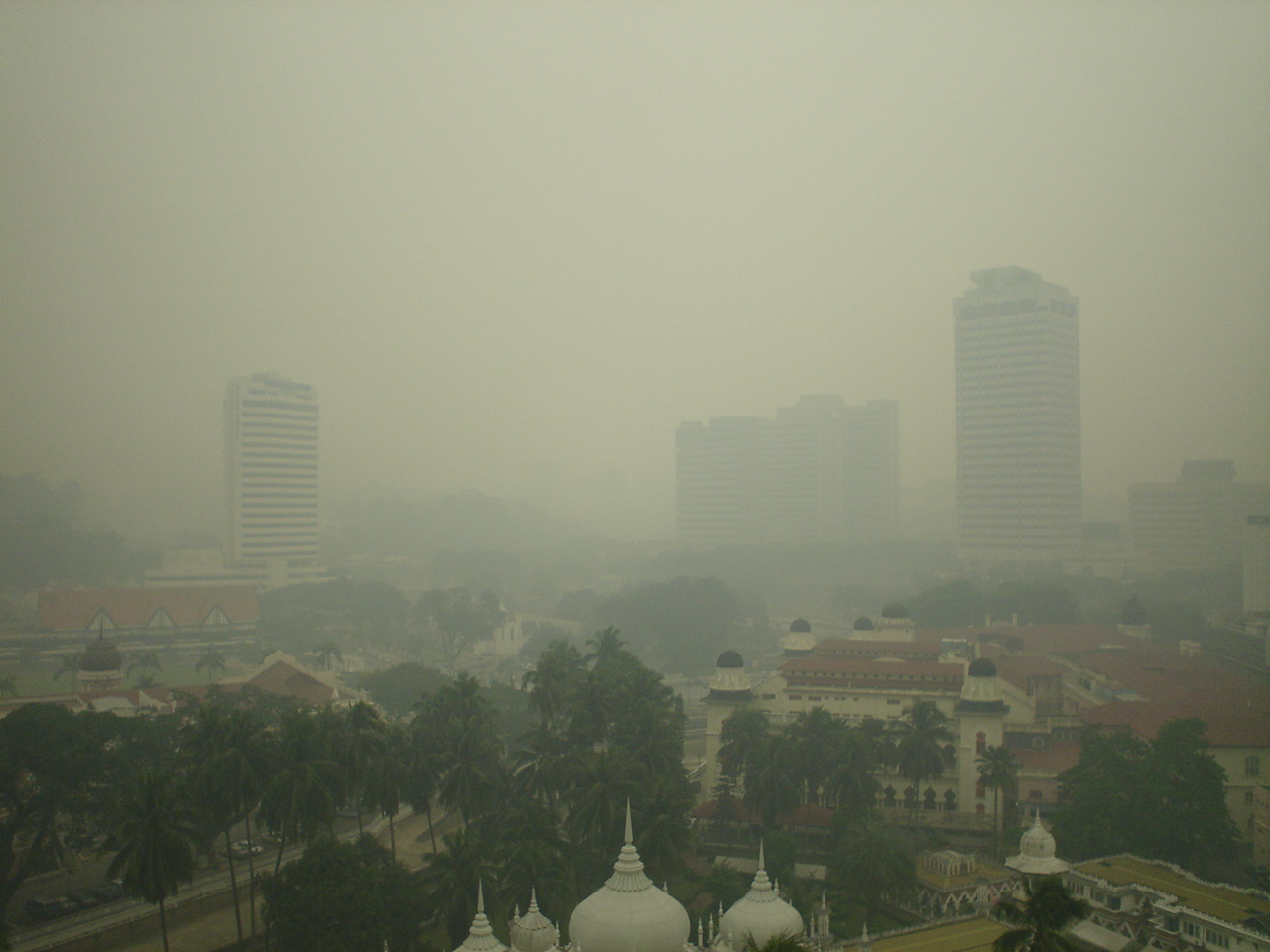
Haze over Kuala Lumpur in 2010.

Malaysia faces several environmental issues. Malaysia's environment possesses megadiverse biological diversity, with globally significant endemism and biodiversity, but is threatened by several issues. Deforestation is a major issue in the country that has led to many species becoming threatened with extinction. As a major economic sector, palm oil production has had a substantial environmental impact. Air pollution is also a major issue, with the country one of the most affected countries by seasonal Southeast Asian haze. The country is also affected by climate change.

== Issues ==
=== Climate change ===
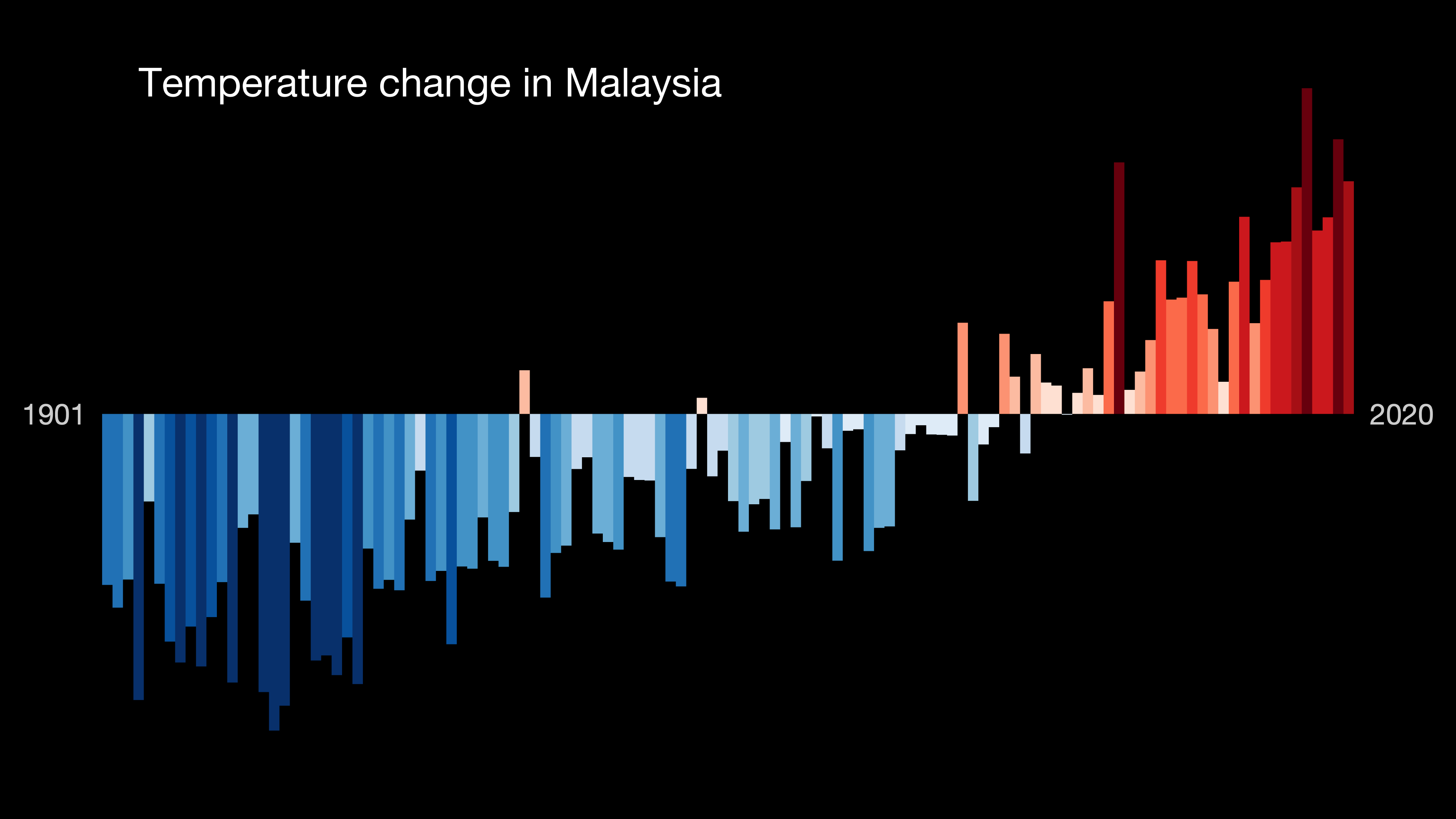
Graph showing temperature anomaly in Malaysia between 1901 and 2021.

Climate change is having a considerable impact in Malaysia. Increasing temperatures are likely to greatly increase the number of heatwaves occurring annually. Variations in precipitation may increase the frequency of droughts and floods in various local areas. Sea level rise may inundate some coastal areas. These impacts are expected to have numerous environmental and socioeconomic effects, exacerbating existing environmental issues and reinforcing inequality.

Malaysia itself contributes emissions given its significant use of coal and natural gas. However, the use of hydropower has expanded in the 21st century, and other potential energy sources such as solar power and biomass are being explored. The government anticipates the need to adapt in areas such as health and coastal defences, and has ratified the Paris Agreement.

=== Endangered species ===
- Borneo pygmy elephant
- Sumatran rhinoceros
- Malayan tiger
- Orangutan
- Oriental darter
- Storm's stork
- Milky stork

=== Deforestation ===
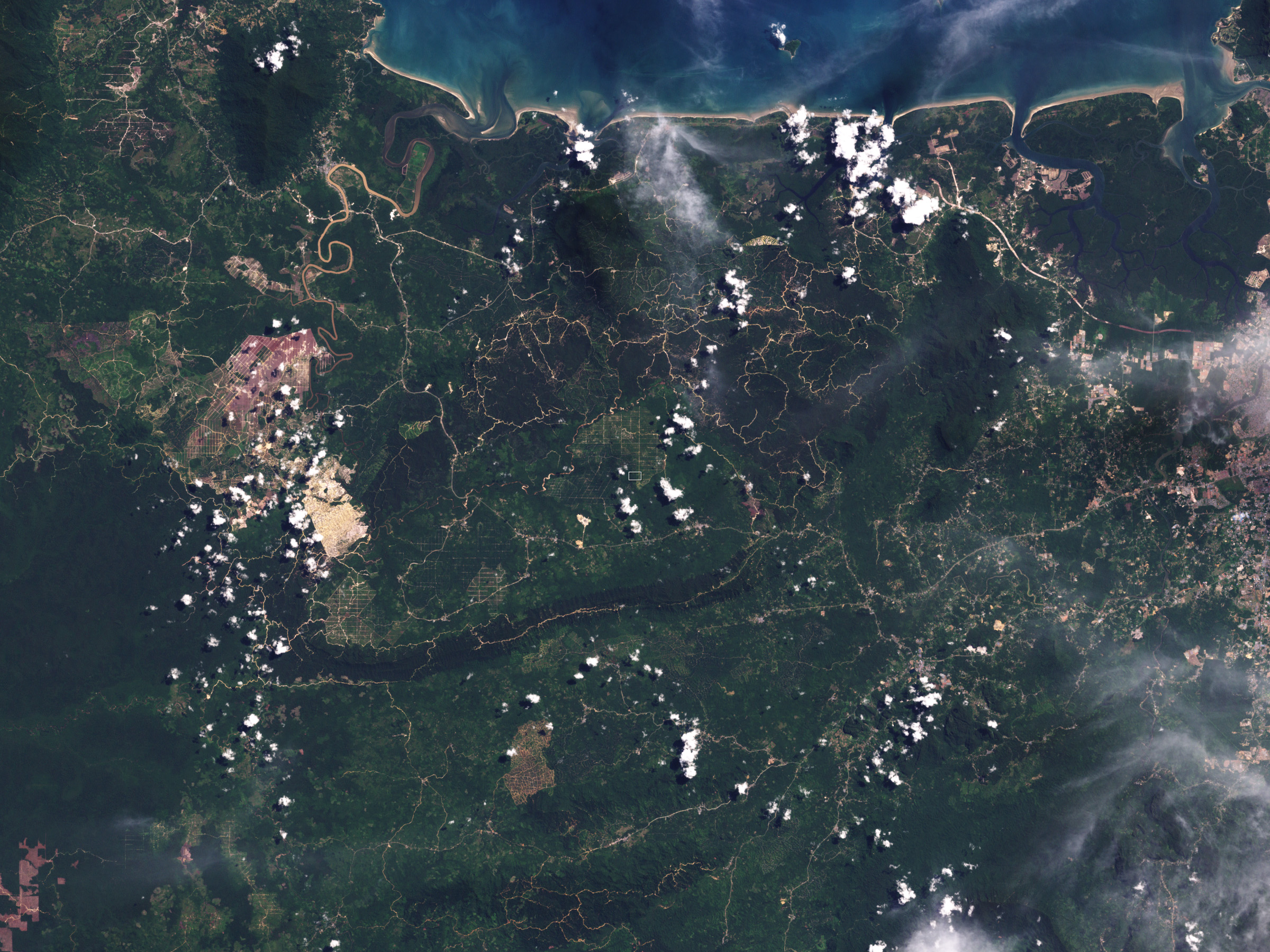
This image reveals the overall extent of land-cover change throughout the region.

Deforestation in Malaysia is a major environmental issue in the country. British colonial deforestation efforts began in 1880 and were rapidly driven by commercial rubber and palm oil cultivation.

Between 1990 and 2010, Malaysia lost an estimated 8.6% of its forest cover, or around 1,920,000 hectares (4,700,000 acres). Logging and land clearing has particularly been driven by the palm oil sector. World Bank policies in the 1970s encouraged palm oil expansion and the IMF’s bailout package, following the 1998 economic crisis, incentivised the expansion of palm plantations. However, as a megadiverse country, efforts have been made to conserve Malaysia's forests and reduce the rate of deforestation.

The following are notable projects contributing to deforestation:

- Hulu Terengganu Hydroelectric Project
- Kelau Dam
- Bukit Cherakah
- Pulai River
- Sungai Mas

Malaysia had a 2018 Forest Landscape Integrity Index mean score of 5.01/10, ranking it 111th globally out of 172 countries.

=== Pollution ===
Air pollution in Malaysia is a major issue, with the country one of the most affected by seasonal Southeast Asian haze.

- 1982 Bukit Merah radioactive pollution
- 2019 Kim Kim River toxic pollution

=== Reclamation ===
Coastal reclamation is damaging mangroves and turtle nesting sights.

=== Recycling and waste management ===
The country has numerous waste and recycling policies and initiatives but overall low rate of recycling and problems with violations and enforcement of such laws and policies.

== Controversial projects and policies ==
| Project/Area affected | Activity | State | Began | Notes | Ref. |
|---|---|---|---|---|---|
| Bakun Dam | Dams | Sarawak | 2008 | Forest loss. | |
| Kuala Lumpur Outer Ring Road (KLORR) | Highways | Selangor | 2008 | Forest fragmentation in the Selangor State Park. | |
| Forest Plantation Development | Plantation | Selangor | 2008- | Clearance of natural forest for timber plantations. | |
| Empire Residence Development | Housing | Selangor | 2008- | Hillslope clearance. | |
| Pan Borneo Highway | Highway | Sarawak/Sabah | 2016 | Forest loss, Brunei sections and the Temburong Bridge project and its implications to Limbang | |

== Environmental organisations ==
- Malaysian Nature Society
- Global Environment Centre
- Klima Action Malaysia

== See also ==
- Environment of Malaysia
- Deforestation in Malaysia
- Climate change in Malaysia
- List of environmental issues
