= Deforestation in Malaysia =

Climate emergency issue in Malaysia

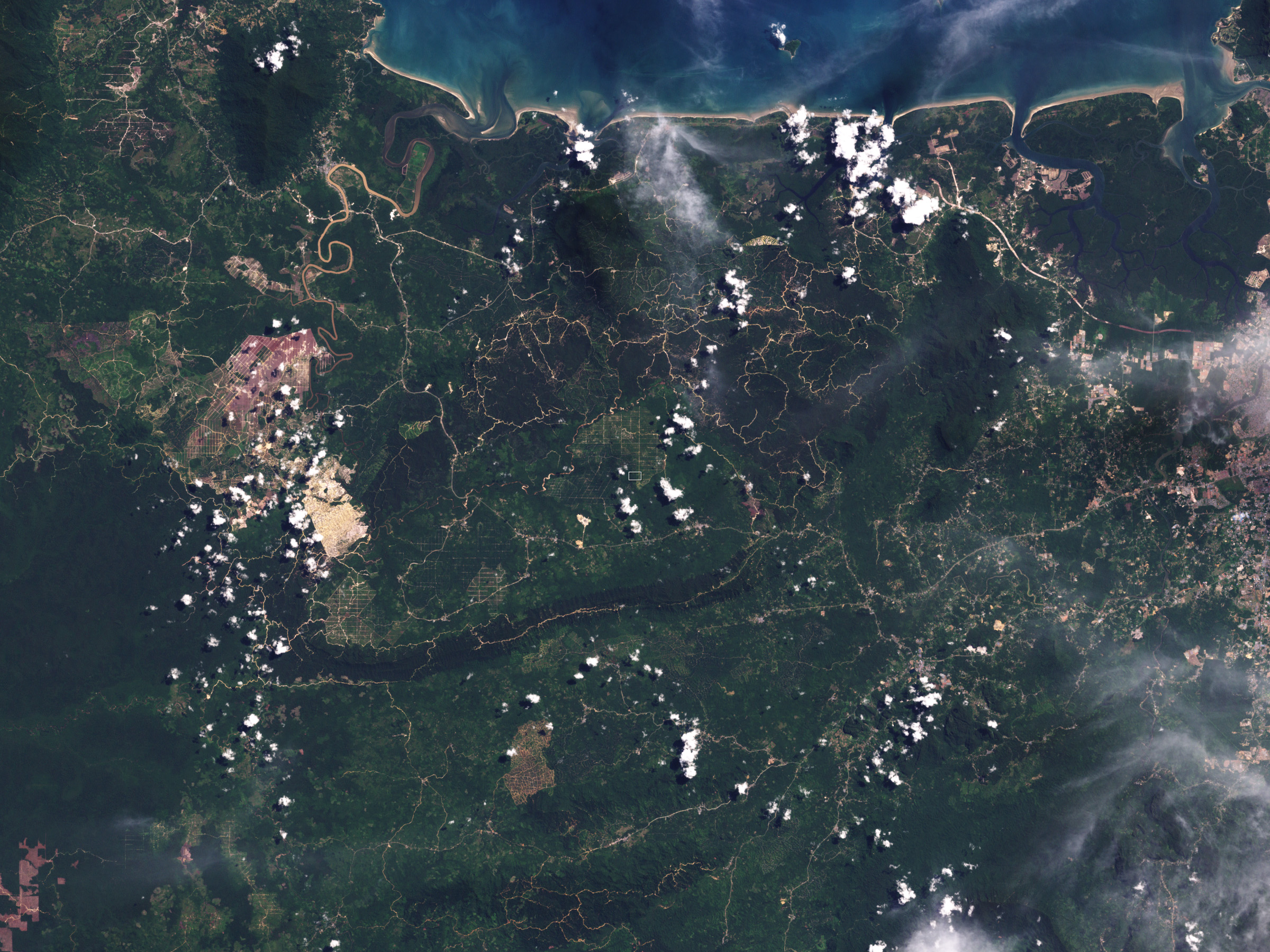
This image reveals the overall extent of land-cover change throughout the region.

Deforestation in Malaysia has taken place on an industrial scale. Malaysia is megadiverse country endowed with large tracts of tropical rainforest. In British Malaya, deforestation began in 1880 and was driven by the expansion of commercial rubber and palm oil cultivation. Between 1990 and 2010, Malaysia lost an estimated 8.6% of its forest cover, or around 1,920,000 hectares (4,700,000 acres). Logging and land clearing has particularly been driven by the palm oil sector. World Bank policies in the 1970s encouraged palm oil expansion and the IMF’s bailout package, following the 1998 economic crisis, incentivised the expansion of palm plantations. In recent decades, conservation efforts have attempted to protect Malaysia's forests and reduce the rate of deforestation.

== Background ==
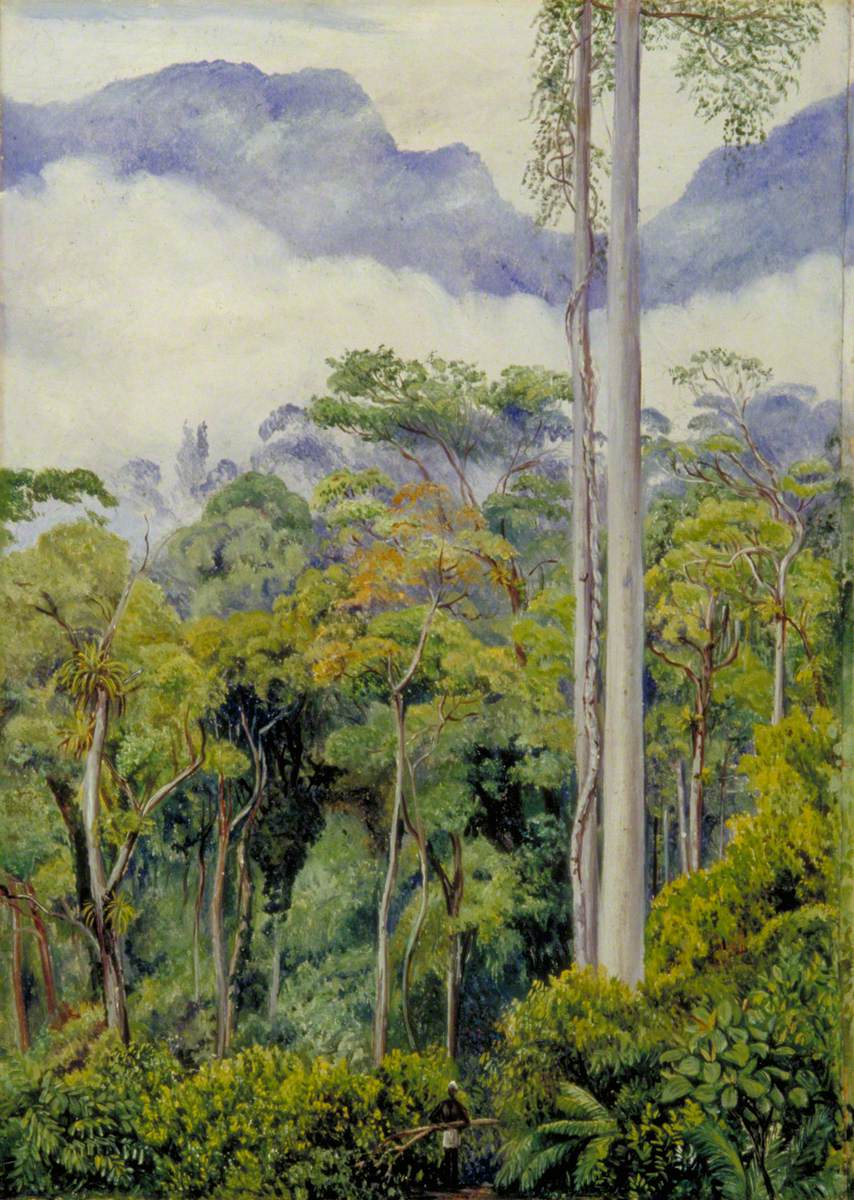
Road Making in the Tegora Forest, Sarawak, Borneo (1876) by Marianne North.

British colonial deforestation efforts accelerated from 1880, driven by commercial rubber and palm oil cultivation and investment under the lobbying of English botanist, Henry Ridley. By the 1920s over 2.1 million acres of land had been deforested by the Empire in Malaya.

Malaysia declared its independence from Britain in 1957, and formed its current state in 1963. Since then, it has seen significant economic growth, a large part of which can be attributed to its forest industry. Malaysia's rapid rate of development has put it far ahead of several of its neighbours, such as Indonesia and Papua New Guinea. This has largely been in part to its abundance of natural resources, which constitutes significant portions of the country's economy. Because of this large financial gain from logging, production has been high since initiation, and it was not until 1985 that consequences were first realised.

== Economics ==
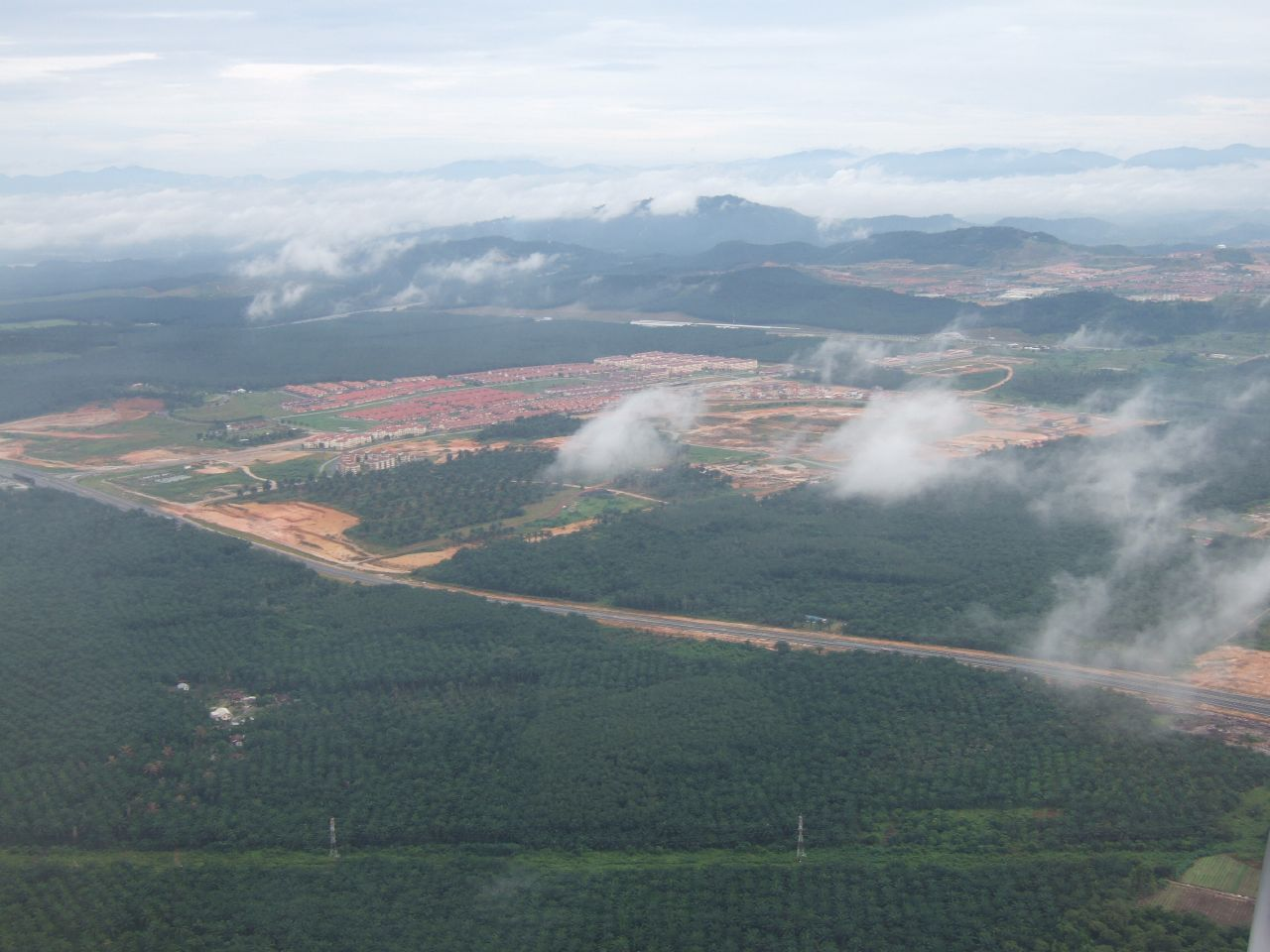
Oil palm plantations in Sarawak, Malaysia

Malaysia has received considerable financial gain from its logging industry. One statistic states this benefit is valued at US$2,150,000,000. Together with neighbouring Indonesia, Malaysia produces 85% of the global supply of palm oil, the chief cause of logging. Additionally, the agriculture sector accounts for 14.5% of the labour force – more than 1 in 7 persons. 56.6% of Malaysia's tropical forests are used for production, leaving the rest for uses such as 'Protection' and 'Conservation'.

== Impacts ==
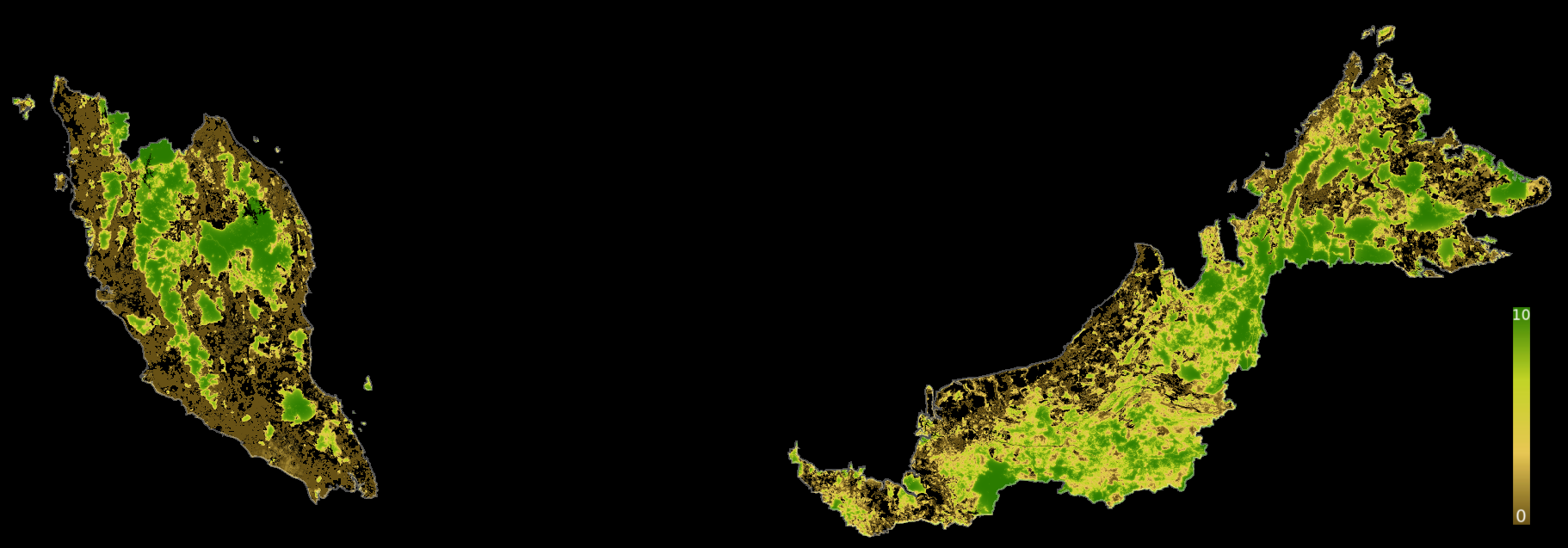
Forest Landscape Integrity Index map of Malaysia for 2019.

Consequences have been varied across different parts of Malaysia. However, all areas have suffered some effect from deforestation. Four of the most prominent include:

- Malaysia ranks as the 21st most biodiverse country in the world, with 2,199 endemic species. 18% of these species are listed as 'threatened', and because they are endemic, if Malaysia fails to conserve them, extinction will result.
- Indigenous peoples in Malaysia have always depended on the rainforest for medicine, shelter, food, and other necessities. They are not known to take more than what they need as this would be seen as a transgression of the forest and would bring curses to their people. The destruction of their prime resource is resulting in the destruction of their traditional ways of life. As the forest disappears, so does their culture.
- Runoff has also increased. Though it would not be immediately suspected that logging deep in the jungle could affect a distant city on the coast, because there is less forested area to soak up rainwater and act as a slow-release reservoir, sudden floods are becoming more and more frequent.
- An increased rate of mudslides have been reported.

== Conservation efforts ==
In Malaysia, the World Bank estimates that trees are being cut down at 4 times the sustainable rate. Logging does not have to be as destructive a practice as it currently is in Malaysia. In the past 2 decades, Malaysia has moved towards diversifying its economy, but logging still draws in many because of poor regulation and high profit. The most effective way to combat the negative effects of logging would be tighter regulation that still allows high production of palm oil, but in a more sustainable manner. This way, not only will the effects be mitigated now, but there will be more forests to log, and thus profits to make, in the future.

As of 2013, Malaysia still has a relatively high forest coverage percentage. It was estimated that 59.9% of the total area is covered by forests, of which, a sizeable portion are untouched virgin forests (see old-growth forests) which dates back to around 130 million years.

An increase in the level of awareness of Malaysians compounded with the local folk belief that existed in the indigenous populations (see Semai people) has added to the strength of the many Malaysian movements in environmentalism. The Malaysian Nature Society is active in advocating protection of forest. Other organisations such as the Tabung Alam Malaysia, a branch of the World Wide Fund For Nature has also established offices in Malaysia since 1972 dedicated to nature conservation as well as education on the importance of forest conservation to the wider populace. The Forest Research Institute Malaysia has also been actively conducting research on the biodiversity of Malaysia's forests as well as in conservation.

== Tree cover extent and loss ==
Global Forest Watch publishes annual estimates of tree cover loss and 2000 tree cover extent derived from time-series analysis of Landsat satellite imagery in the Global Forest Change dataset. In this framework, tree cover refers to vegetation taller than 5 m (including natural forests and tree plantations), and tree cover loss is defined as the complete removal of tree cover canopy for a given year, regardless of cause.

For Malaysia, the dashboard reports that from 2001 to 2024 the country lost about 9,513,550 ha (95,135.5 km^{2}) of tree cover (about 32% of its 2000 tree cover area). For tree cover density greater than 30%, country statistics report a 2000 tree cover extent of 29,444,768 ha (294,447.68 km^{2}). The charts and table below display this data. In simple terms, the annual loss number is the area where tree cover disappeared in that year, and the extent number shows what remains of the 2000 tree cover baseline after subtracting cumulative loss. Forest regrowth is not included in the dataset.

Annual tree cover loss in Malaysia, 2001–2024. View chart definition.
Tree cover extent in 2000 minus cumulative tree cover loss in Malaysia, 2001–2024 (loss-only residual; does not account for gain). View chart definition.

Annual tree cover extent and loss
| Year | Tree cover extent (km2) (Note: This residual measure does not include forest regrowth.) | Annual tree cover loss (km2) |
|---|---|---|
| 2001 | 291,119.62 | 3,328.06 |
| 2002 | 287,991.21 | 3,128.41 |
| 2003 | 286,150.64 | 1,840.57 |
| 2004 | 282,630.60 | 3,520.04 |
| 2005 | 278,873.02 | 3,757.58 |
| 2006 | 275,527.75 | 3,345.27 |
| 2007 | 271,470.84 | 4,056.91 |
| 2008 | 267,788.25 | 3,682.59 |
| 2009 | 261,557.33 | 6,230.92 |
| 2010 | 257,247.84 | 4,309.49 |
| 2011 | 252,616.34 | 4,631.50 |
| 2012 | 246,332.51 | 6,283.83 |
| 2013 | 242,998.89 | 3,333.62 |
| 2014 | 236,538.62 | 6,460.27 |
| 2015 | 231,993.72 | 4,544.90 |
| 2016 | 226,338.19 | 5,655.53 |
| 2017 | 221,503.20 | 4,834.99 |
| 2018 | 217,123.11 | 4,380.09 |
| 2019 | 213,169.07 | 3,954.04 |
| 2020 | 210,481.31 | 2,687.76 |
| 2021 | 207,705.33 | 2,775.98 |
| 2022 | 205,224.06 | 2,481.27 |
| 2023 | 202,137.51 | 3,086.55 |
| 2024 | 199,312.18 | 2,825.33 |

== REDD+ forest reference levels and monitoring ==
Malaysia has submitted national forest reference levels (FRLs) under the UNFCCC REDD+ framework. These benchmarks are used in the context of results-based payments, and each submission is subject to a UNFCCC technical assessment.

Malaysia’s first FRL (submitted in December 2014 and assessed in 2015) covered the REDD+ activity “sustainable management of forests” and was limited to production forests within the Permanent Reserved Forest (PRF). It included above-ground and below-ground biomass carbon pools and estimated CO2 removals from forest growth and emissions from commercial harvest. The assessed FRL was expressed as historical average net removals: –183.55 Mt CO2 per year (reference for 2006–2010) and –197.83 Mt CO2 per year (reference for 2011–2015).

In 2018 and 2019, Malaysia submitted updated national FRLs covering three REDD+ activities (reducing emissions from deforestation, sustainable management of forests, and conservation of forest carbon stocks) using annual average historical net CO2 eq removals (negative values indicating net removals rather than net emissions). The technical assessments reported assessed FRLs of –213,053,000 t CO2 eq per year for the 2000–2014 reference period (applied to a 2016–2025 results period) and –205,771,000 t CO2 eq per year for the 2005–2015 reference period (revised in the 2019 assessment).

Malaysia’s FRL submissions draw on elements commonly associated with a national forest monitoring system (NFMS), combining forest-area and change information with national forest inventory and other sector data. For example, the 2018 technical assessment describes the use of gazettement notifications and geospatial maps supported by SPOT-5 satellite imagery (10m resolution) to compile historical forest-area data, together with national forest inventory-based growth rates and statistics on timber harvest and fires; the 2019 assessment notes that the modified submission provided additional information on procedures for Malaysia’s national forest inventory. The UNFCCC REDD+ web platform lists a forest monitoring system as reported for Malaysia’s earlier (2015) submission package, while later FRL submission packages (2018 and 2019) are not marked as reporting the forest monitoring system in the platform’s documentation checklist.

== Current issues ==
The opposition in Pahang linked illegal logging to the damage caused by the 2020–2021 Malaysian floods. The state government denied this link, but ordered all logging halted during the monsoon season.

Deforestation in the following areas/ project sites have attracted controversy:

Terengganu

- Hulu Terengganu Hydroelectric Project

Pahang

- Kelau Forest Reserve

Johor

- Sungai Mas Forest
- Pulai River Mangrove Forest

Kelantan

- Gunung Stong Selatan Forest Reserve
- Loging Forest Reserve

Perak

- Teluk Rubiah
- Belum-Temenggor

Selangor

- Bukit Cherakah
- Kuala Langat
- Sungai Jelok

== See also ==
- Deforestation in Borneo
- Environment of Malaysia
- Environmental issues in Malaysia
- List of environmental issues
- Palm oil production in Malaysia
- Peninsular Malaysian rain forests, Peninsular Malaysian peat swamp forests, Peninsular Malaysian montane rain forests
