= Recycling in Malaysia =

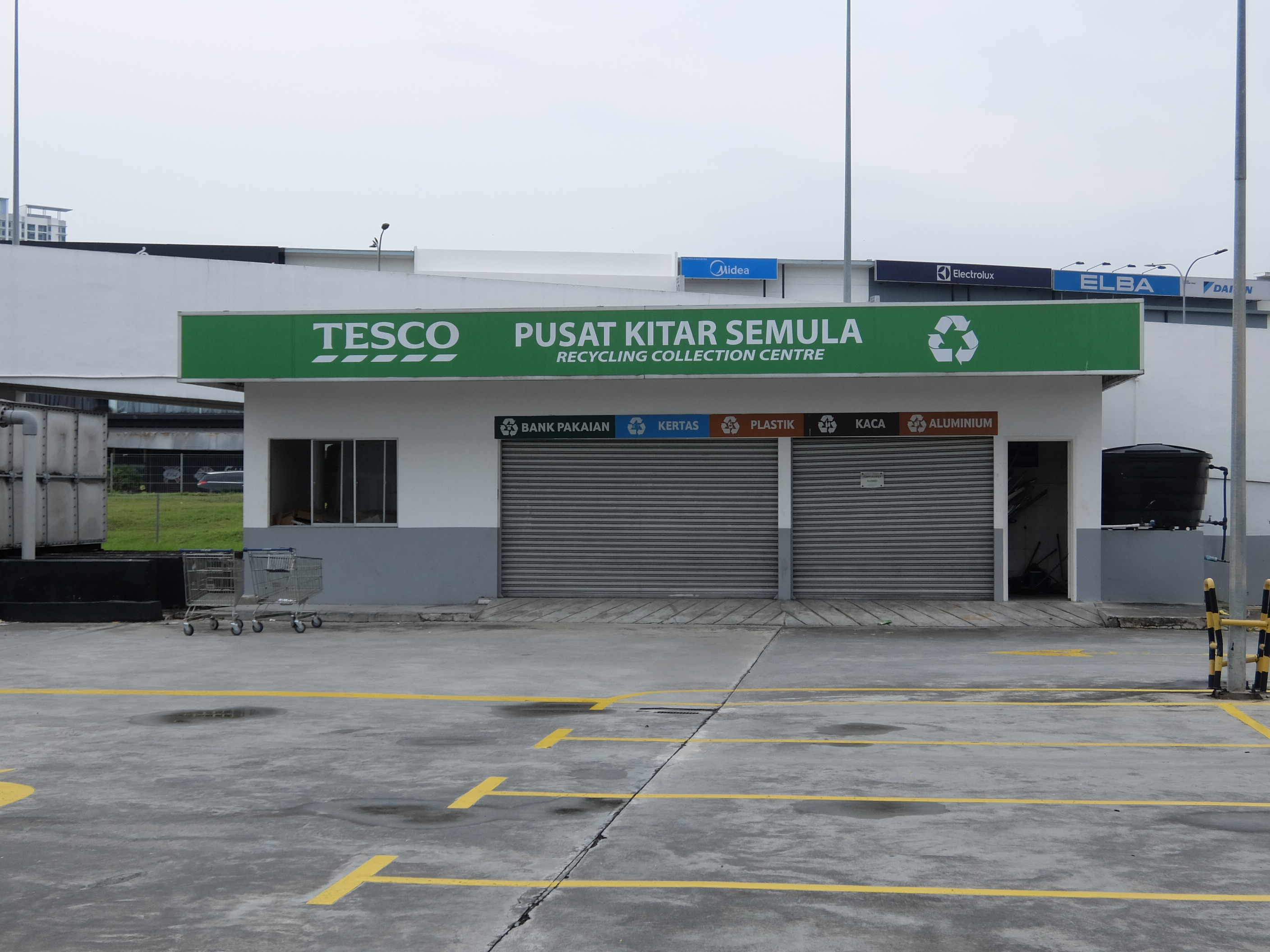
Recycling collection center in Iskandar Puteri, Johor.

Data from the Solid Waste Management and Public Cleansing Corporation (SWCorp) collected from January to November throughout 2018 puts the national recycling rate at 0.06%, or about 1,800 tonnes of the 3 million tonnes of waste collected in the period. Majority of the waste were sent to landfills.

In 2015, household, industrial, commercial and institutional waste generation in the country was at 38,563 tonne per day of which 88.8% went to landfills. In 2005, Malaysia produced about 7.34 million tonnes of solid wastes, of which 30% are possibly recyclable but only 3-5% were actually processed. Given the insufficiency in recyclables within the country and the potential lucrative profits, Malaysian companies have been importing rubbish from foreign countries, more so since the total plastic waste ban of China in 2018.

Household recycling rate in Malaysia is estimated to be at 9.7% in a nationwide survey in 2011. The same report indicated that Kuantan had the highest household recycling rate (18.4%) while Sabah rest at the lowest with 4.5%. Kuala Lumpur, the nation's capital with an estimated population of 1.66 million people in 2009, produced household waste of around 0.8 to 1.3 kg per day, that amount together with the industrial waste of the city led to the generation of an average 3,500 tonnes of waste per day. In 2012, its household recycling rate was at 10.4%.

In the Eleventh Malaysia Plan 2016- 2020, the stated solid waste management goals was to achieve a rate of 40% waste diversion from landfill and 22% recycling rate by 2020.

== Legislation and regulations ==
A summary of the policies and laws affecting waste management and recycling in Malaysia
Legislation and regulation	Year	Agency
Street, Drainage and Building Act 1974, Environmental Quality Act 1974 Local Government Act 1976	1970s	Local authorities
Action Plan for a Beautiful and Clean Malaysia (ABC Plan)	1988	Local authorities
Vision 2020	1991	Local authorities
First National Recycling Day	1993	Local authorities
Second National Recycling Day	2000	Federalisation and Privatisation
National Strategic Plan (NSP)	2005	Federalisation and Privatisation
Waste Minimization Master Plan (WM-MP)	2006	Federalisation and Privatisation
Solid Waste and Public Cleansing Corporation Act 2007 (Act 672)	2007	Federalisation and Privatisation
Solid Waste and Public Cleansing Corporation Act 2007 (Act 672)	2007	Federalisation and Privatisation
Solid Waste and Public Cleansing Corporation Act 2007 (Act 673)	2011	Federalisation and Privatisation
SWCorp Strategic Plan	2014	Federalisation and Privatisation
Comprehensive Action Plan of Solid Waste Management 2015–2020	2015	Federalisation and Privatisation
Separation at Source Initiative (SSI)	2016	Federalisation and Privatisation

== Malaysian plastic recycling crisis ==
In January 2018, China launched the National Sword policy, banning plastic waste imports. Since then, imports of plastic waste into Malaysia has surged. According to a Greenpeace report "Malaysia imported 195,444.46 metric tonnes of plastic waste from the United States (US) from January to July 2018 alone, in comparison to a total of 97,544 metric tonnes for January to November 2017". The report warned that there were regulation violations in the disposal of imported plastic waste to the country (plastic is burned on roadsides in the open-air, dumped in unregulated or poorly regulated dump sites close to bodies of water, discarded in abandoned buildings or just left to degrade and rot in the open) thus contributing to environmental pollution and harmful health impact for Malaysians. These wastes come primarily from developed countries, with the US, Japan, United Kingdom, being the top 3, and Australia, New Zealand, Finland, France, Belgium, Germany, Spain, Sweden and Switzerland as the rest. In 2023, The United States maintained its top position of most plastic waste exported to Malaysia, with the problem of 'Waste Colonialism' still ongoing.

In October 2018, the Energy, Science, Technology, Environment and Climate Change Minister Yeo Bee Yin announced that the country would imposed a limit and eventual ban on the import of all non-recyclable solid waste, particularly plastic and that up to 30 illegal factories have been closed. Many of these illegal factories were situated in Jenjarom, Kuala Langat, Selangor leaving a waste of over 17,000 tonnes. When they were in operation, the smoke from the burning and processing of plastic waste affected the health of the local community. An April 2019 news report quoted the same minister where she stated that the number of closed plastic waste factories have increased to 148 factories and highlighted the serious problem of 111 containers filled with contaminated plastic unfit for recycling were left unclaimed at Westports in Port Klang after being smuggled in by global syndicates using false declarations and exploiting a broken international trade system.

Acerbating the external contribution to plastic waste in Malaysia, in a study commissioned by WWF, Malaysia was found to have the highest annual per capita plastic use, at 16.78 kg per person compared to China, Indonesia, Philippines, Thailand and Vietnam. As such, plastic pollution has continued to worsen, as evidenced by the fact that the country has entering the top 10 spots in terms the most mismanagement most plastic waste polluting the ocean per capita per year.

== Recycling related movements and events in Malaysia ==
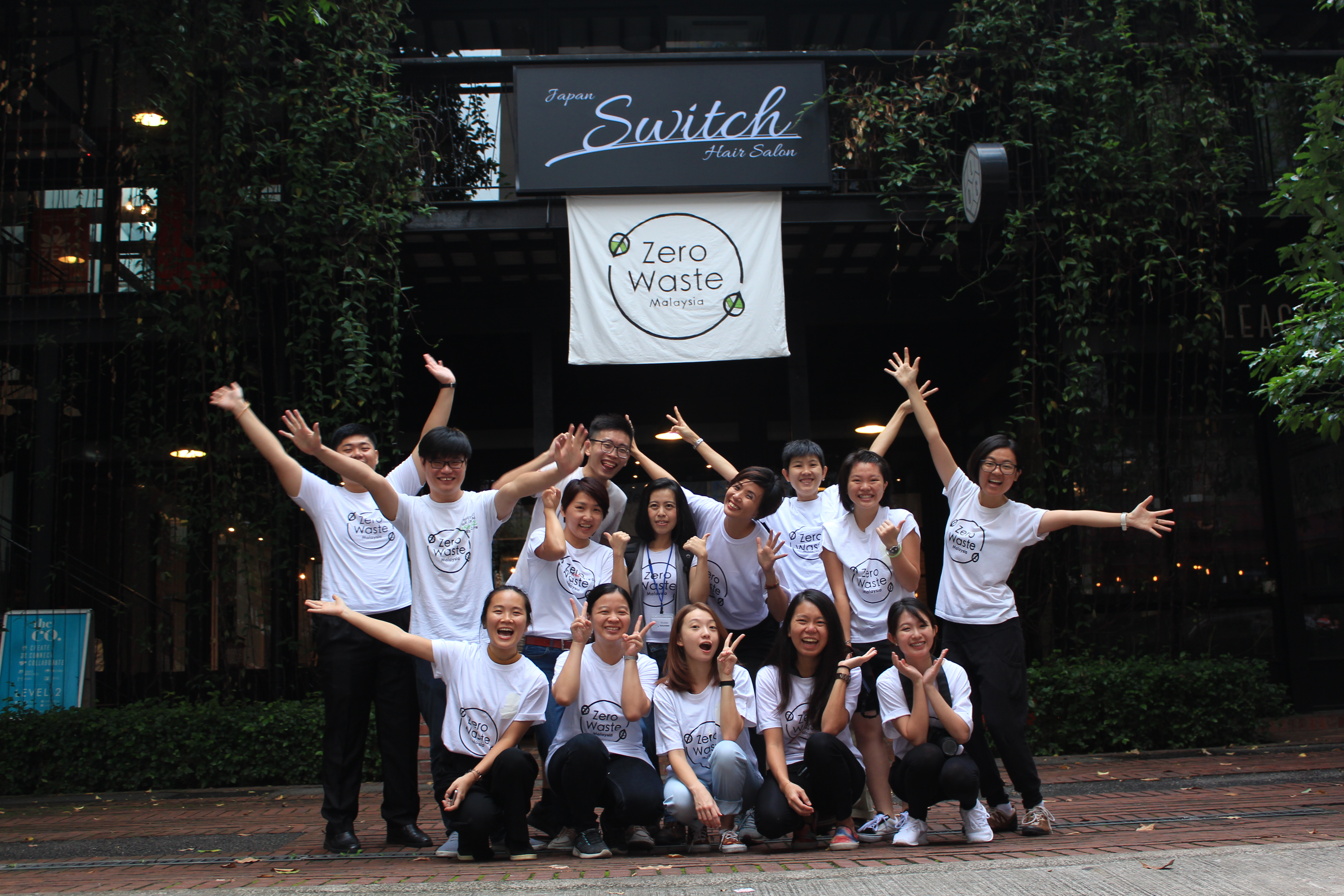
Volunteers of Zero Waste Malaysia (@ZWM@)

The Malaysian branch of Buddhist Tzu Chi Charity Foundation which originated from Taiwan has made recycling one of its main charitable activities since its establishment in 1996. To date, Tzu Chi volunteers run and manage over 160 recycling centers and over 900 pick up points across Malaysia. The success of Tzu Chi's Malaysian efforts has led to Christian parishes being encouraged to hold their own recycling programmes.

The Zero Waste movement officially arrived in Malaysia in the environs of 2016 when Zero Waste Malaysia (“ZWM”) was registered as a non-profit organisation (PPM-044-10-29032018) under The Registry of Societies of Malaysia. The organisation does not collect recyclable waste but is focused on the promotion of sustainable living in Malaysia through educational resources, corporate engagement and on-ground projects/initiatives. The organisation may be contacted via their official website where a map for locating recycling centers in Malaysia is available. Private run stores that follow the Zero Waste principles where customers can refill household cleaners and cosmetics or buy reusable and recycle friendly products have also emerged in Klang Valley.

In collaboration with Coca-Cola Malaysia, AEON Malaysia, and Trash4Cash, Hiroyuki Industries launched the 'Recycle Me!' campaign in December 2023. The initiative encourages the public to deposit PET bottles in smart recycle bins located at selected AEON Malls across several states, offering cash rewards and Coca-Cola products in exchange.

== See also ==
- Environment of Malaysia
- Environmental issues in Malaysia
