= Conservation in Malaysia =

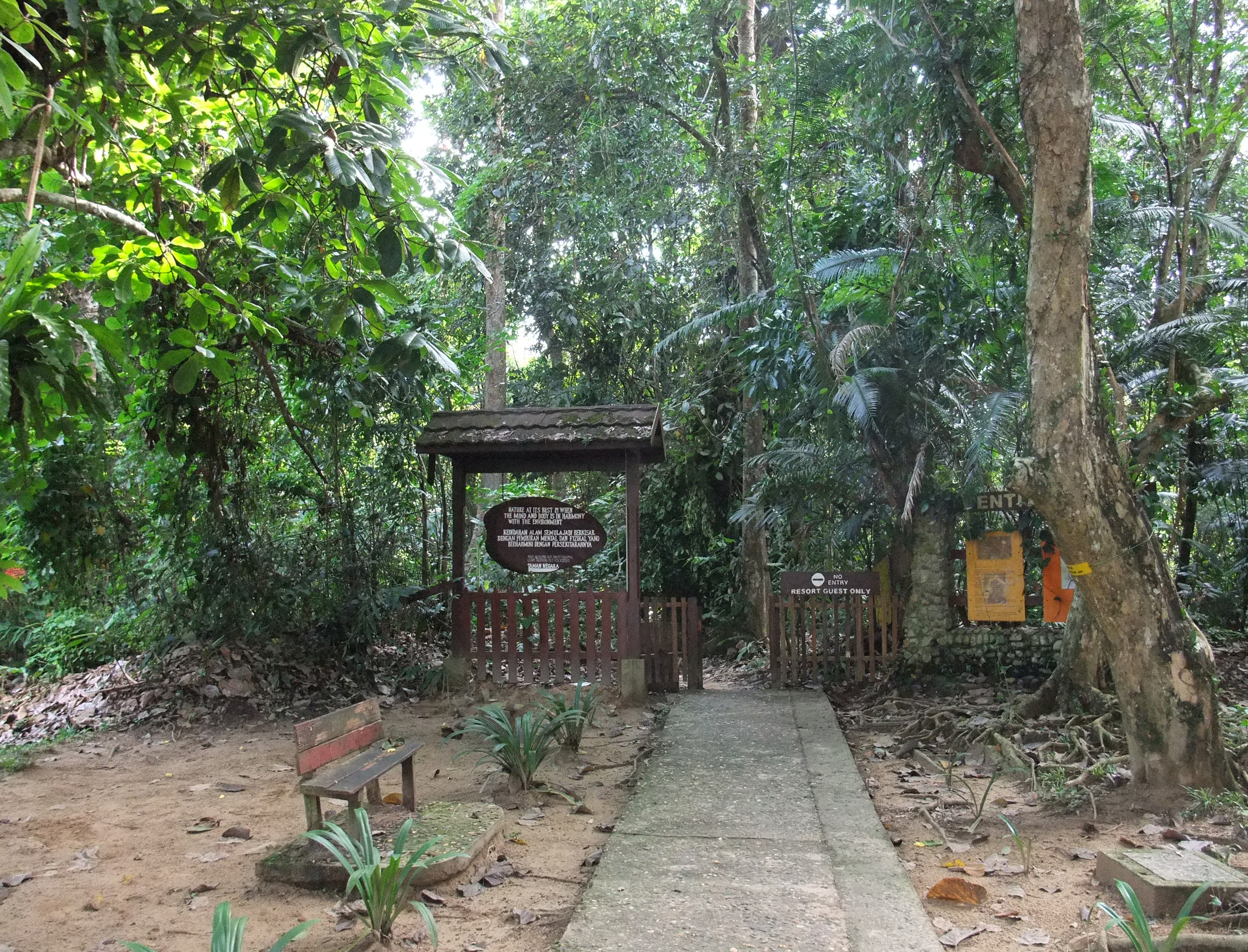
Entrance to Taman Negara, Malaysia's largest national park.

Conservation in Malaysia is an issue of national importance. As a megadiverse country, Malaysia is rich in wildlife, endemic species and unique habitats. Wildlife protection began in some form as early as the 1880s, before the formation of Malaysia. The country ratified the Convention on Biological Diversity in 1994 and by 2019 had joined 17 multilateral environmental agreements related to biodiversity. Despite having numerous national parks and protected areas, and implementing conservation policies and legislation, forest loss and other environmental issues present major challenges for biodiversity conservation.

Another challenge is the inclusion of indigenous peoples in conservation efforts. While some states (like Sabah) have non-governmental organizations that work to include indigenous people, a 2020 report found that " ...there seems to be little work and progress in increasing the involvement of indigenous peoples and local communities in conservation efforts at the local level."

Conservation is overseen by the Department of Wildlife and National Parks in Peninsular Malaysia. Marine protected areas in Malaysia are managed by the Department of Fisheries under the Fisheries Act of 1989. As of 2022, Malaysia has gazetted 53 marine protected areas.

== See also ==
- List of national parks in Malaysia
- Malaysian Wildlife Law
- Malaysian Green Transition
