= Poverty in Malaysia =

Poverty in Malaysia is a controversial economic issue. The definition of poverty and the poverty line for Malaysians has been disputed, and government policies to address poverty such as the Malaysian New Economic Policy have been met with political protest.

Malaysia's total population is 31 million as of 2015, of which 0.6% live below the national poverty line. Malaysia has grown rapidly in terms of economic development. An indicator is that in 2014, 65.6% of the population aged 15 years and above were employed.

== History ==
After Malaysian independence, significant chunks of the Malaysian economy were controlled by British colonial firms. Second economically to these monopolies were small-scale retail enterprises run by the Malaysian Chinese and small-scale moneylending businesses run by a few Malaysian Indians.

After the 13 May Incident in 1969, where racial rioting broke out in the federal capital of Kuala Lumpur, the Malaysian New Economic Policy (NEP) was initiated. Its purpose was to narrow the disparities in wealth between the Malay and non-Malay communities in the country through aggressive affirmative action and state intervention in the economy.

It has been suggested that although the NEP was initially successful in achieving its goal of reducing the economic gap between different communities in the country, its politicisation in the 1990s and 2000s (decade) hampered its implementation; during this period, intraethnic economic inequity amongst the Malays reportedly increased. Anecdotal evidence has been used to suggest that rural Malay communities have not been significantly uplifted economically by the NEP.

As the country modernised, new forms of poverty appeared; one such problem was that of urban poverty. Economic development has been named as the cause of poverty amongst "single female headed households, the rural elderly, unskilled workers and migrant workers" by a local economist.

The United Nations Development Programme has praised Malaysia for its reportedly successful poverty reduction programmes. Officially:

In 2002, it was 5.1 percent down from 7.5 percent in 1999. The number of poor households declined by 25.6 percent to 267,900. If the number of the handicapped, disabled and elderly who received welfare support from the government is excluded, the incidence of poverty in 2002 is estimated at 4.5 percent.

However, in 2019, UN disputed the poverty figures released by Malaysia. Malaysia stated that its poverty figures was down to 0.4% in 2016 when compared to 49% in 1970. This is because Malaysia defined poverty as household income per month less than RM 980. However, UN officials argued that Malaysia has set the poverty line too low and household income more than RM 980 but less than RM 2000 are in fact under the poverty category also. The UN also stated that realistic poverty rate in Malaysia is from 16% to 20%. However, Malaysia stand firm of its claim while pointing that the UN assertions are incorrect.

By 2022, Malaysia government has revised the absolute poverty rate to 6.2% based on the monthly household PLI of RM 2589.

== See also ==
- Income disparity in Malaysia
- List of Malaysian states by household income
- Poverty by country
