= 2017 Malaysian floods =

2017 flooding in northwestern Malaysia

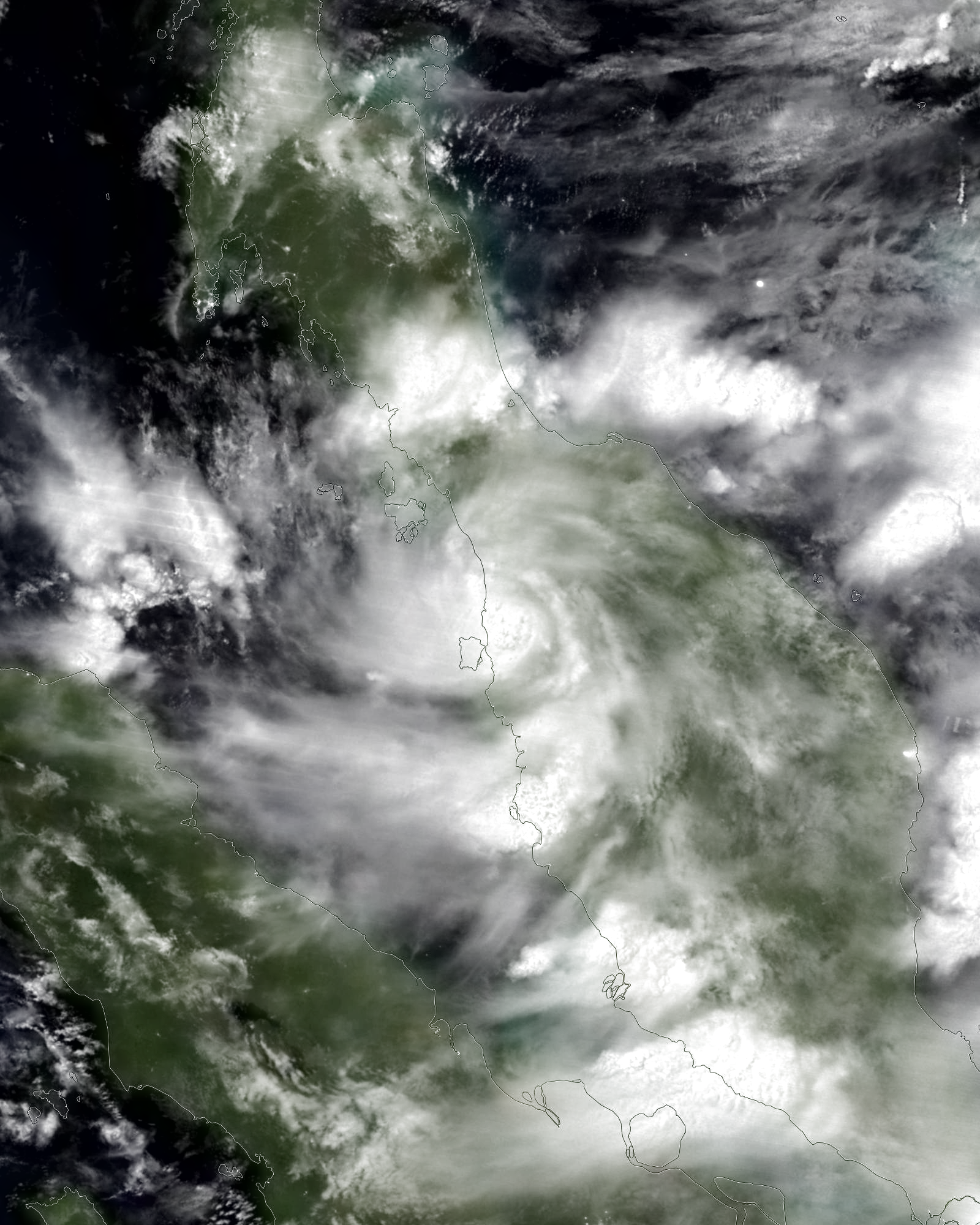
- Tropical Depression 29W over northwestern Malaysia on 4 November
- Date: 2–5 November 2017
- Location: Malaysia (Kedah, Penang and Perak)
- Deaths: 7
- Property damage: RM328 million (US$76.3 million)

The 2017 Malaysian floods impacted northwestern Malaysia in November 2017, primarily affecting the states of Kedah, Penang and Perak. The flooding resulted from a tropical depression that developed in the South China Sea, which made landfall in southern Thailand on 3 November and subsequently entered northern Malaysia on the next day. Penang was the most severely impacted state; seven people were killed and over 7,000 individuals displaced. Local media described the flooding as the worst in Penang's history. Across Malaysia, the floods were estimated to have caused approximately US$76.3 million (Note: All currencies are in their 2017 values and are converted to United States dollars using data from the International Monetary Fund published by the World Bank.) in damages.

== Background ==
Parts of Malaysia experience annual flooding during the northeast monsoon, which occurs between November and March. Flood occurrences are not uniform across the country; the east coast of Peninsular Malaysia frequently endures extensive flooding during this season, while the west coast is more prone to localised flooding during the inter-monsoon period from September to November.

Between 14 and 15 September 2017, northwestern Malaysia experienced flash floods attributed to the effects of Typhoon Doksuri. The states of Penang, Kedah and Perlis were particularly impacted. On 15 September, the Ayer Itam Dam recorded 270 mm (11 in) of rainfall, the highest in Penang for that day. Floodwaters reached depths of 0.1–0.6 m (0.33–1.97 ft) at downtown George Town, while Seberang Perai also experienced significant inundation. At the time, the event was regarded as the worst flooding in Penang since 2007.

== Weather system ==
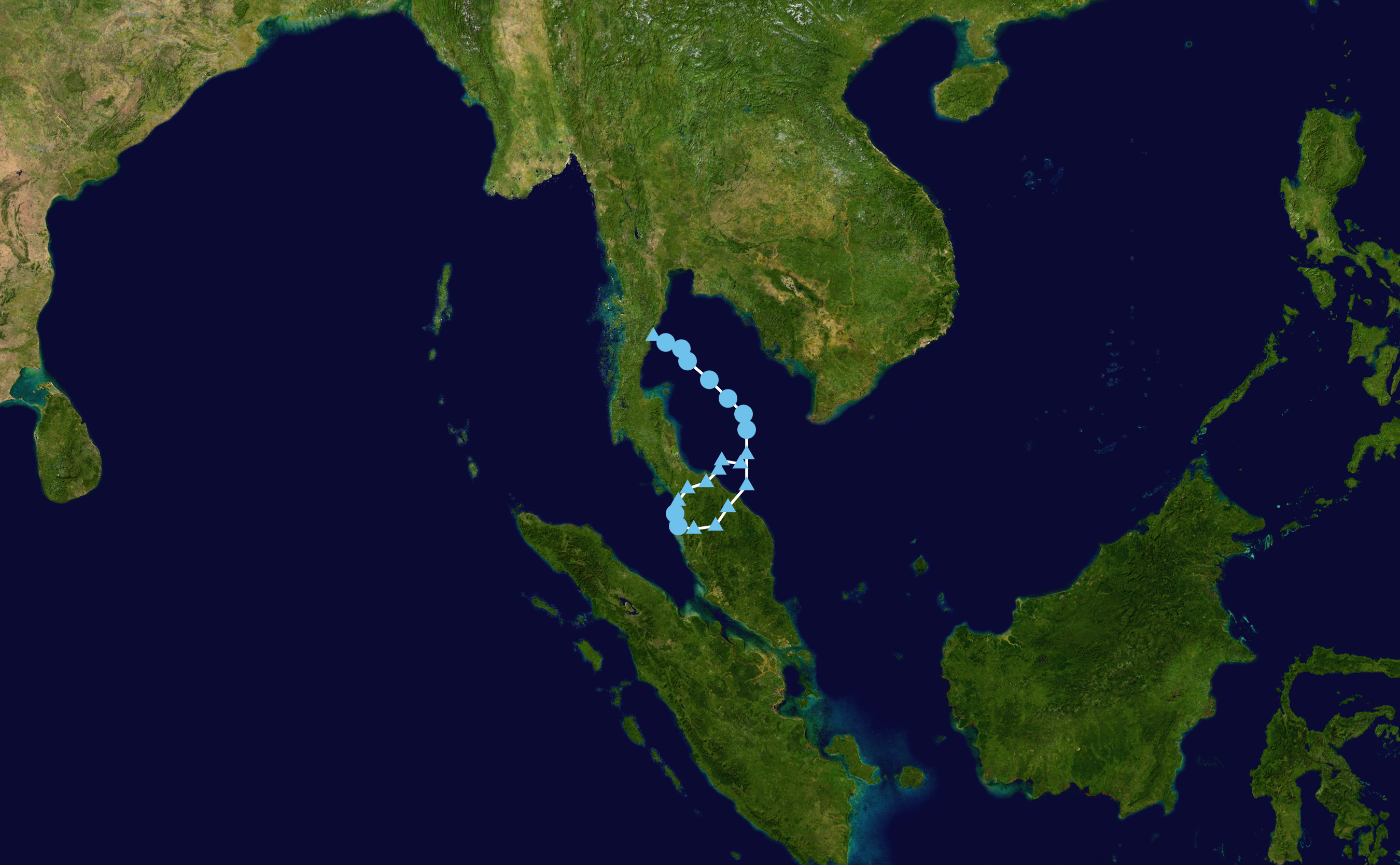
Map plotting the storm's track and intensity, according to the Saffir–Simpson scale Map key Saffir–Simpson scale Tropical depression (≤38 mph, ≤62 km/h) Tropical storm (39–73 mph, 63–118 km/h) Category 1 (74–95 mph, 119–153 km/h) Category 2 (96–110 mph, 154–177 km/h) Category 3 (111–129 mph, 178–208 km/h) Category 4 (130–156 mph, 209–251 km/h) Category 5 (≥157 mph, ≥252 km/h) Unknown Storm type Tropical cyclone Subtropical cyclone Extratropical cyclone, remnant low, tropical disturbance, or monsoon depression

On 30 October, the Japan Meteorological Agency (JMA) noted a tropical depression formed over the southern South China Sea. Early on 31 October, the Joint Typhoon Warning Center (JTWC) issued a Tropical Cyclone Formation Alert (TCFA) for the system, but was cancelled later that day as the system remained disorganised while moving westward, due to wind shear from the outflow from Typhoon Damrey. The system kept on moving slowly to the west for days, without much development due to the continuous effects of wind shear. It made landfall in Pattani province of Thailand on 3 November, and the JMA downgraded it to a low-pressure area later that day. The remnants an anti-clockwise loop over the Malay Peninsula. While still over northern Malaysia, the JTWC issued a TCFA again on 5 November, and was expected to re-develop over the Gulf of Thailand. It emerged back to waters later that day. The JTWC upgraded it to a tropical depression and assigned it as 29W. The JMA re-classified it as a tropical depression later that day. It turned northwestward under the influence of a low- to mid-level ridge to its northeast. Despite favourable condition including warm sea surface temperatures of 30 °C (86 °F), low wind shear and good poleward outflow, land interaction prohibited further strengthening. The JMA ceased monitoring the system later that day. Early on 8 November, 29W made the second landfall in southern Prachuap Khiri Khan province of Thailand, and dissipated shortly afterwards.

== Impact ==
Heavy rains as a result of the tailwinds from 29W lashed northwestern Malaysia between 2 and 5 November. On 1 November, the Malaysian Meteorological Department (MET Malaysia) had issued a "Yellow Alert", indicating a third-level warning for heavy rainfall, for the states of Kedah, Kelantan, Penang, Perak, Perlis and Terengganu. Due to persistent rainfall, the alert level was escalated to "Orange" for Perlis, Kedah and Penang on November 4, and subsequently raised to "Red", the highest warning level, for Kedah and Penang. As the rainfall subsided, the alert levels were gradually decreased. The then-Chief Minister of Penang Lim Guan Eng suggested that the remnants of Typhoon Damrey contributed to the intense rainfall; however, this claim was denied by MET Malaysia.

=== Kedah ===
Between 3 November and 5 November, heavy rains caused flooding in the southernmost districts of Baling, Bandar Baharu, Kuala Muda, Kulim and Yan. A section of the North–South Expressway near Sungai Petani became inaccessible due to the floods, while an uprooted tree obstructed a road in Yan. By 7:00 a.m. on 6 November, 3,402 individuals had been evacuated in the five districts.

In spite of the floods, the Sijil Pelajaran Malaysia (SPM) and Sijil Tinggi Persekolahan Malaysia (STPM) examinations proceeded as planned. The agricultural damage resulting from the flooding was estimated at RM6.42 million (US$1.5 million).

=== Penang ===
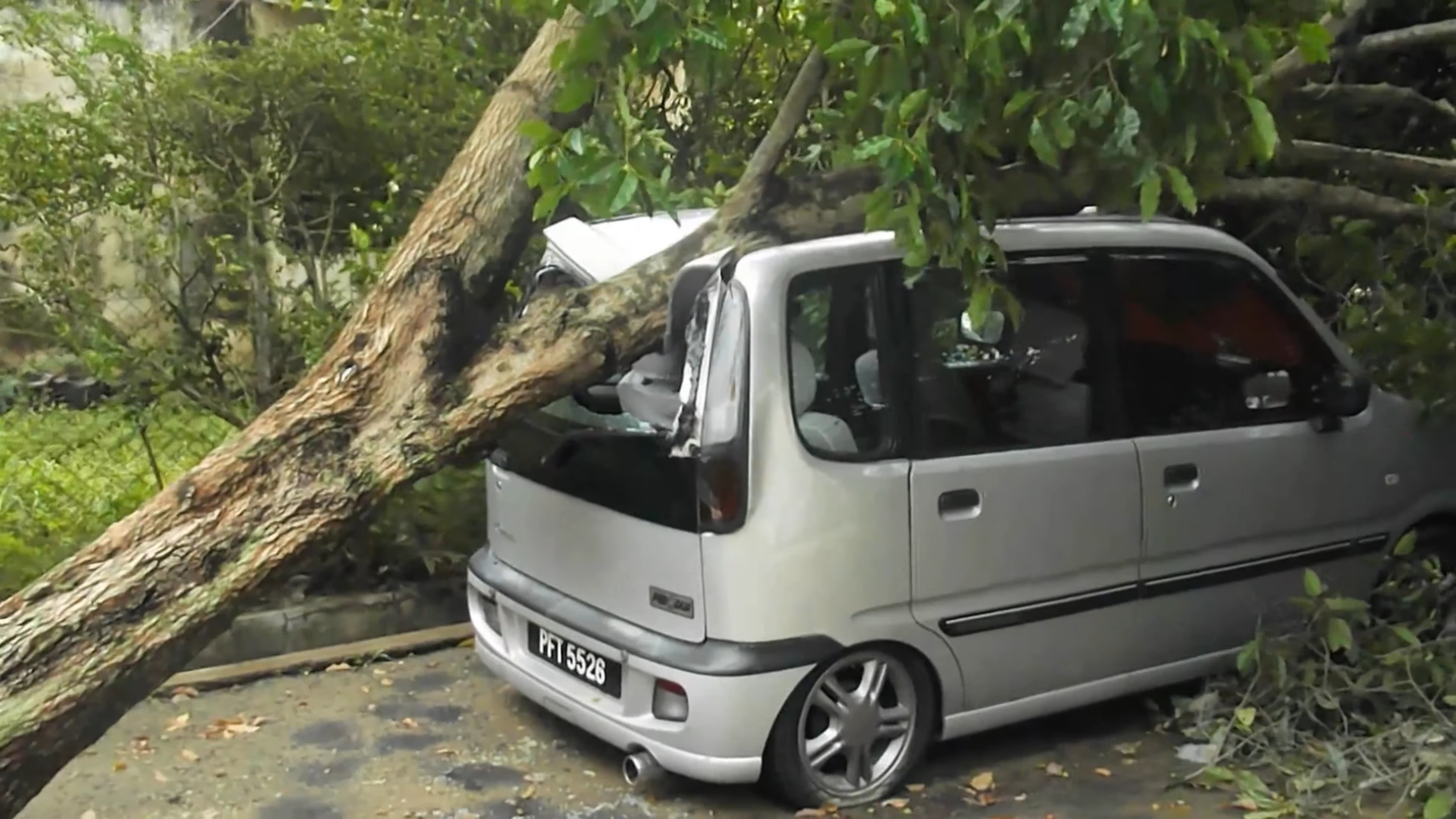
Aftermath of the floods at downtown George Town

Heavy rains lashed the state from 2:00 p.m. on 4 November to the morning of 5 November. On the evening of 4 November, the Ayer Itam Dam recorded 315 mm (12.4 in) of rain over a 24-hour period, the highest in Penang up to that point. The adverse weather conditions resulted in a ferry washing ashore at Butterworth. In George Town, large swathes of the city centre became inundated, with water levels rising to between 10 and 12 ft (3.0 and 3.7 m), and trees were uprooted throughout the city. A sinkhole caused the collapse of a road near a residential development at Tanjong Bungah. Flights at the Penang International Airport were either cancelled or diverted due to the severe weather. Other transportation systems such as the Penang Hill Railway and Rapid Penang, the state's primary public bus operator, were also suspended.

By 3:30 a.m. on 5 November, it was estimated that 80% of Penang was hit by continuous rainfall, with several locations described as almost "paralysed". In response, Chief Minister Lim contacted Deputy Prime Minister Ahmad Zahid Hamidi to request federal assistance. One hour later, the Malaysian Armed Forces were deployed, establishing an operations centre to coordinate rescue efforts. By 8:30 a.m., military and police personnel commenced evacuation operations within the state. On the same day, Butterworth recorded 372 mm (14.6 in) of rainfall, equivalent to 1.5 months of rainfall and surpassing the previous day's record at the Ayer Itam Dam.

By the end of 5 November, rainfall had diminished, but about 3,000 people were forced to temporarily evacuate to relief centres statewide. Five fatalities were reported on the same day; four individuals drowned in their houses and a Bangladeshi worker was killed by an uprooted tree. By the morning of 6 November, the number of evacuees in Penang had increased to 5,845. Two more bodies were also discovered, raising the total death toll to seven. The total number of evacuees reached 7,294 by noon on 7 November. Despite the flooding, SPM examinations proceeded as scheduled, with over 20,000 students navigating floodwaters to participate in the exams.

The Penang Island City Council began cleanup operations after floodwaters subsided in George Town on 5 November. However, mainland Seberang Perai remained inundated until 6 November, when the waters began to recede. Local news outlets such as The Edge and Bernama described the flooding as the worst in Penang's history. Penang's manufacturing sector estimated losses of approximately RM300 million (US$69.8 million), while the agricultural sector faced losses amounting to RM21.3 million (US$4.95 million).

=== Perak ===
Three districts in Perak – Hulu Perak, Kuala Kangsar and Perak Tengah – were hit by floods, displacing a total of 174 people by 8:30 a.m. on 6 November. In Hulu Perak, a landslide occurred near Lenggong, but no casualties were reported.

== Responses ==
=== Domestic ===
- Federal government: In response to flooding in Penang, the Civil Defence Force redeployed personnel to assist with evacuation operations alongside military and police units. On 7 November, Prime Minister Najib Razak visited flood-hit areas in Penang and announced that the federal government was considering an additional RM1 billion in funding for flood mitigation infrastructure in the state. Prior to this announcement, flood mitigation projects worth RM150 million had already been approved. The federal government also provided cash aid of RM250 to each household impacted by the flooding.
- Penang: The Penang state government allocated a one-time cash aid of RM700 to flood victims as part of the "Penang Bangkit" programme, which had a total cost of RM105 million. The programme included cleanup efforts, aid delivery, discounts on assessment fees and water charges, and the replacement of lost government documents.
- Perak: The Perak state government allocated RM100,000 for the procurement of equipment and supplies to be dispatched to Penang. A supplementary allocation of RM1 million was also approved in anticipation of floods within Perak.
- Selangor: The Selangor state government dispatched 300 volunteers to Penang and donated a total of RM1 million to the Penang state government for flood relief efforts.
- The ruling coalition in Penang, Pakatan Harapan (PH), mobilised party machinery to support flood victims. The Democratic Action Party (DAP) organised a donation drive between 6 November and 15 November to aid those affected by the floods in the state. Party volunteers from Perak participated in aid delivery efforts in Penang. Additionally, both Amanah and Parti Keadilan Rakyat (PKR) mobilised volunteers to assist in evacuation operations.
- Barisan Nasional (BN), the then ruling federal coalition and the opposition in Penang, formed committees to assess flood mitigation efforts in PH-run Penang. Gerakan raised RM100,000 to support flood victims. The Malaysian Chinese Association (MCA) and Malaysian Indian Congress (MIC) dispatched volunteers to assist in flood relief efforts. On the other hand, Padang Besar Member of Parliament (MP) Zahidi Zainul Abidin from the United Malays National Organisation (UMNO) suggested that the floods in Penang were "karmic retribution" for hosting Oktoberfest, while Deputy Prime Minister Ahmad Zahid Hamidi called the disaster "a sign from God" for BN to retake the Penang state government.
- The Malaysian Islamic Party (PAS) mobilised its members to assist in evacuation operations and flood relief efforts in Penang. The party's deputy president Tuan Ibrahim Tuan Man also extended condolences to the Penang state government. This was in spite of the existing political tensions between PAS and the PH administration in Penang, as PAS previously alleged that corruption had contributed to the September floods in the state.

=== International ===
- Singapore: On 23 November, the Singapore Red Cross initiated a month-long fundraising campaign to support communities impacted by Typhoon Damrey in Vietnam and the flooding in Penang. A total of S$20,000 was raised to assist flood victims in Penang.
- Taiwan: On 22 November, representative of the Taipei Economic and Cultural Office in Malaysia James Chang Chi-ping presided over a donation presentation ceremony alongside Penang's Chief Minister Lim Guan Eng. The Taipei Investors' Association in Malaysia committed a total of RM151,200 for flood victims in Penang.

=== Non-governmental organisations ===
- AirAsia facilitated air transport for supplies and medical personnel following the floods.
- American International Group disbursed interim payments totaling nearly RM300,000 to customers affected by the floods in Penang and Kedah.
- Honda offered discounts of up to 50% on repairs for Honda models affected by the flooding.
- IJM Corporation contributed volunteers, machinery and lorries to aid in cleanup operations in George Town.
- Johor Darul Ta'zim F.C. donated RM500,000 to the Penang state government.
- Mah Sing Foundation allocated RM500,000 to assist flood victims.
- Mitsui Sumitomo Insurance Group announced the distribution of RM2.2 million for insurance claims and pledged to expedite the processing of claims.
- OBike initiated a donation drive, pledging RM2,000 daily for every 10,000 rides completed.
- Oppo committed a portion of their profits from a roadshow at Sunway Carnival Mall to support flood relief efforts in Penang.
- Perodua provided free inspections for Perodua models damaged by the floods and offered 20% discounts on selected spare parts.
- Samsung announced the provision of free repair services for appliances and devices affected by the flooding.
- Sime Darby delivered food, hygiene supplies, appliances and vouchers to assist flood victims in Penang and Kedah.
- 300 volunteers from the University of Kuala Lumpur distributed RM60,000 worth of food, essentials and medical supplies for flood victims.
- ViTrox dispatched volunteers to assist with flood relief efforts.

== Criticism of the government ==
=== Inadequate weather warning ===
Flood victims in Penang reported being unprepared for the swift onset of flooding, asserting that the warnings from MET Malaysia were inadequate. The Penang branch of the Federation of Malaysian Manufacturers (FMM), which represents the manufacturing sector in Malaysia, also claimed that MET Malaysia issued warnings about heavy rainfall after the rainfall had already begun. Frustrations over the allegedly late weather warnings from MET Malaysia prompted Penang's Chief Minister Lim Guan Eng to propose the creation of a separate state-run weather agency.

MET Malaysia countered that heavy rain alerts were issued as early as 1 November and had been broadcast on television. The severe flooding was attributed to exceptionally high rainfall and elevated tide levels, while some residents observed that clogged drainage systems significantly exacerbated the flooding.

=== Feuding between Penang and federal governments ===
At the time of the disaster, Penang was governed by the opposition coalition Pakatan Rakyat (PR) and its successor Pakatan Harapan (PH) since 2008, while Barisan Nasional (BN) held power at the federal level. Political tensions between the federal government and the Penang state government led to the withholding of federal funds for the state's infrastructure. While Penang's Chief Minister Lim Guan Eng advocated for enhanced coordination between the federal and state governments in disaster management, he also pushed for an increase in federal funding for the state's flood mitigation infrastructure. Federal funds were not forthcoming for 2018, forcing the Penang government to allocate another RM150 million for flood mitigation initiatives in 2017.

In response, federal Minister of Natural Resources Wan Junaidi Tuanku Jaafar asserted that RM1.04 billion had been spent by the federal government on flood mitigation projects in Penang since 2006, out of the initial RM2.57 billion allocation, and that not all of the initial allocation would be utilised exclusively for construction works. Lim nonetheless continued pursuing an increase in funding for flood mitigation in 2018. The floods in 2017 became a significant issue during the 2018 state election, although PH eventually retained power with a larger majority. Tensions between the federal and Penang governments also escalated due to claims of delays in aid disbursement and inequities in federal cash assistance for Penang. Households in other states affected by floods received RM500 in cash aid from the federal government, while those in Penang only received RM250.

Following the 2018 general election, which saw PH replace BN in the federal government, federal allocations totaling RM200 million were approved for flood mitigation infrastructure in Penang. However, spats between Lim and Ahmad Zahid Hamidi, who later became president of the United Malays National Organisation (UMNO), persisted in the years following the floods. In 2024, Zahid referenced a phone call made by Lim during the flooding, urging Lim not to accuse UMNO ministers of neglecting to assist Penang during that period. Lim responded by suggesting that Zahid had exploited the natural disaster for political mileage.

== See also ==
- Floods in Malaysia
- 2021–2022 Malaysian floods
