= Floods in Malaysia =

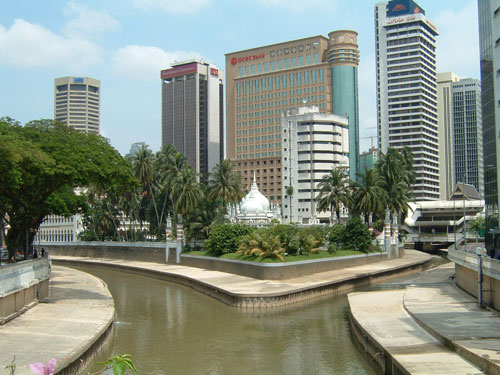
Gombak river merges with the Klang river. Heavy development has narrowed certain stretches of the river: this contributes to flash floods in Kuala Lumpur, especially after heavy rain.

Floods in Malaysia are one of the most regular natural disasters affecting the country, which occurs nearly every year especially during the monsoon season. The coasts of peninsular Malaysia are the most prone to flooding especially during the northeast monsoon season from October to March.

== Notable floods ==
- 10 December 1969 – Kluang flood.
- January 1971 – Kuala Lumpur hit by flash floods.
- 2 March 2006 – Shah Alam hit by flash floods.
- 19 December 2006 – Several parts of Johor state including Muar, Johor Bahru, Skudai and Segamat were hit by flash floods.
- 10 January 2007 – Several parts of Johor were hit by flash floods again.
- 10 June 2007 – Kuala Lumpur was hit by flash floods, worst since 10 June 2003.
- December 2007 – Several parts of the East Coast of the Peninsula including Kelantan, Terengganu, Pahang and Johor were hit by flash floods.
- November 2010 – Kedah and Perlis flooded due to heavy rainfall after a tropical depression.
- December 2014 – Northern and East Coast states of Kelantan, Terengganu, Pahang, Perak and Perlis in Peninsular Malaysia were hit by flash floods as well as some areas in Sabah.
- 14 September 2017 – Penang recorded a rainfall of 270mm and was affected by flash floods. The flooding was considered the worst in the state since 2007.
- 2017 Malaysian floods – The Northern states of Peninsular Malaysia were hit by flash floods caused by unusually heavy rains in Tropical Depression 29W, Typhoon Damrey. Flood waters in parts of Penang reached 3.7 m (12 ft), submerging entire homes.
- 2020–2021 Malaysian floods – In late 2020 and early 2021, Terengganu, Pahang and Johor were more particularly affected by flash floods.
- 2021–2022 Malaysian floods – In late 2021 and early 2022, Klang Valley (Port Klang, Klang, Setia Alam, Puncak Alam, Kota Kemuning, Shah Alam, Kuala Lumpur, Ampang, Cheras, Hulu Langat, Puchong, Dengkil) was hit by the worst flash floods ever seen in 50 years due to Tropical Depression 29W. Other reports include Lubok Cina, Kuantan, Bentong, Gua Musang, Kuala Linggi, Seremban and Teluk Intan experienced the flash flood as well.
- 2025 East Malaysia floods – A severe flood and landslide hits Sabah on September 12, 2025. This incident caused over 400 people were displaced, with more than 22 villages affected, mostly in Penampang and Beaufort. The flood resulted from heavy rainfall that affecting seven districts in Sabah. Meanwhile in Sarawak, Long Lama town has been inundated by floods following continuous downpours in Ulu Baram and its surrounding areas, leaving most parts of the town underwater.
- 2026 Malacca floods – On between July 8, 2026 and July 11, flash floods hit several parts of Malacca after a heavy downpour. The floods affected 330 people from 93 families, and the numbers kept rising in several parts of Malacca.

== Causes ==
- Given Malaysia's geographical location, most floods that occur are a natural result of cyclical monsoons during the local tropical wet season that are characterised by heavy and regular rainfall from roughly October to March.
- Inadequate drainage in many urban areas also enhance the effects of heavy rain, though efforts are underway to resolve this.
- Climate change in Malaysia is expected to impact flooding in the country, with the frequency of extreme weather increasing.

== List of hotspot flash flood areas in Malaysia ==
=== Klang Valley and Selangor ===
- Along Klang River in Klang Valley
  - Kuala Lumpur city centre near Masjid Jamek
  - Dang Wangi, Kuala Lumpur
- Along Gombak River in Klang Valley
- Along Kerayong River in Kuala Lumpur
  - Sungai Besi near Razak Mansion
- Along Damansara River in Shah Alam
  - From Taman TTDI Jaya, Giant Hypermarket, Shah Alam Stadium until Batu Tiga.
- Along Langat River in three districts
  - Kuala Langat, Sepang and Hulu Langat.

=== Perak ===
- Along Kuala Kangsar highway

=== Penang ===
- Seberang Jaya Interchange underpass on Butterworth-Kulim Expressway near Aeon Big Seberang Jaya

=== Kedah ===
- Along Muda River
- Kepala Batas near Sultan Abdul Halim Airport, Alor Star

=== Kelantan ===
- Along Kelantan River in Kelantan
  - Tambatan Diraja, Kuala Krai
  - Tangga Krai, Kuala Krai
- Golok River, Tumpat

=== Terengganu ===
- Dungun River
- Terengganu River near Kuala Berang
- Besut River

=== Pahang ===
- Pahang River from Temerloh to Pekan town
- Kuantan River in Kuantan

=== Negeri Sembilan ===
- Gemas

=== Malacca ===
- Kesang River

=== Johor ===
- Along Sungai Air Molek in Johor Bahru
  - From Johor Bahru Prison, Federal Building (Wisma Persekutuan), Tabung Haji Building, JOTIC, Dewan Jubli Intan, until Court Building near Istana Besar.
- Skudai River in Johor Bahru
- Along Tebrau River in Johor Bahru
  - Kampung Kangkar Tebrau
- Johor River near Kota Tinggi
- Along Sungai Benut from Simpang Renggam to Benut
- Sungai Simpang Kiri and Sungai Simpang Kanan in Batu Pahat
- Along Semberong River in Batu Pahat
- Segamat River near Segamat
- Along Muar River from Segamat to Muar district

=== Sabah ===
- Along the Penampang Road
- Padas River
- Sandakan areas of Sim-Sim Road, BDC Road at Mile 1 (Batu Satu), Sepilok Road at Mile 14 (Batu 14) and Gum-Gum Road at Mile 16 (Batu 16)
- Tawau areas of Sin On Road, Chong Thien Vun Road, Pasadena Park, Aman Ria 5, LCN Park, Villa Park, Green Park, Eastern Plaza, Takada Commercial Square, Apas Batu Road 1 ½, Kampung Saadani Apas Batu Road 2, Kampung Pasir Puteh, Kampung Tanjung Batu, Leeka Park, Kampung Batu Dua, Pasadena Park and Setia Park

=== Sarawak ===
- Kuching areas
