= Hulu Terengganu Hydroelectric Project =

Hydroelectric power station in Terengganu, Malaysia

- Country: Malaysia
- Location: Terengganu, Malaysia
- Coordinates: 5°9′16″N 102°36′19″E
- Status: Operational
- Construction began: 2010
- Commission date: December 2015
- Owner: Tenaga Nasional Berhad
- Operator: Tenaga Nasional

Power generation
- Units operational: 2 x 125 MW
- Nameplate capacity: 250 MW

The Hulu Terengganu Hydroelectric Project is an underground hydroelectric power plant located the Terengganu, Malaysia. It was built from 2010 to 2015 by Tenaga Nasional Berhad, the largest electricity utility company in Malaysia.

== Location ==
The project is located about 50 km West of Kuala Terengganu upstream of Tasik Kenyir reservoir involving dams on both the Terengganu and Tembat rivers.

== Issues ==
World Wide Fund for Nature are questioning the need to clearfell an area three times larger than the size of the dam reservoir.

The International Union for Conservation of Nature has deemed 94 plant and animal species in the region threatened by extinction. Environmentalists are concerned that the project will kill endangered wildlife.

== See also ==
- List of power stations in Malaysia
- Environmental concerns with electricity generation
- Environmental issues in Malaysia
