= Teluk Rubiah =

Coordinates: 4.1674306°N 100.6185852°E

Teluk Rubiah was historically a secluded public beach and eco-resort destination in Manjung District, Perak, Malaysia, located approximately 10 km south of Lumut. From 1996 to 2010, the area was home to the Teluk Rubiah Beach & Golf Resort, which featured traditional Malay-style chalets and a 141-acre, 18-hole golf course beautifully integrated into the surrounding coastal forest reserve. Prior to that, it served as a residential housing area for Royal Malaysian Navy (TLDM) families following their relocation from Singapore in the late 1970s. In October 2010, the beach and resort were permanently closed to the public after the site was sold to the Brazilian mining giant Vale S.A. Today, the location has been entirely transformed into the heavy-industrial Teluk Rubiah Maritime Terminal (TRMT), a major deep-water iron ore distribution hub for the Asian market.
