= Wild Asia =

- Type: Social enterprise
- Industry: Sustainable agriculture; Sustainable tourism; Responsible tourism; Environmental consulting
- Founded: 2003
- Founders: Dr. Reza Azmi
- Headquarters: Kuala Lumpur, Malaysia
- Area served: Malaysia | Thailand
- Key people: Dr. Reza Azmi (Founder); Co-founders: Dennis Yong, Rick Gregory, Su Mei Toh, John Howes.
- Products: WAGS; WAGS BIO; SPIRAL
- Services: Sustainability certification; strategic risk assessments; professional training
- Number of employees: 42 (2025)
- Website: www.wildasia.org

Wild Asia is a Malaysian-based social enterprise headquartered in Kuala Lumpur. Formally incorporated as a non-profit-structured company, the organization focuses on the conservation of natural areas, environmental consultancy, and supporting local communities that are heavily dependent on natural resources. The work of Wild Asia is notable as they were one of the early pioneers to champion sustainability standards to local business, innovated models for advancing sustainable certification for independent producers, and regenerative agriculture in tropical crops. This has led to programmes that has been incorporated into global sustainable raw materials procurement or as part of improving the sourcing regions of raw materials (such as palm oil).

== History and origins ==
The seeds of Wild Asia were planted in 1998 when founder Dr. Reza Azmi established the Wild Borneo website. Originally designed as an eco-travelers' guide to highlight lesser-known destinations in Sabah, Borneo, the platform promoted sustainable tourism practices that directly supported indigenous community livelihoods.

By 2003, the network grew substantially to feature contributions from dozens of environmental writers across the continent. This evolution prompted its formal expansion and rebranding as Wild Asia in 2003. Founded by a dedicated core team of ecologists, social scientists, and long-term residents—including Dr. Reza Azmi, Dennis Yong, Rick Gregory, Su Mei Toh, and John Howes—the mission became centered on developing local, ground-up solutions that integrate nature and community welfare directly into corporate sustainable strategies.
