= Plug-in electric vehicles in Malaysia =

Tesla Model Y in Malaysia

As of December 2021, there were around 31,000 electric vehicles registered in Malaysia. As of 2021, about 0.05% of new cars sold in Malaysia were electric.

== Government policy ==
As of January 2022, electric vehicles are exempt from Malaysian road taxes.

As of 2022, electric vehicles are exempt from all import duties.

As of 8 February 2023, the Malaysian Ministry of International Trade and Industry (MITI) announced that Tesla has been given approval to establish its presence in the country.

== Charging stations ==
As of October 2021, there were 251 public charging stations in Malaysia. As of August 2021, there were 9 public DC charging stations in Malaysia.

As of 2022, the government offers subsidies of up to RM2,500 for charging station installations.

In February 2024, Melaka state has 118 charging bays.

== Charging Plug Type Compliance Standard in Malaysia ==
- Mode 1: Not Permitted due to its lack of automatic shut-off and not meeting minimum safety requirements.
- Mode 2 and 3: Type 2 connectors only due to their inbuilt locking mechanism and ability to carry both single phase and three phase electrical power.
- Mode 4: CCS Type 2 and CHAdeMO connectors only, specifically designed for DC quick charging and delivering high electrical power.
