= Eleventh Malaysia Plan =

Malaysia's five-year development plan

The Eleventh Malaysia Plan (11MP) (Malay: Rancangan Malaysia ke-11) 2016–2020 is Malaysia's five-year development plan towards realising the goal of Vision 2020. The preparation of the 11th Malaysia Plan is based on the National Development Strategy of Malaysia (MyNDS) which focuses on the development of people-based economy and capital-based economy with the implementation of high impact projects. The 11th Malaysia Plan was tabled at House of Representatives by Prime Minister of Malaysia Datuk Seri Najib Tun Razak on 21 May 2015.

== Cores ==
11MP has six cores:

1. Strengthening Inclusive Into the Right People
2. Increasing People's Prosperity
3. Enhancing Human Capital Development for Developed Countries
4. Sustainability and Development Resilience Through Green Growth
5. Strengthening Infrastructure to Support Economic Growth
6. Engineered Economic Growth for Increasing Prosperity
