= Global Environment Centre =

- Abbreviation: GEC
- Formation: 1998; 28 years ago
- Type: Nonprofit, NGO
- Headquarters: Petaling Jaya, Selangor, Malaysia
- Coordinates: 3°7′6.7″N 101°37′32.72″E
- Chairman: Zainudin Ismail
- Website: gec.org.my

Global Environment Centre (abbreviated: GEC) is a non-profit, non-governmental organization which was established in 1998 to address key environmental issues of global importance such as responsible consumption and production climate change, biodiversity and water resources. GEC is based in Malaysia but supports activities worldwide. It has field programmes in more than 10 countries and coordinates a number of regional and global networks.

The Organisation's mission is "to support the protection of the environment and sustainable use of natural resources to meet local, regional and global needs through strategic partnerships with communities and like-minded organisations". The Organisation organizes activities related to the forest and biodiversity conservation such as reforestation as well as other outreach and partnership programmes.

GEC was awarded the Environment and Planetary Health award, a category under the Merdeka Award for their contributions to the environment.
