= Income inequality in Malaysia =

View source data.
A chart of Malaysia's Income disparity, 2004.

According to the UNDP 1997 Human Development Report, and the 2004 United Nations Human Development (UNHDP) report, Malaysia has the highest income disparity between the rich and poor in Southeast Asia, greater than that of Philippines, Thailand, Singapore, Vietnam and Indonesia.

The UNHDP Report shows that the richest 10% in Malaysia control 38.4% of the economic income as compared to the poorest 10% who control only 1.7%. However, according to official statistics from the Prime Minister's Department, inequality has been decreasing steadily since 1970, with the Gini coefficient dropping to an all-time low of 0.40 in 2014.

== See also ==
- Poverty in Malaysia
- List of Malaysian states by household income
