= Air pollution in Malaysia =

Environmental issue in Malaysia

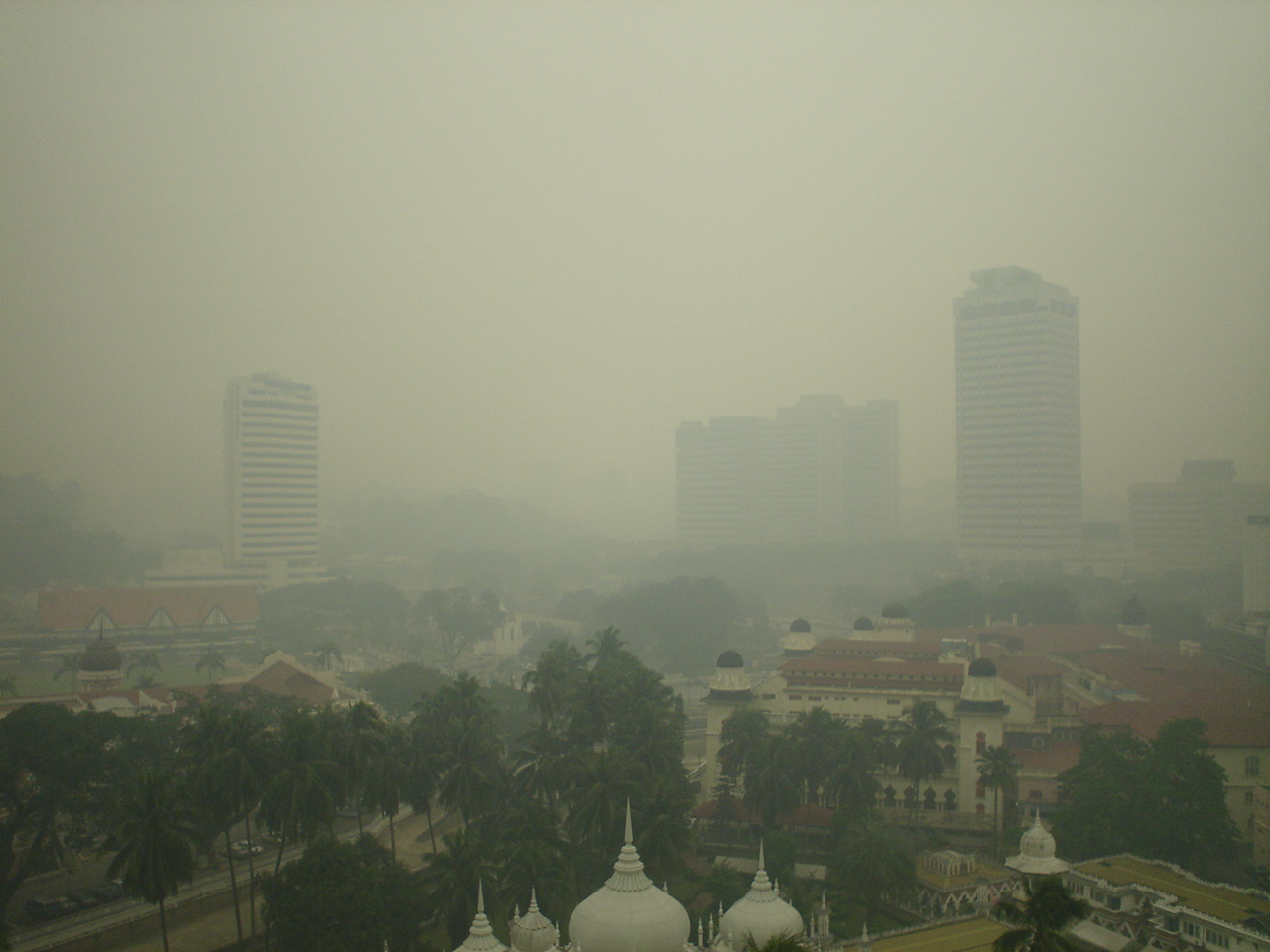
2005 Malaysian haze in Kuala Lumpur.

Air pollution has been an ongoing problem in many countries in the Southeast Asia region, and Malaysia is one of the worst affected. Haze has been a major issue for the country, driven by slash and burn practices by farmers and peat fires blown by the wind from Indonesia.

A state of emergency was announced in 2005 at Port Klang as the Air Pollution Index (API) went above 500. Malaysia has worked with the Indonesian authorities to help curb peat fires. Malaysia and Indonesia, together with other members of the ASEAN community, signed the ASEAN Agreement on Transboundary Haze Pollution in 2002 as a result of a 1997 haze.

== Air Pollution Index ==
The air quality in Malaysia is reported as the Air Pollution Index (API). Four of the index's pollutant components (i.e., carbon monoxide, ozone, nitrogen dioxide and sulfur dioxide) are reported in ppmv but PM_{10} particulate matter is reported in μg/m^{3}.

This scale below shows the health classifications used by the Malaysian government.

- 0-50 Good
- 51-100 Moderate
- 101-200 Unhealthy
- 201-300 Very unhealthy
- 301- Hazardous

If the API exceeds 500, a state of emergency is declared in the reporting area. Usually, this means that non-essential government services are suspended, and all ports in the affected area are closed. There may also be a prohibition on private sector commercial and industrial activities in the reporting area excluding the food sector.

== 2005 Malaysian haze ==
The 2005 Malaysian haze was a week-long choking smog-like haze over Malaysia that almost brought the central part of Peninsular Malaysia to a standstill, prompted crisis talks with Indonesia and caused widespread inconvenience. The haze was at its worst on August 11, 2005. This was a comeback of the haze crisis which last hit Malaysia in September 1997.

== 2015 Southeast Asian haze ==
The 2015 Southeast Asian haze was caused by mass illegal burning in Indonesia and resulted in over a month of haze in Malaysia, Singapore and parts of Thailand - triggering school closures and disrupting air travel. The haze was considered among the worst in history according to a NASA scientist. Researchers from Harvard and Columbia universities in the US estimated 6,500 people in Malaysia died prematurely due to the incident. But later, the claim was refuted by Indonesia, Singapore and Malaysian health authorities.

== See also ==
- 1997 Southeast Asian haze
- 2006 Southeast Asian haze
- Asian brown cloud
