= Megadiverse countries =

Nations with extremely high biological diversity or many endemic species

The 17 countries identified as megadiverse by Conservation International

A megadiverse country is one of a group of nations that house the majority of Earth's species and high numbers of endemic species. Conservation International identified 17 megadiverse countries in 1998, all of which are located at least partially in tropical or subtropical regions.

Megadiversity means to exhibit great biodiversity. The main criterion for megadiverse countries is endemism at the level of species, genera and families. A megadiverse country must have at least 5,000 species of endemic plants and must border marine ecosystems.

== List of megadiverse countries ==
In alphabetical order, the 17 megadiverse countries are:

- Australia
- Brazil
- China
- Colombia
- Democratic Republic of the Congo
- Ecuador
- India
- Indonesia
- Madagascar
- Malaysia
- Mexico
- Papua New Guinea
- Peru
- Philippines
- South Africa
- United States
- Venezuela

== List of most biodiverse countries 2022 ==
TOP 20 Global Biodiversity Index
Country (or dependent territory)	Bird	Amphibian	Fish	Mammal	Reptile	Vascular Plant	Biodiversity Index
Brazil	1,816	1,141	4,738	693	847	34,387	512.34
Indonesia	1,723	383	4,813	729	773	19,232	418.78
Colombia	1,863	812	2,105	477	634	24,025	369.76
China	1,285	540	3,476	622	554	31,362	365.84
Mexico	1,105	411	2,629	533	988	23,385	342.47
Australia	725	245	4,992	355	1,131	19,324	337.18
Peru	1,861	655	1,583	490	510	19,812	330.12
India	1,212	446	2,601	440	715	19,635	301.63
Ecuador	1,629	659	1,111	392	492	18,466	291.58
United States	844	326	3,081	531	556	15,500	280.13
Venezuela	1,386	365	1,735	376	419	30,000	273.39
Papua New Guinea	743	416	2,884	282	384	13,634	226.57
Myanmar	1,034	540	1,088	304	364	16,000	221.77
Vietnam	835	263	2,423	313	512	8,500	216.97
Malaysia	721	278	1,951	348	502	14,060	214.71
Democratic Republic of the Congo	1,110	227	1,528	465	313	8,860	214.43
Tanzania	1,074	207	1,773	412	346	10,100	213.10
Bolivia	1,435	259	407	382	315	14,729	209.55
South Africa	762	132	2,094	331	421	21,250	207.94
Thailand	936	153	2,150	314	468	6,600	200.77

== See also ==
- Biodiversity
- Biodiversity hotspot
- Biodiversity Index
