= Department of Environment (Malaysia) =

Malaysian government agency

- Jabatan Alam Sekitar جابتن عالم سكيتر

Department overview
- Formed: 1 September 1983; 42 years ago
- Jurisdiction: Government of Malaysia
- Headquarters: Level 1–4, Podium 2 & 3, Wisma Sumber Asli No.25, Persiaran Perdana, Presint 4, Pusat Pentadbiran Kerajaan Persekutuan, 62574 Putrajaya
- Minister responsible: Johari Abdul Ghani, Acting Minister of Natural Resources and Environmental Sustainability
- Deputy Minister responsible: Huang Tiong Sii, Deputy Minister of Natural Resources and Environmental Sustainability
- Department executive: Dato' Wan Abdul Latiff Wan Jaffar, Director-General
- Parent Department: Ministry of Natural Resources and Environmental Sustainability
- Key document: Environmental Quality Act 1974
- Website: www.doe.gov.my

The Department of Environment (Malay: Jabatan Alam Sekitar; Jawi: جابتن عالم سكيتر; officially abbreviated as JAS or DOE) is a Malaysian government agency under the Ministry of Natural Resources and Environmental Sustainability. Established in 1983, it entrusted to administering & overseeing issues related to the environment in Malaysia and monitoring the enforcement of activities pertained to flora and fauna.

== History ==
The Department of Environment (DOE) traced its origins back to 1975 when it was set up as the Environment Division under the Ministry of Local Government and Environment on 15 April 1975, based on the Environmental Quality Act 1974 which was gazetted in March 1974 and came into force a year later. The division was later placed under the Ministry of Science, Technology and Environment in March 1976.

On 1 September 1983, based on the importance of environmental preservation and conservation, the Environment Division was upgraded to a full-fledged Department and became known as the Department of Environment. In 1991, the department received RM 40.35 million allocation to conduct the environmental researches and projects. The DOE partnered with the National University of Malaysia (UKM) to set up the Environmental Training and Skills Institute (Institut Kemahiran dan Latihan Alam Sekitar; IKLAS) in 1996 with the aim to developed the trained human resources to handle environmental conservation activities.

In March 2004, the DOE was placed under the Ministry of Natural Resources and Environment (NRE). A year later, the department set up an action squad called the Environmental Crime Detectives (Perisik Jenayah Alam Sekitar), collectively known as ICE to handle the environmental crimes and combatting violations of the Environmental Quality Act.

== Awards and recognitions ==
In 2020, the DOE won the Asia Environmental Enforcement Awards 2020 from the United Nations Environment Programme (UNEP) at the Ceremony for the Asia Environmental Enforcement Awards 2020.

== See also ==
- Environmental issues in Malaysia
