= 2022 Malaysian east coast floods =

Natural disaster in Malaysia

- Date: 26 February 2022
- Location: Kelantan, Terengganu, and Pahang, Malaysia
- Cause: Continuous rainfall due to monsoon and LPA
- Outcome: Floods in east coast states
- Displaced: 26,789 people (as of 2 March 2022)

In late February 2022, floods occurred in the east coast of Peninsular Malaysia due to continuous rain from a monsoon and a low-pressure area (LPA). A danger-level warning was issued by the Malaysian Meteorological Department for Kelantan, Terengganu, and parts of Pahang. Several rivers exceeded regular levels in Kelantan and Pahang and on 2 March, 2,995 families or 9,056 people were displaced in Kelantan while 4,656 families or 17,641 people were displaced in Terengganu.

== Cause and impact ==
After continuous rain from 23 to 25 February, an LPA in the South China Sea and the monsoon season led to a continuous rain warning from the Malaysian Meteorological Department for several states staring the night of 25 February: alert level for 10 states, severe level for parts of Pahang, and danger level for Kelantan, Terengganu, and the rest of Pahang. The LPA was expected to bring heavy rainfall and strong winds across most parts of the peninsula. According to residents, a flood happening in late February was strange, with the last major flood in the area according to them in February being in 1984. The danger-level warning for the whole of Kelantan and Terengganu continued for 26 February. Flooding occurred in the states of Kelantan, Terengganu, and Pahang. On 25 February the Department of Irrigation and Drainage reported three important rivers in Kelantan that were in danger level: Sungai Lanas in Air Lanas (29.75 metres (97.6 feet)), Sungai Lebir in Kuala Krai (37.54 m (123.2 ft)), and Sungai Golok in Tanah Merah (25.19 m (82.6 ft)). Two rivers in Pahang also exceeded the alert level: Sungai Tembeling in Jerantut and Sungai Keratong in Rompin. Prime Minister Ismail Sabri Yaakob reported in a statement on 27 February said that NADMA and rescue agencies Fire and Rescue Department, PDRM, ATM and the Public Defense Forces, were ordered to relocate flood victims in Kelantan and Terengganu. From 25 to 27 February (48 hours), 400 millimetres (16 inches) of rain was recorded in Kuala Terengganu, Terengganu.

== Evacuations ==
At 16:00 MYT (08:00 UTC) on 25 February six families or 15 individuals were displaced in one evacuation centre in the town of Kuala Krai in Kelantan, 27 families or 92 people were staying in one evacuation centre in Kuantan in Pahang, and 196 families or 717 were placed in 11 evacuation centres in Terengganu (Hulu Terengganu, Kemaman, and Setiu). At 16:00 MYT (08:00 UTC) on 27 February 1,916 families or 5,653 individuals were displaced in 63 evacuation centres in seven districts of Kelantan while 2,122 families or 6,680 people were placed in 120 evacuation centres in eight districts of Terengganu. On 28 February 2,748 families or 8,880 people were displaced in 68 evacuation centres in seven districts of Kelantan while 3,160 families or 11,029 people were placed in 156 evacuation centres in eight districts of Terengganu. The hardest hit district of Kelantan on 28 February was Pasir Mas, where 5,943 evacuated. Meanwhile, in Terengganu, 4,284 evacuated in Kemaman. On 2 March 2,995 families or 9,056 people were displaced in 30 evacuation centres in five districts of Kelantan while 4,656 families or 17,641 people were displaced in 87 evacuation centres in seven districts of Terengganu.

== See also ==
- Weather of 2022
- 2021–2022 Malaysian floods
