= 2021–2022 Malaysian floods =

Natural disaster in Malaysia

2021–22 Malaysia floods
- Part of the 2021 Pacific typhoon season
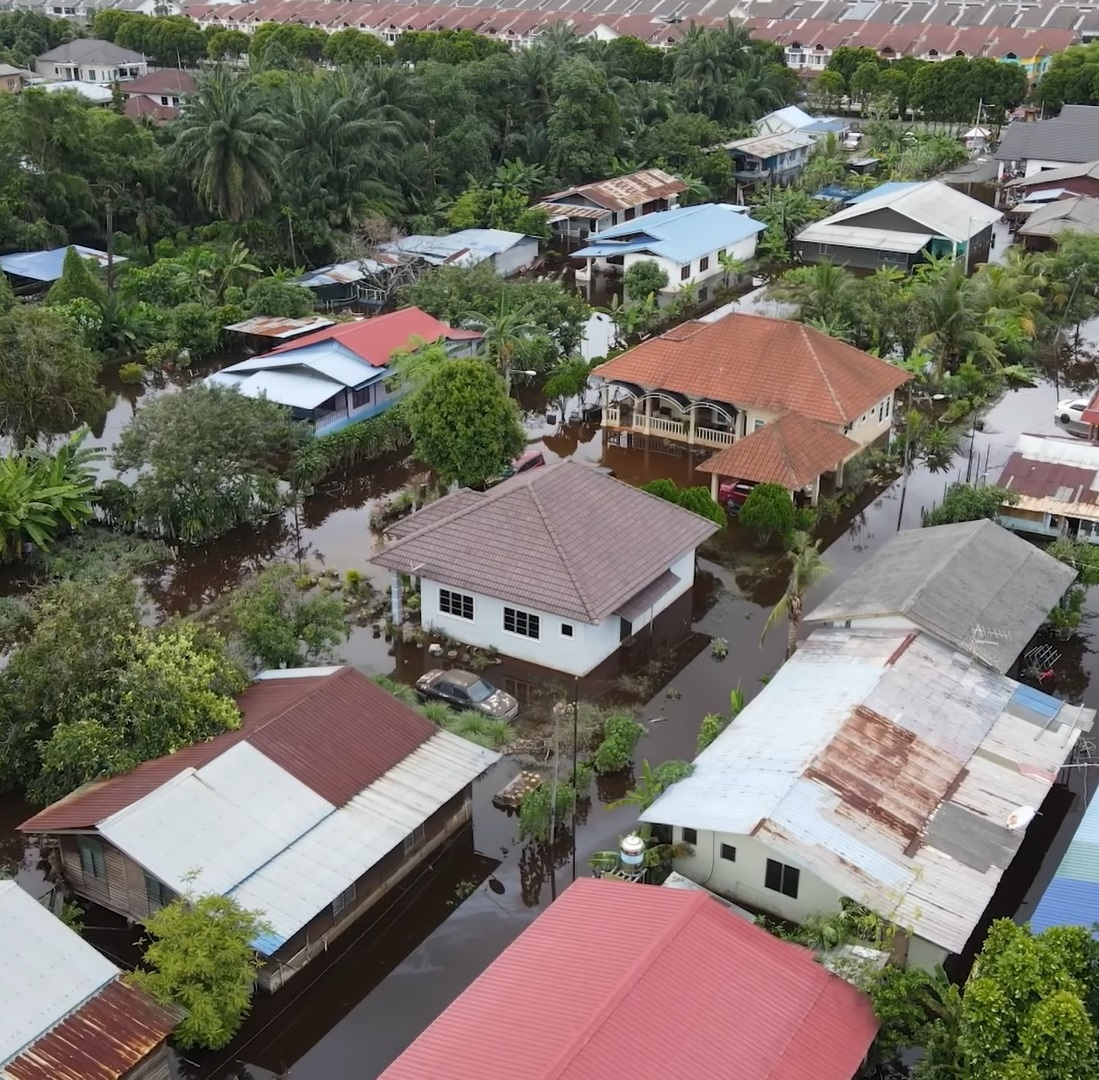
- Flooding at Klang
- Native name: Banjir Malaysia 2021–2022
- Date: 16 December 2021 – 19 January 2022 (1 month and 3 days)
- Location: Selangor (notably Klang, Petaling, Sepang and Hulu Langat District), Kuala Lumpur, Pahang and Perak; Negeri Sembilan, Malacca, Kelantan and Terengganu (limited) Sabah (from 30 December onwards)
- Also known as: December 2021 Central Malaysian floods, Peninsula Malaysia floods, Shah Alam floods
- Type: Flood
- Cause: After-effects from the landfall of Tropical Depression 29W (14 – 17 December 2021); Heavy rainfall across Sabah
- Outcome: Heavy flooding at four Malaysian states, minor flooding at four other states; Storm surges in Pahang; Looting reported
- Deaths: 54
- Injuries: Unknown
- Missing: 2
- Property damage: RM5.3 - 6.5 billion (US$1.27 - 1.55 billion, government estimations); RM20 billion (US$4.77 billion, unofficial estimations)
- Displaced: 71,000 (concurrent); 125,490 (cumulative)
- Notes: Death toll may rise due to missing victims.

On 16 December 2021, a tropical depression made landfall on the eastern coast of Peninsular Malaysia, bringing torrential downpours throughout the peninsula for three days. The resulting floods affected eight states across the peninsula, and left at least 54 dead and 2 missing. During its furthest extent, it caused the concurrent displacement of more than 71,000 residents, and have affected over 125,000 people overall.

Declared by government officials as a "once in a century" disaster, it is the worst flood in the country in terms of displaced residents since the 2014–2015 Malaysia floods. It has also been historically compared with the 1971 Kuala Lumpur floods. It is the deadliest tropical cyclone-related disaster to hit Malaysia since Tropical Storm Greg of 1996, which killed 238 people and left 102 more missing.

Record-high precipitations were measured at weather stations at Selangor and Kuala Lumpur. Widespread damages were reported in the states of Selangor and Pahang, especially the district of Hulu Langat and the city of Shah Alam. The Malaysian government has suffered criticism over its delayed response and apathy towards the disaster. Scientists, climate activists, and the media have largely made connections of this disaster as an example of extreme weather attributed to climate change.

== Weather events ==
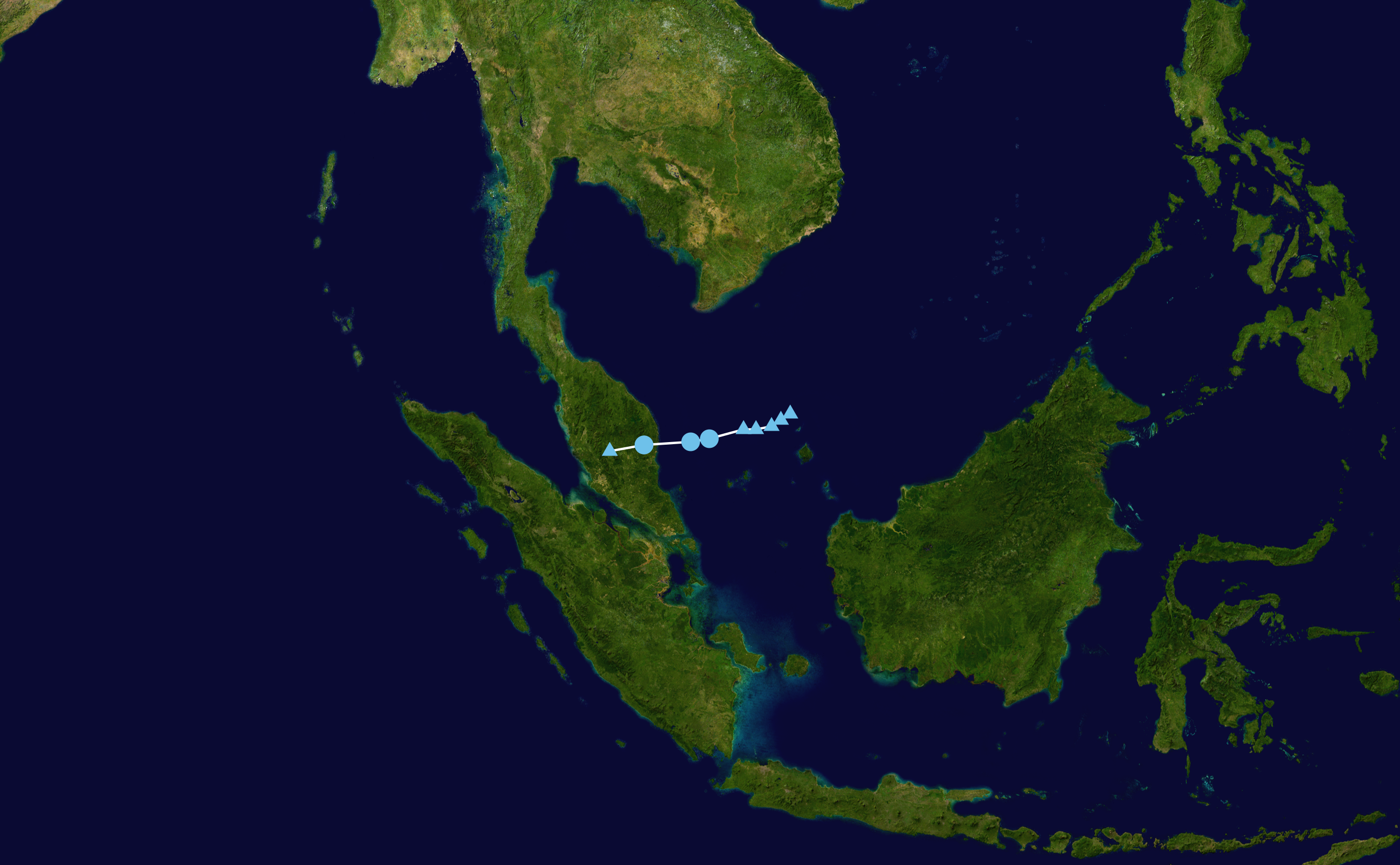
Map plotting the storm's track and intensity, according to the Saffir–Simpson scale Map key Saffir–Simpson scale Tropical depression (≤38 mph, ≤62 km/h) Tropical storm (39–73 mph, 63–118 km/h) Category 1 (74–95 mph, 119–153 km/h) Category 2 (96–110 mph, 154–177 km/h) Category 3 (111–129 mph, 178–208 km/h) Category 4 (130–156 mph, 209–251 km/h) Category 5 (≥157 mph, ≥252 km/h) Unknown Storm type Tropical cyclone Subtropical cyclone Extratropical cyclone, remnant low, tropical disturbance, or monsoon depression

On 14 December 2021, the Japan Meteorological Agency (JMA) (Note: The Japan Meteorological Agency is the official Regional Specialized Meteorological Center for the western Pacific Ocean.) upgraded a westward-moving low-pressure area to a tropical depression. The Joint Typhoon Warning Center (JTWC) (Note: The Joint Typhoon Warning Center is a joint United States Navy – United States Air Force task force that issues tropical cyclone warnings for the western Pacific Ocean and other regions.) began monitoring the system by the next day, noting the presence of a consolidated low-level circulation within the system. The system's chances of developing into a tropical cyclone slowly increased, and on 16 December at 17:30 UTC, the JTWC issued a Tropical Cyclone Formation Alert (TCFA) for the system despite the outflow of Typhoon Rai partially exposing the system's low-level circulation. By 21:00 UTC, the JTWC upgraded the system to a tropical depression, assigning it the designation 29W as it continued over marginally favorable developmental conditions. Shortly after, at 23:00 UTC, the depression made landfall north of the city of Kuantan in the state of Pahang, and began to weaken afterwards, prompting the JTWC to issue its final advisory on the system by the next day. The JMA stopped monitoring the system on 17 December at 12:00 UTC.

== Preparations ==
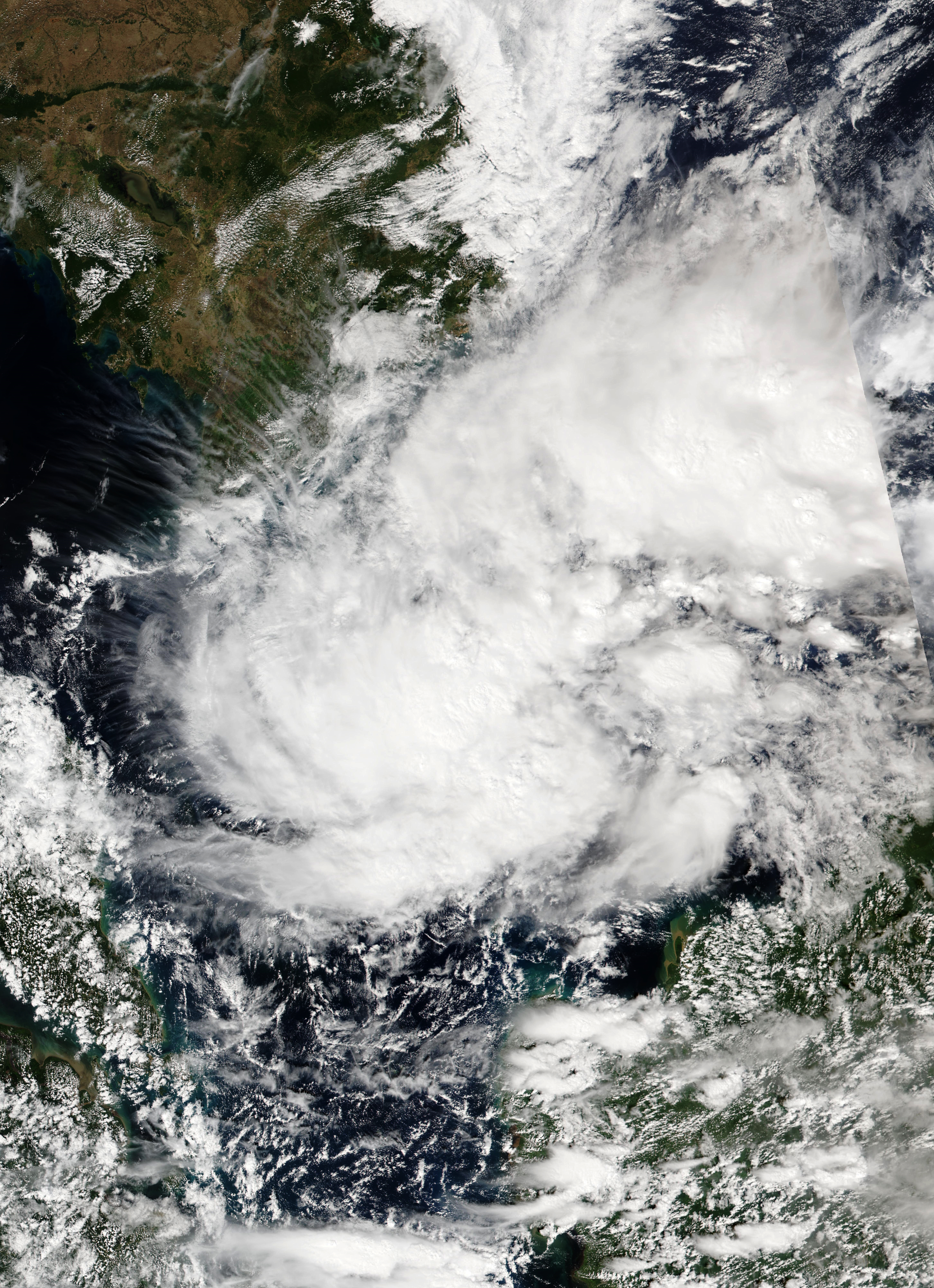
Tropical Depression 29W (2021)

Prior to the floods, the Kelantan Welfare Department prepared RM1.3 million (US$309,500) for relief efforts. The National Disaster Command Centre (NDCC or NADMA) had planned 5,731 temporary shelters (known locally by its Malay abbreviation, PPS) that could accommodate over 1.6 million victims across the nation for emergency purposes.

On 16 December, the Malaysian Meteorological Department (MMA or MetMalaysia) issued an orange alert for all districts of Kelantan and Terengganu and yellow alerts for Pahang, Perak, Kedah and Penang until 17 December. On the same day, flood warnings were issued by the National Flood Forecasting and Warning Centre (PRABN) to two districts at Kelantan (Kuala Krai District and Jeli District). The NDCC advised on the activation of state- and district-level disaster management committees following the alert. MetMalaysia subsequently issued an amber alert for persisted rainfalls across the Klang Valley. This alert was later raised to a red alert (the maximum level), and was expanded to neighbouring states, including Pahang. The Klang Gates Dam released 25 per cent of its reservoir in stages after water levels exceeded acceptable ranges. By 18 December, flood operation centres were activated in all districts of Kelantan. Later that night, Tuan Ibrahim, the Minister of Environment and Water, released an emergency statement requesting immediate preparations at Kuala Lumpur from floods after the breaching of four main rivers across the city. The SMART Tunnel was activated amidst the increasing precipitation, and achieved record-high diversion volumes of approximately five-million cubic meters of flood water.

Staff and displaced residents of relief centres were regularly screened for COVID-19 to prevent outbreaks from occurring.

Rainfall warnings associated with the December 2021 Malaysian floods (MetMalaysia)
Date	Time	Warning type	Areas
15 December	13:30 MST	Continuous Heavy Rain Alert	Kelantan, Terengganu, Pahang (Jerantut, Kuantan, Pekan)
15 December	13:30 MST	Continuous Heavy Rain Alert	Perlis, Kedah, Penang, Perak (Kerian, Larut, Matang and Selama, Hulu Perak, Kuala Kangsar)
17 December	01:20 MST	Severe Continuous Heavy Rain Warning	Kelantan, Terengganu, Pahang (Cameron Highlands, Kuantan)
17 December	01:20 MST	Continuous Heavy Rain Alert	Perlis, Kedah, Penang, Perak (Kerian, Larut, Matang dan Selama, Hulu Perak, Kuala Kangsar), Pahang (Lipis, Jerantut, Pekan)
17 December	07:10 MST	Dangerous Continuous Heavy Rain Warning	Terengganu (Kemaman), Pahang (Kuantan)
17 December	07:10 MST	Severe Continuous Heavy Rain Warning	Kelantan, Terengganu (all districts except Kemaman), Pahang (Cameron Highlands, Jerantut, Pekan)
17 December	07:10 MST	Continuous Heavy Rain Alert	Perlis, Kedah, Penang, Perak, Pahang (Raub, Bentong, Temerloh, Maran, Bera)
17 December	15:45 MST	Severe Continuous Heavy Rain Warning	Kelantan, Terengganu
17 December	15:45 MST	Continuous Heavy Rain Alert	Kedah (Baling, Kulim, Bandar Baharu), Penang, Perak, Pahang (all districts except Rompin), Selangor (Sabak Bernam, Kuala Selangor, Hulu Selangor)
17 December	22:45 MST	Continuous Heavy Rain Alert	Perak (all districts except Parit Buntar, Larut Matang and Selama, Gerik), Kelantan, Terengganu, Pahang (all districts except Rompin and Pekan), Selangor, Kuala Lumpur, Putrajaya
18 December	01:00 MST	Severe Continuous Heavy Rain Warning	Pahang (Lipis, Jerantut, Maran, Kuantan)
18 December	01:00 MST	Continuous Heavy Rain Alert	Perak (all districts except Parit Buntar, Larut, Matang and Selama, Gerik), Kelantan, Terengganu, Pahang (Cameron Highlands, Raub, Bentong, Temerloh, Bera)
18 December	01:00 MST	Continuous Heavy Rain Alert	Selangor, Kuala Lumpur, Putrajaya, Negeri Sembilan
18 December	12:00 MST	Severe Continuous Heavy Rain Warning	Kelantan (Gua Musang), Pahang (Cameron Highlands, Lipis, Jerantut, Maran, Kuantan)
18 December	12:00 MST	Continuous Heavy Rain Alert	Kedah (Kuala Muda, Sik, Baling, Kulim, Bandar Baharu), Penang, Perak
18 December	12:00 MST	Continuous Heavy Rain Alert	Kelantan (all districts except Gua Musang), Terengganu, Pahang (Raub, Bentong, Temerloh, Bera, Pekan, Rompin), Selangor, Kuala Lumpur, Putrajaya, Negeri Sembilan, Malacca (Alor Gajah)
18 December	14:00 MST	Dangerous Continuous Heavy Rain Warning	Selangor (all districts except Sepang), Kuala Lumpur
18 December	14:00 MST	Severe Continuous Heavy Rain Warning	Perak (Hilir Perak, Muallim), Kelantan (Gua Musang), Pahang (Cameron Highlands, Lipis, Jerantut, Bentong, Maran, Kuantan), Selangor (Sepang), Putrajaya, Negeri Sembilan (Jelebu)
18 December	14:00 MST	Continuous Heavy Rain Alert	Kedah (Kuala Muda, Sik, Baling, Kulim, Bandar Baharu), Penang, Perak (all districts except Hilir Perak, Muallim), Kelantan (all districts except Gua Musang), Terengganu, Pahang (Raub, Temerloh, Bera, Pekan, Rompin), Negeri Sembilan (all districts except Jelebu), Melaka (Alor Gajah)
18 December	22:30 MST	Dangerous Continuous Heavy Rain Warning	Pahang (Jerantut, Bentong, Kuantan), Selangor (all districts except Sepang), Kuala Lumpur
18 December	22:30 MST	Severe Continuous Heavy Rain Warning	Perak (Hilir Perak, Muallim), Kelantan (Gua Musang), Pahang (Cameron Highlands, Lipis, Raub, Temerloh, Maran, Pekan), Selangor (Sepang), Putrajaya, Negeri Sembilan (Jelebu)
18 December	22:30 MST	Continuous Heavy Rain Alert	Kedah (Kuala Muda, Sik, Baling, Kulim, Bandar Baharu), Penang, Perak (all districts except Hilir Perak, Muallim), Kelantan (all districts except Gua Musang), Terengganu, Pahang (Bera, Rompin), Negeri Sembilan (all districts except Jelebu), Malacca, Johor (Tangkak, Segamat, Muar, Batu Pahat)
19 December	01:40 MST	Dangerous Continuous Heavy Rain Warning	Perak (Manjung, Kinta, Perak Tengah, Kampar, Bagan Datuk, Hilir Perak, Batang Padang, Muallim), Pahang (Cameron Highlands, Lipis, Raub, Jerantut, Bentong, Kuantan), Selangor (all districts except Sepang), Kuala Lumpur
19 December	01:40 MST	Severe Continuous Heavy Rain Warning	Kedah (Kuala Muda, Kulim, Bandar Baharu), Penang, Perak (Kerian, Larut, Matang and Selama, Kuala Kangsar), Kelantan (Gua Musang), Pahang (Temerloh, Maran, Pekan), Selangor (Sepang), Putrajaya, Negeri Sembilan (Jelebu)
19 December	01:40 MST	Continuous Heavy Rain Alert	Perlis, Kedah (all districts except Kuala Muda, Kulim, Bandar Baharu), Perak (Hulu Perak), Kelantan (all districts except Gua Musang), Terengganu, Pahang (Bera, Rompin), Negeri Sembilan (all districts except Jelebu), Malacca, Johor (Tangkak, Segamat, Muar, Batu Pahat)
19 December	11:30 MST	Dangerous Continuous Heavy Rain Warning	Perak (Manjung, Kinta, Perak Tengah, Kampar, Bagan Datuk, Hilir Perak, Batang Padang, Muallim)
19 December	11:30 MST	Severe Continuous Heavy Rain Warning	Kedah (Kuala Muda, Kulim, Bandar Baharu), Penang, Perak (Kerian, Larut, Matang and Selama, Kuala Kangsar), Pahang (Cameron Highlands, Lipis, Raub, Jerantut, Kuantan)
19 December	11:30 MST	Continuous Heavy Rain Alert	Perlis, Kedah (all districts except Kuala Muda, Kulim, Bandar Baharu), Perak (Hulu Perak), Kelantan, Terengganu, Pahang (Bentong, Temerloh, Maran, Bera, Pekan, Rompin), Selangor (Sabak Bernam, Hulu Selangor)
19 December	06:00 MST	Continuous Heavy Rain Warning discontinued	Involves all regions in the warning issued on 11:30 MST.
21 December	06:45 MST	Continuous Heavy Rain Alert	Perlis, Kedah, Penang, Perak (Kerian, Larut, Matang and Selama)
21 December	22:00 MST	Continuous Heavy Rain Warning discontinued	Involves all regions in the warning issued on 06:45 MST.
No warnings were issued between 22 and 23 December
24 December (issued for 27 December)	14:00 MST	Continuous Heavy Rain Alert	Sabah (Lahad Datu, Telupid, Kinabatangan, Beluran, Sandakan, Kudat)
No warnings were issued between 25 and 27 December
28 December	14:00 MST	Continuous Heavy Rain Alert	Warning extended until 2 January 2022; expanded to Kelantan (all districts except Gua Musang), Terengganu, Pahang (Jerantut, Maran, Kuantan, Pekan, Rompin), Johor (Mersing)
29 December	14:00 MST	Continuous Heavy Rain Alert	Warning expanded to all districts of Kelantan and Johor
30 December	11:20 MST	Dangerous Continuous Heavy Rain Warning	Kelantan (Jeli)
30 December	11:20 MST	Severe Continuous Heavy Rain Warning	Kelantan (Tanah Merah, Machang, Kuala Krai, Gua Musang), Terengganu (Besut, Hulu Terengganu, Dungun, Kemaman), Pahang (Jerantut, Maran, Kuantan, Pekan)
30 December	11:20 MST	Continuous Heavy Rain Alert	Perlis, Kedah (Kubang Pasu, Pokok Sena, Padang Terap, Pendang, Sik, Baling), Perak (Hulu Perak), Kelantan (Tumpat, Pasir Mas, Kota Bharu, Bachok, Pasir Puteh), Terengganu (Setiu, Kuala Nerus, Kuala Terengganu, Marang), Pahang (Cameron Highlands, Lipis, Rompin), Johor
30 December	11:20 MST	Continuous Heavy Rain Alert	Sabah (Ranau, Lahad Datu, Telupid, Kinabatangan, Beluran, Sandakan, Kudat)
30 December	13:25 MST	Dangerous Continuous Heavy Rain Warning	Kelantan (Jeli), Terengganu (Kemaman), Pahang (Kuantan)
30 December	13:25 MST	Severe Continuous Heavy Rain Warning	Kelantan (Tanah Merah, Machang, Kuala Krai, Gua Musang), Terengganu (Besut, Hulu Terengganu, Dungun), Pahang (Jerantut, Maran, Pekan)
30 December	13:25 MST	Continuous Heavy Rain Alert	Perlis, Kedah (Kubang Pasu, Pokok Sena, Padang Terap, Pendang, Sik, Baling), Perak (Hulu Perak), Kelantan (Tumpat, Pasir Mas, Kota Bharu, Bachok, Pasir Puteh), Terengganu (Setiu, Kuala Nerus, Kuala Terengganu, Marang), Pahang (all districts except Kuantan, Jerantut, Maran, Pekan), Johor
30 December	13:25 MST	Continuous Heavy Rain Alert	Sabah (Ranau, Lahad Datu, Telupid, Kinabatangan, Beluran, Sandakan, Kudat)
30 December	15:50 MST	Dangerous Continuous Heavy Rain Warning	Kelantan (Jeli, Kuala Krai, Gua Musang), Terengganu (Besut, Hulu Terengganu, Dungun, Kemaman), Pahang (Jerantut, Maran, Kuantan, Pekan)
30 December	15:50 MST	Severe Continuous Heavy Rain Warning	Kelantan (all districts except Jeli, Kuala Krai, Gua Musang), Terengganu (Setiu, Kuala Nerus, Kuala Terengganu, Marang), Pahang (Cameron Highland, Lipis, Temerloh, Bera, Rompin)
30 December	15:50 MST	Continuous Heavy Rain Alert	Perlis, Kedah (Kubang Pasu, Pokok Sena, Padang Terap, Pendang, Sik, Baling), Perak (Hulu Perak), Pahang (Raub, Bentong), Johor
30 December	15:50 MST	Continuous Heavy Rain Alert	Sabah (Ranau, Lahad Datu, Telupid, Kinabatangan, Beluran, Sandakan, Kudat)
31 December	04:45 MST	Dangerous Continuous Heavy Rain Warning	Kelantan (Jeli, Kuala Krai, Gua Musang), Terengganu (Besut, Hulu Terengganu, Dungun, Kemaman), Pahang (Jerantut, Maran, Kuantan, Pekan, Rompin), Johor (Mersing, Kota Tinggi)
31 December	04:45 MST	Severe Continuous Heavy Rain Warning	Kelantan (Tumpat, Pasir Mas, Kota Bharu, Tanah Merah, Bachok, Machang, Pasir Puteh), Terengganu (Setiu, Kuala Nerus, Kuala Terengganu, Marang), Pahang (Tanah Tinggi Cameron, Lipis, Temerloh, Bera), Johor (Segamat, Kluang)
31 December	04:45 MST	Continuous Heavy Rain Alert	Perlis, Kedah (Kubang Pasu, Pokok Sena, Padang Terap, Pendang, Sik, Baling), Perak (Hulu Perak), Pahang (Raub, Bentong), Johor (Tangkak, Muar, Batu Pahat, Pontian, Kulai, Johor Bahru)
31 December	04:45 MST	Continuous Heavy Rain Alert	Sabah (Ranau, Lahad Datu, Telupid, Kinabatangan, Beluran, Sandakan, Kudat)
31 December	12:30 MST	Severe Continuous Heavy Rain Warning	Pahang (Jerantut, Maran, Kuantan, Bera, Pekan, Rompin), Johor (Segamat, Kluang, Mersing, Kota Tinggi)
31 December	12:30 MST	Continuous Heavy Rain Alert	Kelantan, Terengganu, Pahang (Tanah Tinggi Cameron, Lipis, Raub, Bentong, Temerloh), Johor (Tangkak, Muar, Batu Pahat, Pontian, Kulai, Johor Bahru)
31 December	12:30 MST	Continuous Heavy Rain Alert	Sabah (Tuaran, Ranau, Kota Belud, Telupid, Beluran, Sandakan, Kudat)
31 December	20:50 MST	Severe Continuous Heavy Rain Warning	Pahang (all districts except Bentong, Temerloh), Johor (Segamat, Kluang, Mersing, Kota Tinggi)
31 December	20:50 MST	Continuous Heavy Rain Alert	Kelantan, Terengganu, Pahang (Bentong, Temerloh), Johor (Tangkak, Muar, Batu Pahat, Pontian, Kulai, Kota Bahru)
31 December	20:50 MST	Continuous Heavy Rain Alert	Sabah (Tuaran, Ranau, Kota Belud, Telupid, Beluran, Sandakan, Kudat)
31 December	22:35 MST	Severe Continuous Heavy Rain Warning	Pahang (all districts except Bentong, Temerloh), Negeri Sembilan (Jempol), Johor (all districts except Pontian, Kulai, Johor Bahru)
31 December	22:35 MST	Continuous Heavy Rain Alert	Perak (all districts except Kerian, Larut, Matang and Selama, Gerik, Kuala Kangsar), Kelantan, Terengganu, Pahang (Bentong, Temerloh), Selangor (Sabak Bernam, Kuala Selangor, Hulu Selangor), Negeri Sembilan (Kuala Pilah, Rembau, Tampin), Melaka, Johor (Pontian, Kulai, Johor Bahru)
31 December	22:35 MST	Continuous Heavy Rain Alert	Sabah (Tuaran, Ranau, Kota Belud, Telupid, Beluran, Sandakan, Kudat)
1 January	02:30 MST		
1 January	02:30 MST	Severe Continuous Heavy Rain Warning	Pahang (all districts except Bentong, Temerloh), Negeri Sembilan (Kuala Pilah, Rembau, Jempol, Tampin), Melaka, Johor (all districts except Pontian, Kulai, Johor Bahru)
1 January	02:30 MST	Continuous Heavy Rain Alert	Perak (Manjung, Kinta, Perak Tengah, Kampar, Bagan Datuk, Hilir Perak, Batang Padang, Muallim), Kelantan, Terengganu, Pahang (Bentong, Jemerloh), Selangor (Sabak Bernam, Kuala Selangor, Hulu Selangor), Johor (Pontian, Kulai, Johor Bahru)
1 January	02:30 MST	Continuous Heavy Rain Alert	Sabah (Tuaran, Ranau, Kota Belud, Telupid, Sandakan, Beluran, Kudat)
1 January	06:30 MST		
1 January	06:30 MST	Dangerous Continuous Heavy Rain Warning	Negeri Sembilan (Kuala Pilah, Jempol, Tampin)
1 January	06:30 MST	Severe Continuous Heavy Rain Warning	Pahang (all districts except Bentong, Temerloh), Negeri Sembilan (Rembau), Melaka, Johor (all districts except Pontian, Kulai, Johor Bahru)
1 January	06:30 MST	Continuous Heavy Rain Alert	Kelantan, Terengganu, Pahang (Bentong, Temerloh), Selangor (Hulu Langat), Negeri Sembilan (Jelebu, Seremban, Port Dickson), Johor (Pontian, Kulai, Johor Bahru)
1 January	06:30 MST	Continuous Heavy Rain Alert	Sabah (Tuaran, Ranau, Kota Belud, Telupid, Sandakan, Beluran, Kudat)
1 January	13:00 MST		
1 January	13:00 MST	Severe Continuous Heavy Rain Warning	Pahang (all districts except Bentong, Temerloh), Negeri Sembilan (Rembau), Melaka, Johor (all districts except Pontian, Kulai, Johor Bahru)
1 January	13:00 MST	Continuous Heavy Rain Alert	Kelantan, Terengganu, Pahang (all districts except Cameron Highlands, Lipis, Raub, Bentong, Temerloh), Sabah (Tuaran, Ranau, Kota Belud, Telupid, Sandakan, Beluran, Kudat); warning extended until 4 January
1 January	13:00 MST	Continuous Heavy Rain Alert	Perak (Manjung, Kinta, Perak Tengah, Kampar, Bagan Datuk, Hilir Perak, Batang Padang, Muallim), Selangor, Kuala Lumpur, Putrajaya, Negeri Sembilan (Jelebu, Seremban, Port Dickson), Johor (Pontian, Kulai, Johor Bahru); warning extended until 3 January

== Impact ==
Deaths by state
States	Deaths
Selangor	45
Pahang	21
Kelantan	4
Sabah	3
Negeri Sembilan	1
Total	74
Missing	17

Displaced victims (NDCC estimates of 23 December 2021)
States	Displaced
Pahang	33,353
Selangor	31,644
Kelantan	1,559
Kuala Lumpur	332
Negeri Sembilan	301
Perak	225
Total	67,576

Tropical Depression 29W's crossing of central Malaysia brought long periods of sustained downpours. Several meteorological records were broken during the process. A weather station at Sentul recorded a peak daily rainfall of 363 millimetres (14.3 in), equivalent to a month's worth of rainfall at the region. It was followed by measurements of 273 millimetres (10.7 in) at Sungai Bonus Tun Abdul Razak, 258 millimetres (10.2 in) at Jinjang, and 247 millimetres (9.7 in) at Gombak. Amirudin Shari, the Menteri Besar of Selangor, was notified by the Selangor Department of Irrigation and Drainage that the state had received 380 millimetres (15 in) of rainfall. Previously, the state's highest rainfall measurements were at 180 millimetres (7.1 in).

During its furthest extent, 71,000 people from eight states were evacuated to emergency shelters. The NDCC announced a refined figure of 69,134 people displaced on 21 December. On 23 December, Inspector-General of Police Acryl Sani Abdullah Sani announced the displacement figures at 68,341 people.

Some portions of the Federal Highway, New Klang Valley Expressway (NKVE), and the Karak Highway were exposed to landslides and flooding, which made them entirely impassable. At the Karak Highway, 450 motorists were stranded for two days before they were rescued. 226 people were rescued from the NKVE. The Kemuning-Shah Alam Highway (LKSA), which faced minor flooding, was closed for two days. NDCC estimated that 224 roads (126 state, 98 federal) were disrupted by circumstances related to the floods. 333 electrical substations from six states were closed down for safety reasons, leading to power cuts.

At least 181 COVID-19 cases were detected among evacuees. Health Minister Khairy Jamaluddin warned on 20 December that the disaster could lead to an increase in infections in the country.

=== Kelantan ===
Kelantan was among the first states to receive heavy rainfall from Tropical Depression 29W. Five rivers in Kelantan recorded rises in water levels on 16 December, of which three achieved dangerous levels for the next two days. On 17 December, multiple districts of Kelantan were flooded, leading to the evacuation of 548 inhabitants from four districts, housed in eight temporary shelters. Two patients infected with COVID-19 had to be evacuated to Gua Musang Hospital to prevent the spread of infection among other evacuees.

By 18 December, the floods reached Pasir Mas. The first death was reported that day, after the body of a factory operator—who had fallen off a motorcycle while riding through a flooded road—was discovered at 2:22 pm near a Chinese cemetery at Gambang. The number of evacuated victims rose to 1,084, with 17 shelters set up statewide in five districts. Police have been deployed to the Sultan's Pier at Kota Bharu "to prevent crowds from going there to watch the rising river". The displaced victims peaked at 2,632 later that day, but has dropped constantly since then. The figure dropped during the subsequent week to within a thousand people, and by 24 December, the figure was 974 in five different temporary shelters.

The Menteri Besar of Kelantan, Ahmad Yakob, drew comparisons between these floods in his state and the 2014-15 floods, which faced similar issues.

=== Terengganu ===
Minor flooding prior to the landfall of 29W on 3 December left 140 people displaced at Setiu and Besut for several days.

On 16 December, when 29W crossed Kelantan, two rivers were reported to have exceeded their respective danger levels (Dungun River and Tebak River). The first temporary shelter was opened at an elementary school at Setiu. It was followed by another temporary shelter at the town hall of Dungun. There were 21 displaced victims. By 18 December, the figure rose slightly to 63, and peaked at 285 by the end of the day. However, as the extent of the floods at the state were minor, only 9 evacuees remained three days later. The last temporary shelter, at Kemaman, was closed on 21 December.

On 30 December, continuous rainfall was again observed in the state. At 4 pm, Dungun became the first to receive flooding, when 69 people were evacuated to a temporary shelter at the district. By late night, the Terengganu state Disaster Management Secretariat was informed that major rivers at Besut, Dungun, and Hulu Terengganu had breached their respective danger levels. By 31 December, the number of evacuees rose to 388. They were housed in two temporary shelters at Dungun.

=== Selangor and Kuala Lumpur ===
Selangor and Kuala Lumpur suffered the most rainfall throughout the event. MetMalaysia issued the severest alert for 8 districts at the state for continuous rainfall since 17 December for 4 days. However, floods had already been present at Sepang, Hulu Langat and Klang a day before the warning was issued. 16 rivers had breached the danger level by then. On 18 December, 3,086 victims were displaced in 30 temporary shelters, the majority being at Klang. An extra 11 shelters were set up later that day. 93 water pumps were deployed to remove the floodwaters at the scene, while 134 floodgates were closed to prevent overflows from high tides. Residents of Kajang and Salak Tinggi were advised to evacuate. The main electrical substation at Glenmarie exploded during the night, causing a blackout across some parts of Shah Alam. Two water treatment plants were shut down from the floods, leading to water cuts at 472 areas across Klang Valley. Another plant was forced to limit water outputs due to water quality issues. Water supply trucks could not reach the affected regions as most roads were closed down or cut off from the floods. The Shah Alam City Council (MBSA) published an announcement on the evening refraining people from entering Shah Alam and Klang. At Kuala Lumpur, large tracts of Dataran Merdeka, Jalan Masjid India and Kampung Kasipillay were flooded. Flood waters between the main roads connecting the town of Meru and Bukit Raja were measured with a depth of 2 to 3 metres (6.6 to 9.8 ft). Dozens of residents, who failed to return to their homes in time, were forced to sleep in their cars.

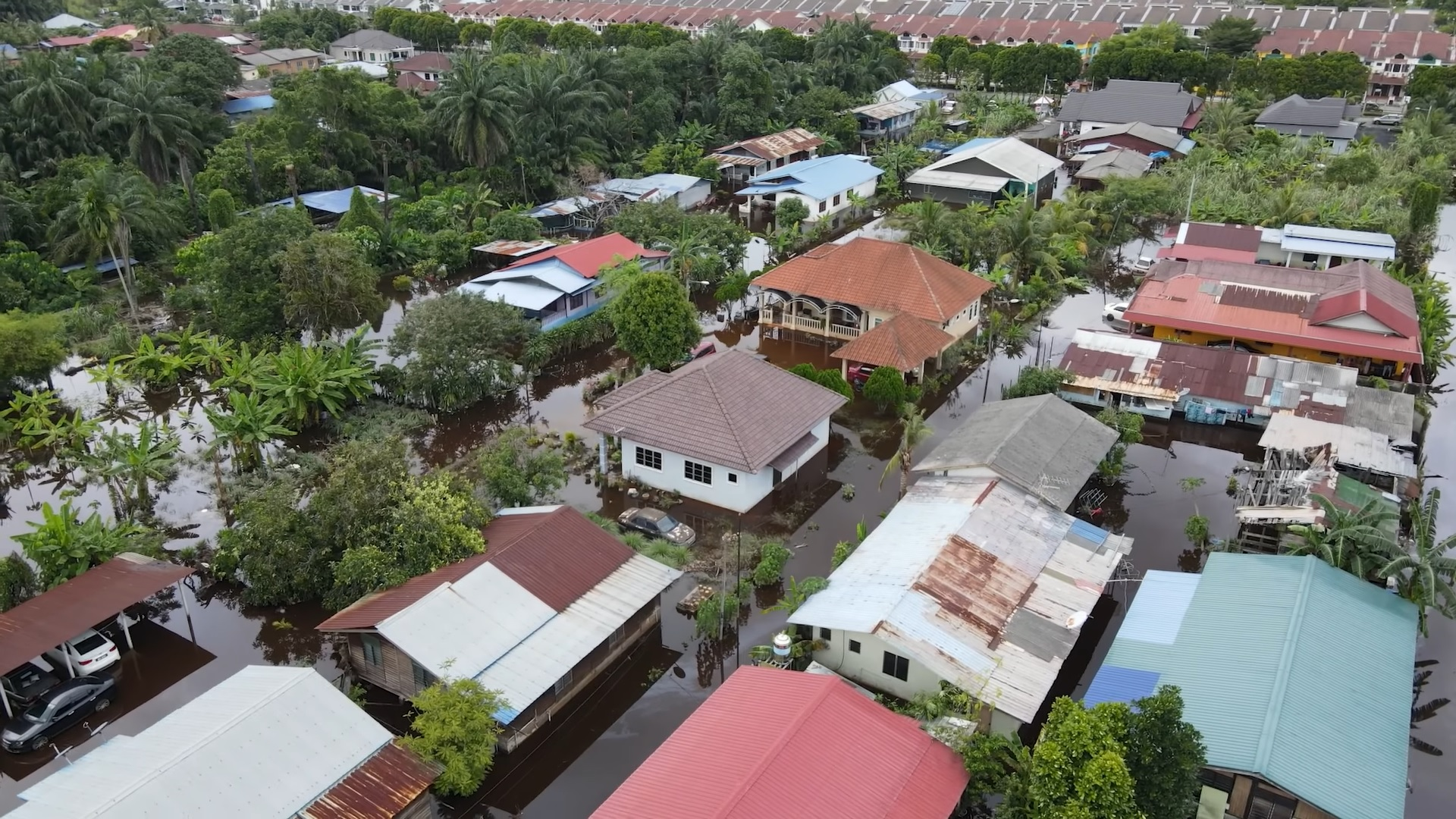
Flooding at Klang

The number of flood victims doubled overnight. On 19 December, 6,242 victims were displaced. In a tweet, the Menteri Besar of Selangor welcomed boat owners to assist in relief efforts, which were coordinated by the state government via the Smart Selangor Operations Centre (SSOC). The severity of the situation has caused the state government to approach the Prime Minister, Ismail Sabri Yaakob, and Minister of Defence, Hishamuddin Hussein, for federal intervention and assistance on the evacuation and humanitarian aid for flood victims. The federal government, although not expecting the situation at Selangor, mobilised federal resources shortly after. Tenaga Nasional, the only electric utility company in Malaysia, announced power disruptions at 82 areas at Klang. The number of displaced victims surpassed 15,000 during the day. The number of temporary shelters meanwhile had increased to 108. The first death at the state was reported the same day, when a body was discovered 350 metres (1,150 ft) way from an apartment at Section 22 of Shah Alam. Videos and images of the discovery went viral across social media networks.

Flood waters began to recede on 20 December. At 4 am, the Selangor State Contingent Police Headquarters announced that 73 roads were closed in the state. The number of displaced victims increased to 32,044 in 162 temporary shelters, the peak figure of the state. Three COVID-19 assessment centres (CAC) in Petaling and Hulu Langat was closed due to the floods. The Kuala Lumpur City Hall (DBKL) had identified at least 40 different locations that were cleared of fallen trees. At 8 am on 21 December, there were 30,632 displaced victims, and by 4.30 pm, the figure had dropped to 26,647. Fifteen people were confirmed to have died from the flood. The death toll rose to 24 the next day. An anonymous source had reported to Free Malaysia Today that members of the Armed Forces had involved themselves in rescue efforts without any orders from the NDCC, and that the Selangor state government were reluctant to call for help from the Armed Forces in rescue operations. The reports have since been denied by the state government.

An apartment in Shah Alam was declared unsafe after concerns over the structural integrity of the complex following the floods. Residents were evacuated to relief shelters in accordance with the local authorities.

==== Taman Sri Muda (Shah Alam) ====
The township of Taman Sri Muda, located at Shah Alam, recorded 14 deaths. The township was entirely flooded and suffered catastrophic damage. 16 pumps were used to expedite the pumping process at Sri Muda.

There was a lack of food for two days at the township, leading to looting at several inundated convenience stores and supermarkets during the afternoon of 20 December. Baharudin Mat Taib, Assistant Commissioner of the Shah Alam police chief, confirmed the reports. 31 looters were arrested during a break-in. Eight police teams were deployed on 23 December at the area to prevent further break-ins. The managing director of Mydin, Ameer Ali Mydin, whose stores were involved among the looting, released a statement forgiving all victims who looted his store "out of desperation and hunger".

=== Pahang ===
Floods in Pahang were initially reported in three villages at Kuantan during the late hours of 16 December, although the extent was minor. Floodwaters at the villages receded the following morning. However, Maran and Raub suffered floods the same day after 48 hours of continuous rain, and by 8 pm almost 200 people were evacuated. In Jerantut, three temporary shelters were created when 128 people were evacuated. Roads linking to Kuala Tembeling, Felda Padang Piol, and several other villages were entirely cut off where floodwaters were measured to be 0.8 m (2.6 ft) deep.

On 19 December, flooding was present in seven districts with 5,189 displaced victims in 116 temporary shelters. 19 rivers had exceeded their danger levels. By 22 December, 38,086 people were displaced. Storm surges were reported in the state.

Pahang reported its first death on 17 December, when a factory operator drowned near a Chinese cemetery at Gambang.

Only one death has been confirmed, although there may be other unconfirmed deaths.

==== Bentong mudslide ====
During the late-night of 18 December, a mudslide at Bentong destroyed a series of chalets. Ten were swept away by the strong currents, and five were killed during the incident.

=== Malacca ===
Heavy rain had persisted over Alor Gajah, Melaka Tengah and Jasin since 17 December. The first temporary shelter was opened the following day when 40 people were evacuated amidst floods across several villages. The rising water levels at Rembau River caused the collapse of the riverbanks near the Berembang River, resulting in floods at Lubok Cina that were 1.8 m (5.9 ft) deep. It was reported to be the worst floods to hit the region in 50 years. At Kuala Linggi, the local tilapia farming industry, situated near the Linggi River, was severely damaged when over 70,000 tilapia newborns were killed as a result of contamination from floodwaters. There were 465 displaced victims on 21 December. On 23 December, the figure dropped to only 136, and 26 on 27 December. Difficulties in pumping flood waters from affection areas persisted due to high water levels still present in nearby rivers.

Floods in Malacca remained unimproved since 26 December and worsened from the 31st. By 1 January, the number of displaced rose from 96 to 507 in a single day. Eight temporary shelters were set up for the 500 victims. The number surpassed 1,000 on 2 January. The Malacca Drainage and Irrigation Department had reported rainfall levels of 150 mm (5.9 in) on 1 January at the Malacca River, causing overflows during high tides. This caused the flooding of Morten Village, a popular historical tourist attraction in the city. By 3 January, the floods had expanded to 32 areas in the state. The number of evacuees had risen to 2,537.

The federal government had channeled RM400,000 (US$95,900) of aid through the NDCC which were distributed by the Malacca state government to 390 households as compassionate aids (known locally as BWI) on 29 December.

=== Negeri Sembilan ===
Negeri Sembilan was hit by floods on 18 December. 274 people were evacuated from 29 different areas in the initial displacement. They were sheltered at five relief centres. A government clinic at Jelebu could not operate due to floods. The NDCC accounted 68 severely damaged telecommunications towers throughout the state. Operations in two water treatment plants in Seremban and Jelebu were paralysed after receiving structural damages. The Negeri Sembilan State Forestry Department had closed down all recreational forests temporarily on 20 December. Landslides were reported in several areas, notably at Kampung Amar Penghulu and Taman Eko Rimba Jeram Toi. According to Maryani Chembeng, the village chief of Kampung Amar Penghulu, it was the worst flood the village had encountered since 1971.

The amount of displaced victims increased to 765 people on 21 December in eight temporary shelters. The number of victims had risen to 787 people on 24 December. The number of displaced people dropped to 82 (27 December) and 43 (28 December). Heavy continuous rains resumed over the state between 31 December to 1 January, which had drastically worsened the flooding. On 1 January, the amount of displaced victims stood at 1,363 people. The number of evacuees rose to 1,767 on 2 January.

The Negeri Sembilan Solid Waste Management and Public Cleansing Corporation (SWCorp) collected over 1,151 tonnes of waste over a period of 8 days. The Negeri Sembilan state government had allocated RM39.6 million (US$9.46 million) to repair local infrastructure.

=== Sabah ===
Many parts of Sabah started evacuations as rain continued to pour in areas such as Kudat. The number of evacuees increased to approximately 1,161 people (from Kota Marudu, Kudat, Paitan, Beluran, Telupid and Sandakan)

According to the report, Kota Belud, Tuaran and Telupid was hit by scattered rainfall.

== Responses ==
=== Domestic ===
- Malaysia – The Malaysian government directed 66,015 personnel from the Royal Malaysia Police (RMP or PDRM), Malaysian Armed Forces (MAF or ATM), Fire and Rescue Department of Malaysia (JBPA), Malaysia Civil Defence Force (MCDF or APM), Malaysian Public Works Department (JKR), Department of Social Welfare (JKM) and state agencies to aid the rescue efforts in the affected regions. Five hundred volunteers from the Skuad Keluarga Malaysia (SKM) programme were involved in duties related to temporary shelters. 453 vehicles staffed by 2,817 service members from seven agencies were deployed to aid the rescue effort. A special task force has since been formed by the government to tackle issues post-flooding and to prepare for a second wave of floods. Utility companies have announced rebates and discounts to assist those affected by the floods. Examples include Tenaga Nasional Berhad's 100-per cent rebate, repairs by car companies, and an increase in aid for the repair of houses. On 6 January 2022, the Penang state government announced the formation of its natural disaster management unit.

=== International ===
- Singapore – On 21 December 2021, the Singapore Red Cross Society (SRC) pledged humanitarian aid of US$50,000 each for the Malaysian Red Crescent Society (MRCS) and the Philippine Red Cross (PRC) in response to the floods in Malaysia and the aftermath of Typhoon Rai at the Philippines. A day later, the Singaporean government announced their decision to contribute a further US$60,000 to support the SRC's public fundraiser, supplementing their donation of US$50,000 to a total of US$90,000.
- United Arab Emirates - The Ministry of Foreign Affairs expressed its condolences to the victims of the disaster in a statement on 22 December 2021. The Emirates government and the Emirates Red Crescent (ERC) co-directed operations to send humanitarian aid in the form of food and medical supplies to Malaysia, and sent a team of volunteers to review the situation.
- Iran - The Iranian Red Crescent Society (IRCS) offered search and rescue teams and other assistance towards the relief efforts for the recent floods. In a letter to the MRCS on 24 December 2021, the President of the IRCS, Dr. Pir Hossein Kolivand conveyed his condolences towards the victims affected by the disaster.
- Brunei - Hassanal Bolkiah, the sultan of Brunei, expressed his condolences on 24 December 2021 to the Malaysian government and the Malaysian people over the floods at the region. He also made similar messages to the Philippine government over the destruction caused by Typhoon Rai in the country.
- Saudi Arabia - Minister of Defence, Hishamuddin Hussein, has revealed on 26 December 2021 that Turki bin Faisal Al Saud, a Saudi Arabian cabinet minister, has expressed intentions from the Saudi Arabian government to contribute to the relief efforts at Malaysia.
- United States of America - In a statement, the American embassy in Malaysia has announced on 30 December 2021 that they have pledged US$100,000 to the MRCS.
- Egypt - In a letter to Abdullah of Pahang and Ismail Sabri on 31 December 2021, Egyptian president Abdel-Fattah al-Sisi has expressed his condolences towards the families and victims in the floods.

=== Non-governmental organisations ===
- Apple Inc. – Tim Cook, the CEO of Apple Inc., announced the company intends to contribute to the disaster relief efforts at the Philippines and Malaysia, although the details of the contribution are not specified.

== Criticism of the government ==
The Malaysian government was criticised over its lack of immediate response towards relief efforts. There were complaints on social media that the authorities were slow in providing aid, with many victims relying on volunteers for food and basic necessities. Puan Sri Shariffa Sabrina Syed Akil, the president of a local conservation group, cited the slow response as a consequence of ineffective bureaucracy. The Prime Minister of Malaysia, Ismail Sabri Yaakob, publicly acknowledged certain "weaknesses" over the government's response towards the disaster.

A decision involving Azhar Azizan Harun, Speaker of the Dewan Rakyat's refusal to permit members of parliament from the opposition party to discuss recent events related to the floods in the Parliament sparked widespread debate and controversy. The move by Azhar was criticised by politicians from both the ruling and opposition parties, with some calling for his resignation.

== Lawsuit ==
In June 2022, 50 residents of Taman Sri Muda in Shah Alam, Selangor, have filed a lawsuit in the Shah Alam High Court against 10 respondents for more than RM3.7 million in compensation over the December 2021 floods. The 10 respondents are:

1. The director-general of the Natural Disaster Management Agency (Nadma),
2. The minister in the Prime Minister's Department,
3. The director-general of the Malaysian Meteorological Department,
4. The Minister of Environment and Water,
5. The director-general of the Department of Irrigation and Drainage,
6. Shah Alam City Council (Majlis Bandaraya Shah Alam; MBSA),
7. KDEB Waste Management Sdn Bhd,
8. Tenaga Nasional Berhad (TNB),
9. Selangor state government, and
10. Government of Malaysia

All but two of the respondents, TNB and the Selangor state government, have filed applications to strike out the lawsuit. In July 2023, the Shah Alam High Court dismissed both MBSA's and KDEB's applications to strike out the lawsuit, with Justice Mohd Zaki Abdul Wahab saying that there were issues that needed to be heard at a full trial.

== Connection to climate change ==
Prior to the floods, scientists and organizations including Renard Siew, climate change advisor to the Centre for Governance and Political Studies, and the Intergovernmental Panel on Climate Change had warned that extreme weather events would become more common as a consequence of climate change, including heavy rainfall. In an interview with CNA, Renard said that due to climate change, it would be harder for climatologists to predict the weather accurately, citing that the northeast monsoon which usually causes floods on the east coast of Peninsular Malaysia has also affected the west coast this time. He also disagreed with the government's claims regarding the 100-year flood, citing that in recent years, the devastating flooding caused by climate change had recently occurred in other regions including Europe, China and the United States. His statement was later echoed by environment lecturer at Universiti Putra Malaysia, Haliza Abdul Rahman, where she added that this flood and the recent floods in Turkey were caused by climate change. She also similarly disagreed that the flood was labelled as a "100-year flood", as similar events could also happen in the future. In order to mitigate this issue, aside from improving weather monitoring systems, experts and activists have urged action to be taken to reduce the effects of climate change. This includes reducing carbon emissions, encouraging public transport and carpooling as a means of transportation, ending deforestation, and encouraging global cooperation to tackle climate change. Moreover, this could involve reviewing the construction of infrastructure that will be affected by storms, flooding and rising sea levels, and granting international aid to help countries cope with climate change.

== See also ==
- Floods in Malaysia
- List of deadliest floods
- Tropical cyclones in 2021
- Tropical cyclones in 2022
- Tropical cyclones in Malaysia
- Weather of 2021
- Weather of 2022
