= 2015 East Malaysian floods =

Natural disaster in Malaysia

- Date: 17 January – 6 February
- Location: (Kuching, Kota Samarahan, Simunjan, Mukah, and Limbang in Sarawak), (Beaufort (Membakut), Papar, Tenom and Sipitang in Sabah)
- Deaths: 1 confirmed dead
- Property damage: $1.03 billion (USD)

High intensity rainfall since 17 January 2015 caused major flooding across several parts of Sarawak and Sabah. Around 13,878 people had been evacuated with one teenage girl became the only casualty.

== Background ==
According to a paper published by Malaysian Meteorological Department (MMD) in 2012 titled "Malaysia Climate Change Scenarios", the northeast monsoon has become more intense. There were drier months corresponding with heavier rainfalls in the past 10 years. As part of the northeast monsoon, continuous rain affected most areas in Sarawak including Johor in West Malaysia and parts of Sabah. MMD in a statement on 4 January said Kuching Division was expected to receive 900mm of rain while other divisions in Sarawak would receive between 400mm to 500mm of rain.

=== Preparation ===
Sarawak had been raising its level of preparedness since 7 January as the meteorological department had forecast continuous rain in Sarawak. Around 3,417 personnel from various departments and agencies were ready to be mobilised to disaster and flood areas. The Sarawak state government put 239 lorries, 178 four-wheel-drives, three helicopters, a Royal Malaysian Air Force plane and three jet skis on standby. Operators at Sg Nyigu Light Industrial area, Bintulu were advised to clear industrial waste from their compounds in order to prevent flash floods from happening.

== Affected areas ==
=== Sarawak ===
On 19 January, the floods had left many low-lying areas in the south of the state of Sarawak submerged in water thus forcing the people there to evacuate. A total of 22 relief centres opened in Kuching Division. More than 2,000 people evacuated from Kuching and its surrounding areas. A total of 1,015 villagers from 264 families in Kampung Simpok were evacuated to a relief centre in Sekolah Kebangsaan St Peter Kampung Simpok, Padawan. A main water pipe in Padawan also burst, leaving 20,000 villagers without water supply. There were also several landslides at Jalan Puncak Borneo, Kuching. As of 22 January, there were 3,373 evacuees in Kuching and 1,598 evacuees in Samarahan Division. Samarahan residents blamed on poor drainage system as the cause of floods. On 26 January, only two relief centres left open in Samarahan. The Kuching Division and coastal area of Simunjan were declared flood free.

The flood also affected the central region of Sarawak especially in Mukah and Balingian. On 19 January, a boat capsized in the Mukah river and a teenage girl became the first casualty of the flood. As on 22 January, there were 34 evacuees in Mukah. On 26 January, strong water currents swept two cars off Jalan Tatau, Bintulu. However, nobody was hurt during the incident. Rising water levels at Sungai Sebungan, Sebauh had forced 300 villagers to move to higher grounds. Only one relief centre was left open in Mukah on 26 January. On January 27, flooding at Kuala Tatau had caused 198 people from 73 families to evacuate from their homes.

In northern Sarawak, the flood also affected the Pan Borneo Highway which links Sarawak with Brunei and Sabah. On 20 January, pupils from Sekolah Kebangsaan Siang, Lawas were evacuated in anticipation of floods in the morning. As of 22 January, the number of evacuees from Limbang has risen to 1,244 people. A total of 9 schools were closed at Limbang and 5 schools were closed at Lawas. Limbang petrol station was also crowded due to public fear of limited supply of petrol. Flood victims at Baram claimed that they did not receive sufficient food ration for their daily needs. As of 26 January, one relief centre left open in Marudi while 356 people from 117 families still left in three relief centres at Limbang. On 30 January, flash floods occurred in Miri.

On 19 January, a total of 3,201 people were evacuated from their homes due to floods. A total of 39 relief centres opened on that day. As of 22 January, the overall flood situation in Sarawak had improved. The total number of evacuees had decreased from 10,000 to 6,249 people. A total of 27 schools were closed in Sarawak. As of 26 January, only 835 people from 265 families were still in relief centres. On 29 January, floods receded almost completely in Sarawak, where only 19 people from 6 families stayed in Sebauh relief centre. No major thefts were reported during the period of flooding in Sarawak. Plantations and timber operations in Sarawak has not been affected by floods.

=== Sabah ===
In Sabah, more than 500 families are currently seeking shelter at seven relief centres with the number of evacuees keep increasing. Around 2,700 students were affected as 11 schools were closed due to the floods. As of 23 January, 39 schools with 7,000 students were affected by the flooding. The number of evacuees however continued to decrease as water levels began receding in several parts of Beaufort and Membakut.

== Responses ==
=== Locals ===
Malaysia — Prime Minister Najib Razak instructed the relevant agencies to channel aid to the people affected by floods immediately. He said he had been monitoring the situation over the past three days and would continue to monitor the situation. Several officers from the agencies under the Malaysian Finance Minister has visit the flood areas in Sarawak and announced that all flood aid will be given to both Sarawak and Sabah. The Ministry of Finance agreed to distribute RM 500 to each of the 1,691 evacuated families in the state. In Sabah, the United Malays National Organisation (UMNO) branch of Beaufort activated its party machinery to help flood victims in the district. Federal Ministry of Rural and Regional Development also allocated RM 850,000 for infrastructure improvements in flood affected villages at the northern region of Sarawak. The federal government also delivered 1,240 safety vests to Sarawak.

On 19 January, Sarawak chief minister Adenan Satem assured that the flood situation is under control and preparations were done for evacuation centres. Kuching barrage which was built as part of Sungai Sarawak Regulation Scheme in 1997, has helped to mitigate the flood problem around Kuching city. A new disaster unit would also be set up under the Ministry of Women, Family and Community Development of Sarawak. The ministry also proposed that lively and meaningful activities such as motivational and health talks should be carried out to relieve the stress of flood victims. In Sibu, Department of Irrigation and Drainage (DID) engineer claimed that the Sibu flood mitigation project has been successful in keeping water out of the area except for low-lying areas which were due to inadequate drainage system.

Automobile manufacturer Perodua offered discounts on selected vehicle parts and free services for Perodua car owners affected by floods in Sarawak. Sarawak Fire and Rescue Department (JBPM) will receive seven Toyota Hilux four-wheel-drive and nine lorries in March or April in order to tackle future flood situation in Sarawak.

=== International ===
Brunei — A large group of Brunei non-governmental organisations and volunteers in a convoy of 31 four-wheel drive vehicles crossed the Brunei–Malaysia border to deliver aid on Limbang and Lawas in Sarawak. The convoy delivered food, bottled water, clothes and other form of assistance to all victims in the area.

== See also ==
- 2014–15 Malaysia floods
