= Flora of Malaysia =

The Flora of Malaysia comprises a vast assemblage of plant species estimated to over 15,500 vascular plants. Malaysia boasts 8,019 species of seed plants: 19 species of Gymnosperms and 8,000 Angiosperms. Globally, Malaysia is ranked 14th in terms of species of vascular plants. The Flora of Malaysia consist of approximately 15,000 species of vascular plant. Peninsular Malaysia has around 8,200 species of vascular plants while places such as Sabah and Sarawak has around 12,000 species. Most Flora can be found in the dense rainforest of Malaysia.

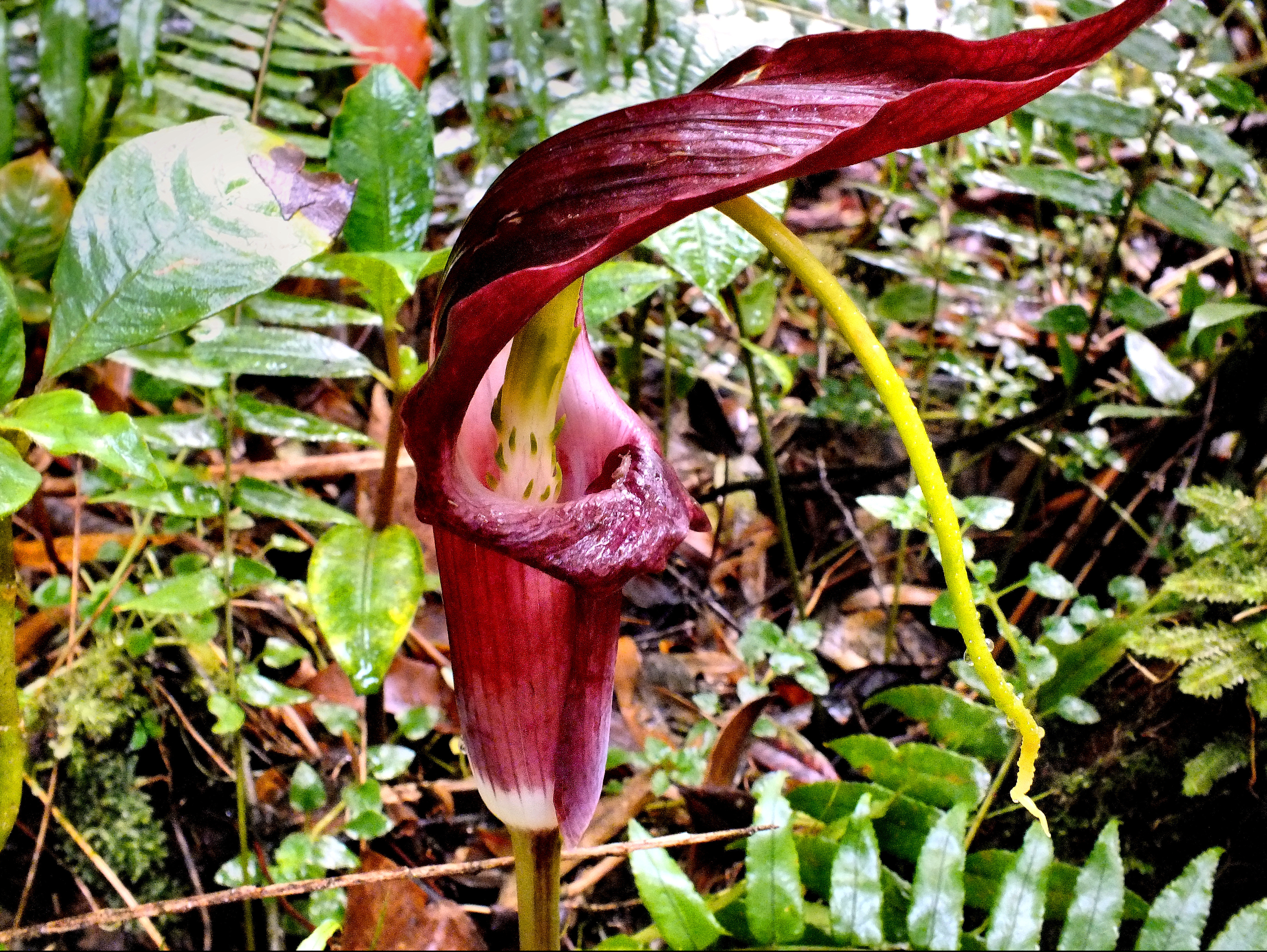
My-13-4030-Cobra-Cobra-Lily-Cameron-Cobra-Lily-HiR

== Origins ==
Malaysia was part of the southern supercontinent Gondwana that broke up about 180 million years ago. A major interdigitation of Australian and Malesian flora is estimated to have occur in the late Tertiary and Quaternary time.

Many of Malaysia's plants can be traced back to ancient rainforests that have flourished in the region for millions of years. These rainforests are the oldest forests in the world and serve as a swing for diverse plant life. Malaysia is located on the equator and various topography, including mountains, lowlands and coastal areas, contribute to its botanical diversity. In addition, Malaysia's flora has also been influenced by human activity, including agriculture, trade, and urbanization. Some plants have been introduced to Malaysia from other parts of the world, while others have been selectively bred or cultivated for various purposes.

== Vegetation types ==
Major forest types in Malaysia are lowland dipterocarp forest, hill dipterocarp forest, low hill dipterocarp forest, oak-laurel forest, montane ericaceous forest, peat swamp forest and mangrove forest. In addition, there also smaller areas of freshwater swamp forest, heath forest, forest on limestone and forest on quartz ridges.

== Habitat ==
The forests in Malaysia are mostly dominated by trees from the dipterocarp forests. The dipterocarp forest occurs on dry land just above sea level to an altitude of around 900 metres. Other than that, the forest canopy is very dense where a small amount of sunlight can penetrate it. Because of that, the undergrowth plants are usually poorly developed and believed to be impenetrable. A large amount of rainforest has been destroyed due to agricultural or commercial purposes, and also by severe wind and lightning storms.

== Types of Flora ==
- Rafflesia: 28 Species
- Hibiscus: 200-250 Species
- Ixora: 545 Species
- Bougainvillea: 18 Species
- Orchid: 28,000 Species
- Allamanda: 15 Species
- Pterocarpus Indicus-Angsana: 2 Species
- Fuchsia: 110 Species
- Centaurea Cyanus: 101 Species
- Plumeria/Frangipani: 4 Species
- Heliconia/Lobster claws: 40 Species
- Lantana camara/Big Sage: 650 Species
- Mimosa Pudica: 400 Species
- Heliconia: 42 Species
- Adenanthera Pavonina
- Rhododendron Vireya: 300 Species
- Rosa Rugosa: 100 Species
- Chrysanthemum: 23,000 Species

== See also ==
- Wildlife of Malaysia
- List of plants of Malaysia
