= Forestry Department of Peninsular Malaysia =

Malaysian government agency

- Jabatan Perhutanan Semenanjung Malaysia جابتن ڤرهوتنن سمننجوڠ مليسيا
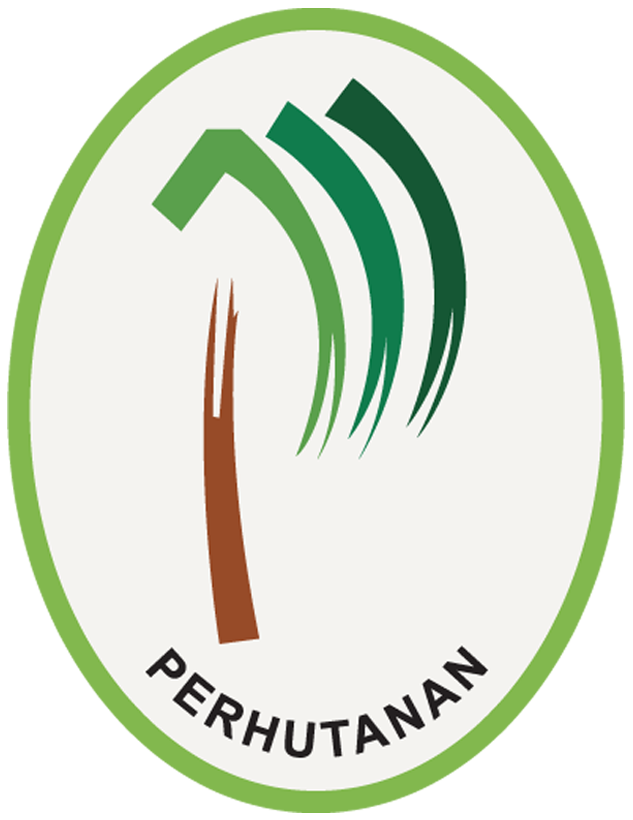

Department overview
- Formed: 16 October 1901; 124 years ago
- Jurisdiction: Government of Malaysia
- Headquarters: Jalan Sultan Salahuddin, 50660 Kuala Lumpur, Malaysia
- Minister responsible: Arthur Joseph Kurup, Minister of Natural Resources and Environmental Sustainability
- Deputy Minister responsible: Syed Ibrahim Syed Noh, Deputy Minister of Natural Resources and Environmental Sustainability
- Department executive: Mohd Radhi Chu Abdullah, Director-General
- Parent department: Ministry of Natural Resources and Environmental Sustainability
- Key document: National Forestry Act 1984
- Website: www.forestry.gov.my

The Forestry Department of Peninsular Malaysia (Malay: Jabatan Perhutanan Semenanjung Malaysia; Jawi: جابتن ڤرهوتنن سمننجوڠ مليسيا; officially abbreviated as JPSM or FDPM) is a Malaysian government agency under the Ministry of Natural Resources and Environmental Sustainability that responsible for managing, planning, protecting and developing permanent forest reserve areas throughout Peninsular Malaysia.

== Background ==
The Forestry Department's goal is to sustainably manage and develop forest resources to contribute to Malaysia's socio-economic development, while raising public awareness of the importance of forests and its functions. Specifically, its objectives include establishing and managing Permanent Forest Reserves, increasing the contribution of the forestry sector to national income, and promoting optimal forest management through an efficient technical and administrative cooperation.

Malaysia is regarded as one of the countries in the world with a high forest cover and has a diversified ecology, while its permanent forest reserves are protected reserve areas for wild tree species (flora) and wildlife (fauna) that are closely monitored by the state government. Tropical evergreen rain forests, particularly dipterocarp forests, are the dominant vegetation in Malaysia, covering vast areas with distinct layers of dense foliage, high biodiversity, and iconic commercial timber species. These intact forest structures and ecological diversity, distinctive terrain, regions are used for forest production and recreation, and other specific uses are of national interests.

== History ==
The Forestry Department of Malaya was established on 16 October 1901 and it is one of few oldest government agencies in Malaysia. Since the Forestry Department was set up, Malaysia has practiced a good forest management system. One of the key aspects of good forest management is a systematic logging activities. The state Forestry Department is entrusted to surveilling forest reserves in each states of Peninsular Malaysia and logging activities in accordance to rules and regulations issued by the state licensing authorities. After Malaysia was established in 1963, the Forestry Department of Malaya changed its name to Forestry Department of Peninsular Malaysia.

By the end of 1997, the Forestry Department began to gazette all the remaining state forest land, which was approved for certain purposes by the state governments. The department celebrates its centennial anniversary on 16 October 2001.

== Initiatives ==
=== Malaysia Greening Program ===
The Malaysia Greening Program (Program Penghijauan Malaysia) and the 100 Million Tree Planting Campaign (Kempen Penanaman 100 Juta Pokok) were the programs initiated by the Forestry Department, the Forest Research Institute of Malaysia (FRIM), and the Ministry of Energy and Natural Resources. Under this program, the department targeting the planting of 100 millions of trees in a period of 4 years from 2021 to 2025, increasing public awareness about the importance of green cover and forests and nurturing social responsibilities and environmental sustainability among Malaysians. The target of 100 million trees planting was successfully achieved a year early through the planting of a Merbau tree as the 100 millionth tree by the Prime Minister, Anwar Ibrahim at the Herbal Garden, Parliament of Malaysia on 10 December 2024. As of June 2025, more than 115 millions of trees from 1,972 species have been planted, surpassing its target.

== See also ==
- Forest Research Institute of Malaysia (FRIM)
