= Ministry of Natural Resources and Environmental Sustainability =

Government ministry of Malaysia

- Kementerian Sumber Asli dan Kelestarian Alam
- Coat of arms of Malaysia

Ministry overview
- Formed: 13 December 2023; 2 years ago
- Preceding Ministry: Ministry of Lands and Co-operatives Development Ministry of Science, Technology and Environment Ministry of Agriculture Ministry of Natural Resources and Environment Ministry of Water, Land and Natural Resources Ministry of Energy and Natural Resources Ministry of Environment and Water Ministry of Natural Resources, Environment and Climate Change
- Jurisdiction: Government of Malaysia
- Headquarters: Block F11, Kompleks F, Lebuh Perdana Timur, Presint 1, 62000 Putrajaya, Malaysia
- Employees: 13,700 (2017)
- Annual budget: MYR 2,386,704,300 (2026)
- Minister responsible: Dato' Sri Arthur Joseph Kurup, Minister of Natural Resources and Environmental Sustainability
- Deputy Minister responsible: Syed Ibrahim Syed Noh, Deputy Minister of Natural Resources and Environmental Sustainability
- Ministry executive: Datuk Anis Rizana binti Mohd Zainudin, Secretary-General; Datuk Mas Rizal bin Mohd Hilmi, Deputy Secretary-General (Natural Resources); Datuk Nor Yahati bin Awang, Deputy Secretary-General (Environment Sustainability); Mohd Azman bin Hj Mohd Ariffin, Senior Under-Secretary (Management)
- Website: www.nres.gov.my

Footnotes
- Ministry of Natural Resources and Environmental Sustainability on Facebook

The Ministry of Natural Resources and Environmental Sustainability (Malay: Kementerian Sumber Asli dan Kelestarian Alam), abbreviated NRES, is a ministry of the Government of Malaysia that is responsible for natural resources, environment, climate change, land, mines, minerals, geoscience, biodiversity, wildlife, national parks, forestry, surveying, mapping and geospatial data.

== Organisation ==
- Minister of Natural Resources and Environmental Sustainability
  - Deputy Minister of Natural Resources and Environmental Sustainability
    - Secretary-General
      - Under the Authority of Secretary-General
        - Internal Audit Unit
        - Legal Advisory Unit
        - Corporate Communication Unit
        - Integrity Unit
        - Key Performance Indicator Unit
        - Strategic Planning and International Division
      - Deputy Secretary-General (Natural Resources)
        - Land, Survey and Geospatial Division
        - Minerals and Geoscience Division
        - Biodiversity Management dan Forestry Division
        - REDD Plus Unit
      - Deputy Secretary-General (Energy)
        - Energy Supply Division
        - Sustainable Energy Division
      - Senior Under-Secretary (Management Services)
        - Administration and Finance Division
        - Information Management Division
        - Human Resources Management Division
        - Development Division
        - Account Division

=== Federal departments ===
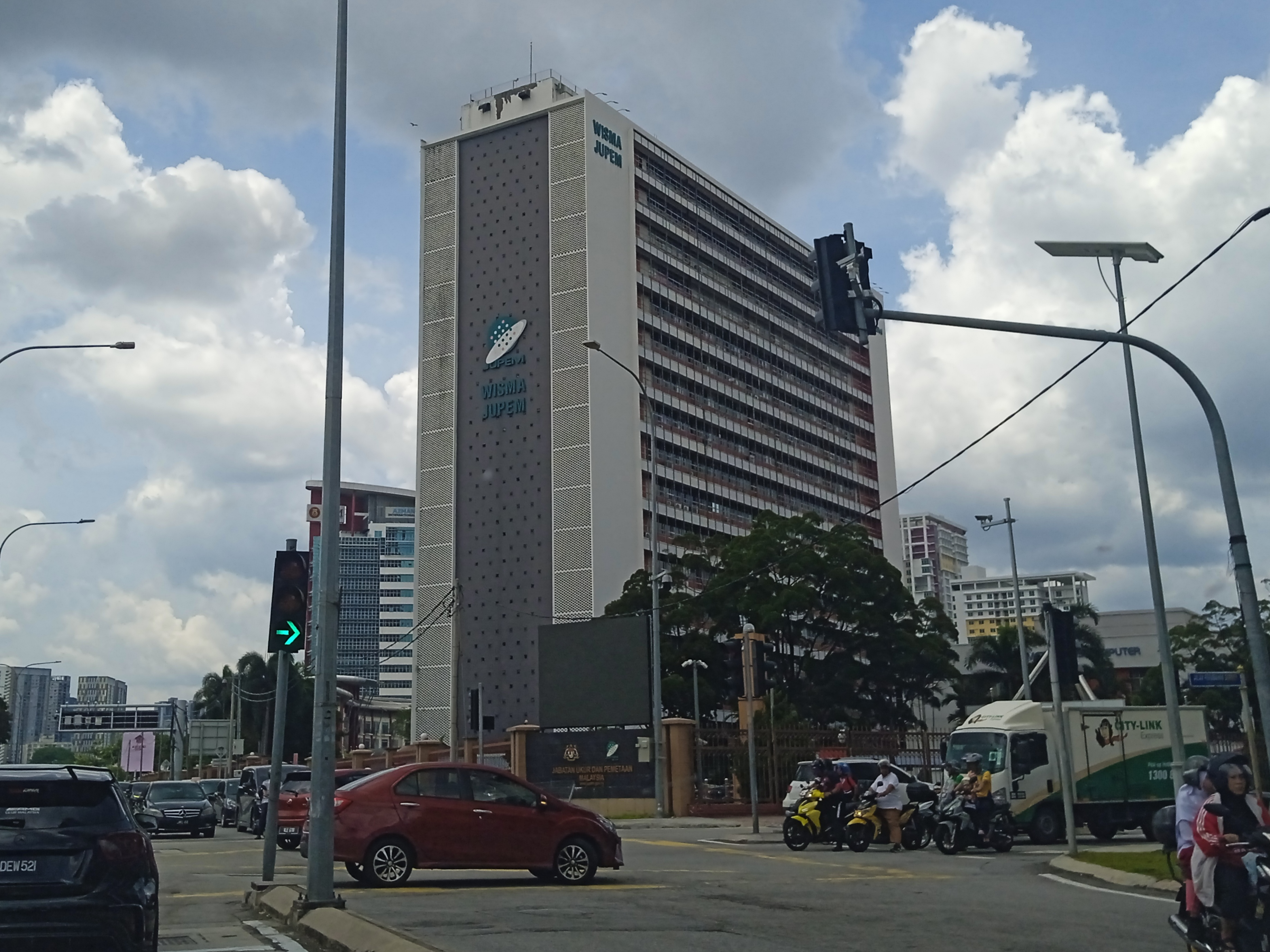
Department of Survey and Mapping Malaysia

1. Department of Director General of Lands and Mines (Federal), or Jabatan Ketua Pengarah Tanah dan Galian Persekutuan (JKPTG). (Official site)
2. Department of Survey and Mapping Malaysia, or Jabatan Ukur dan Pemetaan Malaysia (JUPEM). (Official site)
3. Department of Minerals and Geoscience Malaysia, or Jabatan Mineral dan Geosains Malaysia (JMG). (Official site)
4. Forestry Department of Peninsular Malaysia, or Jabatan Perhutanan Semenanjung Malaysia (JPSM). (Official site)
5. Department of Wildlife and National Parks Peninsular Malaysia, or Jabatan Perlindungan Hidupan Liar Dan Taman Negara Semenanjung Malaysia (PERHILITAN). (Official site)
6. National Institute of Land and Survey, or Institut Tanah dan Ukur Negara (INSTUN). (Official site)
7. Department of Environment (DOE), or Jabatan Alam Sekitar (JAS). (Official site)
8. Malaysian Meteorological Department, or Jabatan Meteorologi Malaysia (METMalaysia). (Official site)

=== Statutory Bodies ===
1. Forest Research Institute Malaysia (FRIM), or Institut Penyelidikan Perhutanan Malaysia. (Official site)
2. Sustainable Energy Development Authority (SEDA) Malaysia, or Pihak Berkuasa Pembangunan Tenaga Lestari Malaysia (SEDA). (Official site)
3. The Tin Industry (Research And Development) Board, or Lembaga (Penyelidikan & Kemajuan) Perusahaan Timah. (Official site)

=== Professional Institutions ===
1. Board of Geologists Malaysia (BoG), or Lembaga Ahli Geologi. (Official site)
2. Land Surveyors Board Peninsular Malaysia, or Lembaga Juruukur Tanah. (site)

== Key legislation ==
The Ministry of Natural Resources, Environment and Climate Change is responsible for administration of several key Acts:

Lands

- Continental Shelf Act 1966 [Act 83]
- Small Estates (Distribution) Act 1955 [Act 98]
- Aboriginal Peoples Act 1954 [Act 134]
- Strata Titles Act 1985 [Act 318]
- Federal Lands Commissioner Act 1957 [Act 349]
- Stamp Act 1949 [Act 378]
- Land Conservation Act 1960 [Act 385]
- Interpretation Acts 1948 and 1967 (Consolidated and Revised 1989) [Act 388]
- Land Acquisition Act 1960 [Act 486]
- Padi Cultivators (Control of Rent and Security of Tenure) Act 1967 [Act 528]
- Land (Group Settlement Areas) Act 1960 [Act 530]
- National Land Code (Validation) Act 2003 [Act 625]

Minerals and Geoscience

- Geological Survey Act 1974 [Act 129]
- Mineral Development Act 1994 [Act 525]

Forestry

- National Forestry Act 1984 [Act 313]
- Wood-based Industries (State Legislatures Competency) Act 1984 [Act 314]
- Malaysian Forestry Research and Development Board Act 1985 [Act 319]
- International Trade in Endangered Species Act 2008 [Act 686]

Biodiversity

- Access to Biological Resources and Benefit Sharing Act 2017 [Act 795]
- National Parks Act 1980 [Act 226]
- Fisheries Act 1985 [Act 317]
- Fees (Marine Parks Malaysia) (Validation) Act 2004 [Act 635]
- Biosafety Act 2007 [Act 678]
- Wildlife Conservation Act 2010 [Act 716]

Environment

- Environmental Quality Act 1974 [Act 127]
- Exclusive Economic Zone Act 1984 [Act 311]

Water

- Drainage Works Act 1954 [Act 354]
- Waters Act 1920 [Act 418]
- Water Supply (Federal Territory of Kuala Lumpur) Act 1998 [Act 581]
- Water Services Industry Act 2006 [Act 655]

== Policy Priorities of the Government of the Day ==
- National Water Resources Policy
- National Mineral Policy
- National Forestry Policy
- National Biodiversity Policy
- National Biological Diversity 2016-2025

== Ministers ==
| Minister | Portrait | Office | Executive Experience |
|---|---|---|---|
| Arthur Joseph Kurup | | Minister of Natural Resources and Environmental Sustainability | MP for Pensiangan (May 2018 – current); Deputy Minister in the Prime Minister's Department (March 2020 – August 2021); Deputy Minister of Works (August 2021 – November 2022); Deputy Minister of Science, Technology and Innovation (December 2022 – December 2023); Deputy Minister of Agriculture and Food Security (December 2023 – December 2025); MLA for Sook (November 2025 – current) |
| Syed Ibrahim Syed Noh | | Deputy Minister of Natural Resources and Environmental Sustainability | MP for Ledang (May 2018 – current) |

== See also ==
- Minister of Natural Resources, Environment and Climate Change (Malaysia)
