= 2014–2015 Malaysian floods =

Meteorological history
- Duration: 15 December 2014 – 3 January 2015

Overall effects
- Fatalities: 21
- Damage: $560 million (USD 2016)
- Areas affected: Johor, Kedah, Kelantan, Negeri Sembilan, Pahang, Perak, Perlis, Sabah, Sarawak, Selangor and Terengganu (Mostly in the East Coast and northern region of Peninsular Malaysia)

The 2014–2015 Malaysian floods affected Malaysia from 15 December 2014 – 3 January 2015. More than 500,000 people were affected in Malaysia. Kelantan was the highest affected with 354,800 while 21 were killed. These floods have been described as the worst in decades.

== Affected areas ==
As part of the northeast monsoon, heavy rains since 17 December forced 3,390 people in Kelantan and 4,209 people in Terengganu to flee their homes. Several Keretapi Tanah Melayu (KTM) intercity train services along the East Coast route were disrupted on 18 December following the floods. On 20 December, the area of Kajang, Selangor, was also hit by serious floods. By 23 December, most rivers in Kelantan, Pahang, Perak and Terengganu had reached dangerous levels. Due to rising water levels, most businesses were affected and about 60,000 people were evacuated the following day. The state of Kelantan had the most evacuees (20,468 to 24,765), followed by Terengganu (21,606), Pahang (10,825), Perak (1,030), Sabah (336) and Perlis (143).

The situation continues to worsen in Kelantan and Terengganu, due to heavy rain. Most roads in Kelantan have been closed. The worst-hit district in Terengganu is Kemaman, followed by Dungun, Kuala Terengganu, Hulu Terengganu, Besut and Marang. In Pahang, the worst-hit areas are Kuantan, Maran, Jerantut, Lipis and Pekan. Dozens of foreign tourists were stranded at a resort in a Malaysian national park in Pahang. Most were travellers from Canada, Britain, Australia and Romania. All were rescued via boat and helicopter. In Kedah, at least 51 people were evacuated. A teenager in Perlis was the first victim to die in this flood.

In southern Malaysia, between 300 and 350 people have been displaced in both Johor and Negeri Sembilan. The number of evacuees nationwide reached more than 200,000 by 28 December, with 10 people killed. The flooding is considered the country's worst in decades. However, the exact numbers of evacuees, missing persons and deaths are unknown, as the Malaysian flood centre was unable to provide any accurate figures. Some victim were found in miserable condition as the victim had to survive on one meal of rice a day after he was stranded in the floods. On 31 December, a Royal Malaysia Police Ecureuill AS 355F2 helicopter crashed during a patrol in Kelantan, injuring four crews on board.

In Sabah, heavy rains since 21 December resulted in flooding throughout most areas in the district of Beaufort. As many as 30 villages were severely affected due to the water level of Padas River rising up to 9.26 metres above the danger level, with the floods caused mainly by the overflow of water from the river's upper reaches in the Tenom district. About 292 people were evacuated as the flood situation worsened in Beaufort, while the condition improved in the interior districts of Tenom and Kemabong. The number of victims increased to 300 overnight. Most victims in Tenom were able to return home, with only one of the eleven flood relief centres still operational as water levels receded. However, more relief centres are expected to be opened if the rain continues and the water from upper Tenom and Keningau flood the Padas River. In Kudat, 9 families comprising 63 people were affected by floods and have sought shelter at relatives' and neighbours' houses. In Sarawak, several villages in upper Baram hit by floods on 29 December.

As of 2 January 2015, floodwaters continued to recede and the number of evacuees in Kelantan, Terengganu, Pahang and Perak continued to reduce while the state of Sabah once again prepared for rising numbers of evacuees as floodwaters has started to rise in Kota Belud. Over 1,000 people been evacuated in northern Sabah during the floods. On 3 January, the area of south-western Sipitang district was flooded while floods in the northern Sabah including Kota Belud, Kota Marudu and Pitas had receded. In Tawau, three primary schools were also affected by floods but the waters began to recede at the afternoon.

== Effects ==
=== Healthcare ===
As of 29 December, the flooding has affected 102 health facilities in West Malaysia, 38 of which are still operating. An anaesthesiologist working in Kelantan's Kuala Krai Hospital had to intubate a baby in the dark after a diesel generator ran out of fuel. Helicopters were used to evacuate patients from Kuala Krai Hospital as the flood worsened. The 180 hospital staffs have been working tirelessly for over 5 days. The hospital also doubled as a temporary relief centre for flood victims. Universiti Sains Malaysia Hospital (HUSM) in Kubang Kerian, Kelantan, experienced a blood shortage due to overwhelming life-saving demands. Medical students were mobilised to assist medical officers on duty at HUSM.

=== Education ===
Three universities namely Universiti Malaysia Kelantan (UMK), Universiti Malaysia Terengganu (UMT), and Universiti Sultan Zainal Abidin (UniSZA) were affected by floods. Students of UMK decided to flee from their university in view of worsening flood crisis. Such affected universities will be allowed to defer their examinations scheduled in early January 2015. In the meantime, Universiti Sains Malaysia (USM) Penang campus have been urging its Kelantan students to return to their campus earlier to avoid being trapped by floods. As of 28 December 2014, a total of 340 schools in Malaysia have either been converted into flood relief centres or flooded by waters. The Ministry of Education Malaysia announced that opening of all primary and secondary schools will be delayed by 1 week. This is to ensure that all schools are clean and safe for the students before the opening day.

=== Economy ===
Palm oil and rubber prices have surged as flooding has disrupted supplies from Malaysia. Rubber output in Thailand and Malaysia will drop at least 30 per cent and prices been predicted to rise further. As floodwaters in Malaysia are not receding, palm oil production decline sharply.

=== General ===
Shortage of food supplies, electricity, clean water, banking services and erratic communication problems continue to affect flood victims after the flood started to recede. Lack of banking services has caused some petrol stations to run out of small change. Some victims survived on donated relief items while other desperate flood victims started to fight for or steal food and valuables from abandoned homes. One mother was forced to feed her 6 months old infant with formula milk mixed with rainwater. However, flood victims still have rice, bread, canned sardines and egg for dinner at a relief centre. Some unregistered flood victims claimed that they were denied help from NGOs when they tried to stop the NGOs at the side of the road. Tissue papers drenched in cooking oil was used to provide light when there was no electricity or candles supplies.

Some flood victims were worried of that their valuables were being stolen from their homes and they have to swim back to their homes every day to check on their items. Prices of essential items were artificially raised. For example, one bottle of water costs MYR5, one large candle costs MYR14, l.5 litres of petrol costs MYR12, and one can of sardines costs MYR8. Some boat owners charged MYR5 for crossing Pahang River and MYR15 for longer journeys. Nevertheless, some quarters argued that the flood has united all Malaysians together to help each other regardless of race, religion, or political stance.

Many flood victims in Kelantan, Malaysia, started to cross Golok River into Su-ngai Kolok town to buy essential items at Su-ngai Kolok Municipality Market.

== Response ==
=== Local ===
Malaysia — The Malaysian government mobilised all available assets to help in flood rescue operations, the number of rescue team members was increased. Prime Minister Najib Razak said that an additional MYR500 million had been allocated for the state of Sabah. The Prime Minister also brought forward the payment of 1Malaysia People's Aid (BR1M) and special schooling aid of MYR100 to mid-January in order to ease the burden of flood victims. He also said that flood mitigation improvements will be given a priority in the Eleven Malaysia Plan (2016–2020) to prevent such disaster from recurring as existing flood mitigation systems were unable to cope with the extent of floods that struck several states.

The state of Malacca sent around MYR500,000, both the state of Penang and Selangor allocated around MYR1.5 million, the state of Sarawak delivered about MYR2 million, while the state of Terengganu while being itself affected by the floods has donated another MYR1 million. As a mark of respect for all flood victims nationwide, most New Year celebration concerts, including those in Pahang, Perak, Sabah, Selangor and Terengganu, were cancelled. The state of Malacca decided to celebrate the New Year in a simple way and cancelled most of its events.

The Malaysian bank Maybank has offered a six-month moratorium on loan instalment payments and waiver of certain charges on a case-by-case basis for customers affected by the floods in the country. The bank also has assisted flood victims through a recent partnership between the Maybank Foundation and Mercy Malaysia. Johor FA has announced a contribution of MYR100,000 to assist the growing number of flood victims on the East Coast. Various non-governmental organisations have contributed their assistance.

=== International ===
China — The Chinese government donated around US$100,000 (MYR339,160) to the Malaysian Red Crescent Society (MCRS). Chinese ambassador to Malaysia Huang Huikang said that the Chinese government is "concerned for its Malaysian brothers who are affected by the floods. China wishes to stand by Malaysia and we will not allow Malaysians to face such challenges alone". He added that China promised to provide as much relief assistance to Malaysia as possible. Another MYR10 million (US$3.76 million) been sent to Malaysia in the form of items such as 1,600 makeshift tents, generators, sewage pumps and water purifying equipment.

Iran — Iran's Cultural Office in Kuala Lumpur has expressed sympathy with flood-stricken people in Malaysia's northeastern states. In a statement by Ali Akbar Ziaei, he wished "rapid health recovery for the wounded and divine forgiveness for the dead".

Japan — The Japanese government, via the Japan International Cooperation Agency (Jica), has pledged emergency relief aid worth over MYR500,000 in the form of items such as generators, water purifiers and other humanitarian goods. In a statement on their embassy in Malaysia, "the government of Japan expressed sympathy to the people of Malaysia over the massive flooding that forced a huge number of people in the affected areas to be evacuated and ready to offer and provide immediate emergency relief facilities and equipment including generators, water purifiers and other humanitarian goods via Jica. Adding the Japanese government always stands ready to assist Malaysia in such tragic circumstances and earnestly hopes that the Malaysian government and its people will face the adversity with courage". The Japanese government also has offer an additional assistance worth around MYR300,000 along with other items such as tents and blankets.

Singapore — The Singaporean government has pledged S$100,000 for flood victims in Malaysia. The Singaporean Ministry of Foreign Affairs (MFA) announced in a statement that the money will be channelled to flood victims by the Singapore Red Cross (SRC), with an additional S$127,000 to be channelled from the Singapore Disaster Response Emergency Fund. An additional MYR600,000 (S$227,000) was given to the Malaysian Red Crescent Society (MRCS) on 30 December. Water purification units were sent to ensure that affected residents have clean drinking water.

All mosques in Singapore has organising a special fund to aid flood victims in neighbouring Malaysia, while localised non-profits such as the Tzu Chi Singapore also partook in fundraising efforts.

Taiwan — Taiwanese medical workers and volunteers with 12 vehicles loaded with supplies and rescue equipment entered flood-hit areas in Malaysia and offer relief services to victims. Taiwan economic and cultural centre office has donated MYR5,000 (US$1,429) to help flood victims.

Taiwan Buddhist Tzu Chi Foundation founder Dharma Master Cheng Yan has donated MYR350,000 of vegetarian instant rice to flood victims.

Thailand — Thai authorities provide relief aid and assistance to Malaysian people who living along the border of Narathiwat Province. Narathiwat governor Natthapong Sirichana also took staff into affected areas to offer aid supplies to people struggling with severe floods in Malaysia. Other than Narathiwat, authorities in Pattani, Yala and Songhla Provinces along with Thai Army have gathering donations and volunteers to help the Malaysian state of Kelantan as ordered by Thai Prime Minister Prayut Chan-o-cha.

United Arab Emirates — Sheikh Hamdan Bin Zayed Al Nahayan who is the President of the Emirates Red Crescent (ERC) has ordered that emergency aid be delivered to flood victims in Malaysia's north-eastern states of Kelantan, Terengganu and Pahang.

United States — United States Secretary of State John Kerry expressed sympathy to the flood victims in Malaysia and offered US disaster relief assistance for those affected. The United States provide around MYR525,000 to non-governmental organisations (NGOs) who help the flood victims, and offer other aid in the form of medical equipment and medicine. An additional of MYR3 million was sent in the form of materials, programmes and technical assistance. The United States government had also agreed to provide a long-term assistance to Malaysia on storm forecasting and flood mitigation.

United States companies and their employees had provided cash and in-kind donations valued at over MYR1.1 million.

=== International Non-Governmental Organisations (NGOs) ===
International Federation of Red Cross and Red Crescent Societies (IFRC) — Around CHF82,964 (approximately US$83,000) been delivered to Malaysia as part of the Disaster Relief Emergency Fund (DREF) to support 25,000 (5,000 families) for a period of one month. The DREF will fund the distribution of 10,000 blankets for 5,000 families as part of the overall operation.

Islamic Relief — The organisation focused distributing aid on Rantau Panjang town as the area at present has little support from non-governmental organisations.

ShelterBox — Helston based disaster relief charity is on their way to Malaysia to start assessing on what type of shelter is needed and determining the best aid method. On 30 December, the charity arrived and started to distributes aid by stocked 224 ShelterBoxes and 1,032 Midi tents.

== Controversies ==
As Malaysian Prime Minister Najib Razak was away, his deputy, Muhyiddin Yassin, was in charge for the flood crisis. However, the Prime Minister later ended his vacation amidst criticism from the public when he was seen playing golf with then US President Barack Obama in Hawaii, United States. Najib stressed that the golf game was necessary in establishing diplomatic ties with the United States and the event has been planned much earlier even before the flood started. Some victims have accused the government of being slow to provide assistance.

The Malaysian federal government was urged to declare a state of emergency in view of worsening floods. This measure is recommended in order to mobilise all the machinery of the government to tackle the flood situation. However, prime minister Najib decided that state of emergency is not needed because insurance companies will not be paying compensations to the victims as damages will be included in "force majeure" category. However, the opposition dismissed such explanation by Najib and insurance companies clarifies that as long as flood is covered in a policy, flood victims would be eligible for their claims.

Nik Muhammad Abduh, the son of PAS leader Nik Abdul Aziz Nik Mat, said that the flood is due to the wrath of Allah. Therefore, the Kelantan state government must enforce "hudud" law, despite widespread opposition against the law. However, the state assembly building where the state government is supposed to table a hudud law has been waterlogged since 25 December. This has caused the state government to postpone the special sitting to a later date. However, the state government was told to help flood victims first instead of focusing on the hudud issue. Muhammad V of Kelantan called for more environmentally friendly measures to prevent such flooding from happening again.

Rescue missions have been difficult, due to uncertain weather conditions and some residents' refusal to evacuate. A village head at Kampung Jimah, Lukut, Negeri Sembilan, attempted to chase away opposition representatives who sought to provide aid to victims' families. In another instance, opposition representatives were shooed away by local authorities when they attempted to provide aid at a relief centre in Kluang, Johor.

== See also ==
- 2015 East Malaysian floods
