= Wildlife of Malaysia =

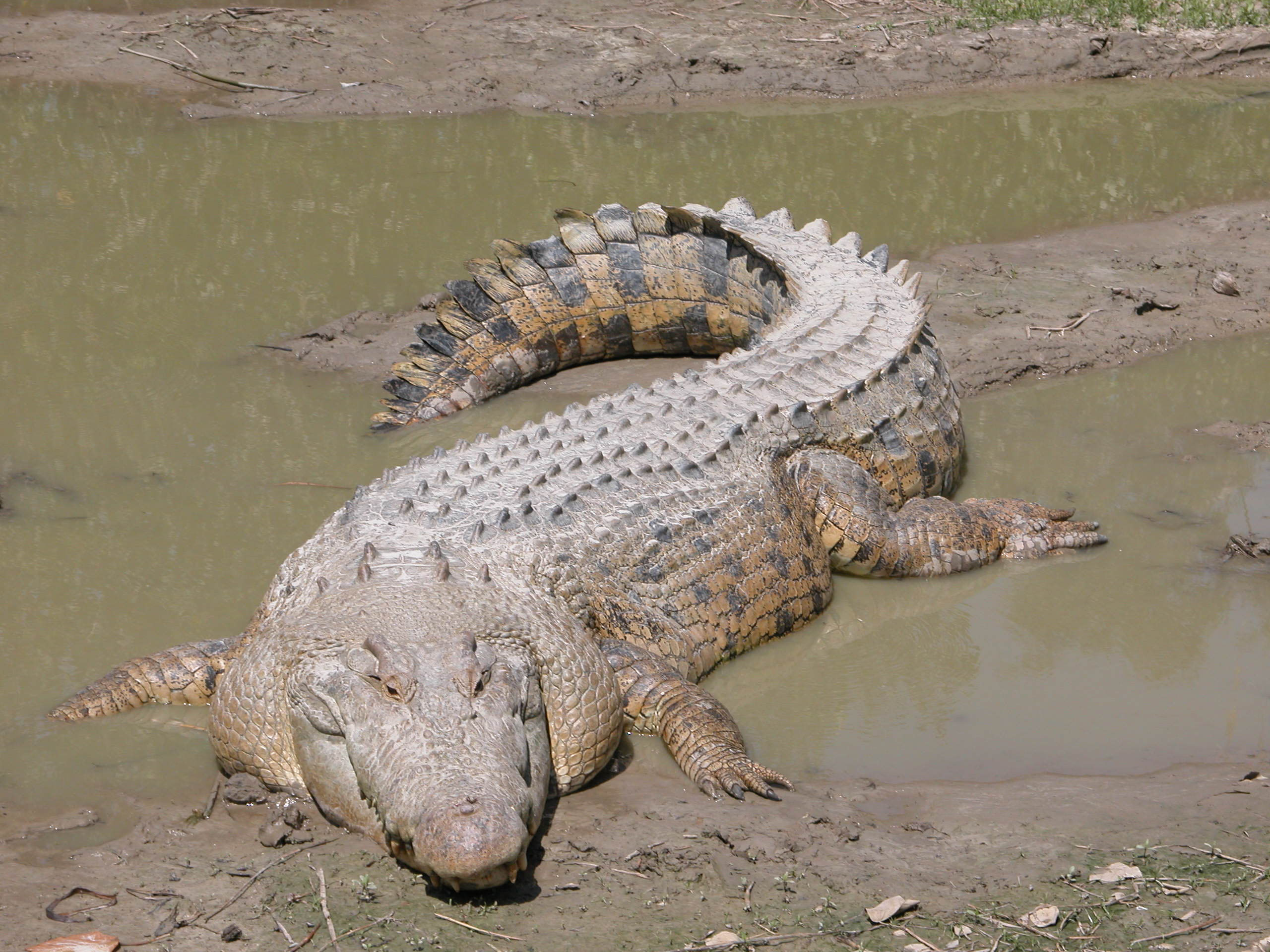
A saltwater crocodile.

The wildlife of Malaysia is diverse, with Malaysia being a megadiverse country. Most of the country is covered in rainforest, which hosts a huge diversity of plant and animal species. There are approximately 361 mammal species, 694 bird species, 250 reptile species, and 150 frog species found in Malaysia. Its large marine territory also holds a great diversity of life, with the country's coastal waters comprising part of the Coral Triangle.

== Terrestrial fauna ==
Malaysia is estimated to contain 20% of the world's animal species, and includes some of the most biodiverse areas on the planet. High levels of endemism are found in the diverse forests of Malaysian Borneo's mountains, as populations are isolated from each other by lowland forest.

=== Mammals ===
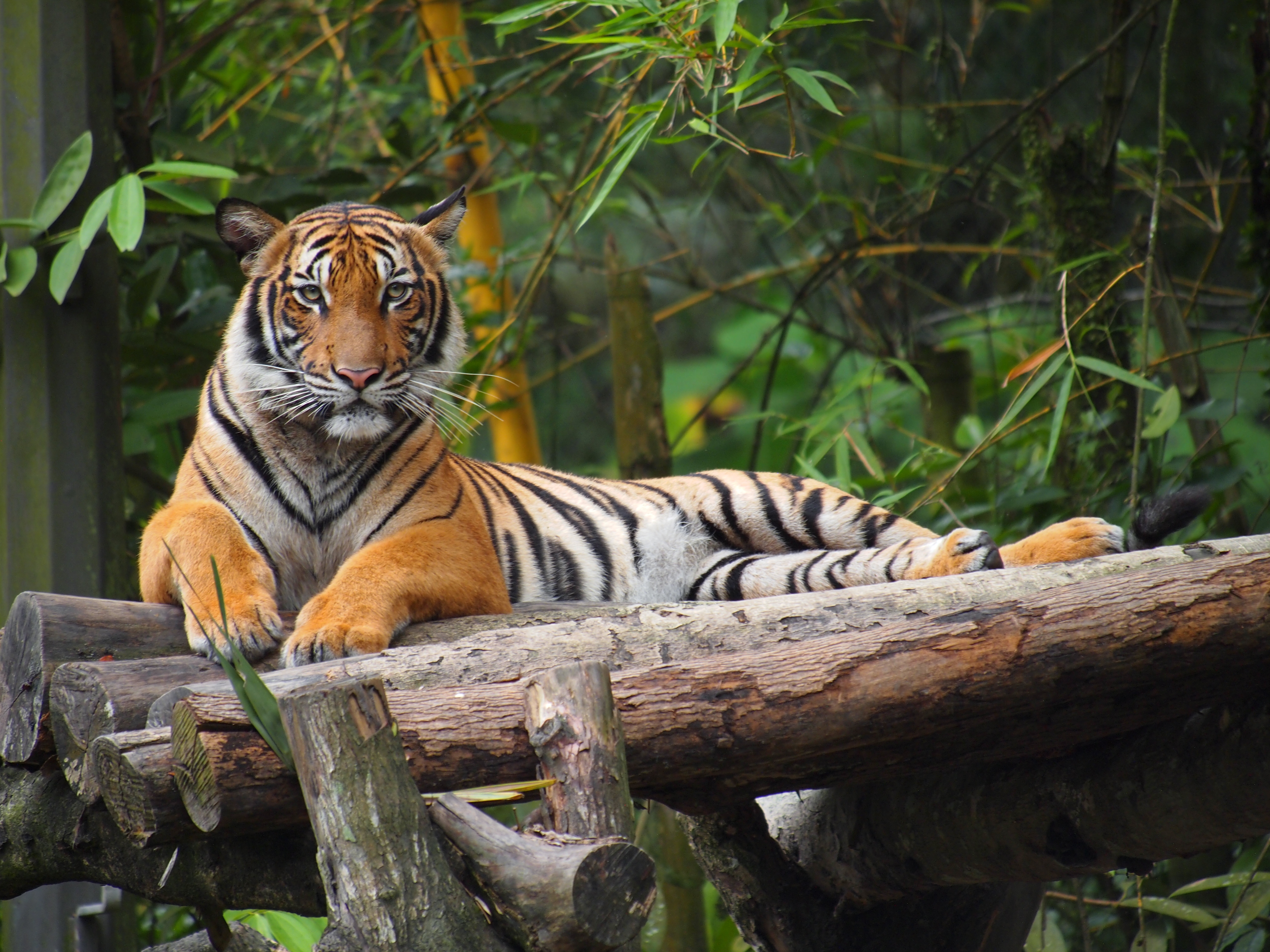
A Malayan tiger in the National Zoo of Malaysia

There are about 361 mammal species in Malaysia. Peninsular Malaysia holds four big cats: the Indochinese tiger, the Malayan tiger, the Indochinese leopard and also the clouded leopard. Another major predator is the sunbear. Large prey exists, such as the Sumatran rhinoceros, the Malayan tapir, mouse deer, barking deer, sambar deer, wild boar, and Bornean bearded pigs.

Gaurs and Asian elephants can also be found. Lowland animals such as these also can be found at higher altitudes, along with animals specialised for mountain living, such as siamang gibbons, red squirrels, and lesser moon rat species. East Malaysia lacks the tigers of the Peninsula, leaving Sunda clouded leopards, sunbears, and Sunda otter civet as the primary predators. Borneo elephants are also found there, along with Bornean orangutans, Mueller's gibbons, macaques, proboscis monkeys, silvered leaf monkeys, langurs, and slow lorises. Marbled cats and leopard cats are smaller predators.

Kinabalu ferret-badgers, Kinabalu black shrews, Hose's palm civets, and Brooke's tree squirrels are endemic to the mountains of Borneo. Other small mammals include mongooses and giant rats. 11,300 orangutans are found in East Malaysia. Other ape species include the white-handed gibbon and the siamang. Malaysia has 10 monkey species, divided between langurs and macaques. Proboscis monkeys, the world's largest monkey, are a langur species endemic to Borneo. Macaque species include the crab-eating macaque and the pig-tailed macaque.

The Malayan tiger, a close relative of the Indochinese tiger, is endemic to the Malay peninsula with a remaining population of about 300 (250-340). Small cats such as the bay cat and various civet cats are also found. 1200 Asian elephants exist on the Peninsula, with another population existing in East Malaysia. The world's largest cattle species, the seladang, is found in Malaysia. Fruit bats are also found throughout the country, with a high concentration in the Mulu Caves.

=== Birds ===
677 species of birds have been recorded just on the peninsula, with 794 recorded for the whole of Malaysia. A few are endemic to the mountains of the peninsula, such as the Malayan whistling-thrush. Bornean forests show high levels of endemism among bird species, with 38 species found nowhere else. Black-browed babblers and white-crowned shamas are found only in these forests. Large numbers of hornbills, woodpeckers, and pittas such as the mangrove pitta are also present.

Other species are found isolated on mountains, such as golden-naped barbets, spot-necked bulbuls, and mountain serpent-eagles. Bulbuls, starlings, and house swifts can be found in urban areas. Crested serpent-eagles and kingfishers can be found. There are ten species of hornbill in Malaysia, the most common of which is the Oriental pied hornbill. The largest Hornbill, as well as the rarest, is the helmeted hornbill, at 1.6 metres long. The rhinoceros hornbill is the national bird of the country, as well as the state bird of Sarawak. The fish eagle and brahminy kite are the most common birds of prey. Storm's stork and the Oriental darter can be found in wetlands.

=== Reptiles, amphibians and fish ===
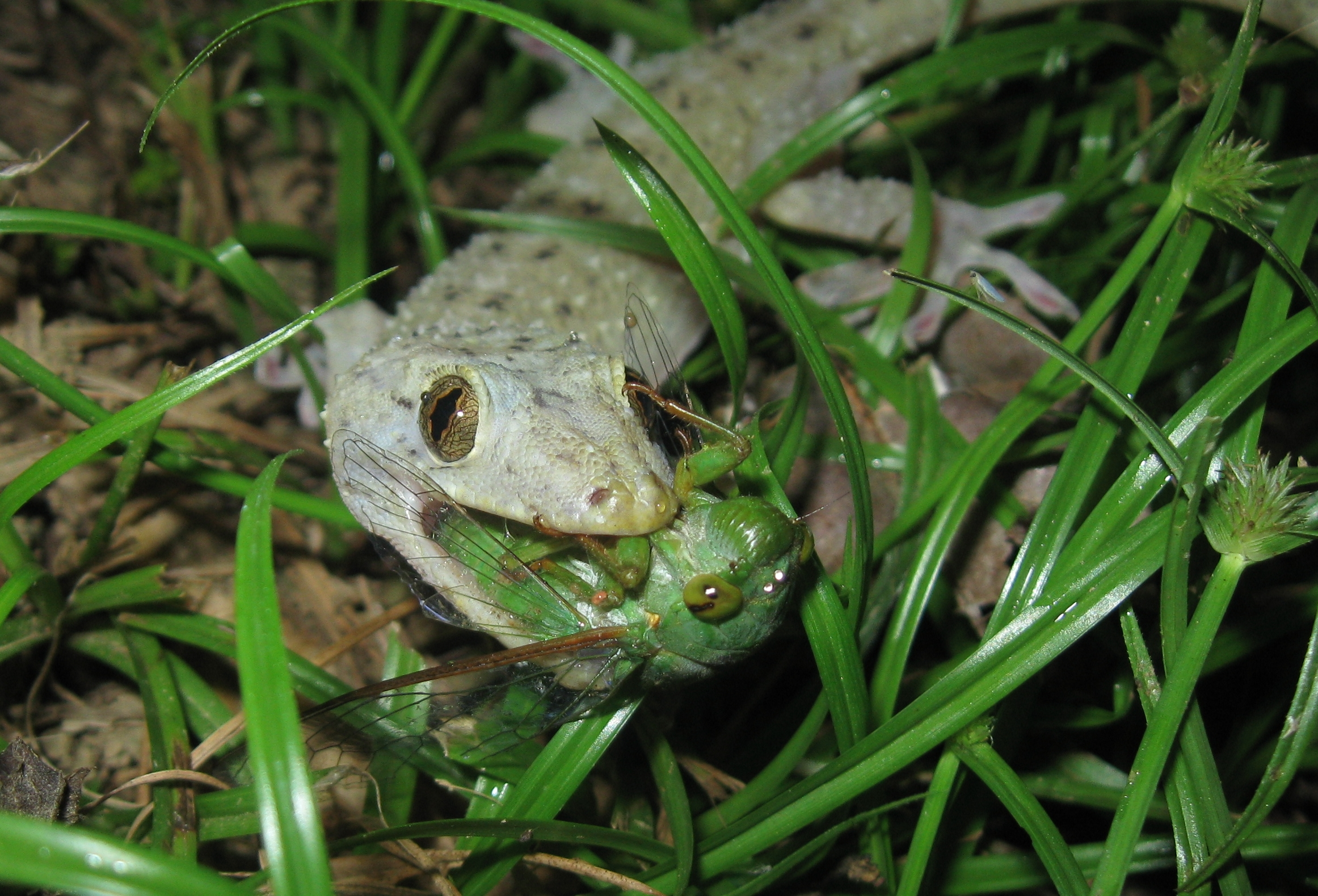
Hemidactylus frenatus

250 reptile species have been recorded, with about 150 species of snakes and 80 species of lizards. Only 16 of the land snakes are venomous. Notable among these are the Malayan pit viper, king cobras, Dumeril's monitors, Malay water monitors, and estuarine crocodiles. The king cobra is the deadliest snake found, but it is rarely encountered. The reticulated python is said to grow up to 10 metres (33 ft) in length. Monitor lizards, almost 2 metres (7 ft) in length, are found in both halves of the country.

Other snake species include the paradise tree snake and Wagler's pit viper. Estuarine crocodiles can grow up to 8.6 metres (28 ft) in length. Their smaller relative, the Malayan false gharial, can also be found. Flying lizards can also be found.

There are about 150 species of frog in Malaysia. Freshwater fish include the rare Asian arawana, along with marbled goby, harlequins, and tiger barbs.

=== Insects ===
Malaysia has thousands of insect species, with more being discovered every year. Butterfly species include Rajah Brooke's birdwing, while moth species include the Atlas moth. The largest beetle found is the rhinoceros beetle. Other large insects include the giant stick insect, which can grow as long as a human forearm, the empress cicada, with a wingspan of 30 centimetres (12 in), and the 4 centimetres (2 in) long giant ant. Other insects include banded hornets, fire ants, giant honey bees, and weaver ants. Many scorpions can also be found.

== Terrestrial flora ==
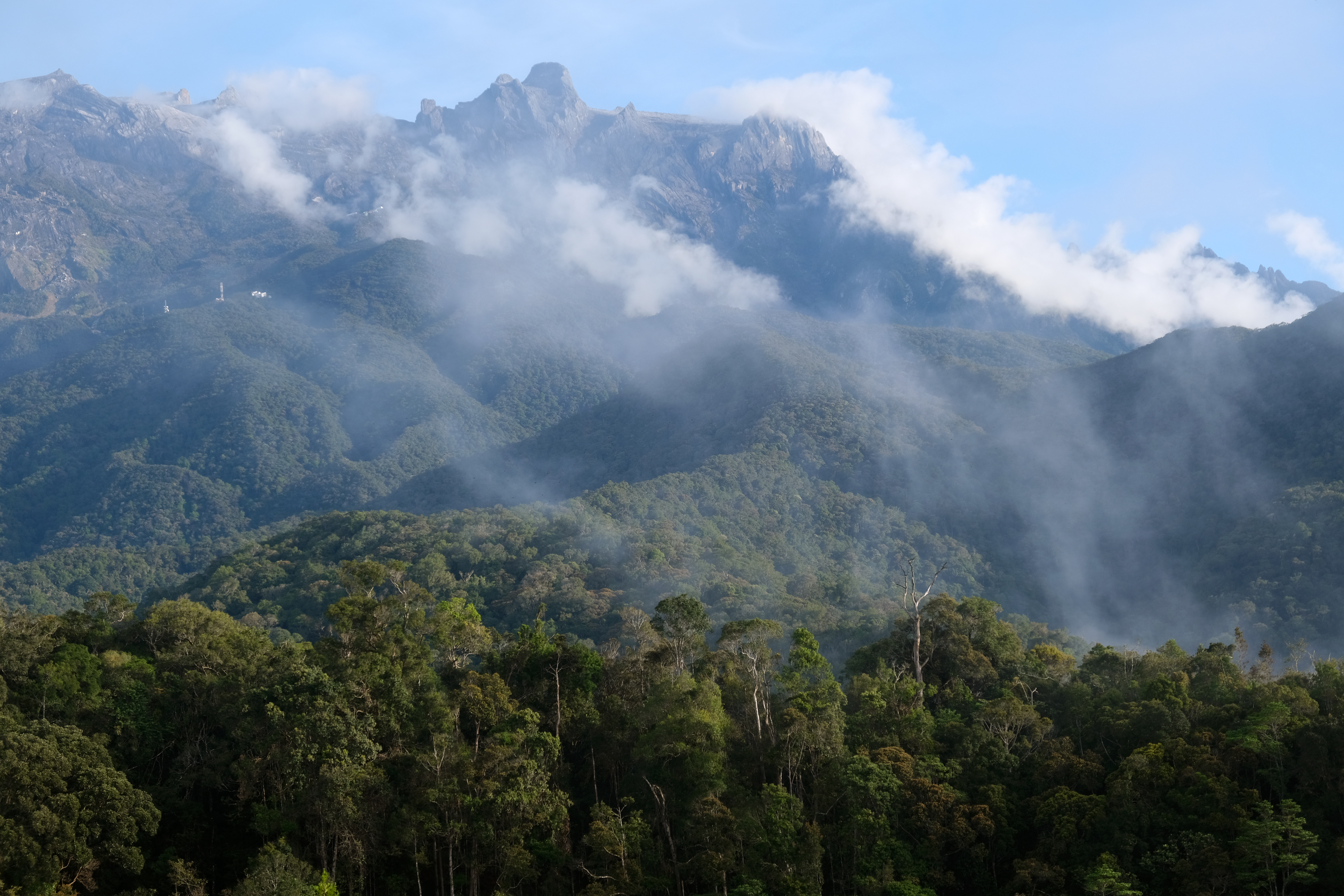
Mist forming in the Bornean rainforests

About two thirds of Malaysia is covered in forest which is believed to be 130 million years old. It is composed of a variety of types, although they are mainly dipterocarp forests. Dipterocarps can grow to about 50 metres (164 ft) tall. Lowland forest occurs below 760 metres (2,493 ft), and formerly East Malaysia was covered in such rainforest, which is supported by its hot wet climate. There are around 14,500 species of flowering plants and trees.

Besides rainforests, there are over 1,425 square kilometres (550 sq mi) of mangroves in Malaysia, and a large amount of peat forest. Coastal land of the peninsula is fringed by mangroves, which cause sediment build up resulting in peat bogs. These provide a base for plants that can tolerate the conditions. The peat forests of coastal Malaysia provide an important habitat for waterbirds and fish. The dipterocarps that occur in the peat forest obscure the ground, limiting ground vegetation. At higher altitudes, oaks, chestnuts, and rhododendrons replace dipterocarps.

There are an estimated 8,500 species of vascular plants in Peninsular Malaysia, with another 15,000 in the East. The forests of East Malaysia are estimated to be the habitat of around 2,000 tree species, and are one of the most biodiverse areas in the world, with 240 different species of trees every hectare. Further inland, heath forests are present. These forests host many members of the genus Rafflesia, the largest flowers in the world, with a maximum diameter of 1 metre (3 ft). They also contain large numbers of carnivorous plants, such as pitcher plants, bladderworts, sundews, and ant-house plants.

Some parts of the forest have shown promise for use in medicine. In 1990, a stand of trees showed promise to be able to be used to stop the spread of a strain of human immunodeficiency virus, but was cut down before more samples could be taken. Promise has been shown in fighting Malaria.

== Marine life ==
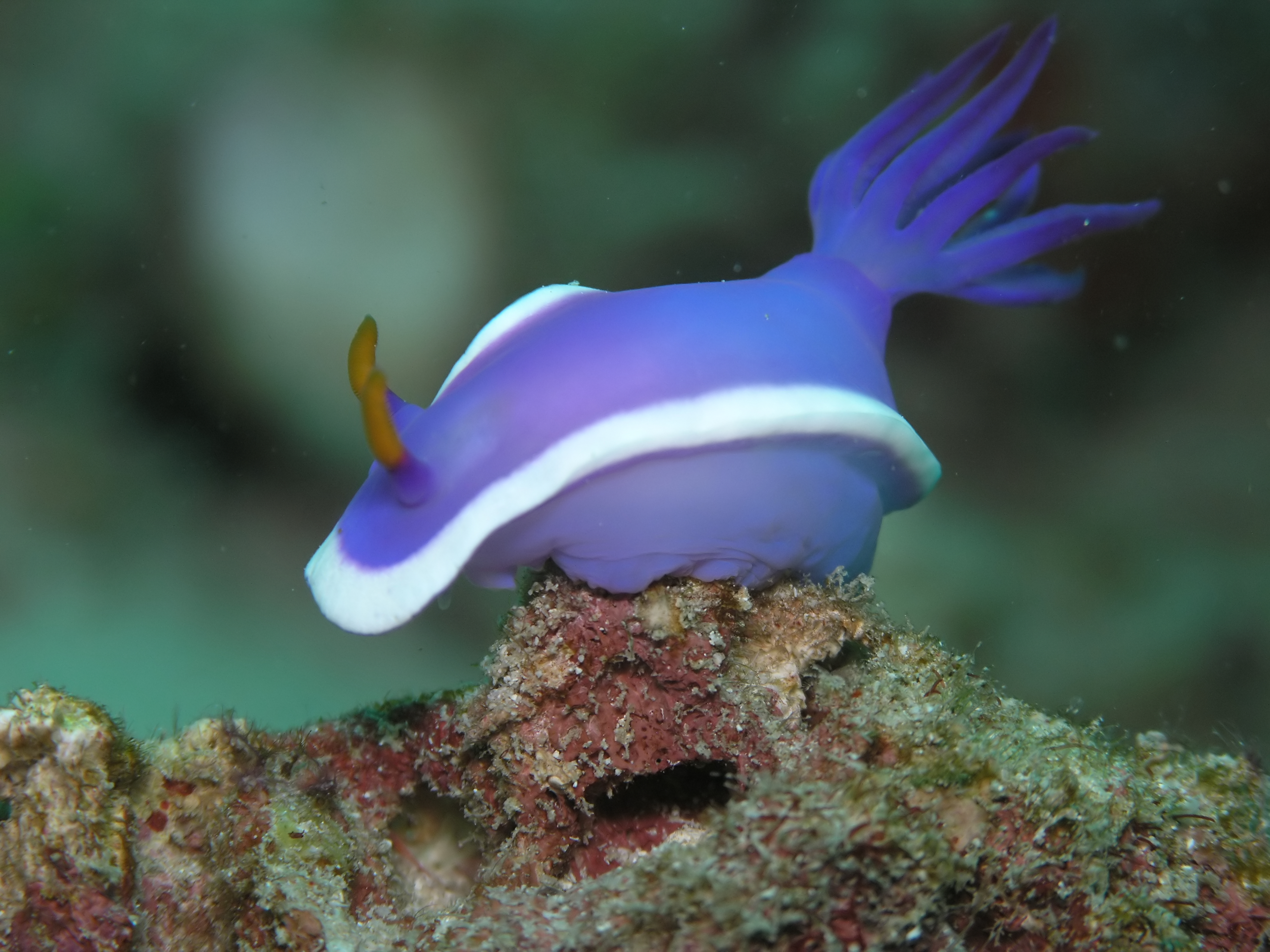
Hypselodoris bullocki off Sipadan

Malaysia's exclusive economic zone is 1.5 times larger than its land area, and some of its waters are in the Coral Triangle, a biodiversity hotspot. The waters around Sipadan island are the most biodiverse in the world. Bordering East Malaysia, the Sulu Sea is a biodiversity hotspot, with around 600 coral species and 1200 fish species. Five species of sea turtles inhabit the area, along with 20 species of sea snake. The dugong is found around Sabah and in the Strait of Johor.

Sharks present include whale sharks, hammerhead sharks, and reef sharks. Game fish such as the blue marlin and tuna are often found, along with reef fish such as barracuda, bigeye trevally, bump-head parrotfish, grouper, and scorpionfish. Manta rays can be found.

== Environmental issues and countermeasures ==
With Malaysia's wildlife being some of the most diverse on earth, and it being a megadiverse country, the Malaysian government is interested in protecting it. The government aims to balance economic growth with environmental protection, but has been accused of favouring "big business" over the environment. Smoke haze from Indonesia occasionally causes problems further north, and fires caused by forest burning in 1997 obscured large parts of Southeast Asia and Australasia in smog.

At current rates of forest lost, the rainforests will likely disappear within a generation. Over 80% of Sarawak has been cleared, and this clearing has caused animals traditionally in lowland forest to retreat into the upland rain forests inland. Logging and cultivation practices have devastated tree cover, causing severe environmental degradation in the country. Floods in East Malaysia have been worsened by the loss of trees, and over 60% of the peninsula's forest has been cleared. With current rates of deforestation, the forests are predicted to be extinct by 2020. From 2000 to 2019, Sabah lost 1.60Mha, or 24%, of its tree cover. 51% of this loss came from Tongod, Beluran, Tawau, and Kinabatangan. In the same period, Sarawak lost 2.96Mha or 25% of its tree cover. Together, they made up 56% of Malaysia's 8.12Mha (28%) loss in tree cover during that period.

Deforestation is a major problem for fauna such as tigers, as the forest is cut to make room for plantations, mostly for palm oil and other cash crops. The orangutan population has dropped by 40% in the last 20 years. Hunting has also been an issue. Animals such as the Asian elephant have been forced out of their habitat due to its loss, often leading them to starve. Once so common that complaints existed of them trampling people's gardens, Sumatran rhinoceroses became extinct in Malaysia in 2019. Hornbills are steadily declining in numbers. Most remaining forest is found inside national parks.

Habitat destruction has proved a threat for marine life. Illegal fishing is another major threat. In Sabah alone, almost 3000 turtles are killed as by-catch per year. Illegal fishing methods such as dynamite fishing and poisoning have also depleted marine ecosystems. Leatherback turtle numbers have dropped by 98% since the 1950s. Turtle eggs are considered an aphrodisiac and remain a local delicacy, selling for around USD12 for 10. However, some communities that once regularly consumed turtle eggs now protect them, with hatching turtles becoming an ecotourism draw. Terengganu outlaws the sale of leatherback turtle eggs. While licensed collection and sale of the eggs from other species is still legal, the state has pledged to extend the ban on sale to all turtle species.

Climate change has reduced the number of male turtles being born in Peninsular Malaysia, perhaps to zero.

Overconsumption and the use of animal parts for profit has also endangered marine life, as well as tigers, whose meat can be found in restaurants in Kuala Lumpur. Tigers received official protection in 1976, when they numbered a mere 300. Marine life is also detrimentally affected by uncontrolled tourism. Shoreline erosion in places has reached 10 metres (33 ft) a year.

Pollution was the impetus for the creation of the Environmental Quality Act in 1974. Pollution has continued to increase, and punishment for violations has been limited in comparison to other crimes. In 2020, illegal chemical dumping into the water system caused water cuts to households in the Klang Valley, in which the capital Kuala Lumpur is situated.

Most environmental regulation falls under the control of the states. Some state governments are now trying to counter the environmental impact and pollution created by deforestation; Sabah has developed sustainable forest reserves, and the government is trying to cut logging by 10% per year. 28 national parks have been created, the first in 1938 by the British. There are 23 on East Malaysia and 7 on the Peninsula. The Malaysian government is also trying to preserve marine life, creating a joint project with Indonesia and the Philippines to look after the Sulu Sea, as well as limiting tourism in areas such as Sipadan Island. Marine parks have banned fishing and motorised sports. To counter coastal erosion, the Ministry of Science, Technology and Innovation has installed artificial reefs around the country's shores. These reefs are also intended to revive marine ecosystems. Animal trafficking is a large issue, and the Malaysian government is holding talks with the governments of Brunei and Indonesia to standardise anti-trafficking laws. The government aims to double the wild tiger population by 2020.

== See also ==
- List of mammals of Malaysia
- Environment of Malaysia
- Biodiversity of Borneo
