= Malaysian Meteorological Department =

Meteorological service of Malaysia

- Jabatan Meteorologi Malaysia
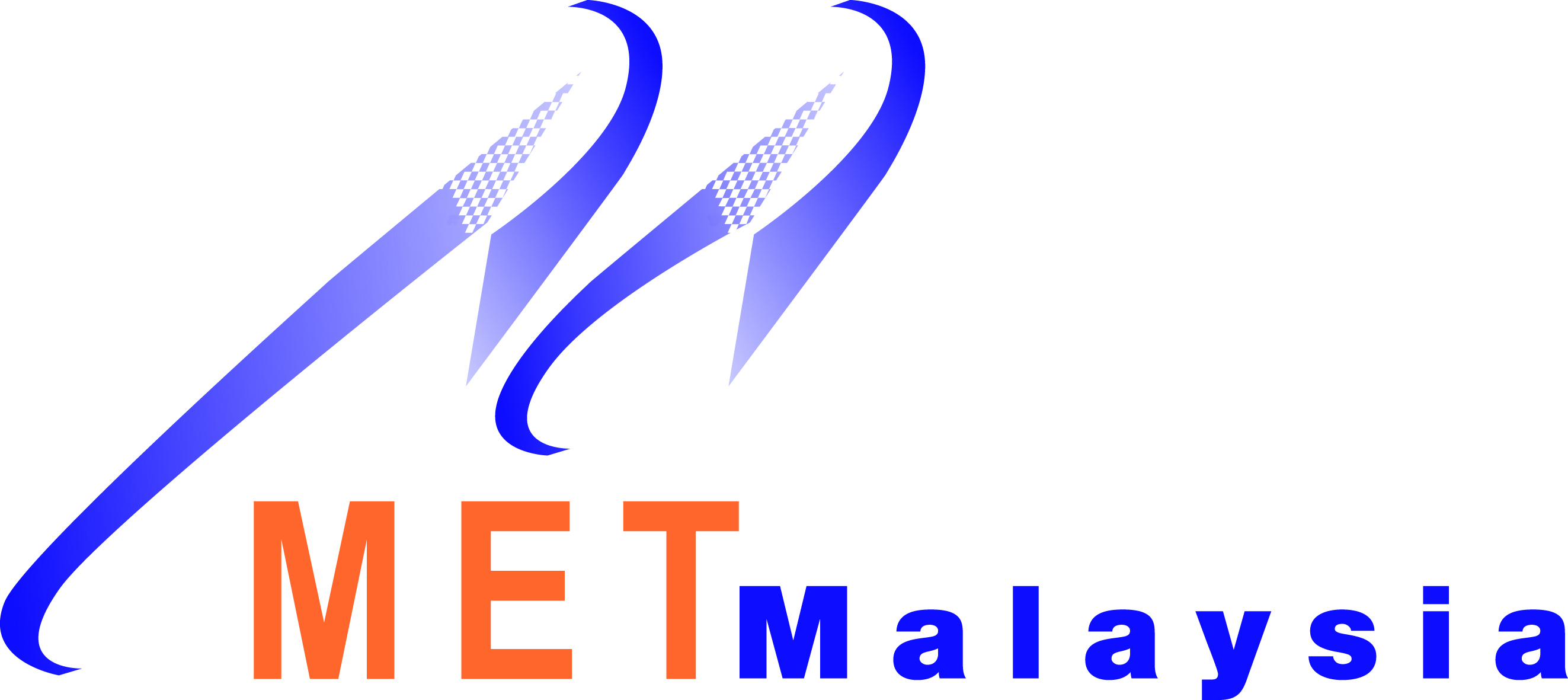
- The official logo of MET Malaysia

Agency overview
- Formed: 1 September 1946; 79 years ago
- Preceding agencies: Singapore Observation Station (1820); Malayan Meteorological Service (1946); Malaysian Meteorological Service (1965)
- Jurisdiction: Federal Government of Malaysia
- Headquarters: Petaling Jaya, Selangor, Malaysia; 3°06′N 101°39′E
- Parent department: Ministry of Natural Resources and Environmental Sustainability (NRES)
- Website: https://www.met.gov.my/

The Malaysian Meteorological Department (Malay: Jabatan Meteorologi Malaysia; abbreviated as MET Malaysia) is an agency under the Ministry of Natural Resources and Environmental Sustainability (NRES) which is responsible to provide various meteorological, climate and geophysical services to meet the needs of the nation in meteorological, climate and geophysical services for well-being, safety and sustainable development. METMalaysia is responsible for monitoring the onshore, sea and air weather conditions continuously throughout the country. In addition, METMalaysia issues forecasts, advice, weather and ocean alerts and climate surveys to reduce disaster risk. METMalaysia also provides aviation meteorological services to launch aircraft operations and geophysical services to detect earthquakes and tsunami warnings for Malaysia.

== Vision ==
To become a leading agency in meteorology, climatology and geophysics.

== Mission ==
To provide efficient and effective meteorological, climatological and geophysics services for the well-being, safety and sustainable development in order to meet the national and international needs.

== Strategic thrust ==
- Improve the effectiveness of weather services to reduce disaster risk
- Strengthen flight meteorological services to ensure flight safety and well-being
- Empower earthquake and tsunami services to reduce the risk of earthquake and tsunami disaster
- Strengthen climate service for national prosperity
- Empower human capital development

== Organisation ==
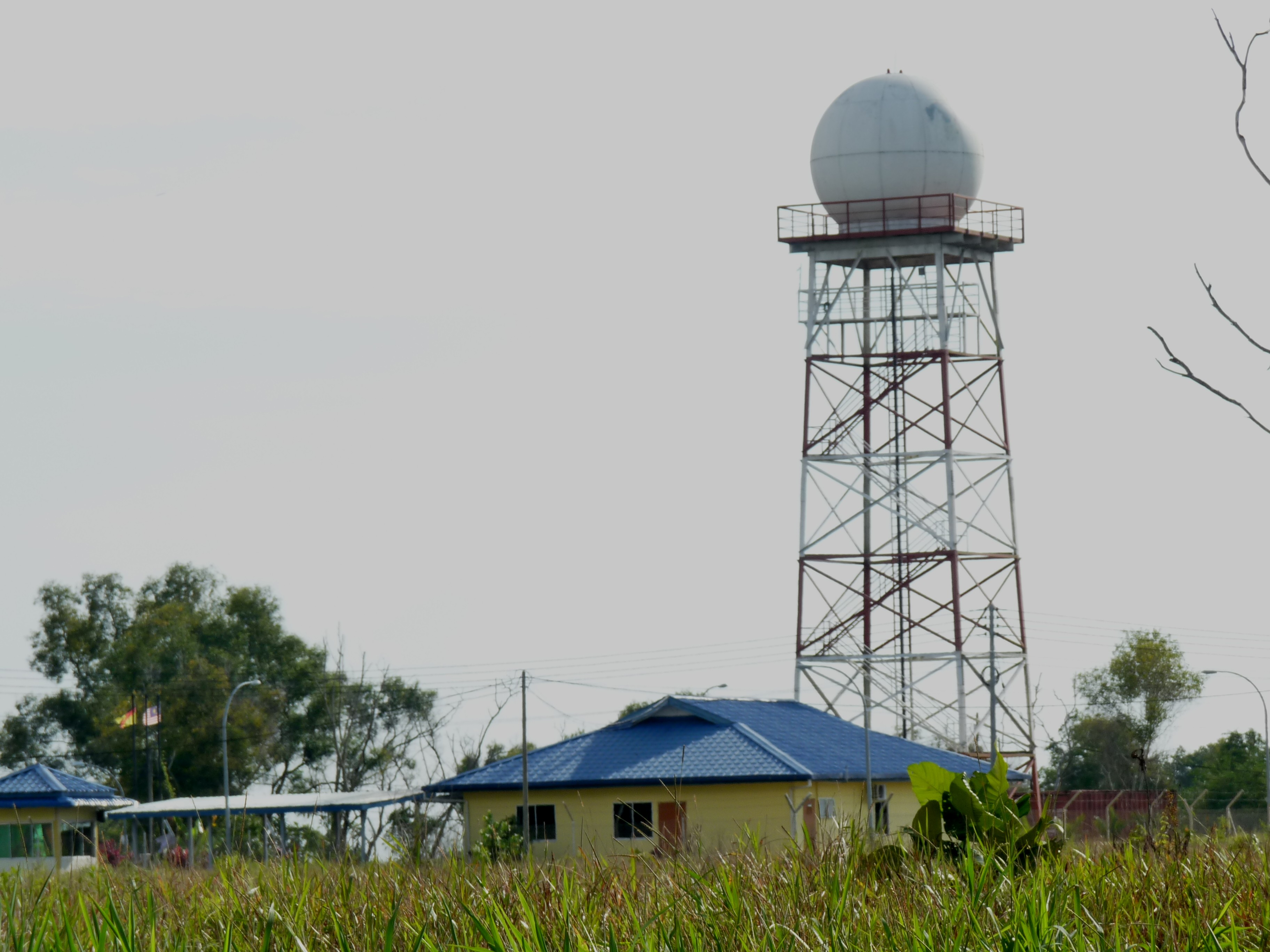
Miri, Sarawak, weather radar station.

Malaysian Meteorological Department

- Director General
  - Deputy Director General (Strategic & Technical)
    - Research & Technical Development Division
    - National Climate Centre
    - Technical Training Division
    - Strategic Planning & International Division
    - Meteorological Communication Division
  - Deputy Director General (Operation)
    - National Weather & Geophysic Operation Centre
    - Technical Weather & Geophysic Division
    - Radar & Satellite Meteorological Division
  - National Meteorological Aviation Centre
  - States Meteorological Office
  - Management Service Division
  - Meteorological Instrumentation & Atmospheric Science Centre
  - Corporate Communication Unit
  - Integrity Unit
