= Constitution (Amendment) Bill 2026 =

Bill to impose term limit on Malaysia's Prime Minister

Parliament of Malaysia
- Long title: An Act to amend the Federal Constitution.
- Citation: D.R.4/2026
- Territorial extent: Malaysia
- Considered by: Dewan Rakyat

Legislative history
- Introduced by: Azalina Othman Said - Minister in the Prime Minister's Department (Law and Institutional Reform)
- First reading: 23 February 2026
- Second reading: 2 March 2026
- Voting summary: 146 voted for; None voted against; 44 abstained; 32 absent

Amends
- Federal Constitution of Malaysia

Summary
- A constitutional amendment to impose a 10 years term limit on the office of Prime Minister.

Keywords
- Prime Minister, term limit, term of office, Cabinet
- Status: Not passed

Constitution (Amendment) Bill 2026 (Malay: Rang Undang-Undang Perlembagaan (Pindaan) 2026) is a proposed constitutional amendment in Malaysia to impose a 10-year term limit on the office of the Prime Minister of Malaysia. This proposed bill, if passed, would prohibit any person from holding the office of prime minister for more than an aggregated amount of 10 years, whether in a continuous term or otherwise.

If a prime minister's tenure exceed the 10-years term limit, he and his Cabinet members would automatically cease to hold their respective offices, but would be permitted to govern as a caretaker government until the appointment of a new prime minister by the Yang di-Pertuan Agong.

This newly added term limit would also apply retrospectively to all current and former prime ministers.

On 2 March 2026, the bill failed to achieve the constitutionally required two-third majority support in the Dewan Rakyat by two votes and was not passed by the said lower house.

== Background ==
=== Previous proposals ===
Before the tabling of this bill, there has been three previous push by the Malaysian government to impose term limits on the post of prime minister.

The first push being in 2019, where the Pakatan Harapan (PH) government led by Mahathir Mohamad sought to introduce a two parliamentary terms limit by tabling a similar constitutional amendment bill in December 2019. But the bill was formally withdrawn in August 2020 after the Muhyiddin Yassin-led Perikatan Nasional (PN) government came into power during the 2020-2022 Malaysian political crisis.

The second push was in August 2021, where Muhyiddin in the face of dwindling parliamentary support, proposed a number of reforms, including a two-term limit on prime minister's tenure, to appeal for opposition parties' support. However, Muhyiddin and his cabinet resigned three days later after the announcement.

The third push occurred in September 2021, in which prime minister Ismail Sabri Yaakob proposed to introduce a 10-year limit on the post. The proposal was included in a confidence and supply deal signed with the opposition parties. A bill was originally slated to be tabled by March 2022, but was never materialised, and the Malaysian parliament was dissolved in October that year to make way for the 2022 general election.

=== Current proposal ===
Following the 2022 general election, Anwar Ibrahim's unity government came into power in December 2022. During parliamentary question time in March and July 2024 respectively, his government indicated that a study on a proposed 10-year term limit has been underway.

In March 2025, DAP secretary general and transport minister Loke Siew Fook suggested that a maximum 10 years limit should be put on the prime minister position through a constitutional amendment in the next two years, during a speech in his party's 18th national congress, in which prime minister Anwar Ibrahim was also in attendance. Following Loke's speech, Anwar in response said that he and his party PKR, and the Pakatan Harapan coalition have agreed to such proposal, but would require two-third majority supports from the members of the parliament (MPs), which include MPs from parties outside the PH coalition.

On 19 March 2025, Anwar during a cabinet meeting ordered his cabinet to carry out a comprehensive study on the matter. Preliminary findings from an early study was also presented to the cabinet on that day. On 24 July, law minister Azalina Othman Said revealed in a written parliamentary reply that the government will also discuss with various political parties to acquire a consensus over the proposal, including parties from Sabah and Sarawak.

On 5 January 2026, in his 2026 New Year's Message speech at the prime minister's department, Anwar Ibrahim announced that a bill will be tabled in the upcoming parliamentary session to limit prime minister's term to 10 years or two parliamentary terms, along with other reforms such as separation of the prosecutorial role from the attorney general, Ombudsman Act, and Freedom of Information Act. Following Anwar's announcement, law minister Azalina Othman later on the same day said that legislations for these reforms would be put up for debate in the upcoming parliament session in February 2026.

On 29 January, at a press conference after a town hall session on the proposed bill, Azalina said that the cabinet will deliberate on the proposal the following day. On 30 January, the cabinet agreed to the proposal and the government decided to proceed with the relevant constitutional amendment.

On 20 February, when asked about whether the amendment would apply to him, Anwar stated that: "Yes, it starts with me. I cannot make a law for others alone. It must apply to me first".

=== In the Dewan Rakyat ===
The bill was first tabled to the Dewan Rakyat for first reading by the law minister Azalina Othman on 23 February 2026. As this is a constitutional amendment, a two-third majority would be required in order to pass this bill in both Houses of the Parliament. It was originally expected to be debated by the lower house during the second reading stage on 3 March, but the second reading was commenced one day earlier on 2 March.

On 2 March, after being debated by 41 MPs from both government and opposition parties, the bill was put up to a vote. The bill received 146 votes in favour, no rejection, and 44 abstention. A total of 32 MPs were also absent during the vote. The bill therefore failed to achieve the 148 votes of two-third majority threshold by merely 2 votes, and in consequence failed to be passed by the Dewan Rakyat.

On the following day, communications minister Fahmi Fadzil stated the bill can still be retabled at any time, including in the two upcoming parliamentary sessions in June and October 2026. On 4 March, Fahmi claimed that some opposition MPs has misunderstood that the bill would extend Anwar's premiership by another 10 years.

== Legal provisions ==
In Clause 1 of the bill, it is provided that the amendment shall be cited as the Constitution (Amendment) Act 2026, and would only come into operation on a date to be determined by the Yang di-Pertuan Agong in the Gazette.

In Clause 2, the bill will amend Article 43 of the Federal Constitution of Malaysia by inserting a new Clause (2A), which stipulated that no prime minister shall at any time hold the office for more than an aggregated period of 10 years, either in a continuous term or otherwise.

Clause 2 of the bill will also insert Clause (4A), (4B), (4C), and (4D) into Article 43, which provided that if the 10 years term limit was exceeded by the prime minister, he would cease to hold the office of prime minister. All cabinet members would also simultaneously cease to hold their ministerial posts if the prime minister exceeded the term limit. However, under the new Clause (4C), the prime minister and the cabinet members can still discharge their functions in the form of a caretaker government until a new prime minister is appointed by the Yang di-Pertuan Agong.

In Clause (4D), it is provided that any person who have held the office of prime minister before the commencement of this amendment shall have their previous premiership duration be taken into account when calculating whether he has exceeded the 10 years limit. However, the period of being a caretaker prime minister after the dissolution of parliament will not be taken into account.

If it become law, the provision of Clause (4D) would entirely prevent Malaysia's longest-serving prime minister Mahathir Mohamad from being appointed to the office again, as he has previously served for a cumulative of 24 years. Ex-prime minister Najib Razak would also only be permitted to serve as prime minister for one year, if he was re-elected after being released from prison.

A minor consequential amendment will also be made on Clause (5) of Article 43, to include a reference to the new Clause (4B) in Article 43(5).

== See also ==
- Constitution of Malaysia
- Prime Minister of Malaysia
- Term limit
- Term of office
