= Term limit =

Legal restriction limiting the number of terms an officeholder may serve

A term limit is a nomination rule which restricts the number of terms a person may run for and serve in a particular elected office. When term limits are found in presidential and semi-presidential systems they act as a method to eliminate the potential for "president for life", check the concentration of power in the executive, and curb authoritarianism. Term limits may be a lifetime limit on the number of terms an officeholder may serve, or a limit on the number of consecutive terms.

According to a 2020 analysis, nearly one in four incumbents who face term limits seek to circumvent the term limits through various strategies, including constitutional amendments, working with the judiciary to reinterpret the term limits, let a placeholder govern for the incumbent, and cancelling or delaying elections. Incumbents that seek to circumvent term limits frequently use repression of the opposition, electoral manipulation and foreign support to enable their circumvention. According to a 2025 research project, attempts to circumvent term limits had become increasingly prevalent in African states over time, with few such attempts prior to 2000 and many such attempts post-2000.

== History ==
=== Europe ===
Term limits appear to originate in Europe. They date back to Ancient Greece and the Roman Republic, as well as the Republic of Venice. In ancient Athenian democracy, many officeholders were limited to a single term. Council members were allowed a maximum of two terms. The position of Strategos could be held for an indefinite number of terms. In the Roman Republic, a law was passed imposing a limit of a single term on the office of censor. The annual magistrates, including the tribune of the plebs, the aedile, the quaestor, the praetor, and the consul, were forbidden reelection until a number of years had passed. The office of dictator was nearly unrestricted with the exception that it was limited to a single six-month term. Successive Roman leaders weakened this restriction until Julius Caesar became a perpetual dictator and ended the republic.

Term limits returned in medieval Europe through the Russian city-states of Novgorod and Pskov, as well as the Italian city-states of Genoa and Florence. Similar to the Italian city-states, Novgorod had a mixed government, in which executive power was shared between the elected prince and the elected posadnik (mayor), whose authority increased over time. In the mid-14th century, the office of posadnik consisted of six executives elected for life; from among them, a chairman was elected for a one-year term and later a six-month term from the early 15th century. Pskov also elected posadniki until it was annexed by Moscow in 1510. In Genoa, the doge was elected for a single two-year term from 1528 to 1798. In Florence, power was vested in the executive council and members were elected for two-month terms.

The first modern constitutional term limit was established in the French First Republic by the Constitution of 1795, which established five-year terms to the French Directory and banned consecutive terms. Napoleon ended the practice of term limits in 1799 in much the same way as Julius Caesar had. The French Constitution of 1848 reestablished term limits, but this was abolished by Napoleon's nephew, Napoleon III.

Many post-Soviet republics established presidential systems with five-year term limits after the dissolution of the Soviet Union in 1991. The president of Russia is allowed a maximum of two consecutive terms, but the 2020 constitutional amendments reset incumbent president Vladimir Putin's term count, allowing him to stand for two additional terms. The president of Belarus was limited to two terms, but the limit was abolished in 2004 under Alexander Lukashenko.

The president of the European Commission has no term limit.

=== United States ===
A predecessor of modern term limits in the Americas dates back to the 1682 Pennsylvania Charter of Liberties and the colonial frame of government of the same year, authored by William Penn and providing for triennial rotation of the Provincial Council, the upper house of the colonial legislature. Presidents of the United States typically honored an informal tradition of only serving two terms in office, but this limit was not enshrined into law until the 22nd Amendment to the Constitution was ratified in 1951 after Franklin D. Roosevelt had been elected to an unprecedented third and fourth terms.

=== Latin America ===
As the countries of Latin America modeled presidential republics after the government of the United States in the 19th century, they established term limits for their presidents based on the two-term precedent of the United States. However, the implementation of legislative term limits in Latin America, while intended to foster elite renewal, occurs in a region already characterized by exceptionally high rates of legislative turnover (around 70% on average between 1985 and 2023), significantly higher than in Europe and other democratic regions. In response to presidents overstaying their term, some of these term limits were eventually replaced by a limit of one term without reelection.

In Mexico, Porfirio Díaz evaded term limits, running for eight terms before being forced into exile in 1911. A new constitution in 1917 established a one-term limit. After Álvaro Obregón violated this law and ran for a second term, he was assassinated. Currently, members of the Congress of Mexico cannot be reelected consecutively under article 50 and 59 of the Constitution of Mexico, and the President of Mexico is limited to a single six-year term, called the sexenio.

The President of Argentina was limited to one six-year term, until 1994 when the Constitution of Argentina was amended, changing the term limit to a maximum of two consecutive four-year terms.

In 1997, the Constitution of Brazil was amended, loosening the term limit for the President of Brazil from one five-year term to two four-year terms.

In 2004, the term limit for the President of Colombia was increased from one term to two terms before reverting to one term in 2015.

The 2009 Venezuelan constitutional referendum abolished term limits in Venezuela.

A 2024 study found that Costa Rica's new mayoral term limits modestly increased competition but had little impact on turnout.

In 2025, the Legislative Assembly of El Salvador approved a constitutional reform that extended terms of the President of El Salvador to six years, as well as abolishing term limits; the change will go into effect following the 2027 presidential election.

=== Asia ===
Following the 1911 Revolution, Prime Minister of the Imperial Cabinet Yuan Shikai became the second President of the Republic of China. He was initially subject to a maximum of two five-year terms, but the term was then lengthened to ten years and the term limit was removed.

In 1948, the Temporary Provisions against the Communist Rebellion abolished the term limit for the President of the Republic of China and established Chiang Kai-shek as the country's military leader. The term limit was restored after the provisions were repealed in 1991.

The President of South Korea was initially permitted to serve a maximum of two four-year terms when the office was created in 1948, but the term limit was removed in 1954 so that Syngman Rhee could run for a third term. After Rhee was elected to a fourth term, the First Republic of Korea was overthrown. The two-term limit was restored, but it was expanded to three terms in 1969 and abolished again in 1972. A one seven-year term limit was established in 1981, which was reduced to five years in 1988.

Under the original Constitution of Indonesia, there were no presidential or vice-presidential term limits, but since the first amendment in 1999 holders of both offices are limited to two terms each.

The Philippines established term limits following independence from the United States, but they were abolished by Ferdinand Marcos in the 1970s. Term limits were restored in the 1987 constitution, after Marcos was deposed in the People Power Revolution. The President is limited to one six-year term.

Between 1982 and 2018, the Constitution of China stipulated that the president, vice president, premier and vice premiers could not serve more than two consecutive terms, though there was no term limit for the General Secretary of the Chinese Communist Party, who usually represented the paramount leader of China. In March 2018, the National People's Congress passed a constitutional amendment which abolished the term limits for the president and vice president, as well as enhancing the central role of the Chinese Communist Party (CCP), allowing CCP General Secretary Xi Jinping to continue as paramount leader and president indefinitely. A 2023 study found, using survey experiments, that there was not majority support among the Chinese public for removing the term limits.

The President of Tajikistan was initially limited to one five-year term under the 1994 Constitution of Tajikistan. This was increased to one seven-year term in 1999 and to two seven-year terms in 2003. The term limit was reset for President Emomali Rahmon in 2006, and the term limit was abolished in 2016.

The Prime Minister of Pakistan was limited to one five-year term until the limit was abolished in 2011.

The King of Malaysia is subjected to a single five-year non-consecutive term, which rotates among the monarchs of Malaysia. This rule makes Malaysia among two constitutional monarchies in the world that is subjected to a term limit, the other being Andorra (with the President of France serving as one of its co-princes). In February 2026, the Constitution (Amendment) Bill 2026 was tabled to the Parliament of Malaysia, seeking to limit the Prime Minister's term in office to an aggregate total of 10 years. It however failed to secure two-third majority support at the lower house by merely two votes when it was put up for vote in March 2026.

=== Sub-Saharan Africa ===
Liberia briefly limited its presidents to an eight-year term between 1944 and 1951. As the countries of sub-Saharan Africa were decolonised in the mid-20th century, most of the new governments established presidential systems, but term limits were rarely established. The Democratic Republic of the Congo, Gabon, Rwanda, and Togo were the only countries to establish them, but they were abolished soon afterward. After the revolutions of 1989 and ensuing wave of democratization in Eastern Europe, many African states moved to remove one-party regimes and establish term limits.

In Sub-Saharan Africa, as of 2023, only 15 countries have experienced a peaceful transition of power from one president to another after the expiration of term limits. Some countries have either scrapped the requirement or do not have it in their laws.

Term limits for the President of Gabon were abolished under Omar Bongo in 2003, allowing him to seek a seventh term as president. A two-term limit was reintroduced following the 2024 Gabonese constitutional referendum.

The President of Uganda was limited to two five-year terms in 1995. President Yoweri Museveni had previously served two terms, but these were not counted toward the new two-term limit. The term limit was abolished in 2005, allowing Museveni to continue as president.

In Kenya, the 2010 constitution limits the president to a maximum of two five-year terms just like county governors. Daniel arap Moi was the first Kenyan president to be barred from running for re-election in 2002. His successor Mwai Kibaki was president for ten years, in a tenure that was characterized by major political reforms leading to the 2010 constitution. Uhuru Kenyatta was the first president under the new law, a position he served for two terms of 5 years each until was succeeded by his deputy William Ruto in September 2022. A member of President Ruto's United Democratic Alliance party revealed plans to scrap the term limits on 7 November 2022 but the leadership dismissed him saying that was his personal opinion which he was entitled to.

The 1999 constitution of Nigeria limits the President at the federal level, and Governors at the state level to serving two four-year terms. This has been strictly followed since the end of military rule in 1999.

=== Middle East and North Africa ===
Term limits were one of the major demands of protesters during the Arab Spring.

The 2019 Egyptian constitutional referendum included amendments to expand the presidential term from four to six years and allow President Abdel Fattah el-Sisi to stand for a third term over the constitutional limit of two terms.

== Mechanism ==
Term limits are an element of constitutionalism that serves to limit the negative effects of democracy.

Term limits may take the form of consecutive term limits or lifetime term limits. With consecutive term limits, an officeholder can only serve a certain number of terms before they have to stop running for that office. After a set period of time, the clock resets on the limit, and the officeholder may run for election to their original office and serve up to the limit again. With lifetime limits, an officeholder may never again run for election to that office when they have served up to the limit. Lifetime limits are much more restrictive than consecutive limits.

Countries that operate a parliamentary system of government are less likely to employ term limits on their leaders. This is because such leaders rarely have a set "term" at all: rather, they serve as long as they have the confidence of the parliament, a period which could potentially last for life. Many parliaments can be dissolved for snap elections which means some parliaments can last for mere months while others can continue until their expiration dates. Nevertheless, such countries may impose term limits on the holders of other offices—in republics, for example, a ceremonial presidency may have a term limit, especially if the office holds reserve powers.

Due in part to a lack of legal term limits in African countries, Mo Ibrahim created the Ibrahim Prize with an associated cash prize to incentivize African leaders to promote human rights and democratic transfer of power.

== Violation of term limits ==
Many presidents have tried to overstay their respective term limits by various methods. According to one analysis, nearly one in four incumbents who faced term limits sought to circumvent the term limits. The most common way in which they attempt this is through constitutional amendments (in particular, when the incumbent's party controls the legislature). Other strategies include getting the judiciary to re-interpret term limit provisions; letting a placeholder succeed the incumbent while the incumbent still governs in practice; write a new constitution; or delay/cancel elections.

Between 1960 and 2010, more than one quarter of term-limited presidents successfully extended or violated their term limits to stay in power, and the enforcement of term limits is recognized as one of the great challenges in democratic development. Term limits typically receive greater domestic and international recognition than other mechanisms of democracy, and attempts to violate term limits are typically met with strong resistance by a country's population and on the world stage. The violation of term limits is strongly correlated with democratic backsliding and the erosion of human rights.

Whether a president seeks to subvert term limits may be affected by how much wealth can be gained from the office, opportunities for acquiring wealth after leaving office, what constraints are in place to enforce term limits, how much control leader has over other branches of government or a political party, precedent in the region, and the likelihood of facing criminal prosecution upon leaving office. Presidents are more likely to be successful in violating term limits if they control the other branches of government, whether through their political parties or through insufficient checks and balances. Though violation of term limits is more common in less democratic countries, political opposition, foreign governments, and the citizenry can still enforce term limits in nondemocratic countries.

A president may attempt to circumvent term limits indirectly by extending their rule without an additional term. This may be done by extending the length of the term or postponing elections. In some cases, a president may circumvent term limits by officially stepping down from office but maintaining de facto control of the government.

== See also ==
- Gerontocracy
- List of political term limits
- Reelection
- Term of office
