= Merdeka Center =

Malaysian market research company

- Company type: Private limited
- Industry: Market research; Public opinion research
- Founded: 2003; 23 years ago
- Founder: Ibrahim Suffian; Hazman Hamid
- Headquarters: Petaling Jaya, Malaysia
- Area served: Southeast Asia, Taiwan, Australia
- Key people: Ibrahim Suffian (Director of Programs); Hazman Hamid (Director of Operations)
- Website: www.merdeka.org

Merdeka Center for Opinion Research or simply known as Merdeka Center is a Malaysian based market research and public opinion firm that is headquartered in Petaling Jaya, Selangor with call centers located throughout Malaysia, such as in Bangi, Kuala Terengganu, Sandakan and Tampin. The company was founded in 1999 by Ibrahim Suffian and Hazman Hamid but was formally established in 2003 as a private company called Merdeka Strategic Development Centre Sdn. Bhd. It is also a registered supplier with the Malaysian Ministry of Finance (MOF).

== History ==
Since its inception, Merdeka Center has played a central role in Malaysian national politics by providing accurate and timely public opinion data. Its work has been instrumental in improving the quality of public debate and widening participation in the political process.

As of 2025, Merdeka Center has conducted over a million interviews involving approximately 1,100 separate survey projects in Malaysia and neighboring ASEAN countries such as Singapore, Thailand, Brunei, Indonesia, the Philippines, and Myanmar through collaboration with local organizations, mainly with federal and state governments.

== Methodology ==
Merdeka Center specializes in market research and opinion polling with an emphasis on political and socio-economic analysis through physical and online methods. The company's methodology involves obtaining responses from conducting surveys in person, particularly via in-depth interviews (IDIs), focus group discussions (FGDs) and online calls, where weighting these responses are in line with demographic information.

== Memberships ==
Merdeka Center is a founding member of the Malaysian Market Research Association, a member of the Asian Network for Public Opinion Research (ANPOR), as well as the World Association for Public Opinion Research (WAPOR).

== Polling ==
=== Elections ===
During the 2013 Malaysian general election, Malaysia’s most heated polls in recent times, Merdeka Center was just off by 0.1 per cent in predicting the popular vote, and had correctly forecast the Pakatan Rakyat (PR) opposition pact’s victory in 89 seats.

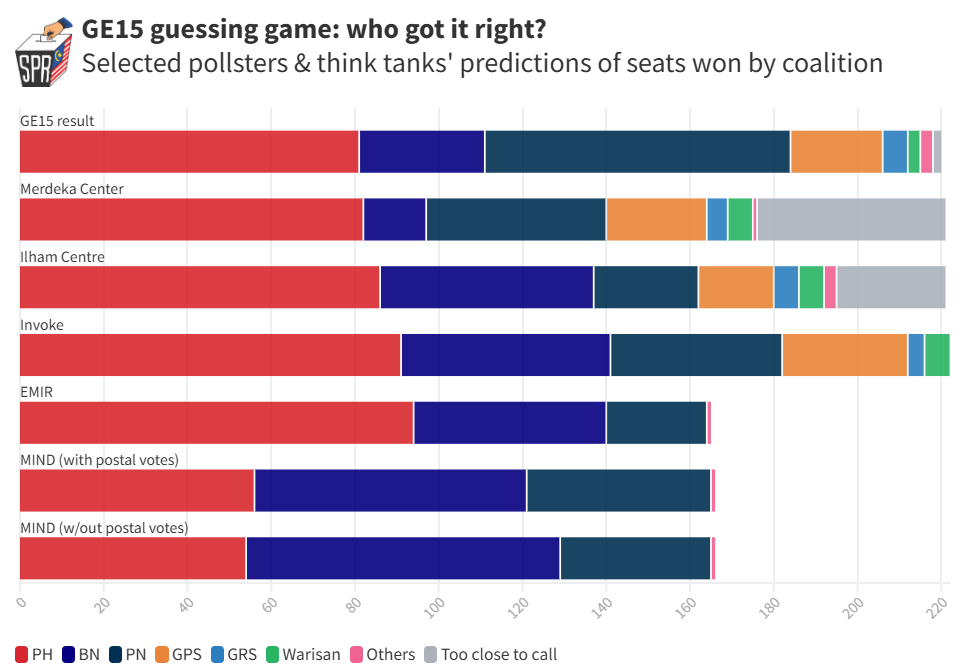
Selected pollsters & think tanks' predictions of seats won by coalition

In the latest 2022 Malaysian general election, Merdeka Center's polls were the most accurate in predicting the number of seats won by the Pakatan Harapan coalition, compared to rival firms such as EMIR Research, Ilham Center, and Invoke Malaysia, with the poll only missing by one seat.

=== Government ratings ===
Merdeka Center has consistently conducted surveys assessing government approval ratings in Malaysia. Reports are distributed every end of the year which includes the latest 2nd Anniversary Unity Government Survey Highlights which reported that Prime Minister Anwar Ibrahim's approval rating increased to 54% in the second year of the Madani administration, up from 50% the previous year where the federal government's approval rating also rose to 51% from 46%. Other notable research includes post-election ratings particularly after 100 days and 1 year.

=== Youth issues ===
Merdeka Center has conducted several comprehensive studies focusing on youth issues in Malaysia, with the latest being the 2024 National Youth Survey which was conducted between April 3 and May 12, 2024, gathered responses from 1,605 Malaysian youths aged 18 to 30. It explored topics such as perceptions of unfair treatment, inter-ethnic trust, and openness to leadership roles for women. Findings revealed that 58% of respondents felt they were treated unfairly, an increase from 43% in January 2023. Additionally, while 57% of Malay respondents expressed distrust towards the Chinese community, 59% of all respondents supported the idea of a female prime minister. Moreover, the poll highlighted how Malaysian youths have become more polarized which confirms obvious realities and ingrained beliefs.

The firm has also made a similar poll in 2021 as well as a Muslim centered youth survey in 2022 with Sisters in Islam which focused on the perspectives of Muslim youths in Malaysia and their views on religious practices, societal roles, and contemporary issues affecting their community.

=== Foreign policy ===
The firm has also conducted opinion polling projects assessing foreign policies with international clients. For example, in partnership with The Asia Foundation, Merdeka Center evaluated the community impact of two Belt and Road Initiative projects in Malaysia, providing community-informed recommendations to policymakers.

== See also ==
- 2018 Malaysian general election
- 2022 Malaysian general election
- 2023 Malaysian state elections
