= Anwar Ibrahim =

Prime Minister of Malaysia since 2022

Yang Amat Berhormat Dato' Seri Anwar Ibrahim DK I (Brunei) SPMK SSSK SSPJ SPCM SSAP SPNS DUPN SPDK DGSM DMPN KGCR NPk MP
- أنوار إبراهيم
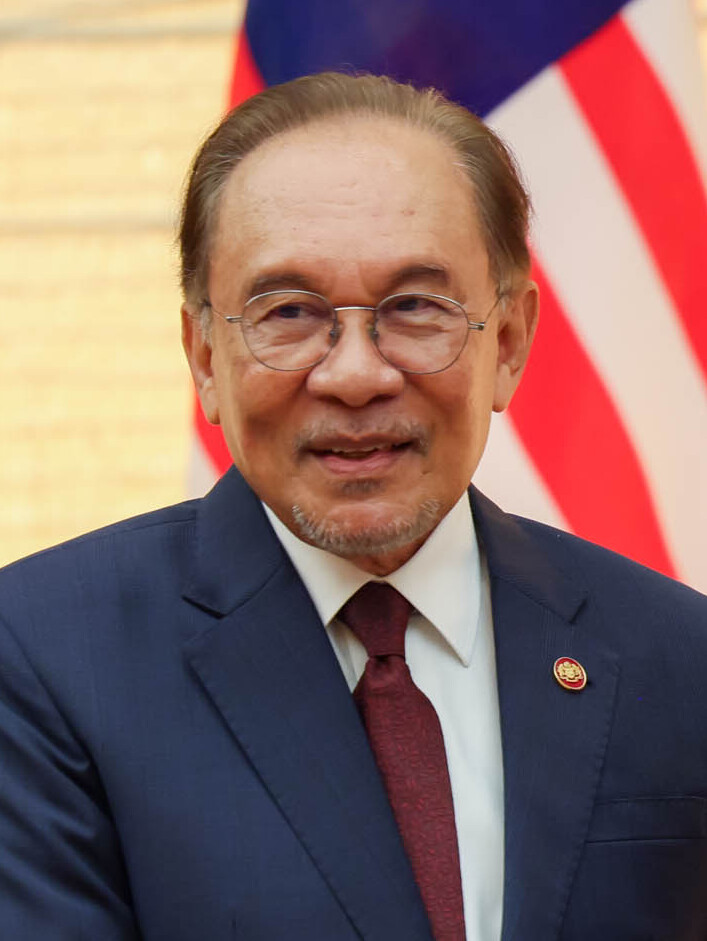
- Anwar in 2026

10th Prime Minister of Malaysia
- Incumbent
- Assumed office 24 November 2022
- Monarchs: Abdullah (2019–2024); Ibrahim Iskandar (2024–present)
- Deputy: Ahmad Zahid Hamidi; Fadillah Yusof
- Preceded by: Ismail Sabri Yaakob

12th and 16th Leader of the Opposition
- In office 18 May 2020 – 24 November 2022
- Monarch: Abdullah
- Prime Minister: Muhyiddin Yassin; Ismail Sabri Yaakob
- Preceded by: Ismail Sabri Yaakob
- Succeeded by: Hamzah Zainudin
- In office 28 August 2008 – 16 March 2015
- Monarchs: Mizan Zainal Abidin (2006–2011); Abdul Halim (2011–2016)
- Prime Minister: Abdullah Ahmad Badawi (2003–2009); Mohd Najib Abdul Razak (2009–2018)
- Preceded by: Wan Azizah Wan Ismail
- Succeeded by: Wan Azizah Wan Ismail

2nd Chairman of Pakatan Harapan
- Incumbent
- Assumed office 14 May 2020
- President: Wan Azizah Wan Ismail
- Preceded by: Mahathir Mohamad

2nd President of the People's Justice Party
- Incumbent
- Assumed office 17 November 2018
- Deputy: Azmin Ali (2010–2020); Rafizi Ramli (2022–2025); Nurul Izzah Anwar (since 2025, on leave: since 2026); Saifuddin Nasution Ismail (acting: since 2026)
- Preceded by: Wan Azizah Wan Ismail

7th Deputy Prime Minister of Malaysia
- In office 1 December 1993 – 2 September 1998
- Prime Minister: Mahathir Mohamad
- Preceded by: Abdul Ghafar Baba
- Succeeded by: Abdullah Ahmad Badawi
Ministerial portfolios
1983–1984	Minister of Culture, Youth and Sports
1984–1986	Minister of Agriculture
1986–1991	Minister of Education
1991–1998	Minister of Finance
2022–present	Minister of Finance
Parliamentary offices
Member of the Malaysian Parliament for Tambun
Incumbent
Assumed office 19 November 2022
Preceded by	Ahmad Faizal Azumu
Majority	3,736 (2.99%)
Member of the Malaysian Parliament for Port Dickson
In office 15 October 2018 – 19 November 2022
Preceded by	Danyal Balagopal Abdullah
Succeeded by	Aminuddin Harun
Majority	23,560 (2018)
Member of the Malaysian Parliament for Permatang Pauh
In office 28 August 2008 – 16 March 2015
Preceded by	Wan Azizah Wan Ismail
Succeeded by	Wan Azizah Wan Ismail
In office 29 March 1982 – 14 April 1999
Preceded by	Zabidi Ali
Succeeded by	Wan Azizah Wan Ismail

Personal details
- Born: Anwar bin Ibrahim; 10 August 1947 (age 79) Bukit Mertajam, Crown Colony of Penang, Malayan Union
- Citizenship: Malaysia
- Party: PKR (since 2003); KeADILan (1999–2003); UMNO (1982–98)
- Other political affiliations: Pakatan Harapan (since 2015); Pakatan Rakyat (2008–2015); Barisan Alternatif (1999–2004); Barisan Nasional (1982–1998)
- Spouse: Wan Azizah Wan Ismail (m. 1980)
- Children: 6, including Nurul Izzah
- Parents: Ibrahim Abdul Rahman (father); Che Yan Hussein (mother)
- Education: Bukit Mertajam High School; Malay College Kuala Kangsar; University of Malaya (BA); National University of Malaysia (MA)
- Occupation: Politician
- Anwar Ibrahim's voice Anwar talking about Malaysia and multiculturalism. Recorded 8 June 2023

Anwar bin Ibrahim (Note: Jawi: أنوار بن إبراهيم; Malay pronunciation: [anua(r) ibrahem]; Also known as DSAI and PMX, abbreviations for Dato' Seri Anwar Ibrahim and Prime Minister X (as the 10th prime minister), respectively.) (born 10 August 1947) is a Malaysian politician who has served as the 10th prime minister of Malaysia since 2022. A member of the People's Justice Party (PKR), he served as Member of Parliament (MP) for Tambun since 2022. Upon becoming prime minister, he appointed himself Minister of Finance. Anwar is also the president of PKR since 2018 and the chairman of Pakatan Harapan coalition since 2020.

Born in the Crown Colony of Penang during the Malayan Union, Anwar graduated from University of Malaya. Prior to entering politics, he served as president of the National Union of Malaysian Muslim Students and of the Malaysian Islamic Youth Movement. He later joined UMNO, then the dominant party in the long-ruling Barisan Nasional coalition. He became the 7th deputy prime minister in 1993 and served as minister of finance from 1991, playing a key role in Malaysia's response to the 1997 Asian financial crisis. In 1998, Anwar was removed from all government posts by then-Prime Minister Mahathir Mohamad and subsequently led the Reformasi movement against the government. He was jailed in April 1999 on charges of corruption and sodomy, until his release in 2004 after his conviction was overturned. He returned to politics as the 12th leader of the opposition from 2008 to 2015, merging opposition parties into the Pakatan Rakyat (PR) coalition, which contested the 2008 and 2013 general elections.

In 2014, Anwar attempted to become Menteri Besar of Selangor as part of the Kajang Move, sparking a nine-month political crisis that ended with a five-year prison sentence following a second sodomy conviction in 2015. While in prison, he rejoined Mahathir Mohamad in the new Pakatan Harapan (PH) coalition in absentia, which won the 2018 general election, with a plan for Anwar to succeed Mahathir as prime minister after an interim period. Anwar was granted a royal pardon and returned to parliament while his wife, Wan Azizah Wan Ismail, served as deputy prime minister. During the 2020–2022 Malaysian political crisis, the PH coalition collapsed, with Anwar becoming the opposition leader for a second term from 2020 to 2022.

Following the 2022 general election, where Pakatan Harapan won a plurality of seats, Anwar was sworn in as prime minister on 24 November 2022. He appointed MPs from PH, Gabungan Parti Sarawak (GPS), and UMNO as ministers in a unity government cabinet, retaining the finance portfolio for himself. During Anwar's premiership, his government introduced some reforms, including to subsidies, education and the death penalty, although a constitutional amendment introducing a 10-year term limit for prime ministers failed to pass. His government has faced controversy for the discharge not amounting to acquittal of Deputy Prime Minister Ahmad Zahid Hamidi, who faced corruption charges. In foreign affairs, Anwar's government supported Palestine in the Gaza war, litigated in the North Borneo dispute, and began the process of joining BRICS. As the ASEAN chairman from 2025 until 2026, Anwar facilitated a ceasefire between Thailand and Cambodia, addressing the border dispute through regional diplomatic channels.

== Early life and education ==
Anwar bin Ibrahim was born on 10 August 1947 in Cherok Tok Kun, Bukit Mertajam, Crown Colony of Penang, Malayan Union. However, during the 2023 state elections, he also stated that he was born in Sungai Bakap, Seberang Perai Selatan, Crown Colony of Penang, Malayan Union. His father, Ibrahim bin Abdul Rahman, started his career as a hospital porter, and later joined politics as a member of UMNO. Ibrahim won election as Seberang Tengah MP in 1959 and 1964, serving as the parliamentary secretary to the ministry of health from 1964 until his defeat in the 1969 general election by Parti Gerakan Rakyat Malaysia candidate Mustapha Hussain. Anwar's mother, Che Yan binti Hussein, was a housewife active in UMNO grassroots politics in Penang who served as head of the UMNO Women for Bukit Mertajam division in Penang.

Anwar attended three primary schools, Sekolah Melayu Sungai Bakap (1955), Sekolah Melayu Cherok Tok Kun (1957) and Sekolah Rendah Stowell, Bukit Mertajam (1959) and undertook his secondary education at Bukit Mertajam High School (Malay: SMK Tinggi Bukit Mertajam) before continuing at Malay College Kuala Kangsar (MCKK). He attended Bukit Mertajam High School for three years, where he excelled academically. Anwar was selected to take a special examination for entry into Malay College Kuala Kangsar, one of only three students from Penang to be chosen for this prestigious institution. He also served as a scout during his youth.

Anwar later pursued higher education at the University of Malaya, earning a bachelor's degree of arts (BA) in Malay Studies. Anwar also worked on his Master of Arts (MA) in Literature through the National University of Malaysia while imprisoned from 1974 to 1975.

== Early years and activism (1968–1982) ==
In 1974, Anwar was arrested and imprisoned under the Internal Security Act (ISA), which allowed for detention without trial and spent 20 months in the Kamunting Detention Centre.

From 1975 until 1982, he served as a representative for Asia Pacific of the World Assembly of Muslim Youth (WAMY).

Anwar Ibrahim is also the co-founder of the International Institute of Islamic Thought (IIIT) in the USA (founded in 1981). Anwar has been one of four acting directors, a board member of IIIT and a trustee. He was also a president of the International Islamic University Malaysia (IIUM) between 1988 and 1998.

== Early political career (1982–1993) ==
In 1982, Anwar, who was the founding leader and second president of ABIM, joined the UMNO, which was led by Mahathir Mohamad, who had become prime minister in 1981. Anwar's decision was influenced by the advice of Palestinian-American scholar Ismail al-Faruqi, who recognised the Mahathir administration's commitment to its Islamization agenda.

In the 1982 general election, he was elected as the MP for Permatang Pauh, which was created in the 1974 redistribution from parts of the Seberang Tengah constituency that his father had represented from 1959 to 1969.

Anwar first entered cabinet in 1982 as Deputy Minister in the Prime Minister's Department; his first ministerial office was that of Minister of Culture, Youth and Sports in 1983; after that, he headed the Agriculture Ministry in 1984 before becoming Minister of Education in 1986.

During his tenure as education minister, Anwar introduced numerous policies in the national school curriculum. One of his major changes was to rename the national language from Bahasa Malaysia to Bahasa Melayu, a decision later reverted in 2007 under the premiership of Abdullah Ahmad Badawi. Analysts and politicians have also attributed the rise in social conservatism and Islamism among Malays to the reforms and Islamisation of the education system done under Anwar, with former law minister Zaid Ibrahim labelling Anwar an "Islamist".

As education minister, Anwar was elected as the 25th president of UNESCO's General Conference. In 1988, Anwar Ibrahim became the second president of IIUM.

In 1991, Anwar was appointed as Minister of Finance. Shortly after becoming Finance Minister, Euromoney named him as a top-four finance minister and in 1996 Asiamoney named him Finance Minister of the Year. In the midst of the 1997 Asian financial crisis, Anwar, as a deputy prime minister and finance minister, was hailed for guiding Malaysia through the period of instability. Anwar backed free-market principles and highlighted the proximity of business and politics in Malaysia. He advocated greater accountability, refused to offer government bail-outs and instituted widespread spending cuts. In March 1998, Anwar was selected as the chairman of the Development Committee of World Bank and International Monetary Fund (IMF) from March 1998 until September 1998.

== Deputy premiership (1993–1998) ==
In 1993, he became Mahathir's deputy prime minister after beating Abdul Ghafar Baba for the position of Deputy President in UMNO. Anwar's allusions in public to his "son-father" relationship with Mahathir contributed to view that he was to be Mahathir's successor.

In May 1997, Mahathir appointed Anwar as acting prime minister while he embarked on a two-month working holiday.

In Mahathir's absence, Anwar independently took radical steps, which directly conflicted with Mahathir's policies, to change the country's governing mechanisms. Issues such as how Malaysia would respond to a financial crisis were often at the forefront of this conflict. Towards the end of the 1990s, his relationship with Mahathir began to deteriorate, triggered by their conflicting views on governance.

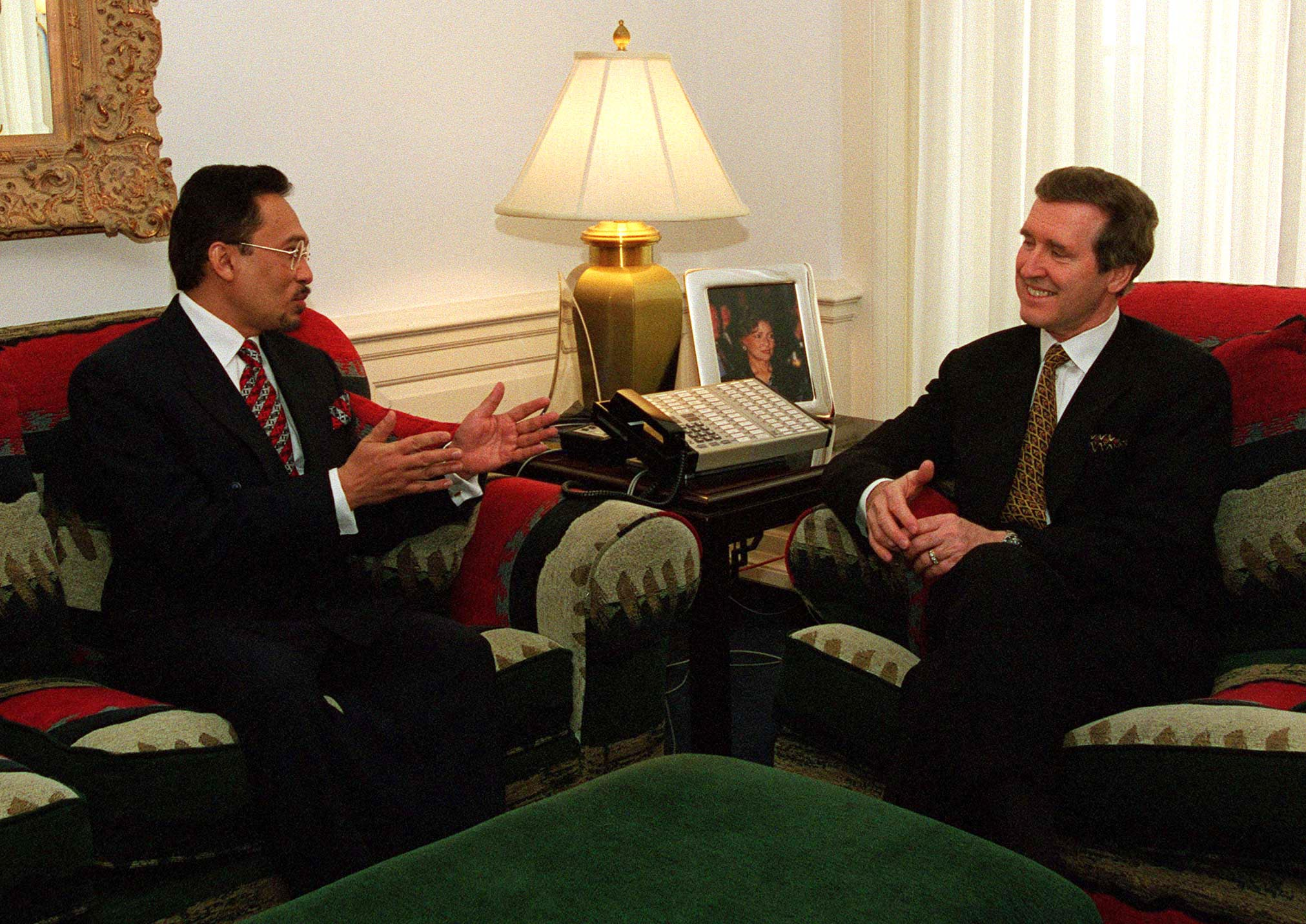
US Secretary of Defense William Cohen (right) meets with Anwar Ibrahim (left) at the Pentagon 1998.

=== Financial crisis ===
During the 1997 Asian Financial Crisis, Anwar supported the IMF plan as a finance minister. He also instituted an austerity package that cut government spending by 18%, cut ministerial salaries and deferred major projects. "Mega projects", despite being a cornerstone of Mahathir's development strategy, were greatly curtailed.

Although many Malaysian companies faced bankruptcy, Anwar declared: "There is no question of any bailout. The banks will be allowed to protect themselves and the government will not interfere." Anwar advocated a free-market approach to the crisis, including foreign investment and trade liberalisation. Mahathir blamed currency speculators like George Soros for the crisis and supported currency controls and tighter regulation of foreign investment.

=== Fall from power and first sodomy conviction ===
In 1998 the Newsweek magazine named Anwar the "Asian of the Year" in spite of being beaten by the then Inspector General of Police. However, in that year, matters between Anwar and Mahathir came to a head around the quadrennial UMNO General Assembly. The Youth wing of UMNO, headed by Anwar's associate Ahmad Zahid Hamidi, gave notice that it would initiate a debate on "cronyism and nepotism". At the General Assembly, a book by Khalid Jafri, "50 Dalil Mengapa Anwar Tidak Boleh Jadi PM" ("50 Arguments Why Anwar Shouldn't Be Prime Minister") was circulated containing graphic allegations of homosexuality, as well as accusations of corruption against Anwar. Khalid Jafri was an ex-editor of the government-controlled newspaper Utusan Malaysia and former editor-in-chief of a failed magazine, Harian National. Anwar obtained a court injunction to prevent further distribution of the book and filed a lawsuit against the author for defamation. Police charged the author of the book with malicious publishing of false news. The police were instructed to investigate the veracity of the claims.

On 2 September 1998, Anwar was fired from the Cabinet, and many reports state that he was under investigation for sodomy, an act that is illegal in Malaysia. The following day, he was expelled from UMNO. In what the Sydney Morning Herald termed a blatantly political fix-up, Anwar was arrested on 20 September 1998 and detained without trial under the country's controversial Internal Security Act (ISA). Weeks later, Anwar was charged with corruption for allegedly interfering with his own police investigation. While he was in police custody in 1998, Anwar was beaten by the Inspector General of Police, Abdul Rahim Mohd Noor. The public and the media only witnessed his black eye after being brought to Court for the first time. Rahim was subsequently found guilty of assault and jailed for two months in 2000. He made a public apology to Anwar and paid undisclosed damages.

During the trial, a mattress supposedly stained with Anwar's semen was presented to the court as DNA evidence of Anwar's sexual acts. Anwar denied having anything to do with the mattress, although the DNA tests came out positive. Lim Kong Boon, a DNA chemist, testified during the trial that DNA taken from 10 of 13 semen stains on the mattress matched Anwar's DNA. The defence team implied that DNA samples may have been taken from Anwar, while unconscious, after his beating in police custody, to create false forensics evidence to frame Anwar; however, High Court Judge Augustine Paul accepted that DNA evidence.

The High Court eventually handed down its decision in April 1999, sentencing Anwar to six years' imprisonment for corruption and sodomy. Two months later, he was sentenced to nine years' imprisonment for sodomy, which he was ordered to serve after completing his six-year sentence for corruption. His trial and conviction were widely challenged by the international community. Amnesty International claimed that the trial proceedings "exposed a pattern of political manipulation of key state institutions including the police, public prosecutor's office and the judiciary" and called Anwar a prisoner of conscience, arguing that his arrest was intended to silence political opposition.

The Federal Court overturned his conviction and Anwar was finally released from solitary confinement on 2 September 2004.

== Reformasi and formation of KEADILAN (1998–1999) ==
Shortly after Anwar was dismissed as deputy prime minister, Anwar and his supporters initiated the Reformasi movement. It consisted of several mass demonstrations and rallies against the long-standing Barisan Nasional coalition government.

Reformasi led to the formation of a new multiracial-based party named Parti Keadilan Nasional or National Justice Party (KEADILAN). In 1999, a general election was held. The new KEADILAN, Malaysian Islamic Party (PAS), and Democratic Action Party (DAP) formed a Barisan Alternatif or Alternative Front (BA), in a combined initiative to replace the standing Barisan Nasional (BN) coalition government. In August 2003, KEADILAN merged with Parti Rakyat Malaysia or Malaysian's People Party (PRM) to form Parti Keadilan Rakyat or People's Justice Party (PKR) headed by Wan Azizah as president. PKR made huge gains in the 2008 general election, winning 31 seats and becoming the parliament's largest opposition party. In April 2008, PKR, PAS and DAP formed a new alliance named Pakatan Rakyat (PR).

== Interim years (1999–2007) ==
=== First sodomy conviction ===
In 1999, Anwar brought suit against Prime Minister Mahathir for defamation for allegedly uttering accusations of immoral acts and calling Anwar a homosexual at a news conference in Malaysia.

The sodomy verdict was overturned in 2004, resulting in Anwar's release from prison as he had already served his sentence for the corruption offence. Anwar successfully sued Khalid Jafri for his 50 Dalil Kenapa Anwar Tidak Boleh Jadi PM book, but Khalid died in 2005 of complications from diabetes before the High Court found that he had committed libel and awarded Anwar millions of ringgit in compensation. The Federal Court on 8 March 2010 ruled that the 1998 dismissal of Anwar from his Cabinet posts by Mahathir was constitutional and valid, meaning Anwar had failed in his bid to challenge his sacking.

An appeal on the corruption charges was heard on 6 September 2004. Under Malaysian law, a person is banned from political activities for five years after the end of his sentence. Success in this appeal would have allowed him to return to politics immediately. On 7 September, the court agreed to hear Anwar's appeal. However, on 15 September, the Court of Appeal ruled unanimously that its previous decision to uphold a High Court ruling that found Anwar guilty was in order, relegating Anwar to the sidelines of Malaysian politics until 14 April 2008. The only way for Anwar to have been freed from this structure would have been for him to receive a pardon from the King of Malaysia.

=== Teaching and non-profit work ===
After his release from prison, Anwar held teaching positions at St Antony's College, Oxford, where he was a visiting fellow and senior associate member, at Johns Hopkins University's School of Advanced International Studies in Washington, D.C., as a Distinguished Senior Visiting Fellow, and in 2005–2006 as a visiting professor at the Prince Alwaleed Center for Muslim–Christian Understanding in the School of Foreign Service at Georgetown University. In March 2006 he was appointed as Honorary President of the London-based organisation AccountAbility (Institute of Social and Ethical AccountAbility).

In July 2006, Anwar was elected chair of the Washington-based Foundation For the Future. In this capacity, he signed 1 October 2006 letter to Robin Cleveland of the World Bank, requesting the transfer of Shaha Riza from the US Department of State to the Foundation for the Future. This transaction led to Paul Wolfowitz's resignation as president of the organisation. He was one of the signatories of "A Common Word Between Us and You" in 2007, an open letter by Islamic scholars to Christian leaders, calling for peace and understanding.

=== Return to politics ===
In November 2006, Anwar announced he planned to run for Parliament in 2008 after his disqualification expired. Anwar was critical of government policies after his release from prison, most notably the New Economic Policy (NEP), which provided affirmative action for the Bumiputras. The policy set a number of quotas, such as for units of housing and initial public offerings, that must be met.

Before he became re-entitled to run for Parliament in 2008, he acted as an "advisor" of Parti Keadilan Rakyat, the party of which his wife Dr Wan Azizah was president. He was at the forefront in organising a November 2007 mass rally, called the 2007 Bersih Rally, which took place at Dataran Merdeka, Kuala Lumpur, to demand clean and fair elections. The gathering was organised by Bersih, a coalition comprising political parties and civil society groups, and drew supporters from all over the country.

The 2008 general election date was set for 8 March 2008, before Anwar's disqualification from politics expired, sparking criticisms that Barisan Nasional called for early elections in a bid to deny Anwar's plans for a return to Parliament. In response, Anwar's wife, Wan Azizah Wan Ismail, declared that she would step down should she retain her Permatang Pauh parliamentary seat to force a by-election in which Anwar himself would contest.

When asked about the possibility of Anwar becoming the next prime minister, former leader Tun Dr Mahathir reacted by saying, "He would make a good Prime Minister of Israel".

On 14 April 2008, Anwar celebrated his official return to the political stage, as his ban from public office expired a decade after he was fired as deputy prime minister. The opposition seized a third of parliamentary seats and five states in the worst-ever showing for the Barisan Nasional coalition that has ruled for half a century, with Anwar at the helm. A gathering of more than 40,000 supporters greeted Anwar in a rally welcoming his return to politics. Police interrupted Anwar after he had addressed the rally for nearly two hours and called for him to stop the gathering since there was no legal permission for the rally.

On 29 April 2008, after 10 years of absence, he returned to the Parliament, albeit upon invitation as a spouse guest of Wan Azizah Wan Ismail, People's Justice Party and the first female opposition leader in Malaysian Parliament's history.

=== Permatang Pauh by-election ===
Anwar Ibrahim was victorious in the Permatang Pauh by-election held on 26 August 2008. Muhammad Muhammad Taib, information chief of the UMNO, stated: "Yes, of course we have lost ... we were the underdogs going into this race." Final results announced by the Election Commission revealed that Anwar Ibrahim won 31,195 of the estimated 47,000 votes cast in the district, while Arif Shah Omar Shah received 15,524 votes and a third candidate had 92 votes.

On 28 August 2008, Anwar, dressed in a dark blue traditional Malay outfit and black songkok hat, took the oath at the main chamber of Parliament house in Kuala Lumpur, as MP for Permatang Pauh at 10.03 am before Speaker Tan Sri Pandikar Amin Mulia. He formally declared Anwar the leader of the 3-party opposition alliance. With his daughter Nurul Izzah Anwar, also a parliamentarian, Anwar announced: "I'm glad to be back after a decade. The prime minister has lost the mandate of the country and the nation." At that time Anwar needed 30 government lawmakers to defect to the Opposition to form the next government.

== First term as Leader of the Opposition (2008–2015) ==
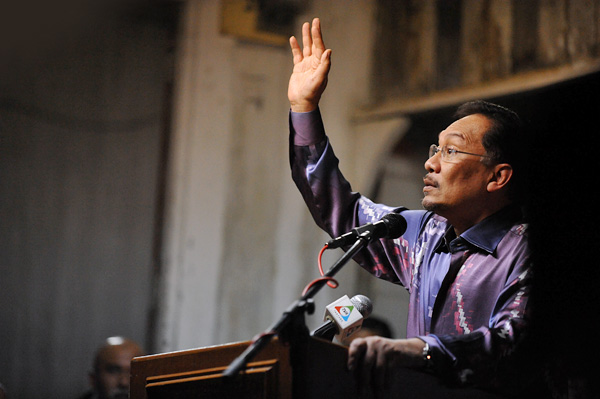
Anwar Ibrahim speaks at an election campaign in 2009 as opposition leader.

On 26 August 2008, Anwar won re-election in the Permatang Pauh by-election and returned to Parliament as Leader of the Opposition. He has stated the need for liberalisation, including an independent judiciary and free media, to combat the endemic corruption that he considers pushes Malaysia close to failed state status.

=== Petition against Najib Razak ===
Anwar continued to attack Najib on his first day as prime minister, stating he found inconsistencies in the latter's decision to release 13 Internal Security Act (ISA) detainees. He said as long as the ISA existed, Barisan Nasional could still detain citizens at will. In September 2011 Prime Minister Najib Razak acted to abolish the ISA and three other laws. Some members of the opposition did not view this in a positive way.

=== Parliamentary censure over APCO and 1Malaysia ===
Anwar has made numerous remarks about a supposed conspiracy among the Malaysian government, APCO (a public relations firm retained by the Malaysian government), Israel, and the United States. Anwar condemned the Malaysian government for seeking advice from APCO. He claims that the firm is linked to the "murder of Muslims in Palestine." He further claims to have given proof to a disciplinary committee of the Malaysian parliament, investigating his comments, that APCO is a front for the Israeli government. On another occasion, Anwar, speaking from the parliament, claimed that the firm was controlled by Jews and working on behalf of the American government to influence Malaysian foreign policy. He further implied that changes in Malaysian foreign policy could only be explained if Jews were manipulating Malaysia for the United States.

On 22 April 2010 Anwar was censured by Malaysia's parliament for remarks he made during a press conference in parliament on 30 March 2010. During the press conference, Anwar claimed to have documents linking 1Malaysia with One Israel and the public relations firm APCO but refused to allow access to the documents when challenged. The Malaysian government and APCO have both strongly denied Anwar's allegations. The censure motion passed by the House of Representatives referred Anwar's case to the Rights and Privileges Committee which will recommend a punishment for approval by the full chamber. Such punishment could include being banned from parliament. However Anwar retaliated against the Malaysian government attacks by producing two documents to support his claims of links between APCO and 1Malaysia.

=== Attempts to form a majority coalition ===
Anwar has missed several deadlines he personally set for the transfer of power. Anwar said he would need more time, and the recalibration of his message has not gone unnoticed: Deputy Prime Minister Najib Razak chose that day to initiate a broadband internet program Anwar opposes, saying that he had not doubted that the government would still be in office on 16 September. Prime Minister Abdullah Badawi too pointed out that Anwar had missed his own deadline, and dismissed his claim to have secured the defection of 30 MPs.

By 25 September, Anwar had still not amassed enough votes, creating doubts for Malaysians about whether he was really ready to take power, particularly in light of his failure to meet his own 16 September deadline for the transition of power. In the interim, UMNO had its own party meeting to broker Prime Minister Abdullah Ahmad Badawi's step down from power in June 2009, a year earlier than previously promised.

On 24 October 2008, Anwar admitted problems with his stalled bid to topple the UMNO's majority, saying that Pakatan Rakyat is running out of options to create a majority. His "credibility among ordinary Malaysians has been somewhat dented after Sept 16 and the new promise of forming the Government has not generated the sort of anticipation or excitement as before." Media within the country have taken an increasingly hostile view towards Anwar's protestations and failed threats to assemble a majority government.

=== 2013 general election ===
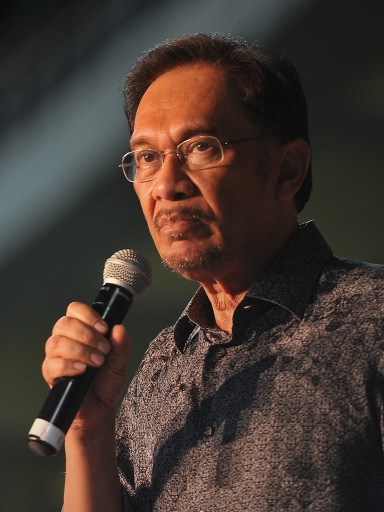
Anwar during GE13

In the 2013 general election (GE13), Anwar Ibrahim, as the Leader of the Opposition, led his Pakatan Rakyat coalition (comprising the three parties DAP, PAS, and PKR) to contest in the election. On 25 February 2013, Pakatan Rakyat launched their manifesto titled The People's Manifesto: Pakatan the hope of the people, pledging to reduce their financial burden, among other promises. Anwar, who has taught at Oxford and Georgetown University, said he would return to academic life if he lost the next election to incumbent prime minister Najib Razak.

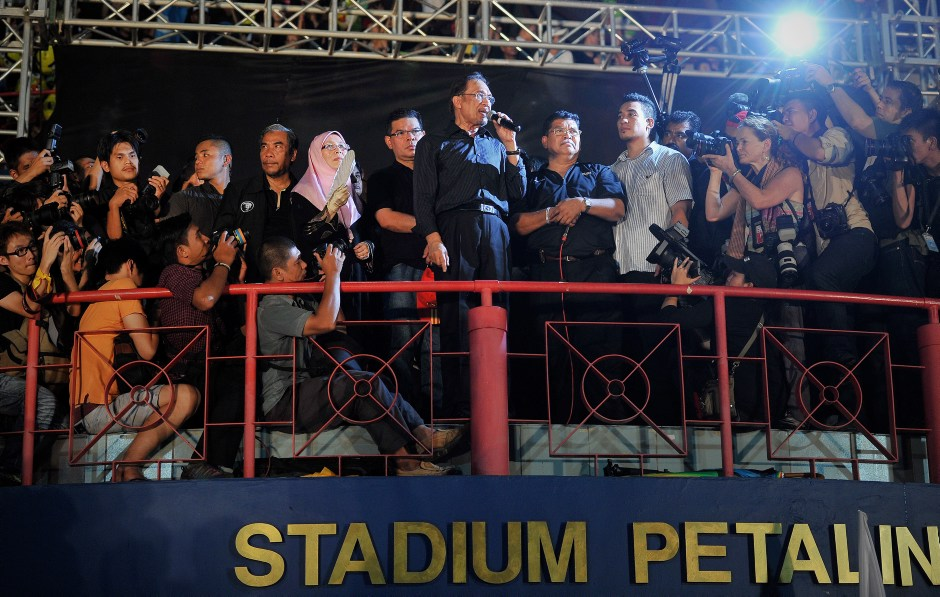
Anwar speaking at a rally denouncing the May 2013 election results.

Pakatan Rakyat did not achieve the regime change target in the election despite obtaining 50.9% of the popular vote compared to the 47.4% gained by Barisan Nasional. This was attributed to the heavy malapportionment of the electoral districts. Pakatan Rakyat also gained 7 more parliamentary seats compared to the 12th general election.

Anwar did not concede defeat, alleging widespread electoral fraud. Al Jazeera reported that Anwar Ibrahim came close to winning the election on 5 May 2013 but refused to admit defeat, and therefore also did not step down. In an interview for ABC News, interviewer Jim Middleton suggested that Anwar Ibrahim was going to be the Lee Kuan Yew of the Malaysian opposition. Anwar answered that he was not at that stage yet.

On 7 May 2013, Anwar Ibrahim vowed to lead a "fierce movement" to reform the country's electoral system and challenge the results of an election he lost. On 8 May 2013, about 120,000 people wearing black gathered at Petaling Jaya Stadium, Kelana Jaya, Selangor, to attend a rally organised by Anwar to protest against the election results and demand a free and fair election. The #Black505 movement continued for another 2 months with touring all over the country. A successful fundraising #Black505 dinner was held in Thean Hou Temple hall on 22 June 2013, hosted by Wangsa Maju MP Datuk Dr Tan Kee Kwong on behalf of PKR. Anwar Ibrahim immediately launched electoral petitions for over 30 disputed parliamentary seats in July 2013. However, the cases were thrown off election court for technical reasons. Anwar described the decision as a bad decision and disgraced the name of the country's judicial institution.

=== Kajang Move ===
On 27 January 2014, the member of the Selangor State Legislative Assembly for Kajang, Lee Chin Cheh, resigned. This triggered a by-election. A day later, Anwar Ibrahim was announced as Pakatan Rakyat candidate for the by-election. Anwar's candidacy was originally to propel him to become Selangor's Menteri Besar. Later, this move was known as the "Kajang Move".

This move, however, did not materialise as he was sentenced to five years' prison after Malaysia's Court of Appeal overturned his sodomy acquittal, causing Anwar to lose his qualification to be the state assembly candidate. On 9 March 2014, PKR announced party president Dr Wan Azizah Wan Ismail as its new candidate for the Kajang by-election. Anwar's Datuk Seri title was stripped by the Sultan of Selangor for "repeated questioning of the integrity" of the state's ruler during the subsequent crisis that saw the sultan refuse to appoint Wan Azizah as Menteri Besar. Anwar was able to continue using the "Datuk Seri" title because it had also been conferred on him by several other Malaysian states.

=== 2008–2014 sodomy trials ===
On 29 June 2008, online news portal Malaysiakini reported that a male aide of Anwar, Saiful Bukhari Azlan, had lodged a police report claiming that he had been sodomised by Anwar. Anwar said that the possibility of a prison sentence as a result of the allegations could be seen as an attempt to remove him from the leadership of the opposition following his growing support and by-election victories. He also reaffirmed his innocence and cited evidence in the form of medical reports. In July 2008, he was arrested over allegations of sodomy again, but was acquitted of the charge in January 2012 by The High Court. The presiding judge ruled that DNA evidence used in the case had been compromised and was unreliable. The prosecution filed an appeal against the acquittal.

On 7 March 2014, the Court of Appeal overturned the acquittal by unanimously deciding that the High Court failed to "critically evaluate" the evidence submitted by government chemist Dr Seah Lay Hong. The Court of Appeal rushed through a unanimous decision, signed by all three judges, and sentenced Anwar to five years imprisonment, disqualifying him from nomination in the Kajang by-election scheduled on 11 March. The conviction was viewed by some as a politically motivated attempt to prevent Anwar from contesting in the 2014 Kajang by-election, which he was expected to win and becoming Selangor's chief minister. Human Rights Watch and the International Commission of Jurists have accused the Malaysian government of meddling in this particular judicial matter and said the verdict was politically motivated. On 10 February 2015, the Federal Court of Malaysia upheld the decision of the Court of Appeal and affirmed the five-year prison sentence. He was sent immediately to Sungai Buloh Prison, Selangor, to serve the sentence.

== Pakatan Harapan backbencher (2018–2020) ==
=== Royal pardon and release ===
After the Pakatan Rakyat's dissolution during his imprisonment, a new opposition coalition named the Pakatan Harapan was formed with Anwar as the de facto leader in absentia. The coalition had come into power by overthrowing Barisan Nasional in the 2018 general election (GE14). Following the formation of the new ruling government, Anwar was given a full royal pardon and was released from prison on 16 May 2018. He was designated to take over the reins from interim prime minister Mahathir Mohamad as planned and agreed by the coalition before GE14. In an interview, he justified his reluctance to immediately step into power on the basis that Mahathir appeared committed to the reform agenda, and was doing a good job tackling a "disintegrating" political system. He also added that he was keen to travel and honour speaking engagements. Anwar also indicated that he initially had reservations about Mahathir's "reconciliation efforts", but he eventually forgave his former enemy after Mahathir showed "compassion and concern which (Anwar) thought was absent in the past".

=== Return to parliament ===
Anwar returned to Parliament through the Port Dickson by-election on 13 October 2018, after receiving a royal pardon for a sodomy conviction he maintained was politically motivated. He won the by-election with an increased majority, returning to Parliament for the first time in three years. The seat had been vacated by army veteran Danyal Balagopal Abdullah, a member of parliament for Anwar's PKR.

=== Sheraton Move and return to opposition ===
In late February 2020, the Pakatan Harapan government collapsed following defections by Anwar's deputy, Azmin Ali, and several MPs aligned to him, along with the withdrawal of BERSATU by Muhyiddin Yassin from the coalition. Mahathir promptly resigned from government, as well as from BERSATU. The political manoeuvring has been labelled the "Sheraton Move" for the hotel in Petaling Jaya at which defecting MPs gathered with the opposition to show support for a new government. Following the resignation of Mahathir, Anwar attempted to gather support for his appointment as prime minister. However, BERSATU president, Muhyiddin Yassin, was eventually appointed prime minister, with the support of a slender majority in the Dewan Rakyat. Thus, Pakatan Harapan returned to the opposition, with Anwar being named leader of the opposition.

== Second term as Leader of the Opposition (2020–2022) ==
While Muhyiddin formed a government under the auspices of a new coalition known as Perikatan Nasional, Mahathir attempted to regain his post with his Pakatan allies. However, under Anwar's leadership, KEADILAN refused to endorse Mahathir's bid for a third term as premier, claiming the nonagenarian had reneged on his repeated pledge to hand over the office to Anwar. Mahathir, in turn, refused to lend support to Anwar's candidacy, and nominated Sabah Chief Minister, Shafie Apdal, for the position of prime minister instead. Despite the support of allies DAP and Amanah for this compromise, KEADILAN again rejected the proposal and continued to propose Anwar as the coalition's candidate.

=== Collaboration with UMNO ===
In September 2020, Anwar attempted to form a new government, claiming that he had amassed a "formidable" majority, and submitted the number of 120 members of parliament to the then-Yang di-Pertuan Agong, Abdullah of Pahang. However, this move failed and Anwar, speaking at a party congress in July 2022, claimed that he had been forced to back down after refusing to provide assurances to Barisan Nasional and UMNO leaders that he would discontinue their court cases. Zahid had previously admitted to writing a statutory declaration alongside Najib supporting Anwar for the position as prime minister in October 2020.

In April 2021, a four-minute voice recording of a purported conversation between Anwar and Zahid shortly after an UMNO general assembly was leaked online, where the former praised the latter for their speech seeking a mandate from the party's membership to end its alliance with Perikatan Nasional. Despite both Anwar and Zahid's denial of the recording's veracity, Anwar argued it proved no wrongdoing. Zahid later admitted that it was his voice in the recording in July the same year.

=== 2022 general election ===
At a pre-election Pakatan Harapan convention, the coalition officially announced Anwar Ibrahim as the coalition's candidate for prime minister in the 2022 general election. Anwar announced he would be contesting the Tambun parliamentary seat in the 2022 general election and that if he became prime minister, he would form a smaller cabinet and reduce cabinet ministers' salaries. The decision to contest in Tambun, where an easy victory was not expected, was motivated by the fact its incumbent member of parliament at the time was former chief minister of Perak and BERSATU member Ahmad Faizal Azumu, who had followed his party into the opposing Perikatan Nasional coalition during the Sheraton Move. For this, he was labelled a "traitor" by the Pakatan Harapan coalition.

In the 2022 Malaysian general election held on 19 November 2022, Anwar's Pakatan Harapan coalition won a plurality of 82 seats out of 222, below the 112 seats needed for a majority. On 20 November, Anwar said that Pakatan Harapan had negotiated with other parties to form the federal government with a majority pending approval by the Yang di-Pertuan Agong, but Anwar refused to mention which other parties were cooperating with Pakatan Harapan. Also that day, Perikatan Nasional leader Muhyiddin Yassin claimed to have a sufficient majority to be appointed as prime minister, citing support from Perikatan Nasional, Barisan Nasional, Gabungan Parti Sarawak, and Gabungan Rakyat Sabah. On 21 November, Anwar was one of several Pakatan Harapan leaders that met with several Barisan Nasional leaders, including Ahmad Zahid Hamidi and Ismail Sabri Yaakob, at the Seri Pacific Hotel.

On 22 November, the royal palace stated that after the Yang di-Pertuan Agong reviewed the statutory declarations for prime minister, he found that "no member of parliament has the majority support to be appointed prime minister", so the Yang di-Pertuan Agong summoned Anwar and Muhyiddin to meet him. After the meeting, Muhyiddin said that the Yang di-Pertuan Agong proposed a unity government between Pakatan Harapan and Perikatan Nasional, but that Muhyiddin had rejected the idea as Perikatan Nasional "will not cooperate" with Pakatan Harapan; while Anwar acknowledged that the prime minister had yet to be determined, while stating "given time, I think we will secure a simple majority".

Anwar was sworn in as Malaysia's 10th Prime Minister on 24 November 2022, by the Yang di-Pertuan Agong, Al-Sultan Abdullah, after consulting with the Conference of Rulers of Malaysia. However, Muhyiddin continued to insist that he had the support of a majority of 115 MPs to form the next government and called on Anwar to prove his majority by revealing his statutory declarations. As of 24 November, Anwar had received support from MPs from PH, BN, GPS, Warisan, MUDA and PBM, as well as independent MPs. Anwar pledged to hold a vote of confidence on 19 December 2022, once MPs had been sworn into the Dewan Rakyat.

On 25 November, both Anwar and Gabungan Rakyat Sabah leader Hajiji Noor stated that the latter's coalition had joined the unity government supporting Anwar; giving him a two-thirds majority in parliament. Muhyiddin congratulated and acknowledged Anwar as prime minister, but declined the latter's invitation to join the unity government, stating that Perikatan would play the role of a "credible opposition" to ensure "corruption-free governance". Anwar also reiterated that he will not be taking any form of government salary during his tenure as prime minister and finance minister as a sign of his leadership and to gain the confidence of the people.

On 19 December, a motion of confidence for Anwar was passed by the Dewan Rakyat through a voice vote, further solidifying his legitimacy as prime minister.

== Premiership (2022–present) ==
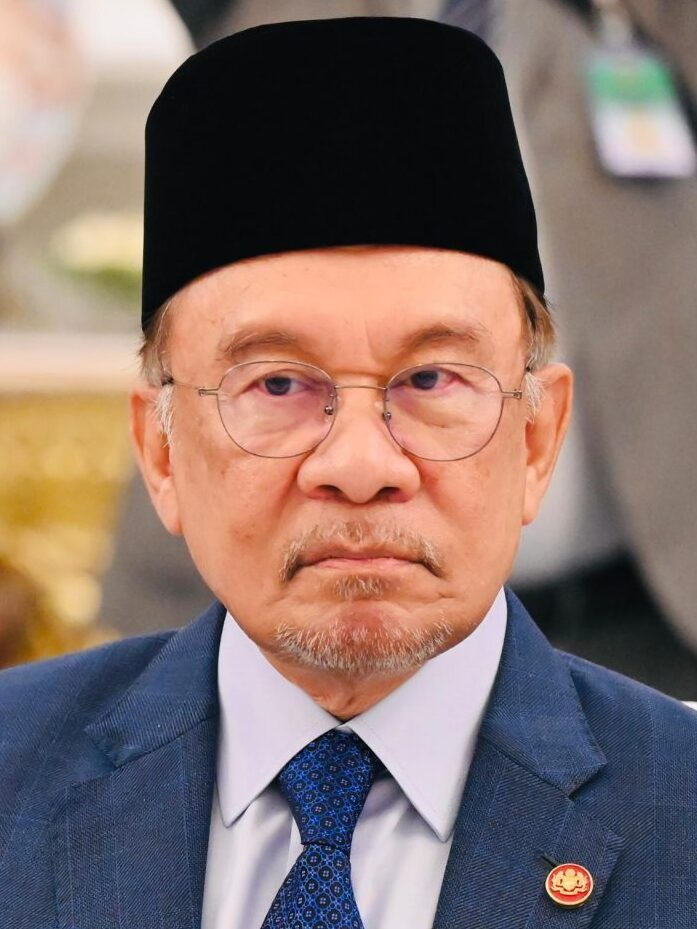
- Premiership of Anwar Ibrahim; 24 November 2022 – present
- Monarchs: Abdullah, Ibrahim Iskandar
- Vice President: Ahmad Zahid Hamidi and Fadillah Yusof
- Cabinet: Full list
- Party: PH–PKR
- Election: 2022
- Seat: Seri Perdana

=== Cabinet ===
Anwar announced his cabinet on 2 December 2022, appointing himself as the Minister of Finance. He also appointed President of UMNO Ahmad Zahid Hamidi and the Parliamentary Whip of Gabungan Parti Sarawak (GPS) Fadillah Yusof as the Deputy Prime Ministers. This marked the first time Malaysia had two deputy prime ministers in office concurrently.

Zahid's appointment was controversial due to his ongoing trials for money laundering, bribery and criminal breach of trust. It has been referred to as a "kleptocrat" cabinet as a result.

Criticism and allegations of nepotism were directed at Anwar following his decision to appoint Nurul Izzah Anwar as the chief economic and financial advisor to the prime minister on 3 January 2023. Despite reports indicating that Nurul Izzah was not getting paid for her position, she stepped down from her role as advisor in February 2023.

Anwar has publicly stated that he would be open to the inclusion of the Pan-Malaysian Islamic Party, a major component of the opposition Perikatan Nasional coalition, if they accepted his conditions; including ensuring every citizen regardless of religious identity a place in the country.

=== Domestic affairs ===
==== Anti-corruption and political reform ====
Anwar announced a number of political reforms to address corruption and graft as a priority for his government. However, his administration has been accused of backsliding on these intitiaves, including by major civil society organisations such as Bersih.

Since Anwar became prime minister, a number of corruption cases against UMNO members have been dropped. In September 2023, deputy prime minister Ahmad Zahid Hamidi was granted a discharge not amounting to acquittal from 47 corruption charges, eliciting public anger and led to the Malaysian United Democratic Alliance (MUDA) exiting government. Anwar has denied having any involvement in the court's decision, mentioning that then attorney-general Idrus Harun insisted on seeking a conditional discharge, and refused to discuss the issue in parliament. In February 2024, the 12-year prison sentence of Najib was halved by the pardons board, which did not give an explanation for its decision. In December 2025, Anwar's senior secretary Shamsul Iskandar Mohd Akin resigned, and was charged with receiving bribes the following week.

Critics have also accused Anwar of using the Malaysian Anti-Corruption Commission to persecute political opponents. Anwar has repeatedly rebuffed calls for the removal of the commission's chief investigator, Azam Baki, who has had his term extended thrice despite being the subject of public protests and allegations of misconduct. Following a Bloomberg News report alleging that Azam held more shares than allowed for civil servants, a special committee headed by the attorney-general has been formed to investigate the matter.

Anwar's government strengthened parliamentary autonomy through the Parliamentary Services Act 2025, which establishes an dedicated independent service for parliament. The act came into effect in October 2026,

In January 2026, Anwar announced that several reform bills will be introduced in the upcoming parliamentary sessions, including bills to limit the tenure of prime ministers to ten years, separation of prosecutorial role from the attorney-general, Ombudsman Act, and Freedom of Information Act. In March 2026, the constitutional amendment bill to impose a ten years term limit on the office of prime minister failed to acquire a supermajority support in parliament by two votes.

==== Education reform ====
In May 2026, Anwar announced and confirmed that graduates of Chinese private secondary schools and holders of the Unified Examination Certificate are allowed to enter certain courses in Malaysian public universities. This is on the condition that graduates must pass Malay and history in Malaysia's national secondary school examinations.

==== Economy ====
Since coming to power, Anwar, who is also the finance minister, has instituted a number of subsidy cuts and rationalisations with the aim of reducing government debt, which reached RM1.3 trillion by 'Q4 2025, or over 60% of gross domestic product. Blanket subsidies for diesel were ended for states located on Peninsular Malaysia, a measure expected to save the government RM4 billion annually. Targeted subsidies were retained for groups such as fishermen, and cash aid were allocated for farmers. Initial plans to remove petrol subsidies for the country's top 15% of earners, who accounted for 40% of the RM20 billion spent on subsisiding petrol, was shelved following public backlash. A new system that limited subsidised petrol to 300 litres per month per person was introduced in September 2025. Price controls and subsidies for chickens and eggs were also removed, electricity tariff restructured, and the sale of subsidised cooking oil to foreigners restricted.

The number of goods and services subjected to sales and service tax were expanded in July 2025 to include imported fruits, "luxury" and "premium items", as well as services such as private education and beauty services. Separately, excise duty on cigarettes were increased by 2 cents per stick, and 10% on alcohol.

The minimum wage was increased in two-stages from RM1,500 to RM1,700 in 2025.

Despite having previously expressed the need to move beyond race-based affirmative action, Anwar announced the allocation of RM1 billion to establish and grow a bumiputera entrepreneur class through government-linked and government-owned companies at the seventh Bumiputera Economic Congress convened by UMNO in March 2024, with Anwar to chair a secretariat formed to monitor the implementation of policies and resolutions approved at the congress.

Anwar's government developed an Urban Renewal Act, which would have introduced reforms to the sale of high-rise buildings and streamline development of dilapadated buildings. Analysts indicated some Malaysians feared it would disadvantage or displace Malay Muslims from urban areas.

==== Criminal justice ====
Anwar's government oversaw the passing of the Abolition of Mandatory Death Penalty Act 2023, allowing judges to choose between the death penalty and a 30 to 40 year prison sentence, with no less than 12 whippings, for 11 offences that previously mandated the death penalty. The act also abolished life imprisonment, replacing them with 30 to 40 year sentences. The act was applied retrospectively.

==== Social issues ====
Analysts and observers have noted Anwar's adoption of Malay nationalist and conservative Islamist positions as a means of garnering Malay-Muslim support, a constituency with whom his coalition has low support, and who represent a majority of the country. These include the notable banning of LGBTQ themed Swatch watches and their related materials, making their possession punishable by three years in jail, as well as the government's support for a bill empowering muftis to issue legally binding fatwas without parliamentary oversight.

Anwar has also expanded the role of Department of Islamic Development Malaysia (JAKIM) to include providing input on policy decisions following claims that his government had "abandoned Islam". However, he has refuted claims "excessive Islamisation", arguing that the move is intended to allow Muslims to gain a deeper knowledge of Islam to avoid inter-community conflict.

He also elicited public criticism for presiding over the conversion of a Malaysian Indian Hindu to Islam at a mosque.

Government institutions have been ordered not to entertain letters written in a language other than the national language, Malaysian Malay, as part of an effort to promote and empower its use.

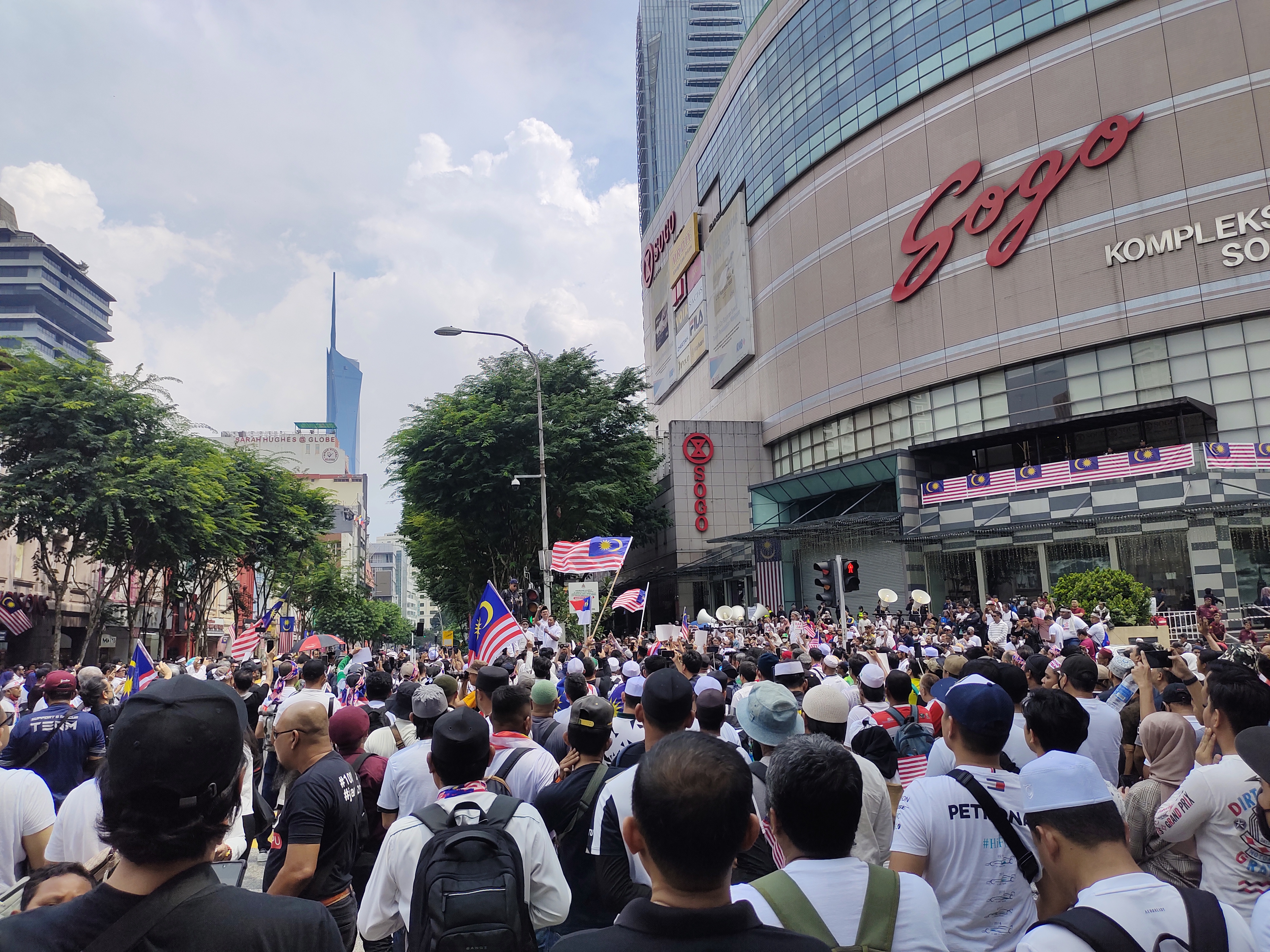
On 16 September 2023, participants in the rally expressed dissatisfaction with the government led by Anwar and protested against the acquitted charges of Ahmad Zahid Hamidi

=== International affairs ===
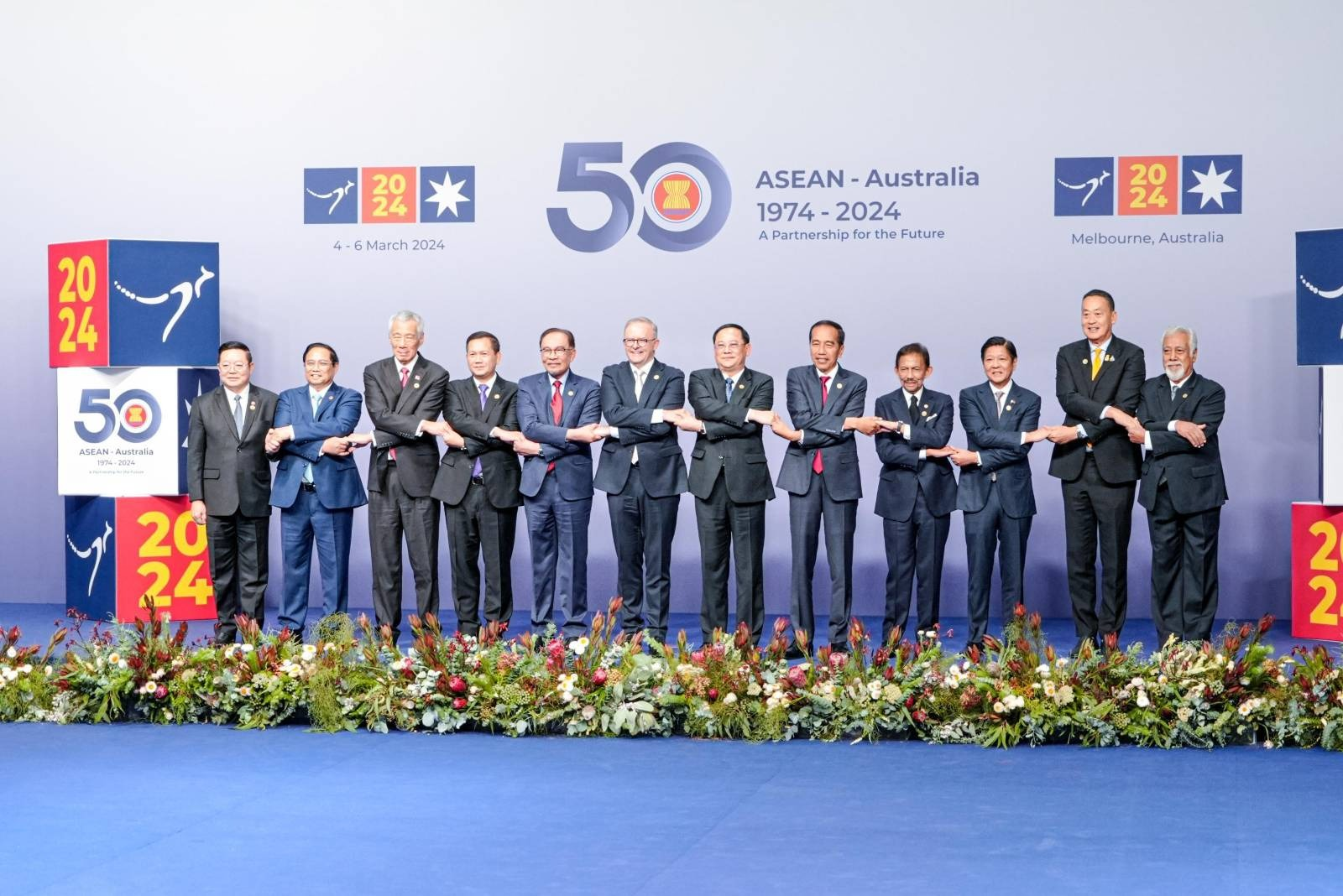
Anwar at the 2024 ASEAN–Australia Special Summit in Melbourne

In response to the 2023 Quran burnings in Sweden, Anwar announced that Malaysia would print one million copies of the Quran to be distributed worldwide.

The government has sought to be classified as a low-risk country for deforestation by the European Union, with Malaysia having previously lodged complaints against the European Union to the World Trade Organization following the passing of new legislation banning the import of material and goods produced on deforested land. Palm oil is a major Malaysian export and has been linked with deforestation in Malaysia.

In June 2024, Anwar announced that Malaysia would soon begin the process of joining BRICS, following a positive reception to its expression of interest. He later sought to ease concerns about Malaysia's potential membership in the BRICS intergovernmental organisation, emphasising that it would not impact domestic politics. Malaysia attained BRICS partner country status on 1 January 2025, with Rafizi Ramli representing Malaysia at the 16th BRICS Summit.

Anwar hosted negotiations in Kuala Lumpur between Thailand and Cambodia to end the 2025 Cambodia–Thailand border crisis on 28 July, where a ceasefire was achieved. The city later served as the location where a peace agreement was signed on 26 October 2025.

Anwar issued a condemnation of the U.S. military operation in Venezuela that led to the detention of President Nicolás Maduro and his wife. Anwar characterized the operation as a "clear violation of international law" and an "unlawful use of force against a sovereign state".

On 16 August 2026, Anwar gave an interview with Al Jazeera English, where he said "I see Taiwan as part of China, period" and that this was "accepted by all". Regarding the possibility of the use of force by China to achieve unification, Anwar said he would use force to "protect the sanctity and unity of" Malaysia if a Malaysian state was attempting to break away.

Anwar visited Russia twice and met with Vladimir Putin to discuss strengthening economic cooperation. In 2026, Anwar and Putin declared a deal where Malaysia would receive Russian fossil fuels in exchange for US dollars.

==== Gaza war and genocide ====
In October 2023, Anwar publicly condemned Israel in the Gaza war and urged for a ceasefire, calling for Palestinians to be "treated as human beings". His government's education ministry launched a nationwide Palestine Solidarity Week in support of Palestine and was criticised after students were seen with mock guns in schools. Despite two formal démarches by the U.S. Embassy for the Malaysian foreign ministry to designate Hamas a terrorist group, Anwar has publicly refused to do so, and has said his government would continue its relations with Hamas regardless of U.S. pressure.

On 20 December 2023, Anwar announced an immediate ban on ships bearing the Israeli flag from docking in Malaysia. Additionally, vessels destined for Israel will be prohibited from loading cargo at Malaysian ports.

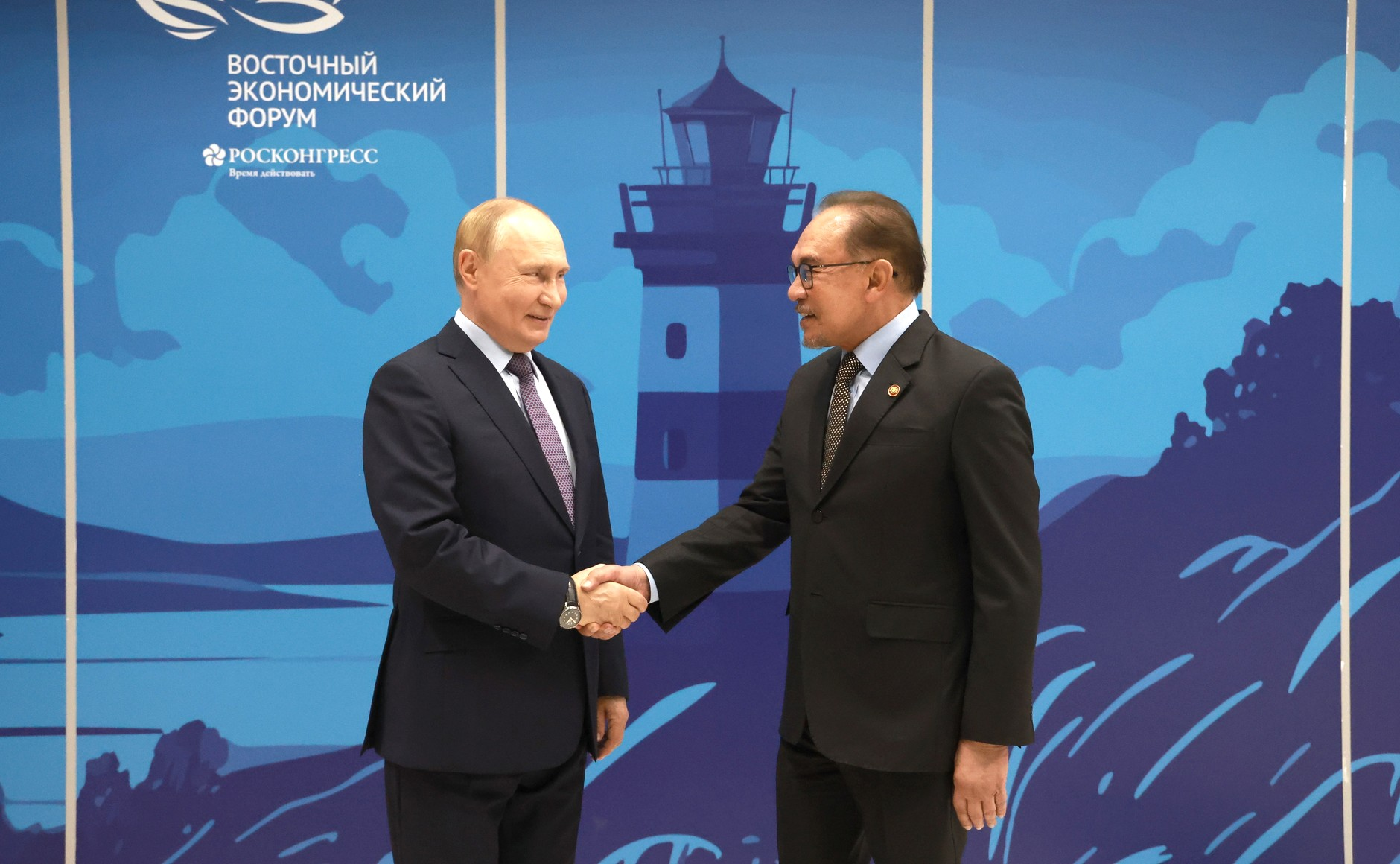
Anwar with Russian president Vladimir Putin at the Eastern Economic Forum in Primorsky Krai, Russia, 4 September 2024

In March 2024, on a trip to Germany, Anwar clarified that the Malaysian government only engages with Hamas' political wing and did not condone the killings of civilians. Anwar also called for the release of the hostages taken on 7 October by Hamas, but argued this alone would not be able to solve the conflict.

On 14 May 2024, Anwar met with top Hamas leaders in Qatar, a move met with some criticism. He condemned the killing of Yahya Sinwar by Israeli forces, referring to Israel as a "barbaric Zionist regime".

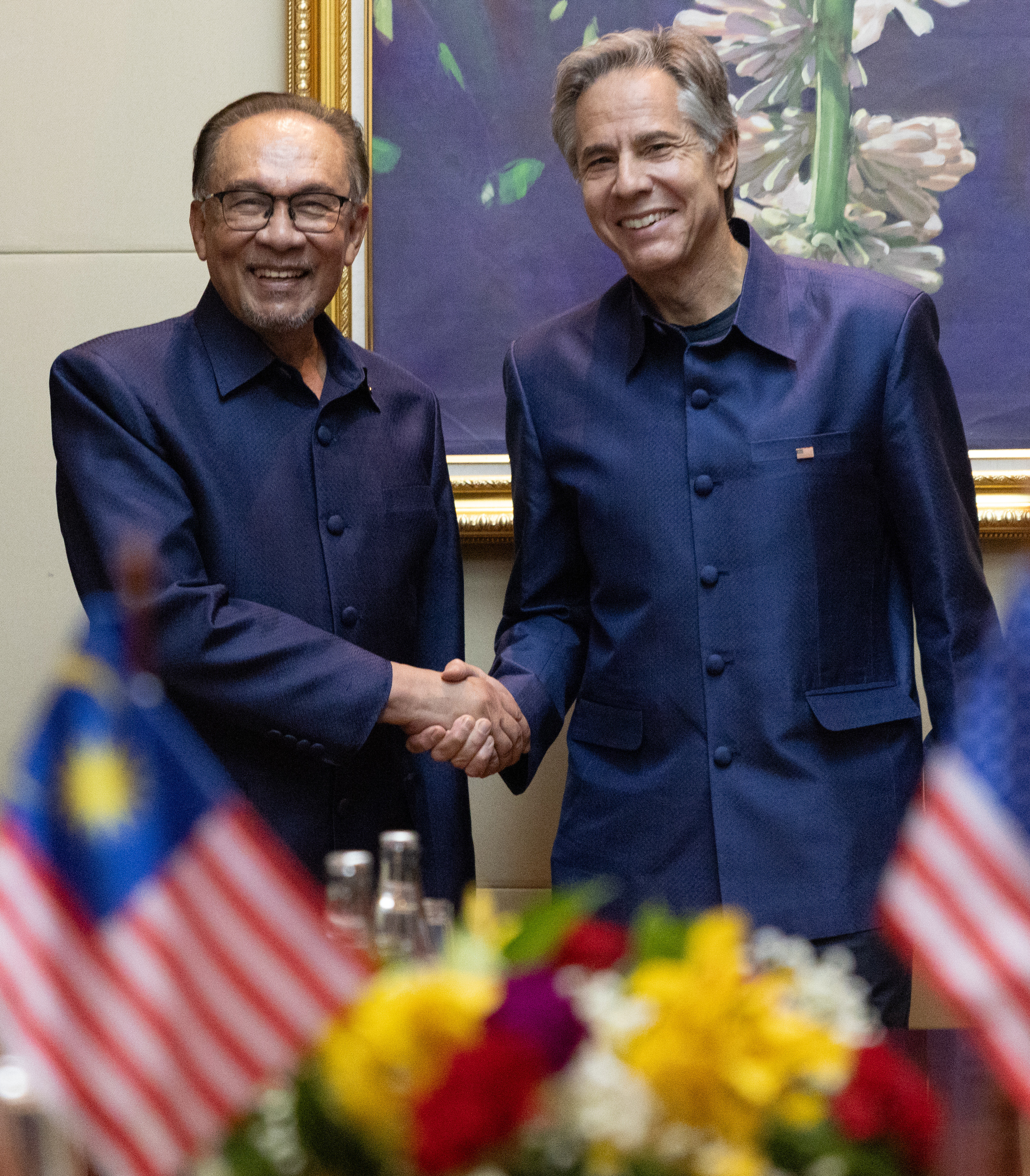
Anwar Ibrahim with U.S. secretary of state Antony Blinken in Vientiane, Laos, on 10 October 2024.

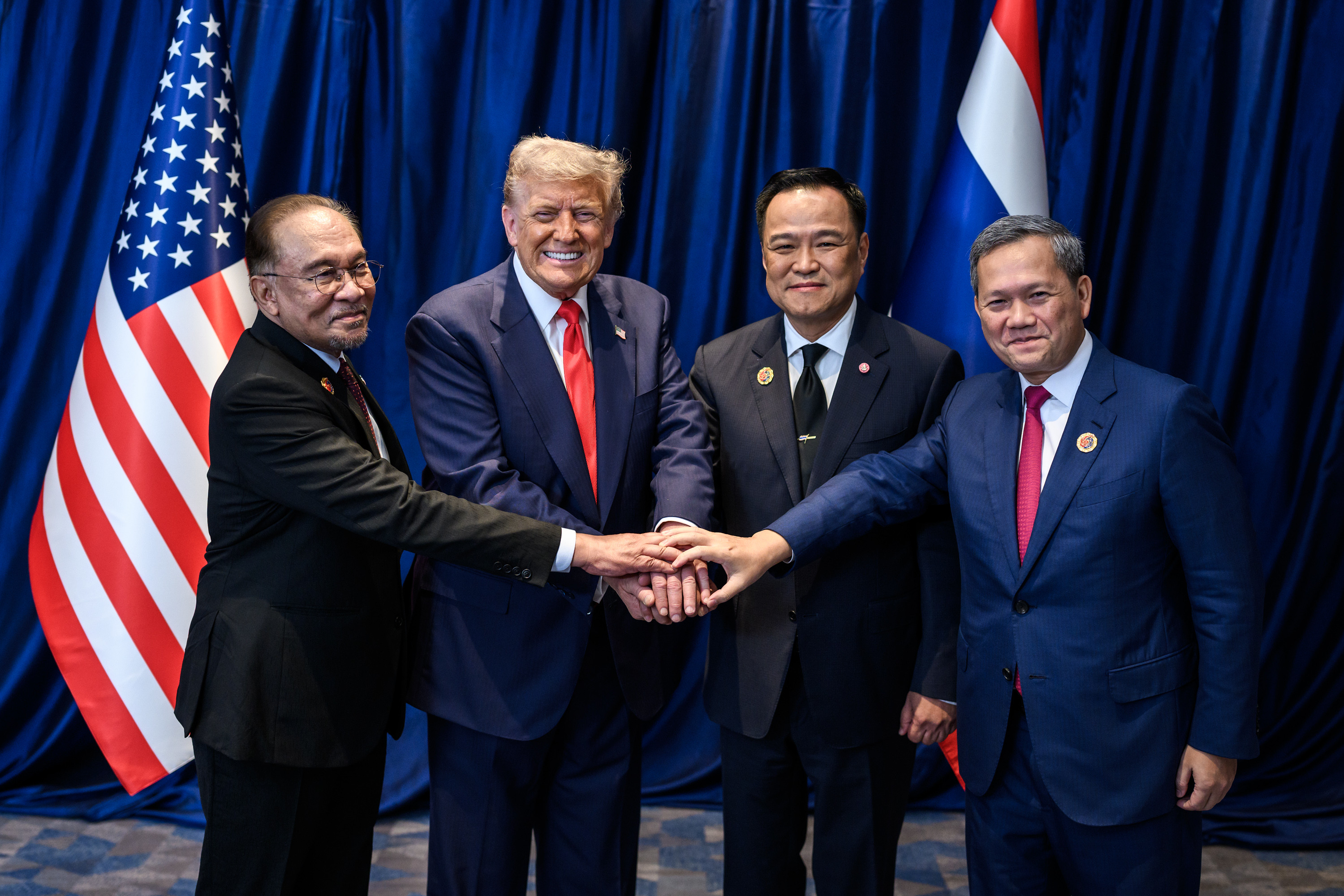
Anwar with U.S. president Donald Trump, Thai prime minister Anutin Charnvirakul and Cambodian prime minister Hun Manet after the signing of the Kuala Lumpur Peace Accords, 26 October 2025.

=== North Borneo dispute and the Malaysia-Sulu case ===
Litigation around the North Borneo dispute and the battle against the self-proclaimed heirs of the Sultan of Sulu has featured prominently in Anwar's premiership. His cabinet's response to the claims made by the purported Sulu descendants has been led by Azalina Othman Said, Minister for Law and Institutional Reforms in the prime minister's department.

He has also been vocal about his criticism of the claimants as well as the arbitration award announced by Spanish lawyer and arbitrator Gonzalo Stampa, describing the decision as a "sham and abusive". Stampa had ruled in favour of the Sulu claimants in France, and announced a settlement of US$14.9 billion payable by Malaysia, the largest arbitration award in history. This ruling was annulled by the French Court of Cassation in November 2024.

Also in November 2024, Philippine president Bongbong Marcos signed the Philippine Maritime Zones Act and the Philippine Archipelagic Sea Lanes Act. These laws reaffirmed the Philippines' maritime territories and rights to natural resources across the South China Sea, including Sabah, drawing strong criticism from Malaysia. On 15 November 2024, Kuala Lumpur lodged a diplomatic protest against the two maritime laws, arguing that they infringed upon Malaysia's territorial boundaries in the South China Sea.

=== Popularity ===
Public approval for Anwar has fallen since he first came to power, with a study conducted by Merdeka Center in October 2023 indicating that support had dropped from 68% to 50% among voters, while 60% believed the country was heading in the wrong direction. In 2023, The Economist opined that Anwar was wasting his opportunity in power.

In May 2025, a study by Merdeka Center showed an increase in approval for Anwar at 55% despite slower growth.

In July 2025, a protest was organised by the opposition calling for Anwar's resignation. According to Malaysiakini, it had an attendance of some 25,000 people.

In June 2026, a new study by Merdeka Center showed a light decrease in approval rating at 52%. He received the highest approval rating among key political leaders.

== Political positions and views ==
Anwar has advocated for Islamic democracy and has expressed hope that Malaysia be an example of democratic practices in the Muslim world. He has been described as a "liberal reformer, talented technocrat, genuine intellectual and perhaps even a man capable of bringing the spirit of the Arab Spring to one of Asia's largest majority Muslim nations." He has supported the Islamic concept of Ummah as a framework for democracy in Muslim countries, and called the three-world model "redundant" and "simplistic". Anwar has called for judicial independence, good governance and rejection of authoritarianism. During his time as a youth activist in his early career, he expressed his admiration for Philippine revolutionary José Rizal.

During his early political career in the 1960s, Anwar said that he supported affirmative action policies for Malays due to his concern about the dominance of Malaysian Chinese in businesses, but later changed his views. After leaving prison, he said that he considered "Malay supremacy" a "major problem". Referencing longstanding affirmative action policies for Malays and other bumiputera, in 2019 he called for transitioning to "affirmative-action policies [being] premised on need instead of race" and that those living in poverty can receive government support regardless of their race.

In 2018, The Guardian described him as a "uniting figure" for the opposition throughout his imprisonment and trials.

=== Israel and Palestine ===
In a press conference at the London School of Economics in March 2010, Anwar stated that Jews should not be condemned, but rather only the state ideology of Zionism and the aggression and injustice perpetrated against the Palestinians. He also believes that there are good and bad Jews, just as there are good and bad Muslims. In May 2010, B'nai B'rith International, a prominent Jewish human rights organisation, argued that Anwar has used his position in Malaysian parliament to spread antisemitic propaganda, such as his claim that Israeli spies are "directly involved in the running of the government". B'nai B'rith asked US officials to suspend their ties with Anwar.

In a 2012 interview with The Wall Street Journal, Anwar stated that he believes the policy towards Israel and Palestine should be clear – protecting the security of Israel while also being firm in protecting the legitimate interests of the Palestinians. Anwar later clarified his stance, saying that the remarks were consistent with the two-state solution adopted by the United Nations and Malaysia itself. In a 2024 interview with Mehdi Hasan for Zeteo, Anwar again expressed his support for the two-state solution.

Anwar has also condemned the United States' bias on the Israeli–Palestinian conflict, and called for Malaysia to recognise Jerusalem as the capital of Palestine. In October 2023, Anwar said that Malaysia would continue to maintain ties with Hamas, despite Western pressure to condemn Hamas following the October 7 attacks on Israel. He also condemned Israel's actions during the Gaza war as "barbaric" at a pro-Palestinian rally in Kuala Lumpur.

=== LGBTQ rights ===
Anwar has expressed changing views on LGBTQ rights throughout his political career. In a 2012 interview, he suggested that Malaysia's sodomy laws, under which he had been prosecuted, were "archaic" and could be amended. He clarified that while he believed in the sanctity of marriage between men and women and did not want to legalise homosexuality or same-sex marriage, he did not perceive it as "[his] business" to attack or arrest people based on their sexual orientation.

In 2018, Anwar urged religious people to counter the demand by "super liberals" to recognise the "LGBTQ lifestyle", saying that they did not have the right to "force" society to accept their views on LGBTQ rights. In 2022, he filed a defamation suit against Perak PAS Commissioner Razman Zakaria, who had claimed that Anwar would push the "LGBTQ agenda" and support communism. Anwar said that he had always denounced the "agenda" and advocated Islamic teachings and values.

As prime minister in 2023, Anwar asserted that LGBTQ rights, secularism, and communism would never be recognised under his government. In a 2023 CNN interview, he stated that while excessive harassment of the LGBTQ community would not be condoned, Malaysia would not officially recognise LGBTQ rights due to the consensus among the population. He also suggested that the sodomy laws should be reviewed to prevent abuse and political persecution.

== Personal life ==
Anwar is an ethnic Malay and a Muslim. He married Wan Azizah Wan Ismail on 26 February 1980. They have five daughters and a son. His eldest daughter, Nurul Izzah Anwar, is the former MP for Permatang Pauh.

During his trials and time in prison in the 2000s, Anwar spent time in solitary confinement, and experienced frequent beatings which required him to undertake surgery in Germany upon his release. He once appeared in court with a black eye. Anwar has professed an interest in the works of William Shakespeare, and said that he read a copy of his complete works four and a half times during his imprisonment. He presented a paper to the World Shakespeare Congress in 2006. In prison, he also said he survived by singing songs and reading.

== Cultural depictions ==
=== Biographies and popular media ===
Anwar early rise in politics have been depicted by Indonesian-Malaysian production film, Anwar: The Untold Story in 2023.

== Election results ==
Parliament of Malaysia
Year	Constituency	Candidate	Votes	Pct	Opponent(s)	Votes	Pct	Ballots cast	Majority	Turnout
1982	P041 Permatang Pauh	Anwar Ibrahim (UMNO)	18,849	74.88%	Zabidi Ali (PAS)	4,497	17.90%	25,885	14,352	79.95%
1982	P041 Permatang Pauh	Anwar Ibrahim (UMNO)	18,849	74.88%	Tan Ah Huat (DAP)	1,825	7.25%	25,885	14,352	79.95%
1986	P041 Permatang Pauh	Anwar Ibrahim (UMNO)	17,979	70.56%	Mohamad Sabu (PAS)	7,500	29.44%	26,098	10,479	74.82%
1990	P041 Permatang Pauh	Anwar Ibrahim (UMNO)	23,793	75.69%	Mahfuz Omar (PAS)	7,643	24.31%	31,740	16,150	78.32%
1995	P044 Permatang Pauh	Anwar Ibrahim (UMNO)	27,945	76.08%	Abdul Rahman Manap (DAP)	4,715	12.84%	37,618	23,230	78.79%
1995	P044 Permatang Pauh	Anwar Ibrahim (UMNO)	27,945	76.08%	Mazani Abdullah (PAS)	4,071	11.08%	37,618	23,230	78.79%
2008	P044 Permatang Pauh	Anwar Ibrahim (PKR)	31,195	66.64%	Arif Shah Omar Shah (UMNO)	15,524	33.16%	47,258	15,671	80.84%
2008	P044 Permatang Pauh	Anwar Ibrahim (PKR)	31,195	66.64%	Hanafi Mamat (AKIM)	92	0.20%	47,258	15,671	80.84%
2013	P044 Permatang Pauh	Anwar Ibrahim (PKR)	37,090	58.56%	Mazlan Ismail (UMNO)	25,369	40.06%	63,332	11,721	88.33%
2013	P044 Permatang Pauh	Anwar Ibrahim (PKR)	37,090	58.56%	Abdullah Zawawi Samsudin (IND)	201	0.32%	63,332	11,721	88.33%
2018	P132 Port Dickson	Anwar Ibrahim (PKR)	31,016	71.32%	Mohd Nazari Mokhtar (PAS)	7,456	17.14%	44,136	23,560	58.60%
2018	P132 Port Dickson	Anwar Ibrahim (PKR)	31,016	71.32%	Mohd Isa Abdul Samad (IND)	4,230	9.73%	44,136	23,560	58.60%
2018	P132 Port Dickson	Anwar Ibrahim (PKR)	31,016	71.32%	Stevie Chan Keng Leong (IND)	337	0.78%	44,136	23,560	58.60%
2018	P132 Port Dickson	Anwar Ibrahim (PKR)	31,016	71.32%	Lau Seck Yan (IND)	214	0.49%	44,136	23,560	58.60%
2018	P132 Port Dickson	Anwar Ibrahim (PKR)	31,016	71.32%	Kan Chee Yuen (IND)	154	0.35%	44,136	23,560	58.60%
2018	P132 Port Dickson	Anwar Ibrahim (PKR)	31,016	71.32%	Saiful Bukhari Azlan (IND)	82	0.19%	44,136	23,560	58.60%
2022	P063 Tambun	Anwar Ibrahim (PKR)	49,625	39.77%	Ahmad Faizal Azumu (BERSATU)	45,889	36.78%	126,444	3,736	77.71%
2022	P063 Tambun	Anwar Ibrahim (PKR)	49,625	39.77%	Aminuddin Md Hanafiah (UMNO)	28,140	22.55%	126,444	3,736	77.71%
2022	P063 Tambun	Anwar Ibrahim (PKR)	49,625	39.77%	Abdul Rahim Tahir (PEJUANG)	1,115	0.89%	126,444	3,736	77.71%

== Honours and awards ==
=== Honours of Malaysia ===
- Malaysia
  - Recipient of the 10th Yang di-Pertuan Agong Installation Medal (1994)
  - Recipient of the 16th Yang di-Pertuan Agong Installation Medal (2019)
  - Recipient of the 17th Yang di-Pertuan Agong Installation Medal (2024)
- Kedah
  - Knight Grand Companion of the Order of Loyalty to Sultan Sallehuddin of Kedah (SSSK) – Dato' Seri Diraja (2024)
  - Recipient of the sultan Sallehuddin Installation Medal (2018)
- Kelantan
  - Knight Grand Commander of the Order of the Crown of Kelantan (SPMK) – Dato' (2024)
- Malacca
  - Grand Commander of the Exalted Order of Malacca (DGSM) – Datuk Seri (1991)
- Negeri Sembilan
  - Knight Grand Commander of the Order of Loyalty to Negeri Sembilan (SPNS) – Dato' Seri Utama (1994)
- Pahang
  - Knight Grand Companion of the Order of Sultan Ahmad Shah of Pahang (SSAP) – Dato' Sri (1990)
- Penang
  - Knight Grand Commander of the Order of the Defender of State (DUPN) – Dato' Seri Utama (1994)
  - Companion of the Order of the Defender of State (DMPN) – Dato' (1991)
- Perak
  - Knight Grand Commander of the Order of Cura Si Manja Kini (SPCM) – Dato' Seri (1995)
- Perlis
  - Knight Grand Companion of the Order of the Gallant Prince Syed Putra Jamalullail (SSPJ) – Dato' Seri Diraja (1995)
  - Recipient of Tuanku Syed Sirajuddin Jamalullail Silver Jubilee Medal (2025)
- Sabah
  - Grand Commander of the Order of Kinabalu (SPDK) – Datuk Seri Panglima (1994)
- Selangor
  - Knight Grand Companion of the Order of Sultan Salahuddin Abdul Aziz Shah (SSSA) – Dato' Seri (1992, revoked on 3 November 2014)

=== Foreign honours ===
- Brunei
  - Recipient of the Family Order of Laila Utama (DK I) – Dato Laila Utama (2026)
- Kosovo
  - Recipient of the Order of Independence (2025)
- Pakistan
  - Grand Cross with Collar of the Order of Pakistan (NPk) (2024)
- Peru
  - Grand Cross of the Order of the Sun of Peru (2024)
- Philippines
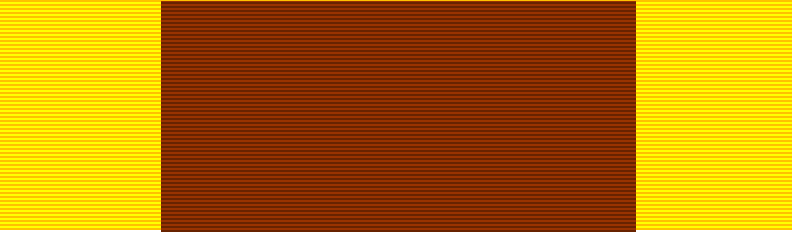
  - Knight Grand Cross of the Order of the Knights of Rizal (KGCR) (1997)
- Timor-Leste
  - Grand Collar of the Order of Timor-Leste (2025)
- Turkiye
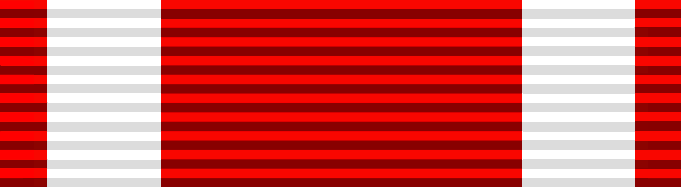
  - Recipient of the Order of the Republic (2026)

=== Honorary degrees ===
- China
  - Honorary Ph.D. degree from Tsinghua University (2024)
- Indonesia
  - Honorary Ph.D. degree in Political Education from State University of Padang (2018)
- Pakistan
  - Honorary Ph.D. degree in Philosophy from National University of Sciences & Technology (2024)
- Philippines
  - Honorary Ph.D. degree in law from University of the Philippines Diliman (2023)
- Russia
  - Honorary Ph.D. degree from Moscow State Institute of International Relations (2025)
- United States
  - Honorary Ph.D. degree in law from Shenandoah University (2025)

=== Others ===
- China
  - Honorary Professorship from Tsinghua University (2024)

== Published works ==
=== Books ===
- Menangani Perubahan (Managing Changes), 1989.
- Gelombang Kebangkitan Asia (The Asian Renaissance), 1996.
- Membangun Negara Madani (For A Better Malaysia), 2022.
- Keadilan Bagi Orang Yang Bersolat (Justice For People Who Pray), 2022.
- Rethinking Ourselves: Justice, Reform and Ignorance in Post-Normal Times, 2025

=== Prefaces ===
- Malek Bennabi, Islam in History and Society, 1991.
- Ziauddin Sardar, The Future of Muslim Civilization, 2006.

== See also ==
- Reformasi (Malaysia)
- Caucus on Reform and Governance
- List of current heads of state and government
- List of heads of the executive by approval rating
- Members of the Malaysian Parliament who represented multiple states

== Bibliography ==
- Alias Muhammad, PAS' Platform: Development and Change, 1951–1986, Gateway Publishing House, 1994, ISBN 967-75-0023-6
- Charles Allers, The Evolution of a Muslim Democrat: The Life of Malaysia's Anwar Ibrahim, Peter Lang, 2013, ISBN 978-1-4331-2356-6
- Moktar Petah, Kerajaan mansuh kekebalan Raja Melayu, ART Media, 1993, ISBN 983-9835-00-9

Parliament of Malaysia
Preceded by Zabidi Ali	Member of the Dewan Rakyat for Permatang Pauh; 1982–1999	Succeeded by Wan Azizah Wan Ismail
Preceded by Wan Azizah Wan Ismail	Member of the Dewan Rakyat for Permatang Pauh; 2008–2015	Succeeded by Wan Azizah Wan Ismail
Preceded by Danyal Balagopal Abdullah	Member of the Dewan Rakyat for Port Dickson; 2018–2022	Succeeded by Aminuddin Harun
Preceded by Ahmad Faizal Azumu	Member of the Dewan Rakyat for Tambun; 2022–present	Incumbent
Party political offices
Preceded by Shuhaimi Kamarudin	Youth Chief of the United Malays National Organisation; 1982–1987	Succeeded by Najib Razak
Preceded by Abdul Ghafar Baba	Deputy President of the United Malays National Organisation; 1993–1998	Vacant Title next held by Abdullah Ahmad Badawi
Preceded by Wan Azizah Wan Ismail	Leader of Pakatan Rakyat; 2008–2015	Position abolished
Preceded by Wan Azizah Wan Ismail	President of the People's Justice Party; 2018–present	Incumbent
Preceded by Mahathir Mohamad	Chairman of Pakatan Harapan; 2020–present	Incumbent
Political offices
Preceded by Kamaruddin Mohamed Isa	Deputy Minister in the Prime Minister's Department; 30 April 1982 - 2 June 1983	Succeeded by Mohd Radzi Sheikh Ahmad
Preceded by Mokhtar Hashim	Minister of Culture, Youth and Sports; 1983–1984	Succeeded by Sulaiman Daud
Preceded by Manan Osman	Minister of Agriculture; 1984–1986	Succeeded by Sanusi Junid
Preceded by Abdullah Ahmad Badawi	Minister of Education; 1986–1991	Succeeded by Sulaiman Daud
Preceded by Daim Zainuddin	Minister of Finance; 1991–1998	Succeeded by Mahathir Mohamad
Preceded by Abdul Ghafar Baba	Deputy Prime Minister of Malaysia; 1993–1998	Vacant Title next held by Abdullah Ahmad Badawi
Preceded by Wan Azizah Wan Ismail	Leader of the Opposition; 2008–2015	Succeeded by Wan Azizah Wan Ismail
New office	Chairman of the Caucus on Reform and Governance; 2018–2020	Position abolished
Preceded by Ismail Sabri Yaakob	Leader of the Opposition; 2020–2022	Succeeded by Hamzah Zainudin
Preceded by Ismail Sabri Yaakob	Prime Minister of Malaysia; 2022–present	Incumbent
Preceded by Tengku Zafrul Aziz	Minister of Finance; 2022–present	Incumbent
Diplomatic posts
Preceded by Sonexay Siphandone	Chairperson of the ASEAN; 2025	Succeeded by Bongbong Marcos
Academic offices
Preceded by Hussein Onn	President of International Islamic University Malaysia; 1988–1998	Succeeded by Najib Razak
Other offices
Preceded by Hamidah Khamis	Spouse of the Deputy Prime Minister of Malaysia; 2018–2020	Vacant Title next held by Muhaini Zainal Abidin
