= 2023 Malaysian state elections =

Sub-national general elections

2023 Malaysian state election
- 12 August 2023

6 out of 13 state legislatures (DUN) 245 out of 600 seats
- Legend: Pakatan Harapan hold Perikatan Nasional hold No election/Federal Territories

State elections in 2023 were held in Selangor, Kelantan, Terengganu, Negeri Sembilan, Kedah and Penang on 12 August 2023, following the dissolution of their state assemblies between 22 June and 1 July 2023.

The state elections were held concurrently with the 2023 Kuala Terengganu by-election.

== Background ==
The results of the 2022 general election, visualised with the borders of state constituencies. Gray areas represent constituencies with election petitions filed.

State elections in Malaysia were traditionally held alongside general elections. However, states can independently dissolve their own assemblies. Therefore, during the previous general election in 2022, only three states, Perlis, Perak and Pahang dissolved their state assemblies and held their state elections concurrently, while another four states, Sabah, Malacca, Sarawak and Johor held their state elections earlier before the 2022 general election, due to the ongoing political crisis at that time, leaving only the remaining six states which have chosen not to dissolve their assemblies at the time of the general election.

== Participating parties ==
The elections are the first to be held under the unity government led by Pakatan Harapan (PH) chairman and prime minister Anwar Ibrahim. All main component parties of PH, PKR, DAP and AMANAH, as well as the opposition coalition, Perikatan Nasional (PN), are participating in the elections. Barisan Nasional (BN), the second largest coalition in the unity government, saw only UMNO members taking part, with the other two main component parties, MCA and MIC sat out the elections. Among the parties in the unity government not participating in the state elections include the Sabah-based WARISAN and PBM.

Similar decisions were taken by several smaller parties such as Pejuang and Putra, which decided not to participate. Their leaders, together with some Perikatan Nasional leaders, previously agreed informally not to contest against each other.

Despite being part of the unity government, MUDA announced its decision to contest against unity government coalitions in the elections, after its president Syed Saddiq Syed Abdul Rahman claimed that the party was sidelined by PH. Following this, MUDA and the Socialist Party of Malaysia (PSM) signed an electoral pact after the latter announced candidates to contest in the state elections too. Another party without any elected representatives in Parliament taking part in the state elections is PRM contesting 15 seats in Penang and Selangor.

== Composition ==
Number of seats
State	Overall Total	PH + BN	±	PN	±	Muda	±	Others	±	Vacant Seats	±
Previous Election Result (by each state respectively)
Kedah	36	16		20		n/a					
Kelantan	45	8		37		n/a					
Terengganu	32	10		22		n/a					
Penang	40	37		3		n/a					
Selangor	56	49		7		n/a					
Negeri Sembilan	36	36		0		n/a					
Total	245	156		89		n/a					
Upon dissolution
Kedah	36	12	4	20	Steady	0	Steady	2	2	2	2
Kelantan	45	7	1	37	Steady	0	Steady	0	Steady	1	1
Terengganu	32	10	Steady	22	Steady	0	Steady	0	Steady	0	Steady
Penang	40	35	2	1	2	0	Steady	0	Steady	4	4
Selangor	56	45	4	5	2	0	Steady	3 + 2	5	1	1
Negeri Sembilan	36	36	Steady	0	Steady	0	Steady	0	Steady	0	Steady
Total	245	145	11	85	4	0	Steady	7	7	8	8
Election Result
Kedah	36	3	9	33	13	0	Steady	0	2	0	2
Kelantan	45	2	5	43	7	0	Steady	0	Steady	0	1
Terengganu	32	0	10	32	10	0	Steady	0	Steady	0	Steady
Penang	40	29	6	11	10	0	Steady	0	Steady	0	4
Selangor	56	34	11	22	17	0	Steady	0	5	0	1
Negeri Sembilan	36	31	5	5	5	0	Steady	0	Steady	0	Steady
Total	245	99	46	146	61	0	Steady	0	7	0	8

== Important Dates ==
State Legislature	Term Began	Term End	Dissolution Date (Note: 3rd or 4th week of June 2023)	Nomination Day	Early Voting Days	Election Day	Refs
Selangor	26 June 2018	26 June 2023	23 June 2023	29 July 2023	8–11 August 2023	12 August 2023	
Kelantan	28 June 2018	28 June 2023	22 June 2023	29 July 2023	8–11 August 2023	12 August 2023	
Terengganu	1 July 2018	1 July 2023	28 June 2023	29 July 2023	8–11 August 2023	12 August 2023	
Negeri Sembilan	2 July 2018	2 July 2023	1 July 2023	29 July 2023	8–11 August 2023	12 August 2023	
Kedah	4 July 2018	4 July 2023	28 June 2023	29 July 2023	8–11 August 2023	12 August 2023	
Penang	2 August 2018	2 August 2023	28 June 2023	29 July 2023	8–11 August 2023	12 August 2023	

== Selangor ==
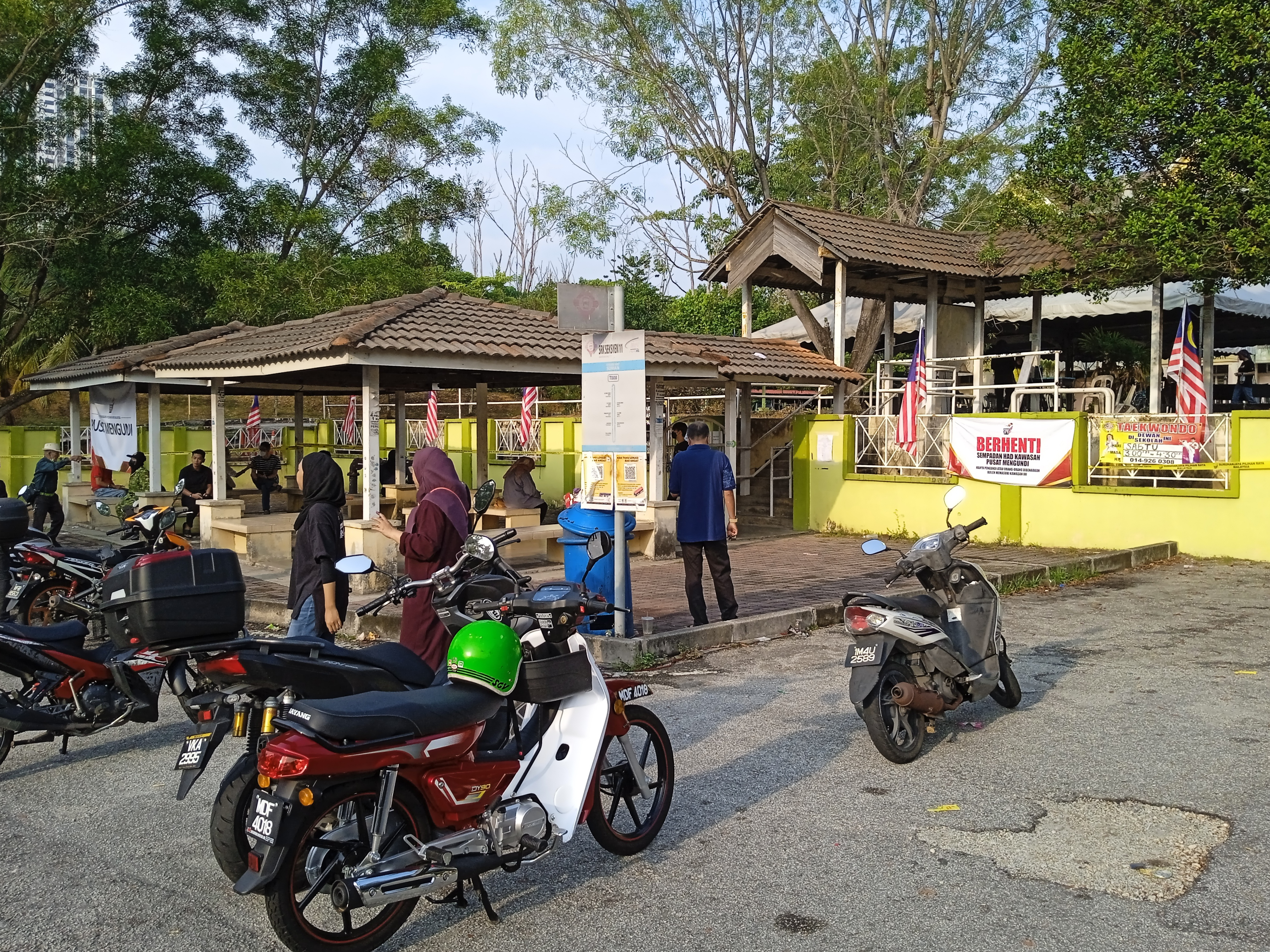
Polling day of 2023 Selangor state election

Pakatan Harapan won the Selangor state election after they reached 34 of 56 seats to form state government while Perikatan Nasional won 22 seats. On 21 August 2023, incumbent Amirudin Shari sworn in as Selangor Menteri Besar for the second term.

Earlier, Pakatan Harapan (previously Barisan Alternatif, Pakatan Rakyat) maintained their stronghold in Selangor after they took over control of the state government from Barisan Nasional in the 2008 election and continued to do so for three consecutive terms in 2008, 2013, and 2018. The unity government, now represented by Pakatan Harapan and Barisan Nasional, faced Perikatan Nasional which consists of Bersatu, PAS and Gerakan in the election.

== Kelantan ==
Perikatan Nasional (PN) won the Kelantan state election for the eighth time after they reached 43 of 45 seats to form state government. Meanwhile, BN and PH won one seat each. On 15 August 2023, Mohd Nassuruddin Daud, Meranti Assemblyman, appointed as a new Kelantan Menteri Besar, replaced Ahmad Yakob.

Earlier, PAS, which is now part of the Perikatan Nasional coalition, ruled Kelantan from Barisan Nasional since the 1990 election and held seven consecutive terms in 1990, 1995, 1999, 2004, 2008, 2013, 2018.

== Terengganu ==
Perikatan Nasional (PN) won the Terengganu state election for the second time after they won all 32 seats to form the state government. On 15 August 2023, incumbent Ahmad Samsuri Mokhtar retained as Terengganu Menteri Besar for a second term.

Earlier, PAS, which is under Perikatan Nasional, ruled the Terengganu state government from Barisan Nasional since the 2018 election.

== Negeri Sembilan ==
The unity government (PH + BN) won the Negeri Sembilan state election after they won 31 of 36 seats to form state government, while PN won 5 seats. On 14 August 2023, incumbent Aminuddin Harun retained his position as Negeri Sembilan Menteri Besar for the second term.

Earlier, Pakatan Harapan ruled the Negeri Sembilan state government since the 2018 election. Now, the unity government, which represents Pakatan Harapan and Barisan Nasional, will face Perikatan Nasional which consists of Bersatu and PAS in next state election.

== Kedah ==
Perikatan Nasional (PN) has won Kedah state election after won 33 of 36 seats to form state government while unity government (PH + BN) has won 3 seats. On 14 August 2023, incumbent Sanusi Mohd Nor sworn in as Kedah Menteri Besar for second term.

Earlier, PAS which is under Perikatan Nasional has ruled the Kedah state government after took over from Pakatan Harapan due to political crisis in 2020.

== Penang ==
Pakatan Harapan (PH) won the Penang state election for the fourth time with cooperation from BN after they reached 29 of 40 seats to form the state government, while PN won 11 seats. On 13 August, incumbent Chow Kon Yeow sworn in as Penang Chief Minister for a second term.

Earlier, Pakatan Harapan (previously Barisan Alternatif, Pakatan Rakyat) remained a stronghold in Penang after it took over state government from Barisan Nasional in the 2008 election, holding three consecutive terms in 2008, 2013, 2018. It would be challenged by former governing party of Penang, Gerakan, which now joins Perikatan Nasional together with Bersatu and PAS.

== Opinion polls ==
=== 2023 ===
Polling firm	Dates conducted	Region	Sample size	PH+BN	PN	MUDA+PSM	Oth	Lead	Ref
Ilham Centre	29 July – 8 August 2023	Kedah	2,304	24%	69%	–	7%	PN +45%	
Ilham Centre	29 July – 8 August 2023	Kelantan	2,304	13%	65%	–	22%	PN +43%	
Ilham Centre	29 July – 8 August 2023	Terengganu	2,304	21%	63%	–	14%	PN +42%	
Ilham Centre	29 July – 8 August 2023	Penang	2,304	64%	36%	–	0%	PH+BN +28%	
Ilham Centre	29 July – 8 August 2023	Selangor	2,304	55%	23%	–	22%	PH+BN +32%	
Ilham Centre	29 July – 8 August 2023	Negeri Sembilan	2,304	57%	24%	–	19%	PH+BN +33%	
Merdeka Center	26 July – 11 August 2023	Selangor	2,966	49%	36%	–	15%	PH+BN +13%	
Endeavour-MGC	12–18 June 2023	Selangor	1,068	53%	37%	1%	9%	PH+BN +7%	
Merdeka Center	3–14 July 2023	Negeri Sembilan	1,005	59%	18%	–	22%	PH+BN +37%	
