= Subsidy reforms in Malaysia =

Subsidy reforms in Malaysia were first initiated in 2010 by Prime Minister Najib Razak via a reduction in subsidies for fuel and sugar to counter the rising cost of living in the country. Further cuts in subsidies for these and other products were planned over a three to five year period to strengthen government finances and improve economic efficiency. These reforms were scaled back in 2014, but were reintroduced by the Pakatan Harapan government after 2018. Anwar Ibrahim's government introduced further reforms during his premiership from 2022.

== Implementation ==
Prime Minister Najib announced cuts in the subsidies for vehicle fuel, sugar, and gas for cooking that took effect on midnight 15 July 2010.

RON95 and RON97 grades of petrol was subject to a price increase of RM0.05 per litre resulting in prices of RM1.85 and 2.10 per litre respectively. The price of liquefied petroleum gas, commonly known as LPG, was raised by RM0.10 to RM1.90 per kilogram. The price of diesel was fixed at RM1.75 per litre. Sugar increased in price by RM0.25 to RM1.85 per kilogram. Prices for cooking gas have increased by RM0.10 per kilogram. For example, a 10 kg cylinder of cooking gas will increase from RM17.50 to RM18.50.

At the start of 2014, the government withdrew subsidies of RON97, a premium grade of petrol. The prime minister stressed that the government would continue to standardise prices in Sabah and Sarawak to protect the rural poor.

On 1 December 2014, the government of Malaysia briefly ended the subsidy of all fuels, taking advantage of low oil prices at the time, potentially saving the government almost RM20 billion ringgit (US$5.97 billion) annually. A managed float mechanism was put in place where prices would adjust according to the market rate. Subsidies for fuels was re-introduced in 2018.

== Budget implications ==
Prime Minister Najib cited improving the government's balance sheet as a key reason for subsidy reform. The Malaysian government spent RM24.5 billion on subsidies in 2009, contributing to a large deficit amounting to 7% of GDP. Subsidy rationalisation will save about RM750 million in 2010. The government projects that it will still spend RM7.82 billion on fuel and sugar subsidies the same year. Najib expressed hope that reforms would inspire the confidence of financial markets. Moody's Investors Service said that Malaysia's subsidy cuts were partially responsible for maintaining its standing in financial markets and that there is "upward pressure" on its bond rating.

The prime minister emphasised that not all of the savings would go to deficit reduction. He said to reporters, "We use the savings from expenditure to fulfil more agenda such as the National Key Results Area (NKRA) and National Key Economic Areas which we are implementing." Scholarships for excellent students and healthcare efforts such as the 1Malaysia Clinics were specifically mentioned. Najib said that these changes would only minimally impact family budgets while bringing long-term benefits to the nation.

== Smuggling and shortages ==
Malaysia's extensive system of subsidies has been linked to shortages and smuggling of commodities. Malaysian fisherman often abandon fishing to sell fuel intended for their boats to their counterparts in countries like Thailand and Indonesia that do not offer similar subsidies. According to Domestic Trade, Cooperatives and Consumerism Minister Ismail Sabri Yaakob businesses eligible for subsidised sugar often dramatically over-order and illegally sell their surplus to industries that are not targeted for subsidy. Such schemes can sometimes make it difficult for consumers to locate and purchase commodities.

== Anwar Ibrahim era ==
After the 2022 Malaysian general election which saw the establishment of a unity government led by Pakatan Harapan (PH), Prime Minister Anwar Ibrahim announced a review of government subsidies, aiming to direct funds towards lower-income groups. During the 2026 Strait of Hormuz crisis, the cost for the government to maintain these subsidies reached RM3.2 billion a month.
